= Rural Councils of Turkmenistan =

A geňeşlik, which roughly translates to "council," is a form of third-level administrative division of Turkmenistan. Councils are representative assemblies made up of elected members. In Turkmenistan, a council, "geňeş", is the local self-governing institution of all kind of administrative subdivision, while a "geňeşlik" is a specific term used for rural third-level administrative divisions.

In opposition to cities and towns, which are urban third-level administrative divisions, villages are grouped in rural councils which are usually less populated while their economy is theorically exclusively focused on agriculture. Rural councils are included within districts.

== History ==
The establishment of rural councils was enacted by law on 14 December 1992. The law "on establishing the status of administrative-territorial entities in Turkmenistan" modified the terminology of the administrative divisions, translating Russian terms into Turkmen. "Oblasts" were renamed "Welaýat," "Raions" were renamed "Etrap," etc. Rural councils' territories were established upon the former Soviet farms: Kolkhoz, Sovkhoz and Mezhkhoz. They are since then called "Geňeşlik" instead.

== Legal bases ==
The legal bases of councils are stated in the 4th section of the Constitution of Turkmenistan, from article 115 to article 118. Rural councils are no exception to regular councils.

== Duties ==
The duties of a rural council, as stated in the constitution, are the as follows. Councils shall:

1. determine the basic areas of economic, social and cultural development;
2. draw up and approve the budget and report on its performance;
3. set local taxes and fees, and their treatment;
4. manage property, which they own;
5. define measures for rational use of natural resources and environmental protection;
6. contribute to maintaining public order;
7. deal with other issues assigned by law to their competence.

== Representation ==
Although being appointed by the Assembly of Turkmenistan, as stated in the article 81, representative bodies are elected by citizens using universal suffrage. Rural councils are headed by an "arçyn", literally "elder," who is elected by the members themselves. The arçyn acts as the executive power, enforcing decisions of its respective representative body and those from higher administrative structures such as districts, provinces, or state.

== List ==
Here is a list of the 458 rural councils designated as such by law in Turkmenistan as of September 8, 2025. The following list sorts councils by their administrative division, then by alphabetical order.

Name	Population (2022)	Seat	Nb. of villages	District	Province
Bereket	10,597	Bereket	1	Ak bugdaý	Ahal
Bereketli	3,785	Bükri	8	Ak bugdaý	Ahal
Bugdaýly	3,827	Bugdaýly	3	Ak bugdaý	Ahal
Burunojar	2,178	Mekan	1	Ak bugdaý	Ahal
Gämi	18,716	Gämi	2	Ak bugdaý	Ahal
Garagum	1,492	Garagum	1	Ak bugdaý	Ahal
Magtymguly	9,173	Magtymguly	1	Ak bugdaý	Ahal
Öňaldy	5,770	Döwletli mekan	11	Ak bugdaý	Ahal
Parahat	4,594	Parahat	1	Ak bugdaý	Ahal
Sähra	4,510	Sähra	9	Ak bugdaý	Ahal
Täzedurmuş	8,101	Täzedurmuş	7	Ak bugdaý	Ahal
Ýaşyldepe	6,563	Ýaşyldepe	1	Ak bugdaý	Ahal
Balykçylyk	363	Balykçy	1	Altyn asyr	Ahal
Çäçe	5,067	Çäçe	1	Altyn asyr	Ahal
Döwletli	8,354	Döwletli	2	Altyn asyr	Ahal
Gurban Durdy	3,185	Gurban Durdy	3	Altyn asyr	Ahal
Mäne	4,877	Mäne	1	Altyn asyr	Ahal
Waharman	2,658	Waharman	2	Altyn asyr	Ahal
Ak altyn	8,936	Ak altyn	1	Babadaýhan	Ahal
Akwekil	17,908	Akwekil	2	Babadaýhan	Ahal
Garawekil	17,574	Garawekil	2	Babadaýhan	Ahal
Hasyl	6,886	Hasyl	1	Babadaýhan	Ahal
Täzeýol	10,415	Täzeýol	2	Babadaýhan	Ahal
Ýarygökje	9,897	Ýarygökje	1	Babadaýhan	Ahal
Zähmet	12,256	Zähmet	3	Babadaýhan	Ahal
Akdepe	9,244	Akdepe	2	Bäherden	Ahal
Bamy	8,542	Bamy	2	Bäherden	Ahal
Börme	5,612	Börme	2	Bäherden	Ahal
Döwgala	4,482	Döwgala	1	Bäherden	Ahal
Durun	10,967	Durun	1	Bäherden	Ahal
Garagan	5,788	Garagan	1	Bäherden	Ahal
Garawul	9,299	Garawul	2	Bäherden	Ahal
Kirpili	2,313	Kirpili	4	Bäherden	Ahal
Mürçe	5,211	Mürçe	3	Bäherden	Ahal
Nohur	6,258	Nohur	1	Bäherden	Ahal
Saýwan	2,305	Saýwan	2	Bäherden	Ahal
Sünçe	1,919	Sünçe	2	Bäherden	Ahal
Ýarajy	8,634	Ýarajy	2	Bäherden	Ahal
Ahal	17,093	Ahal	9	Gökdepe	Ahal
Akgoňur	5,375	Akgoňur	1	Gökdepe	Ahal
Babaarap	9,681	Babaarap	1	Gökdepe	Ahal
Derweze	5,084	Derweze	3	Gökdepe	Ahal
Hurmantgökje	9,302	Hurmantgökje	1	Gökdepe	Ahal
Keleje	7,260	Keleje	1	Gökdepe	Ahal
Köpetdag	7,302	Köpetdagyň ýalkymy	4	Gökdepe	Ahal
Owadandepe	7,636	Nurly zaman	8	Gökdepe	Ahal
S.A. Nyýazow	9,022	S.A. Nyýazow	4	Gökdepe	Ahal
Şorgala	4,432	Şorgala	1	Gökdepe	Ahal
Tagan Baýramdurdyýew	9,150	Gökdepe	1	Gökdepe	Ahal
Täze eýýam	5,196	Täze eýýam	1	Gökdepe	Ahal
Türkmenistan	7,796	Türkmenistan	3	Gökdepe	Ahal
Ýaňgala	9,980	Ýaňgala	3	Gökdepe	Ahal
Arapgala	4,125	Arapgala	1	Kaka	Ahal
Artyk	2,466	Artyk	1	Kaka	Ahal
Garahan	1,832	Garahan	1	Kaka	Ahal
Gowşut	8,703	Bagtly zamana	3	Kaka	Ahal
Gozgan	2,749	Gozgan	1	Kaka	Ahal
Harçiňňan	1,412	Harçiňňan	1	Kaka	Ahal
Kürengala	2,441	Kürengala	2	Kaka	Ahal
Mehinli	5,680	Mehinli	9	Kaka	Ahal
Alam	2,169	Alam	1	Sarahs	Ahal
Aşgabat	4,470	Aşgabat	1	Sarahs	Ahal
Ata	3,701	Ata	1	Sarahs	Ahal
Bagtyýarlyk	3,257	Gökhan	3	Sarahs	Ahal
Galkynyş	7,579	Galkynyş	5	Sarahs	Ahal
Hanýap	2,282	Hanýap	1	Sarahs	Ahal
Kiçiaga	13,363	Agzybirlik	4	Sarahs	Ahal
Parahatçylyk	5,432	Parahatçylyk	3	Sarahs	Ahal
Ýalawaç	3,541	Ýalawaç	1	Sarahs	Ahal
Adalat	1,807	Adalat	5	Tejen	Ahal
Agalaň	9,023	Ezizhan	1	Tejen	Ahal
Babadaýhan	8,070	Babadaýhan	1	Tejen	Ahal
Berdi Kerbabaýew	4,576	Berdi Kerbabaýew	1	Tejen	Ahal
Birleşik	8,092	Birleşik	1	Tejen	Ahal
Bitaraplyk	8 245	Bitaraplyk	2	Tejen	Ahal
Garaşsyzlyk	9,072	Garaşsyzlyk	3	Tejen	Ahal
Garryçyrla	7,405	Garryçyrla	1	Tejen	Ahal
Göniamaşa	7,046	Göniamaşa	1	Tejen	Ahal
Täzeoba	8,614	Täzeoba	1	Tejen	Ahal
Zaman	3,457	Zaman	3	Tejen	Ahal
Oboý	4,231	Oboý	6	Bereket	Balkan
S.A. Nyýazow	3,559	Uzynsuw	4	Bereket	Balkan
Ýasga	3,677	Ýasga	7	Bereket	Balkan
Ajyýap	4,042	Ajyýap	1	Esenguly	Balkan
Bugdaýly	7,172	Bugdaýly	7	Esenguly	Balkan
Çaloýyk	1,989	Çaloýyk	1	Esenguly	Balkan
Çekişler	2,401	Çekişler	2	Esenguly	Balkan
Garadegiş	1,840	Garadegiş	1	Esenguly	Balkan
Akýaýla	2,056	Akýaýla	3	Etrek	Balkan
Garaagaç	615	Garaagaç	1	Etrek	Balkan
Gyzylbaýyr	3,516	Gyzylbaýyr	1	Etrek	Balkan
Madaw	5,052	Madaw	1	Etrek	Balkan
Arkaç	7,663	Rowaç	7	Gyzylarbat	Balkan
Azady	2,090	Azady	5	Gyzylarbat	Balkan
Goç	2,969	Goç	5	Gyzylarbat	Balkan
Hasar	2,364	Çukur	3	Gyzylarbat	Balkan
Hojagala	1,917	Hojagala	1	Gyzylarbat	Balkan
Paraw	1,416	Paraw	2	Gyzylarbat	Balkan
Purnuwar	1,652	Purnuwar	1	Gyzylarbat	Balkan
Çendir	3,271	Ak	3	Magtymguly	Balkan
Daghojagala	1,369	Hojagala	2	Magtymguly	Balkan
Daýna	1,161	Daýna	1	Magtymguly	Balkan
Gerkez	2,316	Ýuwangala	5	Magtymguly	Balkan
Könekesir	3,388	Könekesir	2	Magtymguly	Balkan
Kürüždeý	3,684	Kürüždeý	5	Magtymguly	Balkan
Ýankel	3,716	Ýankel	4	Magtymguly	Balkan
Akguýy	2,261	Akguýy	7	Türkmenbaşy	Balkan
Çagyl	1,219	Çagyl	3	Türkmenbaşy	Balkan
Goýmat	1,058	Goýmat	3	Türkmenbaşy	Balkan
Agöýli	7,773	Allaýaroý	4	Akdepe	Daşoguz
Ak bugdaý	2,807	Magtymoý	1	Akdepe	Daşoguz
Akdepe	5,057	Zähmet	4	Akdepe	Daşoguz
Atçapan	4,959	Gyzylýap	3	Akdepe	Daşoguz
Döwletmämmet Azady	5,745	Alilioý	2	Akdepe	Daşoguz
Gorkut	5,269	Derekli	1	Akdepe	Daşoguz
Magtymguly Garlyýew	14,102	Arap	6	Akdepe	Daşoguz
Mollanepes	13,856	Watan	10	Akdepe	Daşoguz
Nowruz	14,381	Sekizatlyk	5	Akdepe	Daşoguz
Pagtaçylyk	7,944	Medet	7	Akdepe	Daşoguz
Sähra	3,949	Saýat	4	Akdepe	Daşoguz
Sazakly	7,456	Ketgenli	5	Akdepe	Daşoguz
Täzeoba	2,619	Türkmenistan	3	Akdepe	Daşoguz
10 ýyl abadanlyk	5,179	Agzybirlik	5	Boldumsaz	Daşoguz
Almalyk	17,967	Bereketli	9	Boldumsaz	Daşoguz
Aşgabat	8,155	Çigoý	6	Boldumsaz	Daşoguz
Garaşsyzlyk	6,770	Asudalyk	6	Boldumsaz	Daşoguz
Guwanç Atamedow	10,937	Göbeklioý	4	Boldumsaz	Daşoguz
Guýanagyz	4,223	Akmanýap	2	Boldumsaz	Daşoguz
Medeniýet	6,748	Altyn toprak	5	Boldumsaz	Daşoguz
Rowaçlyk	6,333	Galdaw	4	Boldumsaz	Daşoguz
Zähmetkeş	6,610	Altyn asyr	4	Boldumsaz	Daşoguz
Agzybirlik	13,743	Rejepguly Ataýew	6	Garaşsyzlyk	Daşoguz
Altyn toprak	23,120	Keneges	5	Garaşsyzlyk	Daşoguz
Ak altyn	22,584	Täzeýol	7	Garaşsyzlyk	Daşoguz
Gyzyltakyr	6,609	Basuwly	3	Garaşsyzlyk	Daşoguz
Nurmuhammet Andalyp	18,583	Andalyp	5	Garaşsyzlyk	Daşoguz
Şabat	23,244	Magtym	6	Garaşsyzlyk	Daşoguz
Sapyş Çerkezow	10,199	Magaryf	3	Garaşsyzlyk	Daşoguz
Sazanda	3,840	Sazanda	4	Garaşsyzlyk	Daşoguz
Täzezaman	16,181	Bagly	6	Garaşsyzlyk	Daşoguz
Üçkepderi	1,905	Dostluk	4	Garaşsyzlyk	Daşoguz
Aksaraý	13,723	Aksaraý	7	Görogly	Daşoguz
Annagylyç Ataýew	9,953	Annagylyç Ataýew	5	Görogly	Daşoguz
Balyş Öwezow	9,353	Çoşşy Arazgylyjow	5	Görogly	Daşoguz
Bedirkent	11,338	Ýaňyýap	3	Görogly	Daşoguz
Bereket	15,528	Ýagtylyk	7	Görogly	Daşoguz
Durdy Gylyç	5,687	Ikinji Diregli	5	Görogly	Daşoguz
Garagum	862	Garaýanyk	3	Görogly	Daşoguz
Hüdük Myradow	14,724	Bedirkent	6	Görogly	Daşoguz
Magtymguly	18,048	Agöý	9	Görogly	Daşoguz
Türkmenistan	7,453	Kerpiçli	3	Görogly	Daşoguz
Türkmenýoly	6 809	Garaýyk	4	Görogly	Daşoguz
Ýagtylyk	11,718	Boýunbaş	6	Görogly	Daşoguz
Ýenbekçi	2,334	Ýenbekçi	6	Görogly	Daşoguz
Zaman	10,594	Akdepe	4	Görogly	Daşoguz
Abadanlyk	14,968	Abadanlyk	5	Gubadag	Daşoguz
Akýaýla	7,209	Ýelharaz	3	Gubadag	Daşoguz
Amyderýa	18,143	Öküzýap	8	Gubadag	Daşoguz
Babadaýhan	4,322	Wahym	3	Gubadag	Daşoguz
Baýdak	11,995	Çüýrükgala	5	Gubadag	Daşoguz
Bereketli	17,967	Täzegala	6	Gubadag	Daşoguz
Bitarap Türkmenistan	10,566	Igdirli	6	Gubadag	Daşoguz
Çowdur	6,527	Tommakýap	3	Gubadag	Daşoguz
Gökýaýla	6,197	Ak altyn	3	Gubadag	Daşoguz
Gubadag	8,743	Beglerýap	5	Gubadag	Daşoguz
Jeýhun	7,362	Pagtaçy	5	Gubadag	Daşoguz
Ýaşlyk	8,796	Gulabiýa	4	Gubadag	Daşoguz
Akderýa	8,512	Akderýa	6	Köneürgenç	Daşoguz
Akgala	22,216	Akgala	8	Köneürgenç	Daşoguz
Akýol	4,760	Zaman	5	Köneürgenç	Daşoguz
Derýalyk	11,015	Derýalyk	5	Köneürgenç	Daşoguz
Ezberköl	3,761	Ezberköl	2	Köneürgenç	Daşoguz
Galkynyş	6,883	Galkynyş	4	Köneürgenç	Daşoguz
Hakykat	5,069	Hakykat	4	Köneürgenç	Daşoguz
Kyrkgyz	5,715	Kyrkgyz	4	Köneürgenç	Daşoguz
Maslahat	12,641	Maslahat	5	Köneürgenç	Daşoguz
Pagtaçy	7,306	Pagtaçy	6	Köneürgenç	Daşoguz
Täzegüýç	9,019	Täzegüýç	6	Köneürgenç	Daşoguz
Täzeýap	6,557	Täzeýap	3	Köneürgenç	Daşoguz
Watan	5,319	Watan	6	Köneürgenç	Daşoguz
Aşyk Aýdyň	2,935	Aşyk Aýdyň	7	Ruhubelent	Daşoguz
Diýarbekir	1,023	Diýarbekir	2	Ruhubelent	Daşoguz
Geňeş	3,190	Geňeş	6	Ruhubelent	Daşoguz
Ruhnama	1,371	Ruhnama	2	Ruhubelent	Daşoguz
Şabende	3,274	Şabende	6	Ruhubelent	Daşoguz
Şagadam	3,930	Türkmenistan	8	Ruhubelent	Daşoguz
Tünüderýa	2,715	Tünüderýa	6	Ruhubelent	Daşoguz
Egriguýy	1,307	Egriguýy	1	Ruhubelent	Daşoguz
Zähmet	6,774	Toprakgala	4	Ruhubelent	Daşoguz
Adalat	7,584	Garaporsaň	3	Şabat	Daşoguz
Altynýol	6,056	Dilewar	3	Şabat	Daşoguz
Alyşir Nowaýy	13,969	Hemzeşyh	6	Şabat	Daşoguz
Asudalyk	9,952	Maýlyjeňňel	3	Şabat	Daşoguz
Berkarar	1,841	Guljangala	1	Şabat	Daşoguz
Biruni	4,861	Mehinli	2	Şabat	Daşoguz
Bossan	12,656	Helleň	5	Şabat	Daşoguz
Diýar	18,897	Abdalýap	4	Şabat	Daşoguz
Gaýrat	9,464	Ýaňyýol	4	Şabat	Daşoguz
Gülüstan	20,341	Parahat	4	Şabat	Daşoguz
Hasylçy	13,857	Hasylçy	7	Şabat	Daşoguz
Nowbahar	28,205	Rozumboý	6	Şabat	Daşoguz
Şatlyk	17,871	Täzebazar	6	Şabat	Daşoguz
Şöhrat	7,968	Buýanly	3	Şabat	Daşoguz
Aýböwür	2,655	Aýböwür	5	Saparmyrat Türkmenbaşy	Daşoguz
Alýan	5,865	Alýan	6	Saparmyrat Türkmenbaşy	Daşoguz
Baýram Taganow	1,647	Toklulyoý	2	Saparmyrat Türkmenbaşy	Daşoguz
Bitaraplyk	2,614	Bitaraplyk	6	Saparmyrat Türkmenbaşy	Daşoguz
Bugdaýly	4,051	Täzeýer	3	Saparmyrat Türkmenbaşy	Daşoguz
Dostluk	7,318	Nazarbaýdegiş	5	Saparmyrat Türkmenbaşy	Daşoguz
Döwkesen	2,002	Döwkesen	5	Saparmyrat Türkmenbaşy	Daşoguz
Döwletli	3,963	Döwletli	3	Saparmyrat Türkmenbaşy	Daşoguz
Gallaçy	3,398	Gallaçy	2	Saparmyrat Türkmenbaşy	Daşoguz
Görelde	4,701	Sowranly	3	Saparmyrat Türkmenbaşy	Daşoguz
Goşahowly	11,311	Arzuw	10	Saparmyrat Türkmenbaşy	Daşoguz
Güneşli Türkmenistan	6,713	Gazakdegiş	5	Saparmyrat Türkmenbaşy	Daşoguz
Gyzyljagala	9,719	Kirşenoý	7	Saparmyrat Türkmenbaşy	Daşoguz
Kemine	3,325	Seýitýaýla	3	Saparmyrat Türkmenbaşy	Daşoguz
Mollaoraz Hojamämmedow	4,131	Guýulyk	3	Saparmyrat Türkmenbaşy	Daşoguz
Nazly Gylyjow	7,370	Gyzylçaryk	5	Saparmyrat Türkmenbaşy	Daşoguz
Parahat	5,218	Gölýer	3	Saparmyrat Türkmenbaşy	Daşoguz
Ruhabat	2,320	Bozoba	3	Saparmyrat Türkmenbaşy	Daşoguz
Şamahy	5,395	Şamahy	5	Saparmyrat Türkmenbaşy	Daşoguz
Saparmät Hojaýew	1,094	Ýartygala	2	Saparmyrat Türkmenbaşy	Daşoguz
Sarygamyş	8,195	Sarygamyş	4	Saparmyrat Türkmenbaşy	Daşoguz
Serdar	3,325	Serdar	3	Saparmyrat Türkmenbaşy	Daşoguz
Täzedurmuş	3,690	Üçtam	2	Saparmyrat Türkmenbaşy	Daşoguz
Ýalkym	8,009	Toraňňyly	7	Saparmyrat Türkmenbaşy	Daşoguz
Ýeňiş	3,642	Nefereoý	3	Saparmyrat Türkmenbaşy	Daşoguz
Amyderýa	10,546	Zähmetkeş	7	Çärjew	Lebap
Balta Myradow	13,871	Açyl Mürzäýew	7	Çärjew	Lebap
Bereket	11,651	Ýasydepe	7	Çärjew	Lebap
Boýrabap	13,971	Boýrabap	8	Çärjew	Lebap
Hojaili	18,542	Bekaryk	12	Çärjew	Lebap
Kölaryk	13,965	Kölaryk	9	Çärjew	Lebap
Nobat Gutlyýew	16,849	Nobat Gutlyýew	11	Çärjew	Lebap
Sarykbala	10,452	Sarykbala	8	Çärjew	Lebap
Zergär	12,267	Gyzylýap	9	Çärjew	Lebap
Aşgabat	5,772	Aşgabat	3	Dänew	Lebap
Azatlyk	4,063	Azatlyk	2	Dänew	Lebap
Baragyz	3,247	Baragyz	4	Dänew	Lebap
Berzeň	9,018	Berzeň	6	Dänew	Lebap
Boýnyuzyn	11,847	Kaksaçan	6	Dänew	Lebap
Döwletabat	10,410	Watan	5	Dänew	Lebap
Gabakly	3,894	Gabaklyoba	4	Dänew	Lebap
Göýnük	10,017	Göýnük	5	Dänew	Lebap
Isbaz	2,625	Isbaz	2	Dänew	Lebap
Maý	9,630	Maý	6	Dänew	Lebap
Ödeý	8,987	Ödeý		Dänew	Lebap
Parahat	6,035	Parahat	2	Dänew	Lebap
Ýyldyz	7,939	Ýyldyz	7	Dänew	Lebap
Çarwadar	2,760	Çarwadar	1	Darganata	Lebap
Hojalyk	5,396	Hojalyk	2	Darganata	Lebap
Lebap	7,093	Kyrançoba	2	Darganata	Lebap
Magtymguly	2,349	Magtymguly	2	Darganata	Lebap
Sediwer	2,052	Sediwer	1	Darganata	Lebap
Berkararlyk	2,011	Berkararlyk	3	Döwletli	Lebap
Burguçy	11,338	Hatap	4	Döwletli	Lebap
Daşrabat	11,575	Daşrabat	5	Döwletli	Lebap
Hojahaýran	6,703	Hojahaýran	5	Döwletli	Lebap
Pagtaçy	3,344	Pagtaçy	3	Döwletli	Lebap
Tallymerjen	5,237	Tallymerjen	3	Döwletli	Lebap
Täzedurmuş	4,061	Täzedurmuş	3	Döwletli	Lebap
Türkmenistan	3,986	Tutlykak	8	Döwletli	Lebap
Ýalkym	11,417	Surhy	3	Döwletli	Lebap
Bitik	10,724	Magtymguly	8	Farap	Lebap
Garamyş	5,922	Garamyş	4	Farap	Lebap
Hanoba	7,175	Goýgala	4	Farap	Lebap
Hojakenepsi	9,026	Hojakenepsi	4	Farap	Lebap
Jendi	7,669	Jendi	6	Farap	Lebap
Kyraç	4,706	Kyraç	3	Farap	Lebap
Osty	4,037	Osty	2	Farap	Lebap
Akgala	6,758	Akgala	5	Garabekewül	Lebap
Ärsarybaba	5,417	Haryn	3	Garabekewül	Lebap
Baý	6,715	Baý	4	Garabekewül	Lebap
Dostluk	1,699	Abdallar	3	Garabekewül	Lebap
Lamma	4,070	Çakmak	2	Garabekewül	Lebap
Rahmançäge	1,223	Rahmançäge	2	Garabekewül	Lebap
Seýdi	7,097	Seýdi	6	Garabekewül	Lebap
Soltanýazgala	3,547	Soltanýazgala	1	Garabekewül	Lebap
Zelili	2,898	Berkarar zaman	2	Garabekewül	Lebap
Altyn asyr	18,447	Kazyaryk	6	Halaç	Lebap
Esenmeňli	18,393	Esenmeňli	4	Halaç	Lebap
Güneşlik	2,057	Güneşlik	1	Halaç	Lebap
Güýçbirleşik	8,747	Güýçbirleşik	2	Halaç	Lebap
Halaç	16,397	Ajy	5	Halaç	Lebap
Oguz han	6,239	Etbaş	3	Halaç	Lebap
Pelwert	12,115	Pelwert	3	Halaç	Lebap
Surh	12,467	Surh	3	Halaç	Lebap
Burdalyk	7,102	Burdalyk	2	Hojambaz	Lebap
Galkynyş	7,249	Babadaýhan	4	Hojambaz	Lebap
Gultak	6,689	Gultak	5	Hojambaz	Lebap
Gyzylgum	7,857	Çalyşlar	3	Hojambaz	Lebap
Kyrköýli	6,436	Kyrköýli	3	Hojambaz	Lebap
Mekan	6,810	Mekan	5	Hojambaz	Lebap
Surhy	6,491	Surhy	2	Hojambaz	Lebap
Çekir	28,622	Çekir	6	Kerki	Lebap
Daşlyk	11,669	Daşlyk	4	Kerki	Lebap
Guwak	10,065	Guwak	4	Kerki	Lebap
Gyzylaýak	6,221	Gyzylaýak	3	Kerki	Lebap
Hatap	7,777	Hatap	6	Kerki	Lebap
Akgumolam	5,977	Akgumolam	1	Köýtendag	Lebap
Çärjew	2,372	Çärjew	3	Köýtendag	Lebap
Garahowuz	3,128	Garahowuz	1	Köýtendag	Lebap
Garnas	9,326	Garnas	4	Köýtendag	Lebap
Garrygala	1,337	Garrygala		Köýtendag	Lebap
Köýten	7,940	Köýten	6	Köýtendag	Lebap
Megejik	7,600	Megejik	4	Köýtendag	Lebap
Ters	3,618	Ters	1	Köýtendag	Lebap
Zarpçy	1,297	Zarpçy	1	Köýtendag	Lebap
Awçy	8,804	Awçy	4	Saýat	Lebap
Bakjaçy	2,767	Bakjaçylar	1	Saýat	Lebap
Çarbagdepe	3,551	Tejribeçiler	3	Saýat	Lebap
Çekiç	4,397	Çekiçler	3	Saýat	Lebap
Çowdur	9,196	Çowdur	4	Saýat	Lebap
Esgi	8,613	Gyzylgaýa	3	Saýat	Lebap
Garamahmyt	3,497	Babadaýhan	2	Saýat	Lebap
Hojainebeg	2,564	Alpanoba	2	Saýat	Lebap
Jeňňel	7,433	Bereketli	5	Saýat	Lebap
Lebaby	4,872	Lebaby	4	Saýat	Lebap
Merýe	7,150	Goşdepe	3	Saýat	Lebap
Mülk	11,020	Mülk	6	Saýat	Lebap
Syýadagsakar	6,427	Syýadagsakar	3	Saýat	Lebap
Täzelikçi	1,605	Täzelikçi	1	Saýat	Lebap
Topurkak	818	Topurkak	1	Saýat	Lebap
Ýeňiş	2,535	Ýeňiş	1	Saýat	Lebap
Agaýusup	9,397	Şöhrat	3	Baýramaly	Mary
Azat	19,071	Azat	5	Baýramaly	Mary
Bagt	8,491	Bagt	4	Baýramaly	Mary
Bahar	7,027	Bahar	2	Baýramaly	Mary
Beýikköpri	10,263	Beýikköpri	5	Baýramaly	Mary
Erkana	5,558	Erkana	2	Baýramaly	Mary
Gadyrýap	14,773	Gadyrýap	4	Baýramaly	Mary
Gatakar	14,159	Aryk	4	Baýramaly	Mary
Guşlyoba	4,714	Guşlyoba	4	Baýramaly	Mary
Hangala	7,670	Garaýörme	1	Baýramaly	Mary
Höwesli	5,882	Höwesli	2	Baýramaly	Mary
Merw	12,984	Merw	2	Baýramaly	Mary
Murgap	8,732	Murgap	4	Baýramaly	Mary
Ýalkym	23,873	Ýalkym	9	Baýramaly	Mary
Akmeýdan	16,724	Akmeýdan	5	Garagum	Mary
Durnalyýap	4,971	Türkmenistan	2	Garagum	Mary
Göbeklidepe	5,878	Göbekli	2	Garagum	Mary
Sähra	2,673	Sähra	1	Garagum	Mary
Şatlyk	7,712	Şatlyk	2	Garagum	Mary
Tarpýer	4,053	Akjadepe	2	Garagum	Mary
Täzeoba	4,183	Täzeoba	1	Garagum	Mary
Abadanlyk	18,159	Garadepe	2	Mary	Mary
Adalat	5,782	Arykperreň	1	Mary	Mary
Ajap Mämmedowa	14,719	Ajap Mämmedowa	3	Mary	Mary
Gurama	9,226	Gurama	1	Mary	Mary
Akmyrat Hümmedow	8,901	Hojaýap	2	Mary	Mary
Akybaý	12,462	Akybaý	1	Mary	Mary
Aşgabat	20,661	Gowkyzereň	4	Mary	Mary
Atabaýew	4,887	Döwletli	1	Mary	Mary
Babasary	9,475	Babasary	1	Mary	Mary
Diýar	8,574	Kelteler	2	Mary	Mary
Jemgyýet	9,165	Müjewür	3	Mary	Mary
Mykgy Lorsy	10,498	Mykgy Lorsy	1	Mary	Mary
Peşanaly	7,910	Peşanaly	1	Mary	Mary
Ruhubelent	8,771	Mülksyçmaz	1	Mary	Mary
Täzegüýç	5,951	Täzeoba	3	Mary	Mary
Türkmen ýoly	3,813	Gojuklar	1	Mary	Mary
Azatlyk	6,238	Köşk	1	Murgap	Mary
Çäçdepe	12,784	Çäçdepe	1	Murgap	Mary
Çöňür	12,605	Çöňür	3	Murgap	Mary
Galkynyş	5,042	Çemçedepe	1	Murgap	Mary
Gatyýap	8,062	Gatyýap	2	Murgap	Mary
Gökdepe	11,802	Gökdepe	2	Murgap	Mary
Gowşutbent	10,372	Penjiwar	4	Murgap	Mary
Gylyçdurdy Sähetmyradow	8,716	Gylyçdurdy Sähetmyradow	1	Murgap	Mary
Hyrslan Jumaýew	12,744	Hyrslan Jumaýew	1	Murgap	Mary
Miras	7,064	Gowkuzereň	1	Murgap	Mary
Mülkýazy	14,655	Mülkýazy	3	Murgap	Mary
Rowaçlyk	7,728	Rowaçlyk	2	Murgap	Mary
Şordepe	12,956	Şordepe	3	Murgap	Mary
Suhty	14,259	Suhty	4	Murgap	Mary
Watan	9,215	Watan	2	Murgap	Mary
Ylham	5,113	Gojukkölýap	1	Murgap	Mary
Altyn zaman	2,752	Lälezar	1	Oguzhan	Mary
Deňizhan	1,851	Deňizhan	1	Oguzhan	Mary
Dostluk	2,899	Dostluk	2	Oguzhan	Mary
Gökhan	2,407	Gökhan	4	Oguzhan	Mary
Merdana	1,588	Azatlyk	1	Oguzhan	Mary
Ýyldyzhan	1,860	Ýyldyzhan	1	Oguzhan	Mary
Agzybir	10,304	Arkadag	2	Sakarçäge	Mary
Akýap	10,791	Akýap	2	Sakarçäge	Mary
Bereket	6,092	Bereket	1	Sakarçäge	Mary
Çaşgyn	15,470	Çaşgyn	1	Sakarçäge	Mary
Çerkezköl	12,976	Çerkezköl	1	Sakarçäge	Mary
Daýhan	11,141	Dogryýol	2	Sakarçäge	Mary
Garaýap	9,852	Garaýap	1	Sakarçäge	Mary
Görelde	8,043	Görelde	2	Sakarçäge	Mary
Gorgangala	4,777	Bagşy	1	Sakarçäge	Mary
Gülüstan	10,015	Hakykat	2	Sakarçäge	Mary
Gumgüzer	12,301	Gumgüzer	3	Sakarçäge	Mary
Gyzylgum	19,469	Böri	4	Sakarçäge	Mary
Hojadepe	5,761	Hojadepe	1	Sakarçäge	Mary
Keseýap	10,519	Keseýap	1	Sakarçäge	Mary
Sakarçäge	3,695	Düýedarçylyk	2	Sakarçäge	Mary
Soltanyz	5,178	Soltanyz	2	Sakarçäge	Mary
Söýünsary	8,119	Söýünsary	1	Sakarçäge	Mary
Ahal	2,724	Ahal	1	Tagtabazar	Mary
Çemenabat	3,250	Çemenabat	1	Tagtabazar	Mary
Daşköpri	2,243	Daşköpri	1	Tagtabazar	Mary
Erden	10,738	Erden	2	Tagtabazar	Mary
Galaýmor	4,151	Galaýmor	2	Tagtabazar	Mary
Gulja	14,808	Gulja	4	Tagtabazar	Mary
Marçak	13,717	Durdyýew	2	Tagtabazar	Mary
Pendi	11,468	Suhty	2	Tagtabazar	Mary
Sandykgaçy	7,169	Sandykgaçy	3	Tagtabazar	Mary
Saparmyrat Nyýazow	8,658	Baýraç	1	Tagtabazar	Mary
Saryýazy	5,204	Saryýazy	1	Tagtabazar	Mary
Serhetçi	3,866	Serhetçi	3	Tagtabazar	Mary
Söýünaly	8,823	Söýünaly	2	Tagtabazar	Mary
Üzümçilik	6,260	Ýaşlyk	2	Tagtabazar	Mary
Ýeňiş	2,322	Ýeňiş	1	Tagtabazar	Mary
Gatlaly	4 104	Gatlaly	3	Türkmengala	Mary
Hasyl	3,786	Hasyl	1	Türkmengala	Mary
Kemine	16,791	Kemine	4	Türkmengala	Mary
Magtymguly	6,602	Amaşaýap	4	Türkmengala	Mary
Rehnet	10,745	Erkana	7	Türkmengala	Mary
Serdarýap	10,790	Rahat	4	Türkmengala	Mary
Seýitnazar Seýdi	6,425	Ärsary	2	Türkmengala	Mary
Soltanýap	5,596	Ýyldyz	2	Türkmengala	Mary
Täzedaýhan	6,315	Çaňlybent	2	Türkmengala	Mary
Täzedünýä	11,701	Ýagty	3	Türkmengala	Mary
Täzeýol	7,780	Haryn	4	Türkmengala	Mary
Zähmet	7,559	Kälçe	3	Türkmengala	Mary
Akgoňur	18,282	Goňur	4	Wekilbazar	Mary
Alladurdy Gandymow	10,660	Watan	1	Wekilbazar	Mary
Çarlakýap	9,597	Çarlakýap	3	Wekilbazar	Mary
Egrigüzer	10,765	Egrigüzer	2	Wekilbazar	Mary
Gökje	13,133	Arzuw	3	Wekilbazar	Mary
Goňur	9,886	Garagoňur	2	Wekilbazar	Mary
Halyl	7,414	Halyl	1	Wekilbazar	Mary
Jumadurdy Atajanow	22,905	Jumadurdy Atajanow	5	Wekilbazar	Mary
Mollanepes	10,901	Gara	1	Wekilbazar	Mary
Mülkamaşa	9,943	Magtymguly	2	Wekilbazar	Mary
Mülkbükri	10,899	Mülkbükri	1	Wekilbazar	Mary
Mülkýusup	10,048	Mülkýusup	3	Wekilbazar	Mary
Rysgally	9,844	Türkmenistan	2	Wekilbazar	Mary
Täzedurmuş	7,441	Täzedurmuş	2	Wekilbazar	Mary
Agzybirlik	10,642	Agzybirlik	3	Ýolöten	Mary
Ahunbaba	12,458	Zindigani	4	Ýolöten	Mary
Akgüzer	6,151	Akgüzer	3	Ýolöten	Mary
Arkadag	2,490	Azatlyk	1	Ýolöten	Mary
Baýraç	8,968	Janybek	3	Ýolöten	Mary
Döwletli	3,533	Döwletli	1	Ýolöten	Mary
Garaköl	3,504	Garaköl	2	Ýolöten	Mary
Gammarbaba	10,753	Ýeňiş	3	Ýolöten	Mary
Goýunjy	6,535	Goýunjy	2	Ýolöten	Mary
Hakykat	7,833	Hakykat	1	Ýolöten	Mary
Hüjüm	5,114	Hüjüm	2	Ýolöten	Mary
Momataý	6,876	Momataý	3	Ýolöten	Mary
Rahat	6,296	Awçy	4	Ýolöten	Mary
Şöhrat	3,876	Şöhrat	1	Ýolöten	Mary
Soltanbent	12,571	Dostluk	6	Ýolöten	Mary
Ymambaba	6,432	Ymambaba	2	Ýolöten	Mary
Ýokary Suhty	10,875	Ýokary Suhty	5	Ýolöten	Mary

== Former councils ==
- Gorjaw Rural council, abolished. Now part of the city of Arkadag.
- Gulmaç Rural council, abolished on 10 December 2022, replaced by the town of Galkynyş.
- Täzeýol Rural council, abolished on 8 September 2025, replaced by the town of Bitaraplyk.
