= List of municipalities in Balkan Province =

Map of the five provinces of Turkmenistan. Balkan is highlighted in red.

This article is referencing as a list all lawfully recognized municipalities of Balkan Province, Turkmenistan. Since December 10, 2022, there are 137 municipalities in Balkan, including two cities with district status, six cities, 15 towns, and 114 villages.

In Turkmenistan, any administrative division, including municipalities, is designated by law and may be changed by decree by the Assembly of Turkmenistan, as stated by the 23rd article of the constitution. They all are referenced in a list rarely shared by the Turkmen government, yet available for consultation through the 2022 census.

Criticized by external observers, the census figures should be taken very carefully as they seem to overestimate the actual population of the country.

== Lists ==
Municipalities listed here are sorted by their administrative division, then by alphabetical order.

=== Cities ===
The names of cities with district status are written in bold text.

Name	Population (2022)	District
**Balkanabat**	123,190	**Balkanabat**
Bereket	23,697	Bereket
Esenguly	12,918	Esenguly
Etrek	12,508	Etrek
Gyzylarbat	48,558	Gyzylarbat
Magtymguly	15,386	Magtymguly
Garabogaz	7,877	Türkmenbaşy
**Türkmenbaşy**	91,745	**Türkmenbaşy**

=== Towns ===
Name	Population (2022)	District
Gumdag	30,884	Balkanabat
Hazar	14,671	Balkanabat
Jebel	15,056	Balkanabat
Oglanly	1,715	Balkanabat
Uzboý	730	Balkanabat
Galkynyş		Bereket District
Ekerem	3,972	Esenguly District
Garadepe	9,016	Esenguly District
Janahyr	3,664	Gyzylarbat District
Akdaş	6,750	Türkmenbaşy District
Belek	1,720	Türkmenbaşy District
Guwlymaýak	1,853	Türkmenbaşy District
Gyzylgaýa	993	Türkmenbaşy District
Gyzylsuw	859	Türkmenbaşy District
Türkmenbaşy	7,334	Türkmenbaşy District

=== Villages ===
Villages which hold the seat of their rural council are bolded.

Name	Population (2022)	District	Included in
Garagöl	765	Balkanabat	Hazar
123-nji duralga	155	Balkanabat	Jebel
Mollagara	492	Balkanabat	Jebel
Zähmet	113	Balkanabat	Jebel
Oglanly	658	Balkanabat	Oglanly
Gamakly	159	Bereket	Galkynyş
Gulmaç	1,998	Bereket	Galkynyş
Isgender	858	Bereket	Galkynyş
Ok	590	Bereket	Galkynyş
Öýleguşluk	513	Bereket	Galkynyş
Akjaguýma	119	Bereket	Oboý geňeşligi
Arkaç	383	Bereket	Oboý geňeşligi
Aýdyň	1,513	Bereket	Oboý geňeşligi
Çitli	230	Bereket	Oboý geňeşligi
Däneata	96	Bereket	Oboý geňeşligi
**Oboý**	1,890	Bereket	Oboý geňeşligi
Magtymguly	351	Bereket	S.A. Nyýazow adyndaky geňeşlik
**Uzynsuw**	1,676	Bereket	S.A. Nyýazow adyndaky geňeşlik
Uzynsuw bekedi	483	Bereket	S.A. Nyýazow adyndaky geňeşlik
Türkmenistan	351	Bereket	S.A. Nyýazow adyndaky geňeşlik
Ajyguýy	536	Bereket	Ýasga geňeşligi
Burgun	676	Bereket	Ýasga geňeşligi
Düwünçi	532	Bereket	Ýasga geňeşligi
Garaýylgyn	79	Bereket	Ýasga geňeşligi
Jemal	331	Bereket	Ýasga geňeşligi
Kiçijikýazy	63	Bereket	Ýasga geňeşligi
**Ýasga**	1,460	Bereket	Ýasga geňeşligi
**Ajyýap**	4,042	Esenguly	Ajyýap geňeşligi
Alaňňyrtly	179	Esenguly	Bugdaýly geňeşligi
Balguýy	304	Esenguly	Bugdaýly geňeşligi
**Bugdaýly**	3,041	Esenguly	Bugdaýly geňeşligi
Gögerendag	1,679	Esenguly	Bugdaýly geňeşligi
Orunçäge	467	Esenguly	Bugdaýly geňeşligi
Şahman	1,411	Esenguly	Bugdaýly geňeşligi
Yňdarlan	91	Esenguly	Bugdaýly geňeşligi
**Çaloýyk**	1,989	Esenguly	Çaloýyk geňeşligi
Bazarly	188	Esenguly	Çekişler geňeşligi
**Çekişler**	2,213	Esenguly	Çekişler geňeşligi
Gamyşlyja	2,086	Esenguly	Ekerem
**Garadegiş**	1,840	Esenguly	Garadegiş geňeşligi
**Akýaýla**	1,163	Etrek	Akýaýla geňeşligi
Çetli	364	Etrek	Akýaýla geňeşligi
Güdürolum	529	Etrek	Akýaýla geňeşligi
**Garaagaç**	615	Etrek	Garaagaç geňeşligi
**Gyzylbaýyr**	3,516	Etrek	Gyzylbaýyr geňeşligi
**Madaw**	5,052	Etrek	Madaw geňeşligi
Çerkezli	1,150	Gyzylarbat	Arkaç geňeşligi
Garabogaz	2,836	Gyzylarbat	Arkaç geňeşligi
Melegoç	136	Gyzylarbat	Arkaç geňeşligi
**Rowaç**	1,084	Gyzylarbat	Arkaç geňeşligi
Tutly	2,094	Gyzylarbat	Arkaç geňeşligi
Ýalkym	254	Gyzylarbat	Arkaç geňeşligi
Ýylgynly	109	Gyzylarbat	Arkaç geňeşligi
**Azady**	924	Gyzylarbat	Azady adyndaky geňeşlik
Hasar	377	Gyzylarbat	Azady adyndaky geňeşlik
Sarp	369	Gyzylarbat	Azady adyndaky geňeşlik
Şatlyk	377	Gyzylarbat	Azady adyndaky geňeşlik
Ýaşlyk	379	Gyzylarbat	Azady adyndaky geňeşlik
**Goç**	1,579	Gyzylarbat	Goç geňeşligi
Goç bekedi	486	Gyzylarbat	Goç geňeşligi
Parahat	236	Gyzylarbat	Goç geňeşligi
Zaw	532	Gyzylarbat	Goç geňeşligi
Zaw bekedi	136	Gyzylarbat	Goç geňeşligi
Bendesen	1,269	Gyzylarbat	Hasar geňeşligi
**Çukur**	915	Gyzylarbat	Hasar geňeşligi
Jejirs	180	Gyzylarbat	Hasar geňeşligi
**Hojagala**	1,917	Gyzylarbat	Hojagala geňeşligi
Arkaç	186	Gyzylarbat	Janahyr
Janahyr bekedi	346	Gyzylarbat	Paraw geňeşligi
**Paraw**	1,070	Gyzylarbat	Paraw geňeşligi
**Purnuwar**	1,652	Gyzylarbat	Purnuwar geňeşligi
**Ak**	918	Magtymguly	Çendir geňeşligi
Gyzylymam	1,396	Magtymguly	Çendir geňeşligi
Ýartygala	957	Magtymguly	Çendir geňeşligi
Gargyly	629	Magtymguly	Daghojagala geňeşligi
**Hojagala**	740	Magtymguly	Daghojagala geňeşligi
**Daýna**	1,161	Magtymguly	Daýna geňeşligi
Arapata	118	Magtymguly	Gerkez geňeşligi
Arapjyk	382	Magtymguly	Gerkez geňeşligi
Magtymgala	422	Magtymguly	Gerkez geňeşligi
Uzyntokaý	108	Magtymguly	Gerkez geňeşligi
**Ýuwangala**	1,286	Magtymguly	Gerkez geňeşligi
Çukurýurt	542	Magtymguly	Könekesir geňeşligi
**Könekesir**	2,846	Magtymguly	Könekesir geňeşligi
Aýdere	154	Magtymguly	Kürüždeý geňeşligi
Durdyhan	556	Magtymguly	Kürüždeý geňeşligi
Duzlydepe	778	Magtymguly	Kürüždeý geňeşligi
**Kürüždeý**	1,108	Magtymguly	Kürüždeý geňeşligi
Tutlygala	1,088	Magtymguly	Kürüždeý geňeşligi
Gyzyl	373	Magtymguly	Magtymguly
Garakel	941	Magtymguly	Ýankel geňeşligi
Näre	605	Magtymguly	Ýankel geňeşligi
Sakgar	1,268	Magtymguly	Ýankel geňeşligi
**Ýankel**	902	Magtymguly	Ýankel geňeşligi
Garaşsyzlyk	211	Türkmenbaşy	Akdaş
**Akguýy**	389	Türkmenbaşy	Akguýy geňeşligi
Goşaoba	130	Türkmenbaşy	Akguýy geňeşligi
Gürje	480	Türkmenbaşy	Akguýy geňeşligi
Hudaýberdi	575	Türkmenbaşy	Akguýy geňeşligi
Irikli	277	Türkmenbaşy	Akguýy geňeşligi
Soýli	25	Türkmenbaşy	Akguýy geňeşligi
Ybyk	385	Türkmenbaşy	Akguýy geňeşligi
126-njy duralga	93	Türkmenbaşy	Belek
129-njy duralga	104	Türkmenbaşy	Belek
Garateňir	114	Türkmenbaşy	Belek
Awlamyş	189	Türkmenbaşy	Çagyl geňeşligi
**Çagyl**	808	Türkmenbaşy	Çagyl geňeşligi
Tüwer	222	Türkmenbaşy	Çagyl geňeşligi
Garaaýman	118	Türkmenbaşy	Goýmat geňeşligi
Gökdere	513	Türkmenbaşy	Goýmat geňeşligi
**Goýmat**	427	Türkmenbaşy	Goýmat geňeşligi
Hasan	508	Türkmenbaşy	Türkmenbaşy
Sülmen	195	Türkmenbaşy	Türkmenbaşy
Ýaňyajy	970	Türkmenbaşy	Türkmenbaşy

== See also ==
- Cities of Turkmenistan
- Towns of Turkmenistan
- List of cities, towns and villages in Turkmenistan
- Demographics of Turkmenistan
