= Daşköpri =

Daşköpri Daşköpri obasy
- Village
- Location in Turkmenistan
- Coordinates: 36°16′17″N 62°39′10″E
- Country: Turkmenistan
- Province: Mary Province
- District: Tagtabazar District
- Rural council: Daşköpri geňeşligi
- Elevation: 323 m (1,060 ft)

Population (2022 official census)
  - Total: 2,243
- Time zone: UTC+05:00 (TMT)

Daşköpri, previously known as Tashkepri (in Russian: Ташкепри), is a village in Tagtabazar District, Mary Province, Turkmenistan. It is located circa 40 km northwest of Tagtabazar, along the Murgap river. In 2022, it had a population of 2,243 people.

== Etymology ==
In Turkmen, Daşköpri is a compound of two words: "Daş" and "Köpri," which translate to "Stone" and "Bridge" respectively.

== History ==
On 26 December 1991, the villages of Çemenabat, Daşköpri and Galaýmor were transferred from Tagtabazar District to Serhetabat District.

On 1st August 2016, the nearby village of Daşköpri bekedi was merged with Daşköpri by decree. The same decree transferred the village's rural council from Serhetabat District to Tagtabazar District.
