= Sandykgaçy =

Sandykgaçy Sandykgaçy obasy
- Village
- Location within Turkmenistan
- Coordinates: 36.54376°N 62.556083°E
- Country: Turkmenistan
- Province: Mary
- District: Tagtabazar District
- Rural council: Sandykgaçy geňeşligi
- Elevation: 301 m (988 ft)

Population (2022 official census)
  - Total: 4,488
- Time zone: UTC+5 (TMT)
  - Summer (DST): UTC+5 (TMT)

Sandykgaçy, briefly known as Miweli, is a village in Tagtabazar District, Mary Province, Turkmenistan. It is located on the Murgap River, circa 70 km northwest of Tagtabazar. In 2022, it had a population of 4,488 people.

== Etymology ==
The Turkmen word sandykgaçy means "box". Atanyyazow explains that in antiquity the name appeared as "Sandykgachan", meaning "boxed (in)", because of the high, steep slopes that enclose the village.

The village was briefly known as "Miweli," which is composed of "Miwe," which translates to "Fruit," and the suffix "-li," which is used to form adjectives. The whole word may be translated as "Fruity" or as "[a place] with fruits." On 10 May 2010, the name was reversed to Sandykgaçy.

== History ==
The Panjdeh Incident was an armed engagement between the Emirate of Afghanistan and the Russian Empire in 1885 that led to a diplomatic crisis between the Russian and the British Empires regarding the Russian expansion south-eastwards towards the Emirate of Afghanistan and the British Raj (India). It happened near Sandykgaçy.

During the Soviet era, Sandykgaçy was the center of a fruit and vegetable sovkhoz. The sovkhoz then became a rural council in post-soviet Turkmenistan.

== Transportation ==
The village is served by both the A-388 highway between Serhetabat and Ýolöten and a station on the rail line to Serhetabat.

== Rural Council ==
Sandykgaçy is the seat of a rural council including three villages:

- Sandykgaçy, village
- 27-nji oktýabr, village
- Bagçylyk, village
