= Gökdere, Turkmenistan =

Village in Balkan Region, Turkmenistan

Gökdere Gökdere obasy
- Village
- Location in Turkmenistan
- Coordinates: 40°21′01″N 55°31′34″E
- Country: Turkmenistan
- Province: Balkan Province
- District: Türkmenbaşy District
- Rural Council: Goýmat geňeşligi

Population (2022 official census)
  - Total: 513
- Time zone: UTC+5

Gökdere is a village in Türkmenbaşy District, Balkan Province, Turkmenistan. In 2022, it had a population of 513 people.

== Etymology ==
In Turkmen, Gökdere is the compound of two words: "Gök" and "Dere," which mean "Blue" and "Valley" or "Stream" respectively.

== Rural Council ==
The village is included, along with two other villages, in a rural council (geňeşlik) which seats in the village of Goýmat:

- Goýmat, village

== Society ==
In 2018, RFE/RL mentioned a lack in social policies in remote villages of Balkan Province. They also mention the withdrawal of farming activities following former President Nyýazow's "New Villages' policy" from Gyzylgaýa and villages around.

== See also ==
- List of municipalities in Balkan Province
