= Aýdere =

Aýdere Aýdere obasy
- Location in Turkmenistan
- Coordinates: 38°24′N 56°45′E
- Country: Turkmenistan
- Province: Balkan Province
- District: Magtymguly District
- Rural Council: Kürüždeý geňeşligi

Population (2022 official census)
  - Total: 154

Aýdere is a village in the Kopet Dag mountains of south-western Turkmenistan, in Magtymguly District, Balkan Province near the border with Iran. Aýdere is on the Sumbar River near its confluence with the Aýdere River. In 2022, it had a population of 154 people.

== Etymology ==
In Turkmen, Aýdere is a compound of the words "Aý" and "Dere" which mean "Moon" and "Valley" or "Stream" respectively.

== Rural Council ==
The village is included, along with four other villages, in a rural council (geňeşlik) which seats in the village of Kürüždeý.

- Kürüždeý, village
- Aýdere, village
- Durdyhan, village
- Duzlydepe, village
- Tutlygala, village

== See also ==
- List of municipalities in Balkan Province
