= Hojagala (disambiguation) =

Hojagala is a name for Turkmen toponyms. It may refer to:

== Places ==
- Hojagala, a town in Çärjew District, Lebap Province

=== Villages ===
- Hojagala, Gyzylarbat District, a village Balkan Province
- Hojagala, Magtymguly District, a village Balkan Province
