= Paraw, Gyzylarbat District =

Paraw Paraw obasy
- Village
- Location in Turkmenistan
- Coordinates: 39°01′51″N 56°03′39″E
- Country: Turkmenistan
- Province: Balkan Province
- District: Gyzylarbat District
- Rural Council: Paraw geňeşligi

Population (2022 official census)
  - Total: 1,070
- Time zone: UTC+5

Paraw, also known as Parau (in Russian: Парау) or Farāva (in Persian: "فراوه") is a village in Gyzylarbat District, Balkan Province, Turkmenistan. The Paraw Bibi Mausoleum, which is argued to be among the most revered shrines in the country, stands on a nearby mound; the Parau Ata Mausoleum lies within the ruins of the ancient city of Paraw. The nearest town is Janahyr and the nearest city is Gyzylarbat. In 2022, Paraw had a population of 1,070 people.

== Etymology ==
Paraw as a name might from a nearby mountain called Partaw. Taw is a word that roughly translate as "Mountain," and "Par" might be a reference to the Parni, an ancient Iranian tribe.

== History ==
Paraw might have been founded during the Dahae era by the Parni tribe.

== Rural Council ==
The village is the seat of a rural council (geňeşlik) including two villages:

- Paraw, village
- Janahyr bekedi, village

== See also ==
- List of municipalities in Balkan Province
