= Galaýmor =

Galaýmor Galaýmor obasy
- Village
- Location within Turkmenistan
- Coordinates: 35°39′14″N 62°33′22″E
- Country: Turkmenistan
- Province: Mary
- District: Tagtabazar District
- Rural council: Galaýmor geňeşligi
- Elevation: 401 m (1,316 ft)

Population (2022 official census)
  - Total: 4,067
- Time zone: UTC+5 (TMT)
  - Summer (DST): UTC+5 (TMT)

Galaýmor, also known as Morgala or Kala-I-Mor ("Кала-И-Мор") in Russian, is a village in Tagtabazar District, Mary Province, Turkmenistan. The village is located circa 45 km north of Serhetabat and 45 km south of Tagtabazar, along the Guşgy river. It is the seat of Galaýmor Rural Council. In 2022, it had a population of 4,067 people.

== Etymology ==
Atanyyazow notes that the traditional Turkmen name of this village is Morgala, in which -gala presumably means fortress. The origin and meaning of mor-, however, are unclear. He mentions that a fortress called Mori-Shaburgan existed here under the Mongols. Atanyyazow also notes that Khiva historians referred to the valley as Mori Suy ("Mori Water") and that local whitebeards call the area Morsuvi ("Mor Water"). Some meanings of mor- include clay pipes for delivering drinking water, and the colors pink and brown in some Turkmen dialects, among others. Atanyyazow discounts a folk legend attributing the name to the Persian word moor ("ant"), which would yield "ant fortress".

== History ==
The village is located on the left bank of the Guşgy River. In Soviet times it was classed as a "town of urban type" (посёлoк городского типа) from 1947 on, and was the site of a Karakul sheep state farm.

On 26 December 1991, the villages of Çemenabat, Daşköpri and Galaýmor were transferred from Tagtabazar District to Serhetabat District. Serhetabat District was abolished on 9 November 2022 and merged with Tagtabazar District.

== Population ==
1959	1970	1979	1989	2022
5,384	6,148	6,502	2,675	4,067

== Rural Council ==
Galaýmor is the seat of a rural council including two villages:

- Galaýmor, village
- Orazbaba, village

== Transportation ==
The airfield in Galaýmor is being upgraded and a new passenger terminal was being constructed as of 2019. The village is served by an eponymous rail station on the Mary-Serhetabat line.
