= Hojagala =

Hojagala Hojagala şäherçesi
- Town
- Location in Turkmenistan
- Coordinates: 39°07′57″N 63°26′21″E
- Country: Turkmenistan
- Province: Lebap Province
- District: Çärjew District

Population (2022 official census)
  - Total: 4,752
- Time zone: UTC+5

Hojagala, formerly known as Oktyabr'sk (in Russian: "Октябрьск") or as the "Kolkhoz named after halturin" ("Колхоз имени Халтурина"), is a town in Çärjew District, Lebap Province, Turkmenistan. In 2022, it had a population of 4,752 people.

This town should not be confused with the village of the same name in Gyzylarbat District, Balkan Province, or the village of the same name in Magtymguly District, Balkan Province.

== Etymology ==
In Turkmen, Hojagala is a compound of the words "Hoja," derivated from the persian word "خواجه," romanized: "Khwāja," which roughly translates as "Lord," or "Master," and "Gala," which means both a "Fortress" and a "Town."
