= Ak, Turkmenistan =

Village in Balkan Province, Turkmenistan

Ak Ak obasy
- Village
- Location in Turkmenistan
- Coordinates: 38°08′50″N 56°07′09″E
- Country: Turkmenistan
- Province: Balkan Province
- District: Magtymguly District
- Rural Council: Çendir geňeşligi
- Establishment: 18th century

Population (2022 official census)
  - Total: 918
- Time zone: UTC+5

Ak is a village in Magtymguly District, Balkan Province, Turkmenistan. It is located 260 km east of Ashgabat and it had a population of 918 people in 2022.

== Etymology ==
Ak is the Turkmen word for "White."

The name of the rural council centered around Ak, "Çendir", is borrowed from the seasonal stream flowing south of the village.

== Rural Council ==
The village is the seat of a rural council (geňeşlik) including three villages:

- Ak, village
- Gyzylymam, village
- Ýartygala, village

== See also ==
- List of municipalities in Balkan Province
