= Etrek =

Etrek may refer to:

- Atrek River, a river in Iran and Turkmenistan
- Etrek District, a district in Balkan Province, Turkmenistan
- Etrek, Turkmenistan, a city in Balkan Province, Turkmenistan, capital of Etrek District
