= Gyzylbaýyr =

Gyzylbaýyr Gyzylbaýyr obasy
- Location in Turkmenistan
- Coordinates: 38°13′N 55°38′E
- Country: Turkmenistan
- Province: Balkan Province
- District: Etrek District
- Rural Council: Gyzylbaýyr geňeşligi
- Time zone: UTC+5

Gyzylbaýyr, formerly known as Şarlawuk (in Russian: "Шарлоук"), is a village in far south-western Turkmenistan, in Etrek District, Balkan Province. It lies on the Atrek River not far from the border with Iran and is bisected by the P-15 highway between Serdar and Etrek.

== See also ==
- List of municipalities in Balkan Province
