= Çäçe =

Çäçe Çäçe obasy
- Village
- Location in Turkmenistan
- Coordinates: 36°45′20″N 60°28′22″E
- Country: Turkmenistan
- Province: Ahal Province
- Districts: Altyn asyr District
- Rural council: Çäçe geňeşligi

Population (2022 official census)
  - Total: 5,067
- Time zone: UTC+5

Çäçe, known in Russian as Chaacha ("Чаача"), is a village near the border with Iran in Altyn asyr District, Ahal Province, Turkmenistan. In 2022, it had a population of 5,067 people.

== History ==
Çäçe was initially located 6 km east of its current location. Soviet maps distinctly display two villages: Akjadepe and Çäçe. Current aerial pictures show the previous location of Çäçe destroyed. Çäçe is listed in the 2022 census while Akjadepe is not, suggesting Çäçe has been moved to then-Akjadepe.

As Altyn asyr District was briefly abolished on 5 January 2018, the village was moved to Kaka District along with the village of Mäne. Altyn asyr District was re-established on 19 September 2025, and both villages moved back.

== See also ==
- List of municipalities in Ahal Province
