= Ajyýap =

Ajyýap Ajyýap obasy
- Village
- Location in Turkmenistan
- Coordinates: 37°25′11″N 54°9′30″E
- Country: Turkmenistan
- Province: Balkan Province
- District: Esenguly District
- Rural Council: Ajyýap geňeşligi

Population (2022 official census)
  - Total: 4,042
- Time zone: UTC+5

Ajyýap is a village in far south-western Turkmenistan about 15 km from the border with Iran. It is located in Esenguly District, Balkan Province and is the center of its own rural council in which it stands as the only village. In 2022, it had a population of 4,042 people. It has productive oil fields.

== See also ==
- List of municipalities in Balkan Province
