= Gökdepe (disambiguation) =

Gökdepe is a toponym made from two Turkmen words: "Gök," which means "Blue," and "Depe," which roughly translates to "Hill" or "Mound." It might refer to the following locations:

== Turkmenistan ==
- Gökdepe, a city is Ahal Province and capital of Gökdepe District
- Gökdepe District, a district in Ahal Province

=== Villages ===
- Gökdepe, Garabekewül, a village in Garabekewül District, Lebap Province
- Gökdepe, Gökdepe, a village in Gökdepe District, Ahal Province
- Gökdepe, Murgap, a village in Murgap District, Mary Province
