= Hojagala, Gyzylarbat District =

Hojagala Hojagala obasy
- Village
- Location in Turkmenistan
- Coordinates: 38°42′38″N 56°20′18″E
- Country: Turkmenistan
- Province: Balkan Province
- District: Gyzylarbat District
- Rural Council: Hojagala geňeşligi

Population (2022 official census)
  - Total: 1,917
- Time zone: UTC+5

Hojagala is a village in Gyzylarbat District of Balkan Province, Turkmenistan. It is the seat of a rural council of the same name, in which Hojagala is the only village. In 2022, the village had a population of 1,917 people.

This village should not be confused with the village of the same name in Magtymguly District, Balkan Province, or the town of the same name in Çärjew District, Lebap Province.

== Etymology ==
In Turkmen, Hojagala is a compound of the words "Hoja," derivated from the Persian word "خواجه," romanized: "Khwāja," which roughly translates as "Lord," or "Master," and "Gala," which means both a "Fortress" and a "Town."

== See also ==
- List of municipalities in Balkan Province
