= Hojagala, Magtymguly District =

Hojagala Hojagala obasy
- Village
- Location in Turkmenistan
- Coordinates: 38°15′05″N 56°48′34″E
- Country: Turkmenistan
- Province: Balkan Province
- District: Magtymguly District
- Rural Council: Daghojagala geňeşligi

Population (2022 official census)
  - Total: 740
- Time zone: UTC+5

Hojagala is a village in Magtymguly District of Balkan Province, Turkmenistan. Lying on the border with Iran, it is the seat of Daghojagala rural council. In 2022, the village had a population of 740 people.

This village should not be confused with the village of the same name in Gyzylarbat District, Balkan Province, or the town of the same name in Çärjew District, Lebap Province.

== Etymology ==
In Turkmen, Hojagala is a compound of the words "Hoja," derivated from the Persian word "خواجه," romanized: "Khwāja," which roughly translates as "Lord," or "Master," and "Gala," which means both a "Fortress" and a "Town."

The word "Dag" in the name "Daghojagala" translates as both "Mountain" and "Hill."

== Rural Council ==
The village is the seat of a rural council (geňeşlik) including two villages:

- Hojagala, village
- Gargyly, village

== See also ==
- List of municipalities in Balkan Province
