= Goýmat =

Goýmat Goýmat obasy
- Village
- Location in Turkmenistan
- Coordinates: 40°26′57″N 55°51′23″E
- Country: Turkmenistan
- Province: Balkan Province
- District: Türkmenbaşy District
- Rural Council: Goýmat geňeşligi

Population (2022 official census)
  - Total: 427
- Time zone: UTC+5

Goýmat is a village in Türkmenbaşy District, Balkan Province, Turkmenistan. It is the seat of a rural council of the same name. In 2022, it had a population of 427 people.

== History ==
According to the government of Turkmenistan, Goýmat is the site of an ancient well in the Garagum desert.

== Rural council ==
The village is the seat of a rural council (geňeşlik) including three villages:

- Goýmat, village
- Garaaýman, village
- Gökdere, village

== See also ==
- List of municipalities in Balkan Province
