= Gyzylgaýa, Saýat =

Village in Turkmenistan

Gyzylgaýa Gyzylgaýa obasy
- Village
- Location in Turkmenistan
- Coordinates: 38°47′47″N 63°55′00″E
- Country: Turkmenistan
- Province: Lebap Province
- District: Saýat District
- Rural Council: Esgi geňeşligi

Population (2022 official census)
  - Total: 4,278
- Time zone: UTC+5

Gyzylgaýa, formerly known as the "Kolkhoz named after Kalinin" (in Russian: "Колхоз имени Калинина"), is a village in Saýat District, Lebap Province, Turkmenistan. It should not be confused with Gyzylgaýa, Türkmenbaşy District, Balkan Province. In 2022, Gyzylgaýa had a population of 4,278 people.

== Etymology ==
In Turkmen, Gyzylgaýa is a compound of the words "Gyzyl" and "Gaýa", meaning "Red" and "Crag" or "Cliff" respectively. The mention of red color in former soviet toponyms is common.

== Rural Council ==
The village is the seat of a rural council (geňeşlik) including three villages:

- Gyzylgaýa, village
- Esli, village
- Ýagtyýol, village
