= Gämi =

Gämi Gämi obasy
- Village
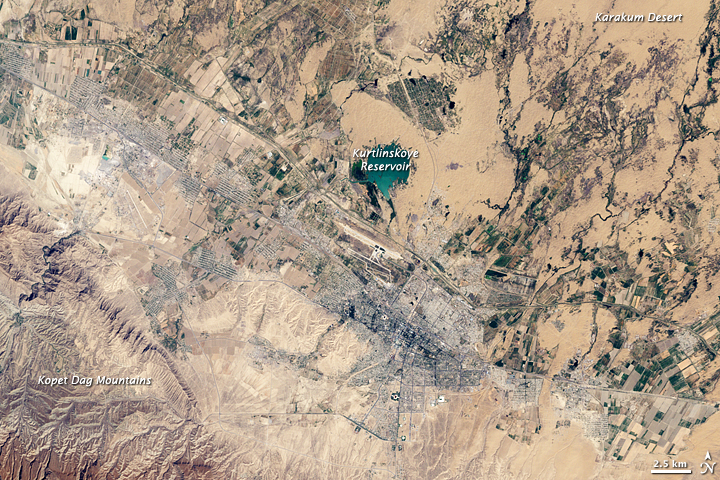
- Gämi and its agricultural land can be seen to the south-east of Ashgabat from space

- Location in Turkmenistan
- Coordinates: 37°54′23″N 58°28′10″E
- Country: Turkmenistan
- Province: Ahal Province
- District: Ak bugdaý District
- Rural Council: Gämi geňeşligi

Population (2022 official census)
  - Total: 18,148
- Time zone: UTC+5

Gämi is a village located in Ak bugdaý District, Ahal Province, Turkmenistan. Although being located in the immediate southeastern outskirts of Ashgabat, approximately 5 kilometres from the city centre, it is not legally called a suburb. It lies on the M37 highway which connects Ashgabat to Änew. In 2022, it had a population of 18,148 people, making it the most populated rural settlement in Turkmenistan.

== Overview ==
The local economy is based around cotton, wheat and vegetable production. The state policy provides tax-free land and water, fertilizers and agricultural equipment services at privileged prices to farmers in the village.

== Rural Council ==
The village is the seat of a rural council (geňeşlik) including two villages:

- Gämi, village
- Ýeketut, village

== See also ==
- List of cities, towns and villages in Turkmenistan
- List of municipalities in Ahal Province
