= Tagtabazar =

Tagtabazar Tagtabazar şäherçesi
- Town
- Location in Turkmenistan
- Coordinates: 35°57′22″N 62°55′04″E
- Country: Turkmenistan
- Province: Mary Province
- District: Tagtabazar District

Population (2022 official census)
  - Total: 13,312
- Time zone: UTC+5 (+5)

Tagtabazar, formerly known as Panjdeh or Pendi, is a town and capital of Tagtabazar District in the Mary Province of Turkmenistan. It is located roughly 20 km west of the Afghanistan–Turkmenistan border, along the Murgap River. In 2022, it had a population of 13,312 people.

== History ==
Tagtabazar was initially located circa 20 km west of its current location; 20 km south of Daşköpri, and 4 km north of the current village of Dostluk.

In February 1885, the Russian Empire, expanding southwards, entered the Panjdeh oasis. As no border had been decided then, they confronted Afghan soldiers, backed by the British Empire. After clashes causing hundreds of casualties, the Russian and the British agreed to eventually define the Afghan border, avoiding a large-scale war between the two empires. This episode is now known as the Panjdeh incident, or as the battle of the Kushka by the Russian. A monument dedicated to fallen soldiers lies north of the current village of Dostluk.

On 9 November 2022, Serhetabat District was merged into Tagtabazar District.

== See also ==
- List of municipalities in Mary Province
- Panjdeh incident
- Towns of Turkmenistan
