= Çemenabat =

Çemenabat Çemenabat obasy
- Village
- Location within Turkmenistan
- Coordinates: 35.44857°N 62.397812°E
- Country: Turkmenistan
- Province: Mary
- District: Tagtabazar District
- Rural council: Çemenabat geňeşligi
- Elevation: 549 m (1,801 ft)

Population (2022 official census)
  - Total: 3,250
- Time zone: UTC+5 (TMT)
  - Summer (DST): UTC+5 (TMT)

Çemenabat, also known as Çemenebit or Çemenibit (in Russian: Чеменивит), is a village in Mary Province, Tagtabazar District, Turkmenistan. The settlement lies along a railway and the Guşgy River, circa 20 km away from Serhetabat and the border with Afghanistan. It is the only village and the seat of the Çemenabat rural council. In 2022, it had a population of 3,250 people.

== Etymology ==
In Turkmen, Çemenabat is a compound of the word "Çemen" that roughly translates as "Meadow," and the Persian word "Abat," which refers to a settled place.

It used to be spelled "Chemenibit" by the Russian. The name of the village was officially changed by parliamentary decree on 15 August 2009.
