= Babaarap =

Village in Ahal Province, Turkmenistan

Babaarap Babaarap obasy
- Village
- Location within Turkmenistan
- Coordinates: 38°05′50″N 58°06′30″E
- Country: Turkmenistan
- Province: Ahal
- District: Gökdepe District
- Rural council: Babaarap geňeşligi

Population (2022 official census)
  - Total: 9,681
- Time zone: UTC+5

Babaarap, also spelled Babarap, or formerly Baba-Arab (in Russian: Баба-Араб), is a village in located in Gökdepe District, Ahal Province, in southern Turkmenistan. In 2022, it had a population of 9,681 people.

== Etymology ==
In Turkmen, Babaarap is a compound of two words: Baba and Arap, which mean "Grandfather" and "Arab" respectively.

== Overview ==
Historically, Baraarap is the name of three villages in Akhal Teke uezd in the Trans-Caspian region, located not far from the station Geok-Tepe of the Trans-Caspian railway. It is located in Akhal Teke oasis, in the foothills of Kopet Dag. Located near the train station, 45 km north-west of Ashgabat, Babarap is a large center of vegetable growing, viticulture and winemaking. It is the birthplace of former President of Turkmenistan, Gurbanguly Berdimuhamedow.

== Geography ==
Not far from the village passes through the Trans-Caspian railway and the М37 highway, a large traffic intersection. From the north of the village passes through the Karakum Canal.

== Culture ==
=== People born in Babaarap ===
- Gurbanguly M. Berdimuhamedow, acting president of Turkmenistan in 2006 then president of Turkmenistan between 2007 and 2022.
- Wahyt S. Orazsähedow, footballer, born in 1992.
