= Ýuwangala =

Village in Turkmenistan

Ýuwangala Ýuwangala obasy
- Village
- Location in Turkmenistan
- Coordinates: 38°26′39″N 56°29′49″E
- Country: Turkmenistan
- Province: Balkan Province
- District: Magtymguly District
- Rural council: Gerkez geňeşligi

Population (2022 official census)
  - Total: 1,286
- Time zone: UTC+5

Ýuwangala is a village in Magtymguly District, Balkan Region, Turkmenistan. The village is sometimes called Gerkez because of the name of its rural council. It is located along both sides of Sumbar, about 20 km west of the city of Magtymguly. It is believed to be the birthplace of Magtymguly Pyragy. In 2022, it had a population of 1,286 people.

== Features ==
The most prominent attraction is the three-roomed Magtymguly Museum. (Note: In a 2004 visit, Paul Brummell noted the first room to display collections of Magtymguly's works, books about the poet, carpets woven in his memory, two conflicting family trees, and some utterly unrelated items. The second room was devoted to ethnography. Displayed were Turkmen silver jewelry —to emphasize Magtymguly’s skills as a jeweler— and an ornate teapot, with a dragon motif, that was allegedly gifted by Magtymguly to his sister. The third room offered a "jumbled mix of more ethnography and paintings of celebrated poets".)

At the eastern edge of the village, there is a bridge over Sumbar, constructed of metallic pipes. Crossing across leads to the Sheikh Ovezberdy Mausoleum, just beyond the last house of Gerkez. Dated to 15th century, its fired-brick structure —square base of about 9m. length, with a dome— stands amidst a meadow.

Although the birthplace of Magtymguly Pyragy is contested, the village regularly host festivities to commemorate his birth.

== Rural Council ==
The village is the seat of Gerkez Rural Council which includes five villages:

- Ýuwangala, village
- Arapata, village
- Arapjyk, village
- Magtymgala, village
- Uzyntokaý, village
