= Serhetabat =

City in Turkmenistan

Serhetabat Serhetabat şäheri
- City
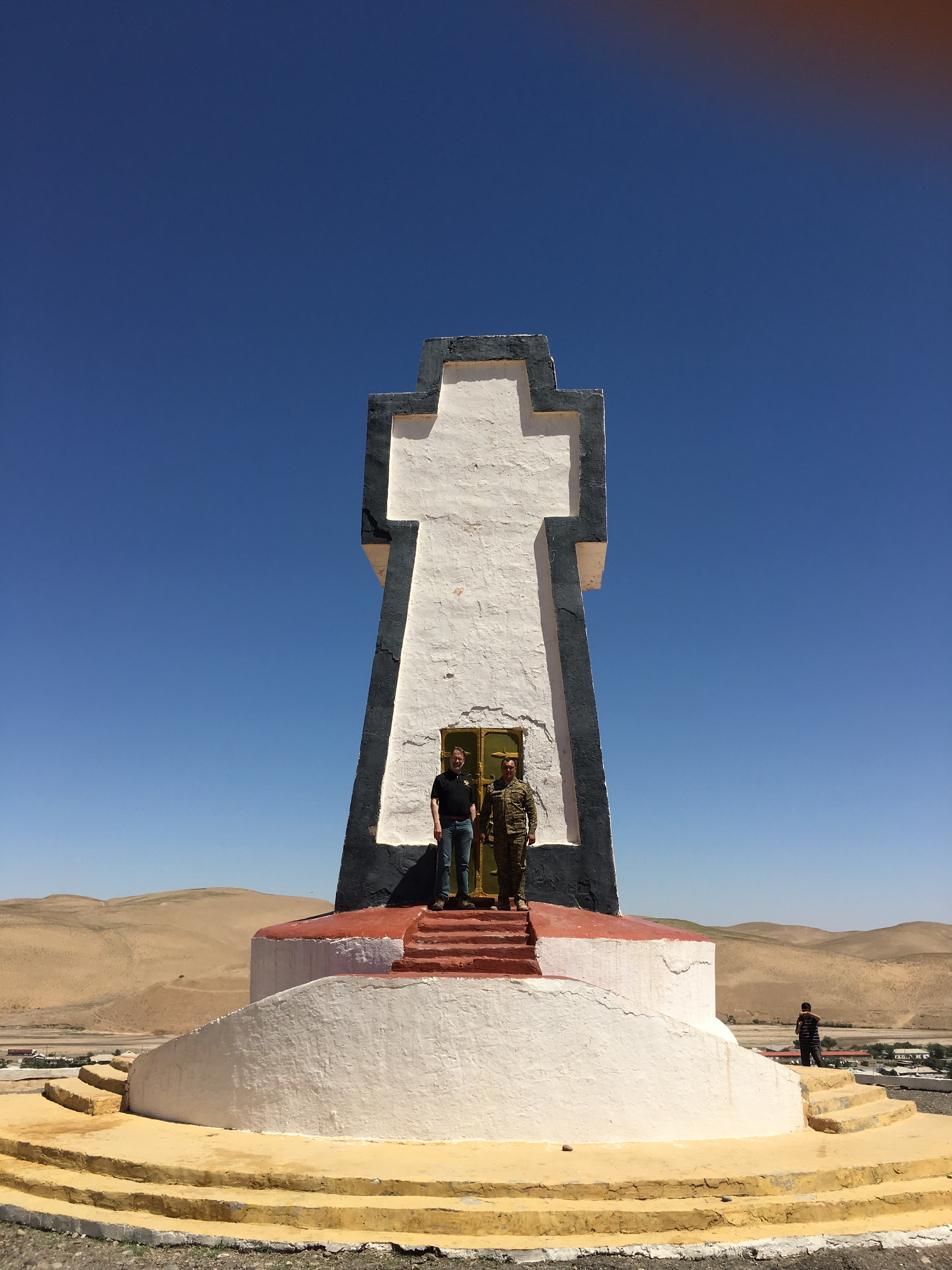
- Southern Cross of the Russian Empire in Serhetabat

- Location in Turkmenistan
- Coordinates: 35°16′31″N 62°19′28″E
- Country: Turkmenistan
- Province: Mary Province
- District: Tagtabazar District
- Elevation: 747 m (2,451 ft)

Population (2022 official census)
  - Total: 16,038
- Time zone: UTC+05:00 (TMT)

Serhetabat (Turkmen pronunciation: [seɾˌhetɑˈbɑːt]), formerly known as Guşgy or Kushka (Russian: Кушка), is a city in Tagtabazar District, Mary Province, Turkmenistan. Serhetabat lies in the valley of the Guşgy River, bordering Afghanistan. The city mirrors Torghundi, Afghanistan, with which it is connected by a road and a 1,520 mm (4 ft 11 27/32 in) gauge railway. In 2022, it had a population of 16,038 people.

== Etymology ==
The name of the city is a Turkmen borrowing from Persian سرحدآباد, consisting of two words: سرحد (sarhadd) meaning "border" and آباد (ābād) meaning "inhabited place" (commonly used as a Persian suffix for naming places, such as Khorramabad, a city in Iran, and Ashgabat, the capital of Turkmenistan). The name of the city corresponds to its geographic location on the Turkmenistan-Afghanistan border. A historical part of the Iranian city Karaj shares the same name, Sarhadabad.

Guşgy is a Turkmenized form of the Persian word kushk (کوشک), a term referring to mountain forts. In 1885 after taking the Panjdeh oasis Russian troops constructed a fort on the site of present-day Serhetabat and named it for the village of Kush in Afghanistan. Guşgy is also the name of the river flowing beside the city.

The Turkmenistan government changed the name to Serhetabat on 29 December 1999 by Parliamentary Resolution HM-67.

== Overview ==
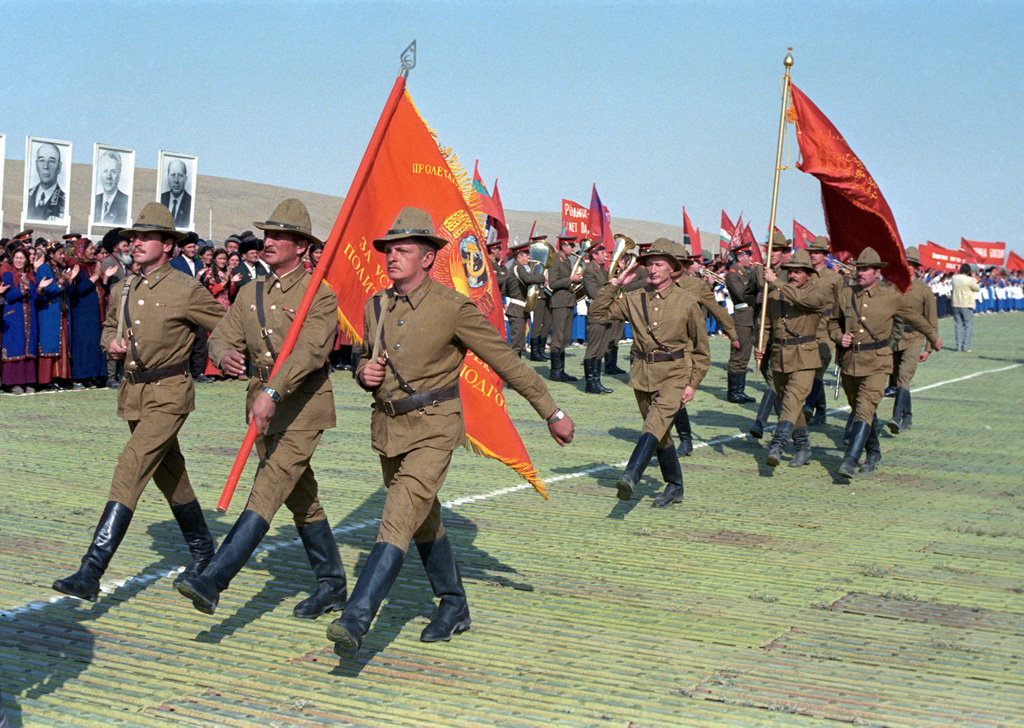
Soviet soldiers returning from Afghanistan. 20 October 1986, Kushka, Turkmen SSR

In 1885, Serhetabat and the surrounding region were seized from Afghanistan by Russian forces as a result of the Panjdeh incident (also referred to as the Battle of Kushka), in which about 600 Afghan soldiers were overwhelmed by over 2500 Russian troops.

The settlement was founded in 1890 as a Russian military outpost. A local rail-line branching from Merv (now Mary) on the Central Asian Railway was inaugurated on 1 March 1901, causing some degree of international excitement.

A point south of the city is the southernmost point of Turkmenistan and used to be the southernmost point of the Russian Empire and of the Soviet Union. A 10-metre stone cross, installed to commemorate the tercentenary of the House of Romanov in 1913, memorialises this fact.

== Transport ==
The broad gauge railway crosses into Afghanistan at the station, Torghundi being the railhead station on the other side. It was built in 1960. In February 2018, the existing rail line between Serhetabat and Torghundi was restored to service. This line is planned to be extended to Herat, where it could potentially connect to a rail line under construction from Khaf, Iran. Serhetabat is the southern end of Turkmenistan highway A-388, which connects the city to Ýolöten, Murgap, and Mary. The nearest airport is at Galaýmor.

== Climate ==
Serhetabat has a semi-arid climate (Köppen climate classification BSk), with cool winters and very hot summers. Rainfall is moderate in winter and spring, but summer is extremely dry.

Climate data for Serhetabat (1991-2020, extremes 1904-present)
Month	Jan	Feb	Mar	Apr	May	Jun	Jul	Aug	Sep	Oct	Nov	Dec	Year
Record high °C (°F)	27.1 (80.8)	31.0 (87.8)	37.6 (99.7)	40.2 (104.4)	42.3 (108.1)	47.6 (117.7)	45.3 (113.5)	43.5 (110.3)	43.4 (110.1)	38.8 (101.8)	34.2 (93.6)	31.5 (88.7)	47.6 (117.7)
Mean daily maximum °C (°F)	10.1 (50.2)	11.7 (53.1)	17.2 (63.0)	23.6 (74.5)	30.5 (86.9)	35.5 (95.9)	37.3 (99.1)	35.5 (95.9)	30.8 (87.4)	24.3 (75.7)	16.9 (62.4)	11.7 (53.1)	23.8 (74.8)
Daily mean °C (°F)	4.1 (39.4)	5.6 (42.1)	10.6 (51.1)	16.4 (61.5)	22.6 (72.7)	27.6 (81.7)	29.7 (85.5)	27.4 (81.3)	21.8 (71.2)	15.3 (59.5)	9.4 (48.9)	5.4 (41.7)	16.3 (61.4)
Mean daily minimum °C (°F)	−0.5 (31.1)	0.5 (32.9)	5.2 (41.4)	10.0 (50.0)	14.5 (58.1)	18.5 (65.3)	20.3 (68.5)	17.9 (64.2)	12.6 (54.7)	7.3 (45.1)	3.4 (38.1)	0.6 (33.1)	9.2 (48.5)
Record low °C (°F)	−33.8 (−28.8)	−27.7 (−17.9)	−19.6 (−3.3)	−5.5 (22.1)	−0.8 (30.6)	4.1 (39.4)	9.7 (49.5)	5.5 (41.9)	−3.7 (25.3)	−10.5 (13.1)	−19.0 (−2.2)	−27.1 (−16.8)	−33.8 (−28.8)
Average precipitation mm (inches)	48.1 (1.89)	58.5 (2.30)	68.0 (2.68)	40.2 (1.58)	12.9 (0.51)	0.7 (0.03)	0 (0)	0 (0)	0.3 (0.01)	4.7 (0.19)	25.7 (1.01)	37.6 (1.48)	296.7 (11.68)
Average extreme snow depth cm (inches)	2 (0.8)	1 (0.4)	0 (0)	0 (0)	0 (0)	0 (0)	0 (0)	0 (0)	0 (0)	0 (0)	0 (0)	1 (0.4)	2 (0.8)
Average rainy days	7	9	11	7	3	0.3	0.1	0.1	0.3	2	5	7	52
Average snowy days	5	6	2	0.3	0	0	0	0	0	0.1	1	3	17
Average relative humidity (%)	74	73	71	62	43	28	25	25	30	43	58	71	50
Mean monthly sunshine hours	126.5	128.5	166.6	230.2	320.9	360.3	388.7	366.5	319.2	263.0	163.9	137.9	2,972.1
Source 1: Pogoda.ru.net
Source 2: NOAA
