= Madaw =

Village in Balkan Province, Turkmenistan

Madaw Madaw obasy
- Village
- Location in Turkmenistan
- Coordinates: 38°08′23″N 54°44′38″E
- Country: Turkmenistan
- Province: Balkan Province
- District: Etrek District
- Rural Council: Madaw geňeşligi

Population (2022 official census)
  - Total: 5,052
- Time zone: UTC+5

Madaw, formerly known as Madau (in Russian: "Мадау") is a village in Etrek District, Balkan Province, Turkmenistan. As of 2022, its population was 5,052. It is the seat of the rural council of the same name, in which Madaw is the only village.

== See also ==
- List of municipalities in Balkan Province
