= Gyzylgaýa =

Gyzylgaýa Gyzylgaýa şäherçesi
- Town
- Location in Turkmenistan
- Coordinates: 40°37′19″N 55°27′56″E
- Country: Turkmenistan
- Province: Balkan Region
- District: Türkmenbaşy District

Population (2022 official census)
  - Total: 993
- Time zone: UTC+5

Gyzylgaýa, formerly known as Kizyl-Kaya (in Russian: "Кизыл-Кая") is a town in Türkmenbaşy District, Balkan Province, Turkmenistan. It should not be confused with Gyzylgaýa, Saýat District, Lebap Province. In 2022, Gyzylgaýa had a population of 993 people.

== Etymology ==
In Turkmen, Gyzylgaýa is a compound of the words "Gyzyl" and "Gaýa", meaning "Red" and "Crag" or "Cliff" respectively. The mention of red color in former soviet toponyms is common.

== Climate ==
Climate data for Chagyl weather station (WMO identifier: 38511), 115m amsl (21km northwest of Gyzylgaya), between 2005-2015
Month	Jan	Feb	Mar	Apr	May	Jun	Jul	Aug	Sep	Oct	Nov	Dec	Year
Mean daily maximum °C (°F)	4.3 (39.7)	5.6 (42.1)	15.3 (59.5)	21.6 (70.9)	30.0 (86.0)	36.3 (97.3)	38.2 (100.8)	36.7 (98.1)	30.6 (87.1)	20.8 (69.4)	11.5 (52.7)	5.9 (42.6)	21.4 (70.5)
Daily mean °C (°F)	0.2 (32.4)	1.1 (34.0)	9.2 (48.6)	15.5 (59.9)	23.1 (73.6)	28.7 (83.7)	31.0 (87.8)	28.8 (83.8)	22.8 (73.0)	14.4 (57.9)	6.1 (43.0)	1.7 (35.1)	15.2 (59.4)
Mean daily minimum °C (°F)	−3.8 (25.2)	−3.0 (26.6)	3.2 (37.8)	9.2 (48.6)	16.5 (61.7)	21.2 (70.2)	23.7 (74.7)	20.7 (69.3)	15.2 (59.4)	7.7 (45.9)	0.7 (33.3)	−2.3 (27.9)	9.1 (48.4)
Source: Infoclimat

== Transport ==
It is a stop on the North-South Transnational Corridor.

== See also ==
- Railway stations in Turkmenistan
