= Gyzylarbat =

City in Balkan Province, Turkmenistan

Gyzylarbat Gyzylarbat şäheri
- City
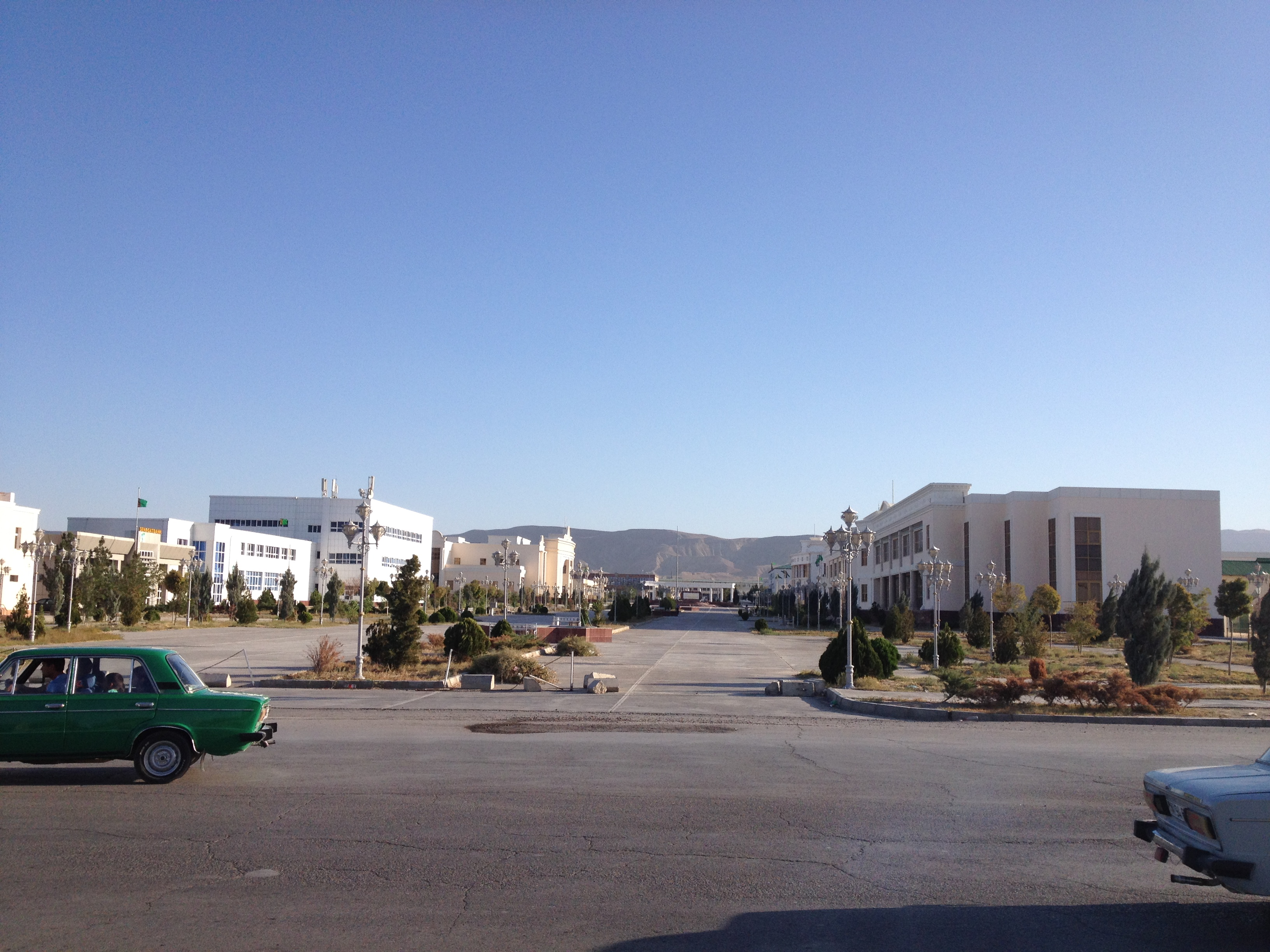
- Main square in Gyzylarbat

- Location in Turkmenistan
- Coordinates: 38°58′13″N 56°18′55″E
- Country: Turkmenistan
- Province: Balkan Province
- District: Gyzylarbat District
- Established: 18th century
- Elevation: 92 m (302 ft)

Population (2022 official census)
  - Total: 48,552
- Time zone: UTC+05:00 (TMT)
- Area code: +993 246

Gyzylarbat, formerly known as Kyzyl-Arvat (1881-1992), Serdar (1999-2022) or Farāva, is a city in Balkan Province, Turkmenistan, and the administrative center of Gyzylarbat District. The city is located northwest of Ashgabat, the capital of Turkmenistan, at the end of the line of oases on the northern slope of the Kopet Dag that extends to the southeast. It lies along the M37 highway going to the Caspian Sea. As of 2022, the population of Gyzylarbat was circa 50,000 people, mainly ethnic Turkmen. The main language spoken in the region is Turkmen.

== Name ==
=== Soviet Union-era and previous ===
The 8th-9th-century fortification in this place was called Kyzyl-Rabat, "red fortress". In the 16th-17th centuries this name was corrupted in the vernacular to Kyzyl-Arbat. In 1925, during Soviet rule, a district called Kizyl-Arvat (in Russian: "Кызыл-Арват") was established.

=== After independence ===
On 29 December 1999 the town was renamed from Kizyl-Arvat to Serdar. This is a loan word from Persian, meaning "leader" and is a reference to the first President of Turkmenistan, Saparmurat Niyazov. The town also shared a name with the third President of Turkmenistan, Serdar Berdimuhamedow, but had no relation. By decree of the Turkmen parliament on 9 November 2022, the old name, Gyzylarbat, was restored. The same decree downgraded Gyzylarbat from a city with district status to a city subordinate to a district, and renamed the district to Gyzylarbat, as well.

== Location ==
The city is located on the edge of the Karakum Desert at the foot of the Kopet-Dag ridge.

== History ==
=== Persian city of Farava ===
In ancient times, the region was inhabited by the Dahae, an Iranian people. Gyzylarbat is at the site of the old Persian city of Farāva (Parau; فراوه in Persian). Before the immigration of the Turkmens to these regions, Farava's population was Persian.

=== Turkic settlement ===
When the Oghuz, under the command of Tughril and Chaghri, lost a battle against Sultan Mahmud of Ghazni (r. 998–1030), they submitted to the sultan, requesting him to allow them to cross the waters of the Oxus and settle somewhere between Nisa and Abivard. Sultan Mahmud acceded to their request and allotted them the grazing grounds in the steppe near Sarahs, Abivard and Farava.

=== Russian and Soviet periods ===
During the Russian conquest, several exploratory expeditions reached here, but the main battle was at Geok Tepe (see Battle of Geok Tepe (1879) and Battle of Geok Tepe (1881)). The modern city was established in 1881 with a station on the Trans-Caspian Railway.

In July 1918, following his declaration of martial law in Ashgabat, Commissar V. Frolov, head of the Tashkent Cheka, came to Kyzyl-Arvat to impose the authority of the Tashkent Soviet. However the railway workers had heard of his execution of strike leaders in Ashgabat and organised an armed response. He was shot with some of his followers and the rest were disarmed. This action opened the way for the formation of the Transcaspian Government.

On 25 June 1957, the Soviet 58th Motor Rifle Division was established in Kyzyl-Arvat, from the 58th Rifle Division which had arrived years earlier.

=== After independence (1991) ===
During the rule of President Gurbanguly Berdimuhamedov (2007–2022), the city expanded to the northwest: a house of culture, a carpet factory, a secondary school, a kindergarten, an art school, a shopping center, a sports complex with a stadium, a swimming pool and playgrounds for various sports were erected. In addition, the infrastructure of the city was updated. In particular, a new railway and bus station, a flyover bridge, a collector for absorbing mudflows, sewage treatment plants, and a number of other engineering facilities were built here.

Private construction of the northern outskirts of the city is planned. Urban road infrastructure has been upgraded in recent years.

== Population ==
Historical population
Year	Pop.	±% p.a.
1970	22,000	—
1989	33,388	+2.22%
1999	51,000	+4.33%
2020	89,582	+2.72%

== Transportation ==
The rail station is on the Trans-Caspian railway. Construction began in 1879 of a narrow-gauge railway to Gyzylarbat in connection with the Russian conquest of Transcaspia under General Mikhail Skobelev.

Road transport includes two bus routes. Small PAZ buses serve the local population.

== Climate ==
Gyzylarbat has a cool desert climate (Köppen climate classification BWk), with cool winters and very hot summers. Rainfall is generally light and erratic, and occurs mainly in the winter and autumn months.

Climate data for Gyzylarbat (1991–2020, extremes 1883–present)
Month	Jan	Feb	Mar	Apr	May	Jun	Jul	Aug	Sep	Oct	Nov	Dec	Year
Record high °C (°F)	26.4 (79.5)	28.6 (83.5)	36.6 (97.9)	40.4 (104.7)	45.7 (114.3)	46.8 (116.2)	47.3 (117.1)	47.2 (117.0)	44.6 (112.3)	39.3 (102.7)	34.4 (93.9)	29.0 (84.2)	47.3 (117.1)
Mean daily maximum °C (°F)	7.3 (45.1)	9.6 (49.3)	16.2 (61.2)	23.5 (74.3)	30.7 (87.3)	36.3 (97.3)	38.7 (101.7)	37.7 (99.9)	31.9 (89.4)	23.6 (74.5)	14.1 (57.4)	8.1 (46.6)	23.1 (73.7)
Daily mean °C (°F)	2.8 (37.0)	4.6 (40.3)	10.4 (50.7)	17.1 (62.8)	24.1 (75.4)	29.6 (85.3)	32.0 (89.6)	30.7 (87.3)	24.7 (76.5)	16.8 (62.2)	8.9 (48.0)	4.0 (39.2)	17.1 (62.9)
Mean daily minimum °C (°F)	−0.8 (30.6)	0.5 (32.9)	5.5 (41.9)	11.5 (52.7)	17.9 (64.2)	23.0 (73.4)	25.7 (78.3)	23.9 (75.0)	18.0 (64.4)	10.8 (51.4)	4.5 (40.1)	0.6 (33.1)	11.8 (53.2)
Record low °C (°F)	−26.0 (−14.8)	−26.3 (−15.3)	−18.9 (−2.0)	−2.7 (27.1)	2.6 (36.7)	8.4 (47.1)	13.5 (56.3)	10.6 (51.1)	2.0 (35.6)	−2.9 (26.8)	−15.3 (4.5)	−22.1 (−7.8)	−26.3 (−15.3)
Average precipitation mm (inches)	22 (0.9)	28 (1.1)	33 (1.3)	24 (0.9)	18 (0.7)	5 (0.2)	5 (0.2)	8 (0.3)	3 (0.1)	13 (0.5)	22 (0.9)	21 (0.8)	202 (7.9)
Average precipitation days (≥ 0.1 mm)	8.9	8.9	6.7	8.2	4.8	1.5	1.3	0.8	1.7	3.6	6.5	9.8	62.7
Average relative humidity (%)	78.0	73.5	62.8	58.2	46.3	37.5	36.3	33.1	37.5	50.7	69.1	78.7	55.1
Mean monthly sunshine hours	118.7	137.1	181.1	226.0	294.6	344.7	352.2	342.8	296.5	236.1	174.1	110.3	2,814.2
Mean daily sunshine hours	3.8	4.9	5.8	7.5	9.5	11.5	11.4	11.1	9.9	7.6	5.8	3.6	7.7
Source 1: Pogoda.ru.net, climatebase.ru (precipitation days-humidity)
Source 2: NOAA (sun 1961–1990), Deutscher Wetterdienst (daily sun 1961-1990)
