= Bedirkent =

Village

Coordinates: 41°33′08″N 59°59′50″E

Bedirkent (formerly, Ataev) is a village in Görogly District, Turkmenistan.

== History ==
Bedirkent served as the headquarters of Junaid Khan, a Khivan ruler who tried to resist the Bolsheviks; he was unsuccessful and Bedirkent fell on the evening of 23 January 1920. It was renamed to Ataev in 1961 before being returned to its original name in 1999.

== Site ==
The ruins of a fortress, especially its mud-brick walls, are all that is prominent.

== Tourism ==
Considered to be a border village, foreigners need special permission for access.
