= Gökdepe, Gökdepe =

Gökdepe Gökdepe obasy
- Village
- Location in Turkmenistan
- Coordinates: 38°14′05″N 57°58′12″E
- Country: Turkmenistan
- Province: Ahal Province
- District: Gökdepe District
- Rural Council: Tagan Baýramdurdyýew adyndaky geňeşlik

Population (2022 official census)
  - Total: 9,150
- Time zone: UTC+5

Gökdepe, formerly known as Bolşewik (in Russian: Большевик) or 1-nji Gökdepe (Геок-Тепе 1-й), is a village in Gökdepe District, Ahal Province, Turkmenistan. It is located circa 10 km north of the city of Gökdepe and circa 50 km northwest from center Ashgabat. In 2022, it had a population of 9,150 people.

== Etymology ==
Gökdepe is a compound of two Turkmen words: "Gök," which means "Blue," and "Depe," which roughly translates to "Hill" or "Mound."

Its former name, "Bolşewik," refers the Bolsheviks, the faction of the RSDLP that established the Soviet Union. On the other hand, "1-nji Gökdepe" literally translates to "1st Gökdepe," in distinction to other settlements that were then named Gökdepe.

Gökdepe is included in the Rural Concil named after Tagan Baýramdurdyýew; he was a Sergeant of the Red Army who fought in WWII. He was awarded the title of Hero of the Soviet Union in 1945.

== Culture ==
=== People linked to Gökdepe ===
- Tagan Baýramdurdyýew (1909–1977), Hero of the Soviet Union born in Gökdepe.

== See also ==
- List of cities, towns and villages in Turkmenistan
- List of municipalities in Ahal Province
