= Magtymguly, Turkmenistan =

City in Balkan Province, Turkmenistan

Magtymguly Magtymguly şäheri
- City
- Location in Turkmenistan
- Coordinates: 38°26′N 56°18′E
- Country: Turkmenistan
- Province: Balkan Province
- District: Magtymguly District

Population (2022 official census)
  - City: 15,759
  - Urban: 15,386
  - Rural: 373
- Time zone: UTC+5

Magtymguly, formerly known as Garrygala (1924-2004), Kara-Kala (in Russian: Кара-Кала), Alexandrov, or Ganlygala, is a city in Balkan Province, Turkmenistan. It is the administrative center of Magtymguly District. In 2022, it had a population of 15,386 inhabitants. It is located in the foothills of the Kopet Dag mountain range, and it lies on the Sumbar River, a tributary of the Atrek River.

== History ==
The ruins of a vast fortress on the river bank are located in Magtymguly. The fortress was used as a base by the Armenian Kings Tigranes I to Tigranes VI.

== Etymology ==
Atanyyazow explains that Turkmen originally called the fortress, which he asserts was built here by Shah of Persia Mohammad, "Ganlygala" ("bloody fortress", from gan "blood" and gala "fortress") because of the amount of blood shed in fighting over it. At the end of the 19th century, under Russian influence the settlement was called Aleksandrov, but in the Soviet period it was renamed Garrygala in Turkmen (Russian: Кара Кала).

Following Turkmenistan's independence, on 4 June 2004, by Presidential Decree No. 4066, Garrygala city and district were renamed in honor of Magtymguly Pyragy.

== Attractions ==
The town is filled with monuments in memory of Magtymguly Pyragy; however, it is not prominent in the tourism circuit. West of the town lies the head office of Sünt-Hasardag Nature Reserve.

=== Plant Research Station ===
Set up in 1925 by Nikolai Vavilov as the southernmost station of the Institute of Plant Industry, a research station here was tasked with the trial introduction of a rubber plant collected from Mexico. Soon the Soviet Union shifted to synthetic rubber, and the station re-focused on indigenous flora and fauna. Visiting in 2004, Paul Brummell observed that the institute, which was under authority of the Turkmen Ministry of Agriculture, engaged in little scientific work and was mostly concerned with "selling saplings and fruit jam."

=== Shibly Baba Maousoleum ===
Several miles from the eastern outskirts of the town lies the tomb of Shibli Baba as part of a sacred complex. The mausoleum was lengthened and re-constructed in the Soviet era after locals dreamed of Baba being cramped. Shibli Baba, who hailed from Baghdad, is held to be the patron saint of the insane. Spending a night over his tomb supposedly cures one of all mental disorders. He is also associated with protection from thunder and fires; Paul Brummell observed linkages with a fertility cult. (Note: A phallus-shaped stone, with a hole in top, is present in the complex. Those who wish for a child pour yoghurt into the hole and spend the night next to it.) A twin-trunked tree on the periphery is revered, for it reportedly does not allow sinners to pass between its trunks.

== Dependencies ==
Magtymguly as a city has only a single dependent rural village:

Magtymguly, city:

- Gyzyl, village.
