= Bereket District =

District in Balkan Province, Turkmenistan

Bereket District Bereket etraby Gazanjyk District
- District
- Interactive map of Bereket District
- Coordinates: 39°14′35″N 55°31′01″E
- Country: Turkmenistan
- Region: Balkan Region
- Capital: Bereket

Area
  - Total: 8,540 sq mi (22,110 km^{2})

Population (2022 census)
  - Total: 39,282
  - Density: 4.602/sq mi (1.777/km^{2})
- Time zone: UTC+5 (+5)

Bereket District (Turkmen: Bereket etraby) (formerly Gazanjyk District) is a district of Balkan Region in Turkmenistan. The administrative center of the district is the city of Bereket.

== History ==
Founded in January 1925 as a district of Kazandjik Kazandzhiksky Poltoratsky District Turkmen SSR centered on Cazangic station.

- In August 1926 was abolished Poltoratsky County and Kazandzhiksky District passed under the direct supervision of the Turkmen SSR.
- In November 1939 Kazandzhiksky District went to the newly formed Krasnovodsk Oblast.
- In January 1947 Krasnovodsk Oblast was abolished and the area was transferred to the Ashgabat Oblast.
- In April 1952 Krasnovodsk Oblast has been restored and re-entered the Kazandzhiksky District in its composition.
- In December 1955 Krasnovodsk Oblast was again abolished and the area again became a part of the Ashkhabad Oblast.
- In May 1959, Ashgabat Oblast was abolished and the region was under the direct supervision of the Turkmen SSR.
- In December 1973 the district was transferred to rebuild Krasnovodsk Oblast.
- In 1988 Krasnovodsk Oblast again was abolished and the region was under the direct supervision of the Turkmen SSR.
- In 1991 Kazandzhiksky District became part of the Balkan Region was renamed in Gazandzhyksky Etrap first, and then in Bereket district.

== Administrative Subdivisions ==
- Cities (şäherler)
  - Bereket
- Towns (şäherçeler)
  - Galkynyş (inc. Gulmaç, Gamakly, Isgender, Ok, Öýleguşluk)
- Village councils (geňeşlikler)
  - Oboý (Oboý, Akjaguýma, Arkaç, Aýdyň, Çitli, Däneata)
  - S.A.Nyýazow adyndaky (Uzynsuw, Magtymguly, Türkmenistan, Uzynsuw bekedi)
  - Ýasga (Ýasga, Ajyguýy, Burgun, Düwünçi, Kiçijikýazy, Jemal, Garaýylgyn)

== Populated places in Bereket District ==
- Akjadepe - railway station, pop. 23.
- Akjaguýma, Turkmenistan - railway station, pop. 120.
- Däneata - railway station, pop. 100.
- Dövletýar - railway station, pop. 40.
- Bugdaýly - railway station, pop. 33.
- Balguýi - railway station, pop. 30.
- Ejeri - mineral springs, pop. 2–3.
- Iskender, Turkmenistan - railway station, pop. 255.
- Madaw - railway station, pop. 152.
- Oboý - railway station, pop. 725.
- Uzyn-suw - railway station, pop. 350.
- Arkaç - railway station, pop. 35.
- Aýdyn - railway station, pop. 35.
- Bala-Işem - railway station, pop. 730.
