= Serhetabat District =

Serhetabat District Şerhetabat Etraby
- District
- Interactive map of Serhetabat District
- Country: Turkmenistan
- Province: Mary Province
- Capital: Serhetabat
- Time zone: UTC+5 (+5)

Serhetabat District (formerly known as Guşgy District) is a district of Mary Province in Turkmenistan. The administrative center of the district is the town of Gushgy.

== History ==
Founded as the district of Kushkinsky in April 1930, it was abolished in June 1937. Kushkinsky only gets restored 40 years later, in July 1977, as part of the region of Mary. Its named was first Turkmenized in 1992 as Guşgy before having its current name as Serhetabat.
