= Etrek, Turkmenistan =

Etrek Etrek şäheri
- City
- Location in Turkmenistan
- Coordinates: 37°39′41″N 54°45′38″E
- Country: Turkmenistan
- Province: Balkan Province
- District: Etrek District
- Elevation: 29 m (95 ft)

Population (2022 official census)
  - Total: 12,508
- Time zone: UTC+5
- Area code: +993-242

Etrek, formerly known as Baýat-Hajy (in Russian: "Баят-Хаджи") until 1928, Kyzyl-Atrek ("Кизыл-Атрек"), then Gyzyletrek until 1999, is a city and the administrative center of Etrek District in Balkan Province, Turkmenistan. It is located on the Atrek River (Turkmen: Etrek derýasy) bordering on Iran. The city's and district's name was changed to Etrek in December 1999 by Parliamentary Resolution HM-63. In 2022, it had a population of 15,508 people.

== Etymology ==
Atanyyazow postulates that the name "Etrek" comes from the Turkic word atrau, which refers to the shore of a body of water. The name was first encountered in the 13th century, in the works of Hamdallah Qazvi. Atanyyazow further makes clear that the prefix gyzyl- was added during the Soviet period as a reference to the revolutionary color "red". This municipality was known as Baýat-Hajy until 1928. Atanyyazow nods to local elders who say the name honored an early resident who completed the pilgrimage to Mecca, but notes that a local tribe is also named Baýat.

== Overview ==
Nearby towns and villages include Agach-Arvat (4.8 km), Torshakli, Iran (6.3 km), Yasydepe (15.6 km), and Yarymtyk (19.4 km). There is no air service to Etrek, although there is an airport, Kizyl Atrek Airport, just to the south.

Etrek is the site of a barracks of the State Border Service of Turkmenistan, and is the location of a satellite office of the State Migration Service. The city and its district are included in the list of frontier areas of Turkmenistan subject to border service control.

== Climate ==
Etrek has a desert climate (Köppen climate classification BWk), with cool winters and hot summers. Rainfall is generally light and erratic, and is heavier in winter than in summer.

Climate data for Gyzyletrek
Month	Jan	Feb	Mar	Apr	May	Jun	Jul	Aug	Sep	Oct	Nov	Dec	Year
Mean daily maximum °C (°F)	11.2 (52.2)	12.9 (55.2)	16.8 (62.2)	23.4 (74.1)	29.6 (85.3)	33.9 (93.0)	35.6 (96.1)	35.2 (95.4)	32.0 (89.6)	25.6 (78.1)	19.4 (66.9)	14.0 (57.2)	24.1 (75.4)
Daily mean °C (°F)	5.4 (41.7)	6.5 (43.7)	10.2 (50.4)	16.2 (61.2)	21.9 (71.4)	26.2 (79.2)	28.5 (83.3)	28.3 (82.9)	24.8 (76.6)	18.0 (64.4)	12.3 (54.1)	7.7 (45.9)	17.2 (62.9)
Mean daily minimum °C (°F)	1.0 (33.8)	1.6 (34.9)	5.3 (41.5)	10.7 (51.3)	15.5 (59.9)	20.2 (68.4)	23.0 (73.4)	22.8 (73.0)	18.8 (65.8)	11.9 (53.4)	6.8 (44.2)	3.3 (37.9)	11.7 (53.1)
Average precipitation mm (inches)	23 (0.9)	21 (0.8)	33 (1.3)	21 (0.8)	18 (0.7)	3 (0.1)	4 (0.2)	5 (0.2)	8 (0.3)	14 (0.6)	21 (0.8)	23 (0.9)	194 (7.6)
Average precipitation days (≥ 0.1 mm)	7	6	7	5	4	1	1	1	2	4	5	6	49
Average relative humidity (%)	76	73	71	66	60	56	60	61	60	60	70	77	66
Source: NOAA (1961-1990)

== See also ==
- List of cities, towns and villages in Turkmenistan
