= Etrek District =

Coordinates: 37°39′42″N 54°45′31″E

Etrek Etraby is a district (estrap) in Balkan Province, Turkmenistan. It has an area of 13,850 km^{2} (5,350 sq mi) and an estimated population of 54,000 (2000). Its capital is Gyzyletrek. The former name of the district was Gyzyletrek District.

== Administrative Subdivisions ==
- Cities (şäherler)
  - Etrek
- Towns (şäherçeler)
  - N/A
- Village councils (geňeşlikler)
  - Akýaýla (Akýaýla, Çetli, Güdürolum)
  - Garaagaç (Garaagaç)
  - Gyzylbaýyr (Gyzylbaýyr)
  - Madaw (Madaw)
