= Tagtabazar District =

Tagtabazar District Tagtabazar etraby
- District
- Interactive map of Tagtabazar District
- Country: Turkmenistan
- Province: Mary Province
- Capital: Tagtabazar

Area
  - Total: 10,880 sq mi (28,190 km^{2})

Population (2022 census)
  - Total: 134,751
  - Density: 12.38/sq mi (4.780/km^{2})
- Time zone: UTC+5 (+5)

Tagtabazar District (Turkmen: Tagtabazar etraby) is a district of Mary Province in Turkmenistan. The administrative center of the district is the town of Tagtabazar.

The district is situated very close to the Afghanistan border.

== Administrative Subdivisions ==
- Cities (şäherler)
  - Serhetabat
- Towns (şäherçeler)
  - Tagtabazar
- Village councils (geňeşlikler)
  - Ahal (Ahal)
  - Çemenabat (Çemenabat)
  - Daşköpri (Daşköpri)
  - Erden (Erden, Dostluk)
  - Galaýmor (Galaýmor, Orazbaba)
  - Gulja (Gulja, Düldülahyr, Gyzyl Gojaly)
  - Marçak (Durdyýew adyndaky, Başbedeň, Gojaly)
  - Pendi (Suhty, Zähmetkeş)
  - Sandykgaçy (Sandykgaçy, Bagçylyk, 27-nji Oktýabr)
  - S.Nyýazow adyndaky (Baýraç)
  - Saryýazy (Saryýazy)
  - Söýünaly (Söýünaly, Bedeň)
  - Üzümçilik (Ýaşlyk, Üzümli)
  - Serhetçi (Serhetçi, Akrabat, Parahat)
  - Ýeňiş (Ýeňiş)
