= Time in Turkmenistan =

Time in Turkmenistan is given by Turkmenistan Time (TMT) (UTC+05:00) despite most of its territory putting it at the geographical time zone of UTC+04:00. Turkmenistan does not currently observe daylight saving time.
