= Gyzylarbat District =

Gyzylarbat District Gyzylarbat Etraby Serdar Etraby 1999-2022
- District
- Country: Turkmenistan
- Province: Balkan Province
- Capital: Gyzylarbat

Area
  - Total: 3,804 sq mi (9,852 km^{2})

Population (2022 census)
  - Total: 72,473
  - Density: 19.05/sq mi (7.356/km^{2})
- Time zone: UTC+5 (+5)

Gyzylarbat District (from 1999 until late 2022 Serdar District) is a district of Balkan Province in Turkmenistan. The administrative center of the district is the city of Gyzylarbat. It was the old Iranian district of Farava (Paraw). The name Gyzylarbat was restored by decree of the Turkmen parliament on 9 November 2022.

== Administrative Subdivisions ==
- Cities (şäherler)
  - Gyzylarbat (Formerly known as Serdar)
- Towns (şäherçeler)
  - Janahyr
- Village councils (geňeşlikler)
  - Arkaç (Garabogaz, Arkaç, Çerkezli, Melegoç, Ýylgynly, Tutly, Ýalkym)
  - Döwletmämmet Azady adyndaky (D.Azady adyndaky, Sarp, Hasar, Şatlyk, Ýaşlyk)
  - Goç (Goç, Goç bekedi, Parahat, Zaw, Zaw bekedi)
  - Hasar (Çukur, Bendesen, Jejirs)
  - Hojagala (Hojagala)
  - Paraw (Paraw, Janahyr bekedi)
  - Purnuwar (Purnuwar)
