= Magtymguly District =

Magtymguly District Magtýmguly Etraby
- District
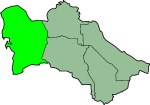
- Turkmenistan Balkan
- Country: Turkmenistan
- Region: Balkan Region
- Capital: Magtymguly

Area
  - Total: 4,136 km^{2} (1,597 sq mi)

Population (2022)
  - Total: 34,664
  - Density: 8.381/km^{2} (21.71/sq mi)
- Time zone: UTC+5 (+5)

Magtymguly District (formerly Garrygala District) is a district in the Balkan Region, southwestern Turkmenistan. Located in the southwestern Kopet Dag region, it encompasses the Sumbar River valley and includes the Sünt-Hasardag Nature Reserve. The administrative centre of the district is the city of Magtymguly, which was renamed along with the district in 2004 in honour of the 18th-century Turkmen poet and philosopher Magtymguly Pyragy. According to the 2022 Turkmenistan census, the district had a population of 34,664 inhabitants. It was named winner of the competition for most outstanding district in Turkmenistan for 2022.

== Name ==
The Magtymguly District was formerly known as the Garrygala District. On 4 June 2004, it was renamed Magtymguly by Saparmurat Niyazov, the President of Turkmenistan, in honour of the 18th-century Turkmen poet and philosopher Magtymguly Pyragy. Explained in Presidential Decree No. 4066, Niyazov outlined Magtymguly's association with the region, particularly the surroundings of Gerkez, and stated that the renaming was intended to perpetuate the poet's name. The administrative centre, Garrygala, was renamed Magtymguly at the same time.

== Geography ==
The Magtymguly District lies in the southwestern Kopet Dag region and includes the Sumbar River valley. The area is characterised by mountainous landscapes and the valley contains several historical monuments, including mausoleums and ruins of ancient ancient fortresses. The district also contains the Sünt-Hasardag Nature Reserve, which is on UNESCO's Tentative List of World Heritage Sites.

== Administration ==
The administrative center of the Magtymguly District is the city of Magtymguly, formerly named Garrygala. The district is divided into seven village councils (geňeşlikler): Çendir, Daghojagala, Daýna, Gerkez, Könekesir, Kürüždeý, and Ýankel.

== Demographics ==
Based on the 2022 Turkmenistan census, published by the State Committee for Statistics, Magtymguly had a population of 34,664 inhabitants. The area of the district is 4,136 square kilometres (1,597 sq mi), meaning a population density of 8.38 inhabitants per square kilometre. The district had slightly more males with 17,791 (51.3%), in comparison to 16,873 (48.7%) females and a slight majority to rural area inhabitants with 19,278 (55.6%) in comparison to 15,386 (44.4%) inhabitants living in urban areas.

== Awards and recognition ==
In February 2023, the Magtymguly District was named winner of the competition for most outstanding district in Turkmenistan for 2022, earning a prize of one million US dollars, awarded by President Serdar Berdimuhamedow at the Magtymguly Fragi District Museum. The competition evaluated districts on their socioeconomic and cultural performance, including agricultural production, construction, employment, social services and environmental conditions.
