= Demographics of Turkmenistan =

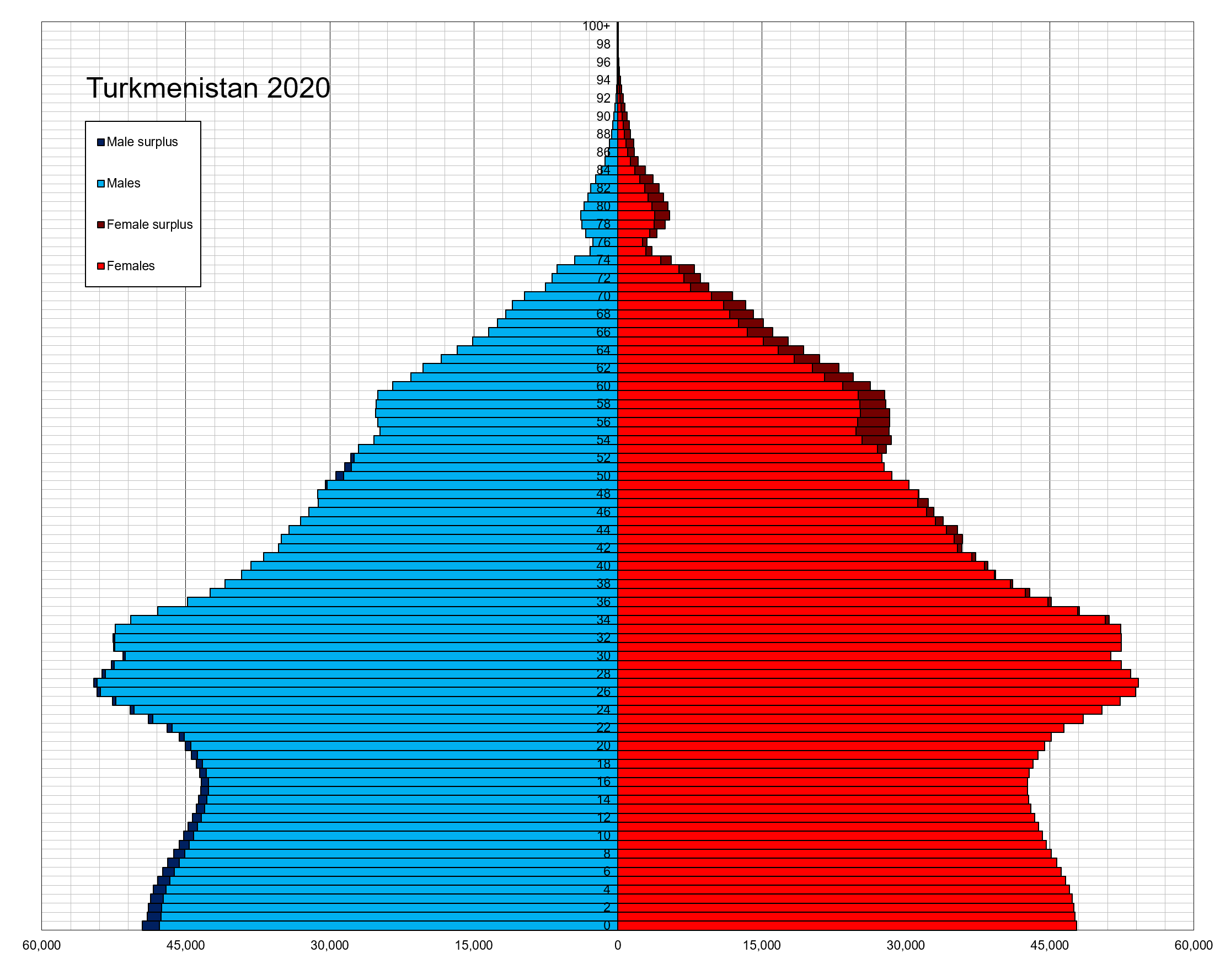
- Population pyramid of Turkmenistan in 2020
- Population: 7,057,841 (2022 est.)
- Growth rate: 0.99% (2022 est.)
- Birth rate: 17.51 births/1,000 population (2022 est.)
- Death rate: 5.95 deaths/1,000 population (2022 est.)
- Life expectancy: 71.83 years
  - male: 68.8 years
  - female: 75 years
- Fertility rate: 2.03 children born/woman (2022 est.)
- Infant mortality: 37.62 deaths/1,000 live births
- Net migration rate: -1.71 migrant(s)/1,000 population (2022 est.)

Age structure
- 0–14 years: 25.44%
- 65 and over: 5.38%

Sex ratio
- Total: 0.98 male(s)/female (2022 est.)
- At birth: 1.05 male(s)/female
- Under 15: 1.03 male(s)/female
- 65 and over: 0.59 male(s)/female

Nationality
- Nationality: Turkmenistani(s)

Language
- Official: Turkmen

The demographics of Turkmenistan is about the demographic features of the population of Turkmenistan, including population growth, population density, ethnicity, education level, health, economic status, religious affiliations, and other aspects of the population. The ethnic majority in Turkmenistan call themselves Turkmen.

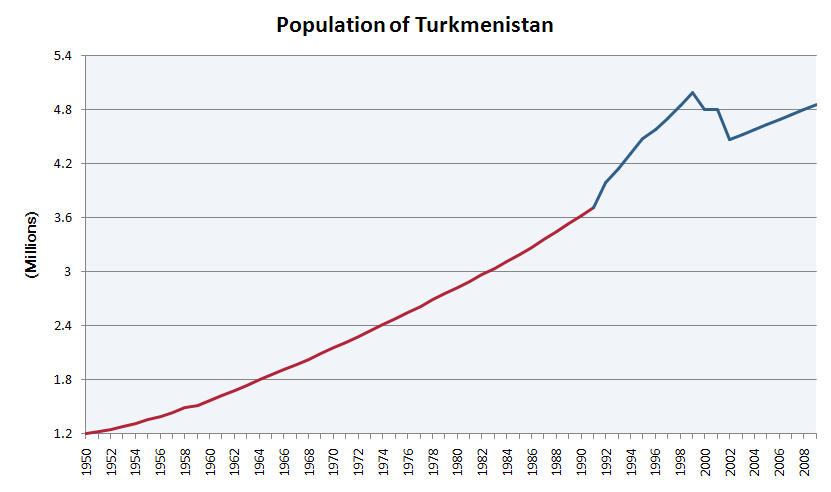
Population of Turkmenistan (in millions) from 1950 to 2009.

== Demographic trends ==
Census population and growth rate
Year	Pop.	±% p.a.
1926	1,000,914	—
1939	1,251,883	+1.74%
1959	1,516,375	+0.96%
1970	2,158,880	+3.26%
1979	2,764,848	+2.79%
1989	3,522,717	+2.45%
1995	4,434,354	+3.91%
2022	7,057,841	+1.74%

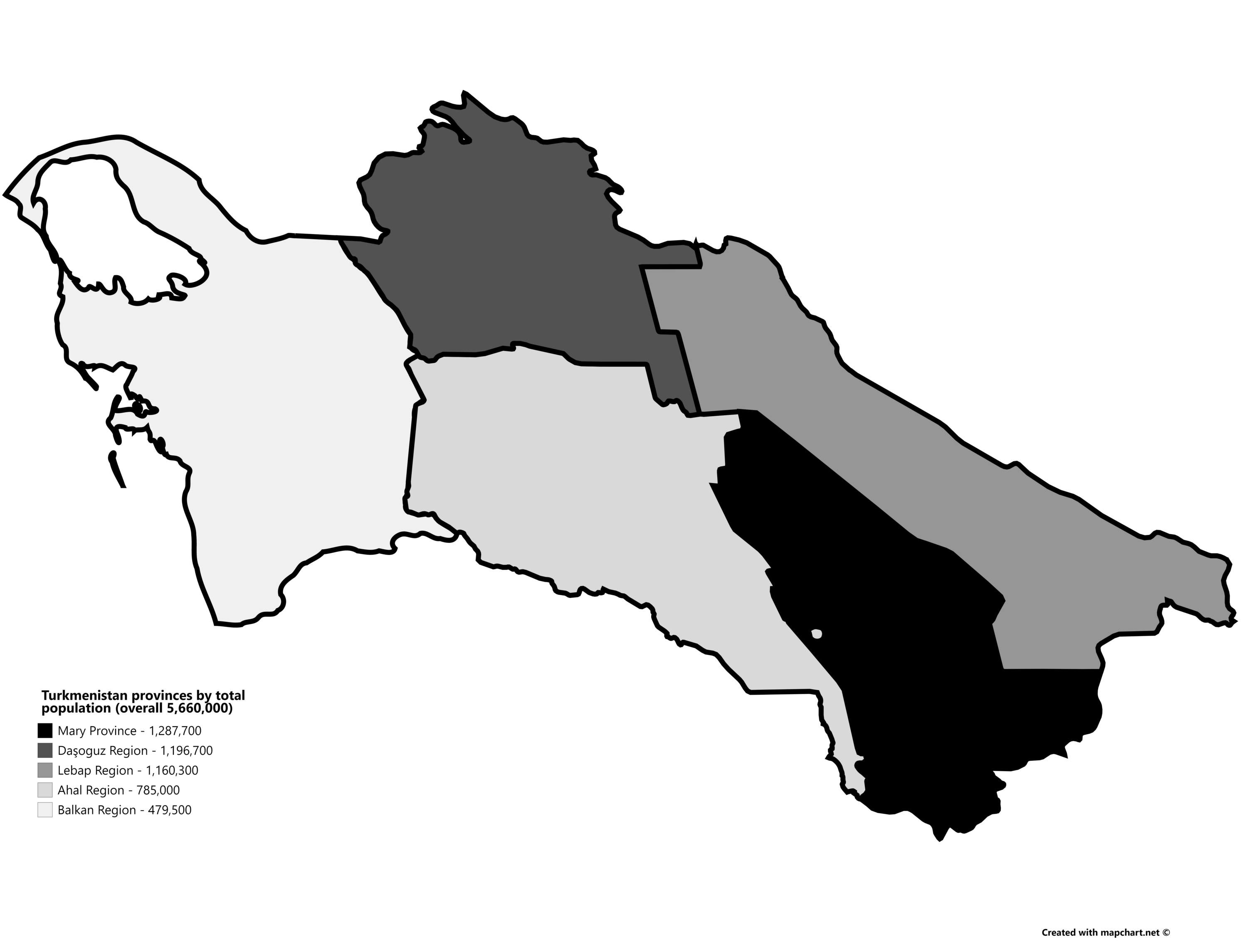
Turkmenistan population by region

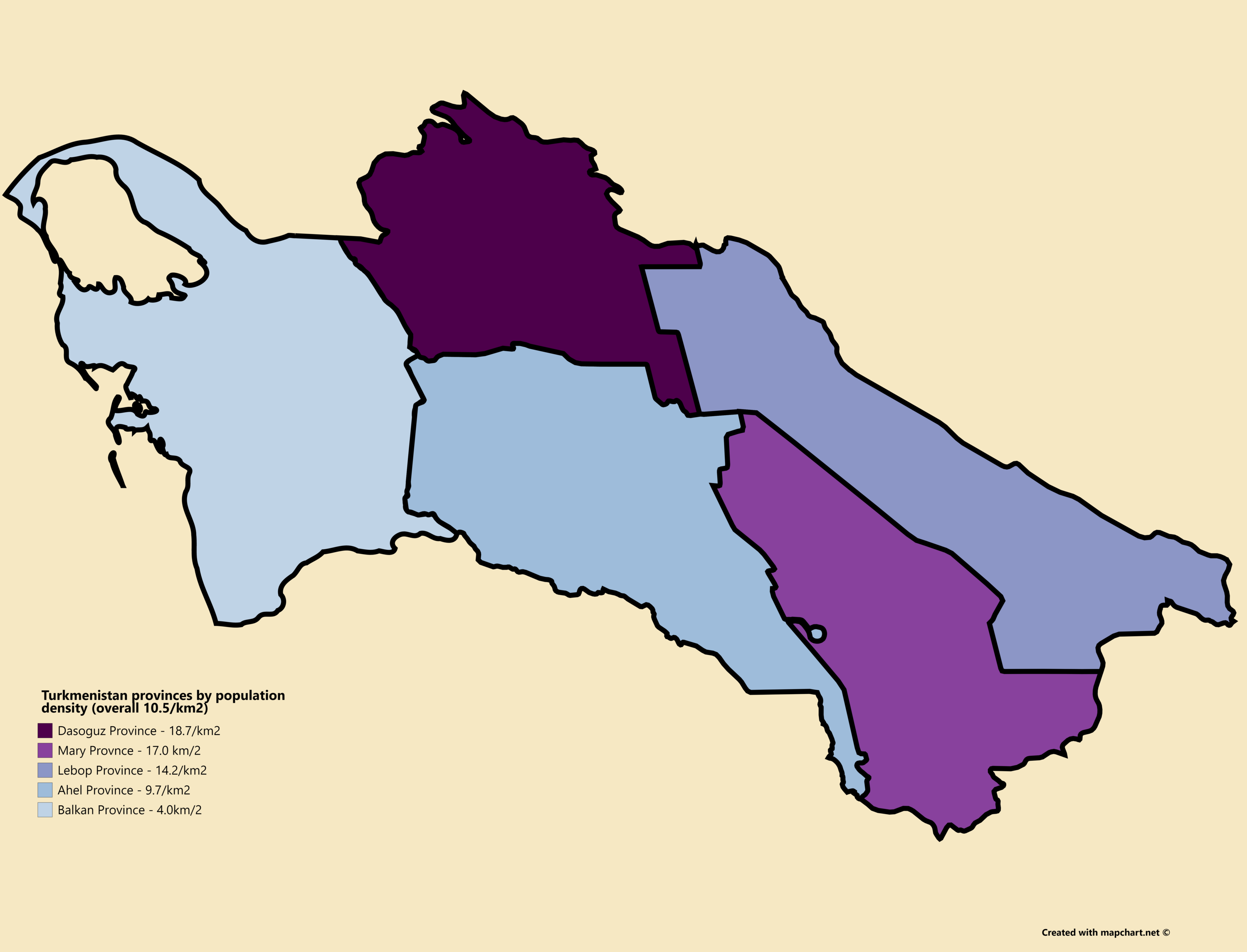
Population density of Turkmenistan by regions.

The 17 January 1939 census showed a population of 1,251,883, of which 741.5 thousand Turkmen, 232.9 thousand Russians, 107.4 thousand Uzbeks, 61.4 thousand Kazakhs, 19.5 thousand Tatars, 8,300 Iranians, 5,400 Baloch, and 75.5 thousand other nationalities. The population of Turkmenistan increased from 1.5 million in the 1959 census to 4.5 million in the 1995 census. The population continued growing to over 5 million in 2001–2006. According to opposition media, Turkmenistan's population in 2019 was no more than 3.3 million. As of July 2021, anonymous official sources informed opposition news media that the population of Turkmenistan had fallen to between 2.7 and 2.8 million.

According to some sources, deteriorating economic conditions have led to massive emigration of Turkmenistanis to other countries in search of work, possibly as many as 1,879,413 between 2008 and 2018, inclusive. Primary destinations are Russia, Turkey, and Ukraine. Between 2013 and 2019, the number of emigrants to Russia from Turkmenistan doubled. As one consequence, in 2018 Turkmen authorities began barring some citizens, particularly those younger than 40 years of age, from leaving the country in an apparent effort to stem emigration.

=== The 2022 census ===
A once-in-a-decade national census was conducted 17–27 December 2022. Opposition media reported that many people claimed not to have been interviewed by census workers, or that census workers merely telephoned respondents, and did not visit them to count residents. According to the results of the 2022 census, the results of which were published in July 2023, the population of Turkmenistan was 7,057,841. However, offshore media disputed that figure, with one source claiming it came out of "thin air". Official population estimates are likely too high, given known emigration trends.

== Vital statistics ==
=== UN estimates ===
Period	Live births per year	Deaths per year	Natural change per year	CBR^{1}	CDR^{1}	NC^{1}	TFR^{1}	IMR^{1}
1950–1955	55 000	21 000	35 000	43.2	16.2	27.0	6.00	150.0
1955–1960	64 000	23 000	41 000	43.3	15.5	27.8	6.02	140.1
1960–1965	78 000	24 000	53 000	44.6	13.9	30.7	6.75	130.3
1965–1970	77 000	24 000	54 000	38.0	11.7	26.3	6.34	120.4
1970–1975	87 000	24 000	63 000	37.1	10.3	26.8	6.19	110.6
1975–1980	95 000	26 000	69 000	35.3	9.6	25.8	5.32	100.7
1980–1985	107 000	27 000	81 000	35.2	8.7	26.5	4.79	90.9
1985–1990	123 000	28 000	95 000	35.7	8.2	27.4	4.55	81.0
1990–1995	128 000	34 000	94 000	32.9	8.6	24.3	4.03	75.5
1995				28.3	7.7	20.6	3.49	
1996				26.6	7.6	19.0	3.29	
1997				25.7	7.5	18.2	3.18	
1998				24.9	7.3	17.5	3.08	
1999				24.1	7.1	17.0	2.98	
2000				23.7	6.9	16.8	2.90	
2001				23.2	6.8	16.4	2.81	
2002				22.6	6.7	15.9	2.71	
2003				22.4	6.7	15.8	2.67	
2004				22.8	6.7	16.1	2.67	
2005				23.3	6.6	16.6	2.71	
2006				23.7	6.6	17.1	2.72	
2007				24.0	6.5	17.6	2.73	
2008				24.4	6.3	18.1	2.75	
2009				25.1	6.2	18.9	2.79	
2010				25.7	6.1	19.6	2.85	
2011				26.3	6.0	20.3	2.90	
2012				26.9	6.1	20.8	2.96	
2013				27.4	6.1	21.3	3.01	
2014				27.5	6.1	21.3	3.02	
2015				27.5	6.1	21.3	3.03	
2016				26.9	6.1	20.8	2.99	
2017				26.3	6.1	20.2	2.93	
2018				25.5	6.0	19.5	2.87	
2019				24.8	6.0	18.9	2.83	
2020				24.1	6.3	17.8	2.79	
2021				23.3	6.0	17.3	2.75	
2022				22.6	5.8	16.8	2.73	
2023				21.7	5.8	16.0	2.69	
2024				20.9	5.8	15.1	2.66	
2025				20.0	5.9	14.2	2.63	
^{1} CBR = crude birth rate (per 1000); CDR = crude death rate (per 1000); NC = natural change (per 1000); TFR = total fertility rate (number of children per woman); IMR = infant mortality rate per 1000 births

=== Registered births and deaths ===
Note that vital statistics were not published after 1994 by TurkmenStat.

	Average population	Live births	Deaths	Natural change	Crude birth rate (per 1000)	Crude death rate (per 1000)	Natural change (per 1000)
1950	1,211,000	46,335	12,411	33,924	38.3	10.2	28.0
1951	1,234,000	46,417	12,707	33,710	37.6	10.3	27.3
1952	1,260,000	49,306	14,775	34,531	39.1	11.7	27.4
1953	1,290,000	48,482	15,567	32,915	37.6	12.1	25.5
1954	1,321,000	51,162	14,650	36,512	38.7	11.1	27.6
1955	1,356,000	55,171	14,075	41,096	40.7	10.4	30.3
1956	1,390,000	53,528	11,783	41,745	38.5	8.5	30.0
1957	1,434,000	55,955	10,940	45,015	39.0	7.6	31.4
1958	1,487,000	59,235	10,987	48,248	39.8	7.4	32.4
1959	1,539,000	60,430	10,594	49,836	39.3	6.9	32.4
1960	1,593,000	67,676	10,433	57,243	42.5	6.5	35.9
1961	1,653,000	67,790	10,841	56,949	41.0	6.6	34.5
1962	1,713,000	68,725	11,772	56,953	40.1	6.9	33.2
1963	1,773,000	70,005	11,098	58,907	39.5	6.3	33.2
1964	1,833,000	69,777	11,623	58,154	38.1	6.3	31.8
1965	1,890,000	70,258	13,152	57,106	37.2	7.0	30.2
1966	1,943,000	73,109	13,036	60,073	37.6	6.7	30.9
1967	2,001,000	71,062	14,043	57,019	35.5	7.0	28.5
1968	2,061,000	73,470	14,223	59,247	35.6	6.9	28.7
1969	2,124,000	72,892	14,754	58,138	34.3	6.9	27.4
1970	2,188,000	77,080	14,370	62,710	35.2	6.6	28.6
1971	2,251,000	78,357	15,031	63,326	34.8	6.7	28.1
1972	2,315,000	78,841	16,680	62,161	34.0	7.2	26.8
1973	2,380,000	82,111	17,336	64,775	34.5	7.3	27.2
1974	2,449,000	84,607	17,766	66,841	34.5	7.2	27.3
1975	2,520,000	87,369	19,876	67,493	34.7	7.9	26.8
1976	2,588,000	90,765	20,040	70,725	35.1	7.7	27.4
1977	2,655,000	91,826	20,801	71,025	34.6	7.8	26.8
1978	2,724,000	93,798	21,847	71,951	34.4	8.0	26.4
1979	2,792,000	97,511	21,583	75,928	34.9	7.7	27.2
1980	2,861,000	98,069	23,863	74,206	34.3	8.3	25.9
1981	2,931,000	100,627	24,883	75,744	34.3	8.5	25.8
1982	3,003,000	104,340	23,984	80,356	34.7	8.0	26.8
1983	3,076,000	108,171	26,015	82,156	35.2	8.5	26.7
1984	3,151,000	111,083	25,760	85,323	35.3	8.2	27.1
1985	3,229,000	116,285	26,080	90,205	36.0	8.1	27.9
1986	3,310,000	122,337	27,865	94,472	37.0	8.4	28.5
1987	3,393,000	126,787	26,802	99,985	37.4	7.9	29.5
1988	3,479,000	125,887	27,317	98,570	36.2	7.9	28.3
1989	3,571,000	124,992	27,609	97,383	35.0	7.7	27.3
1990	3,668,000	125,343	25,755	99,588	34.2	7.0	27.2
1991	3,772,000	126,248	27,403	98,845	33.5	7.3	26.2
1992	3,883,000	131,034	27,509	103,525	33.7	7.1	26.7
1993	3,993,000	130,708	31,171	99,537	32.7	7.8	24.9
1994	4,096,000	129,700	32,067	97,633	31.7	7.8	23.8
1995		130,200					
1996		125,400					
1997		126,200					
1998		121,900					
1999		120,100					
2000		119,665					
2001		115,400					
2002		111,039					
2003		111,900					
2004		115,119					
2005		116,209					
2006		116,542					
2007		103,700					
2008		114,900					
2009		129,900					
2010		144,600					

=== Demographic and Health Surveys ===
Total Fertility Rate (TFR) (Wanted Fertility Rate) and Crude Birth Rate (CBR):

Life expectancy in Turkmenistan since 1950

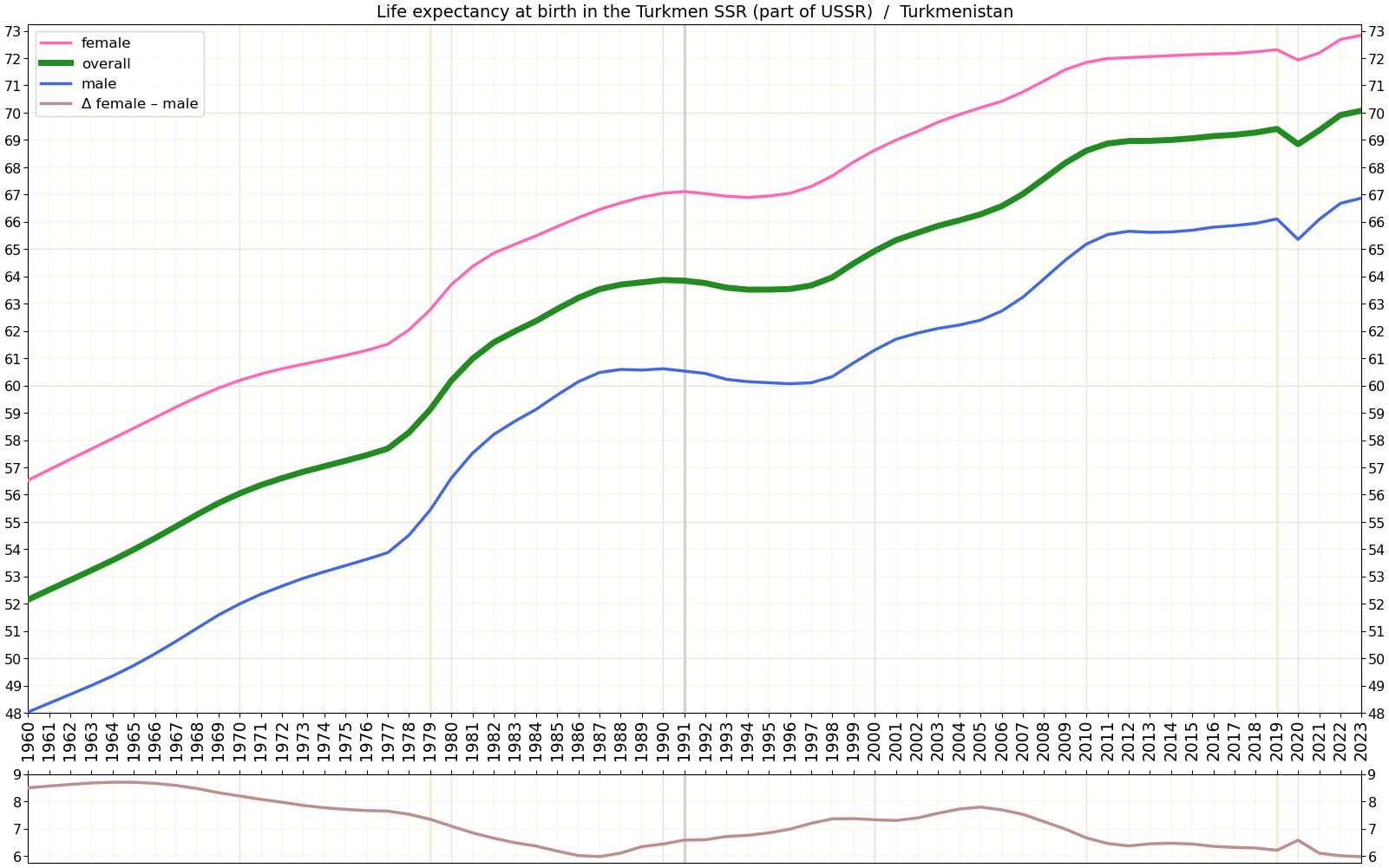
Life expectancy in Turkmenistan since 1960 by gender

Year	Total		Urban		Rural	
Year	CBR	TFR	CBR	TFR	CBR	TFR
2000	24.6	2.89 (2.66)	20.5	2.46 (2.29)	28.2	3.30 (3.00)
2015–16	28.0	3.2	25.0	3.0	30.0	3.3
2019	24.4	3.0	21.8	2.8	26.5	3.1
2024	20.0	2.8	19.0	2.6	22.0	3.0

Years	1925	1926	1927	1928	1929	1930	1931	1932	1933	1934
Total Fertility Rate in Turkmenistan	6.22	6.22	6.22	6.22	6.22	6.22	6.22	6.22	6.22	6.22

Years	1935	1936	1937	1938	1939	1940	1941	1942	1943	1944
Total Fertility Rate in Turkmenistan	6.22	6.22	6.22	6.22	6.22	6.22	6.22	6.22	6.22	6.22

Years	1945	1946	1947	1948	1949
Total Fertility Rate in Turkmenistan	6.22	6.22	6.22	6.22	6.22

=== Life expectancy ===
Period	Life expectancy in Years	Period	Life expectancy in Years
1950–1955	51.3	1985–1990	62.8
1955–1960	53.4	1990–1995	62.7
1960–1965	55.5	1995–2000	63.2
1965–1970	57.6	2000–2005	64.2
1970–1975	59.2	2005–2010	65.8
1975–1980	60.2	2010–2015	67.3
1980–1985	61.8		

Source: UN World Population Prospects

== Ethnic groups ==
The table shows the ethnic composition of Turkmenistan's population (in percent) between 1926 and 2022. There has been a sharp decline in the Slavic ethnic groups (Russians and Ukrainians) and also Kazakhs and Tatars since independence (as captured in the 1979 and 1995 censuses). Uzbeks are now the second largest ethnic group in Turkmenistan, with Russians relegated to the third place. According to data announced in Ashgabat in February 2001, 91% of the population are Turkmen, 3% are Uzbeks, and 2% are Russians. Between 1989 and 2001 the number of Turkmen in Turkmenistan doubled (from 2.5 to 4.9 million), while the number of Russians dropped by two-thirds (from 334,000 to slightly over 100,000).

Population of Turkmenistan according to ethnic group 1926–2022
Ethnic group	census 1926^{1}		census 1939^{2}		census 1959^{3}		census 1970^{4}		census 1979^{5}		census 1989^{6}		census 1995^{7}		census 2022^{8}	
Ethnic group	Number	%	Number	%	Number	%	Number	%	Number	%	Number	%	Number	%	Number	%
Turkmens	719,792	71.9	741,488	59.2	923,724	60.9	1,416,700	65.6	1,891,695	68.4	2,536,606	72.0	3,403,639	76.7	6,120,854	86.7
Uzbeks	104,971	10.5	107,451	8.6	125,231	8.3	179,498	8.3	233,730	8.5	317,333	9.0	408,259	9.2	642,476	9.1
Russians	75,357	7.5	232,924	18.6	262,701	17.3	313,079	14.5	349,170	12.6	333,892	9.5	297,319	6.7	114,447	1.6
Balochi	9,974	1.0	5,396	0.4	7,626	0.5	12,374	0.6	18,584	0.7	28,280	0.8	36,428	0.8	87,503	1.2
Azerbaijanis	4,229	0.4	7,442	0.6	12,868	0.8	16,775	0.8	23,548	0.9	33,365	0.9	36,586	0.8	26,576	0.4
Armenians	13,859	1.4	15,996	1.3	19,696	1.3	23,054	1.1	26,605	1.0	31,829	0.9	33,638	0.8	14,711	0.2
Kazakhs	9,471	0.9	61,397	4.9	69,522	4.6	68,519	3.2	79,539	2.9	87,802	2.5	88,752	2.0	11,825	0.2
Tatars	4,769	0.5	19,517	1.6	29,946	2.0	36,457	1.7	40,432	1.5	39,277	1.1	35,501	0.8	8,643	0.1
Ukrainians	6,877	0.7	21,778	1.7	20,955	1.4	35,398	1.6	37,118	1.3	35,578	1.0	23,064	0.5	2,566	0.0
Others	51,615	5.2	38,494	3.1	44,106	2.9	57,026	2.6	64,327	2.3	78,755	2.2	71,168	1.7	28,220	0.4
Total	1,000,914		1,251,883		1,516,375		2,158,880		2,764,848		3,522,717		4,434,354		7,057,841	
^{1} Source: . ^{2} Source:. ^{3} Source: . ^{4} Source: . ^{5} Source: . ^{6} Source: . ^{7} Source: ^{8} Source:

=== Azerbaijanis in Turkmenistan ===
The significant presence of Azerbaijanis in Turkmenistan dates from the early twentieth century. A massive influx of Azerbaijanis migrated to Turkmenistan due to the devastating 1902 Shamakhi earthquake.

Beyler of Shamakhi settled mainly in Krasnovodsk and Ashgabad (now known as Turkmenbashi and Ashgabat respectively). The Beyler's wealth spurred a big "investment boom" in Turkestan (Turkmenistan). Beyler began to build new buildings by using modernized technological equipment. In a short time, a large number of hotels, houses, teahouses, caravanserais, mosques, madrasas, schools, and theaters were built.

Azerbaijanis were also involved in the fight against the Bolsheviks. Azerbaijanis were found among the Basmachi fighters led by Enver Pasha, and some helped finance the movement. For decades, the fight against the colonial policy of Bolsheviks failed. Most of the members of Basmachi movement were killed in the battles of the independence of Turkestan, the other part were exiled to labor camps of Gulag.

During the 70 years of Soviet rule, Azerbaijani Bays and warriors were declared as a national enemy and their names were erased from history books. Today they have been rehabilitated.

At the period of the collapse of the USSR, 36,000 Azerbaijanis lived in Turkmenistan, now their population has reached over 52,000.

While living in Turkmenistan, Azerbaijanis have contributed to the culture and art of the country. Musical instruments such as Gaval, Nagara, Tar, Saz and Kamancheh have gained popularity in Turkmenistan, and Azerbaijani dishes like dovga, syabzi-frying, and sweet rice have become favorite dishes of Turkmenistanis. Today, the Azerbaijani community of Turkmenistan has its own mosques, musicians, and dancers.

Some famous Azerbaijanis from Turkmenistan are: the chief of Baku City Executive Power Hajibala Abutalibov, Elnur Huseynov who represented Azerbaijan twice in the Eurovision Song Contest and the winner of The Voice of Turkey, singer Natavan Habibi, a well-known geologist Shamil Azizbayov, film director Ajdar Ibrahimov, national heroes of Azerbaijan Fakhraddin Musayev and Tahir Bagirov, the first woman in the oil industry, and the Minister of Foreign Affairs from 1959 to 1983. Tahira Tahirova also was born in Turkmenistan.

== Religion ==
- Islam 95.8%
- Christianity 1.1%
- No religion 3.0%
- Other Religions 0.1% (2020 est.)

== See also ==
- Demography of Central Asia
- Religion in Turkmenistan
