= Subdivisions of Turkmenistan =

Turkmenistan is divided into four main levels of administrative subdivision, including provinces, districts, councils, and villages. The constitution states that Turkmenistan is divided into provinces, districts, and cities, among other subdivisions. Every single division in the country is set by law.

== First-level divisions ==
=== Welaýat ===
The first and highest administrative level in Turkmenistan is provinces, or "welaýat." They replaced former Soviet Union's oblasts. There are five of them: Ahal, Balkan, Daşoguz, Lebap, and Mary. Provinces are divided into districts.

Unlike any other division, they have a member of government, a deputy, assigned to their development. Provinces are headed by a governor, or "häkim."

Each of the provinces has its own representative assembly called the People's Council, "halk maslahaty," whose members are elected by universal suffrage.

=== City of Ashgabat ===
Ashgabat, the capital city of Turkmenistan, is a unique case of a city enjoying all the rights and powers of a province. It is divided into four boroughs: Bagtyýarlyk, Berkararlyk, Büzmeýin, and Köpetdag.

== Second-level divisions ==
=== Etrap ===
The second-level administrative divisions in Turkmenistan are districts, or "etrap." They replace what use to be called "raions" in post-Soviet states. Districts are further divided into cities, towns, and rural councils.

Districts are headed by a governor, or "häkim." Just like provinces, they have their own people's council, "halk maslahaty," whose members are elected by universal suffrage.

=== District-like cities ===
Some cities are designated by law as districts and enjoy the same rights as regular districts. Thus, they might include towns within their jurisdiction. As of 2026, there are 7 of them: Arkadag, Balkanabat, Daşoguz, Mary, and Türkmenabat, which are provincial capital cities, but also Baýramaly and Türkmenbaşy.

== Third-level divisions ==
=== Şäher ===
Cities, or "şäher," are the highest form of third-level subdivision in Turkmenistan. As of 2026, there are 51 of them, including district-like cities. Cities are designated by law using several criteria. They might include villages within their jurisdiction.

Just like upper administrative structures, they have their own representative body as well as an executive council, or "geňeş," enforcing laws. They're run by a mayor, "häkim," while their council is presided over by an "arçyn," literally "elder."

=== Şäherçe ===
Towns, or "şäherçe," basically enjoy the same rights as cities while usually being less populated. As of 2026, there are 71 of them. They are designated by law using the same criteria as cities. They might include villages within their jurisdiction.

=== Geňeşlik ===
Rural councils, or "geňeşlik," are a rural form of third-level division. Unlike cities and towns, which are urban forms of third-level divisions, their economy is primarily focused on agriculture. They're made up of one or more villages ruled by a local executive council, or "geňeş," which is presided over by an "arçyn." As a rural administrative division, it shall not include any urban-like settlement. Rural councils are defined by law.

== Fourth-level divisions ==
Villages, or "oba," are the lowest level of administrative division in Turkmenistan. They might be included within the jurisdiction of a city, a town, or a rural council. They are designated by law.

== See also ==
- Regions of Turkmenistan
- Districts of Turkmenistan
- Cities of Turkmenistan
- Towns of Turkmenistan
- Rural Councils of Turkmenistan
- List of cities, towns and villages in Turkmenistan
- ISO 3166-2:TM
