= Hojagürlük =

Hojagürlük Hojagürlük obasy
- Village
- Location in Turkmenistan
- Coordinates: 38.064193°N 65.69095°E
- Country: Turkmenistan
- Province: Lebap Province
- District: Döwletli District
- Rural council: Hojahaýran geňeşligi

Population (2022 official census)
  - Total: 2,283
- Time zone: UTC+5

Hojagürlük is a village in Döwletli District, Lebap Province, Turkmenistan. It is located nearly 10 km east of Döwletli, 60 km northeast of Hojambaz, and 20 km south of the Turkmenistan–Uzbekistan border. In 2022, it had a population of 2,283 people.

== Etymology ==
In Turkmen, Hojagürlük is a compound of two words: "Hoja," derivated from the persian word "خواجه," romanized: "Khwāja," which roughly translates as "Lord," or "Master," and "Gürlük," which roughly translates to "Luxuriance."

== History ==
On 9 November 2022, Döwletli District was abolished and Hojahaýran Rural Council was transferred to Hojambaz District. On 19 September 2025, Döwletli District was re-established and the rural council was transferred back.

== Rural Council ==
Hojagürlük is the most populated village within Hojahaýran Rural Council, which includes five villages:

- Hojahaýran, village
- Gyzguýy, village
- Hojagürlük, village
- Hojatutly, village
- Körkak, village

== See also ==
- List of cities, towns and villages in Turkmenistan
