= Agar, Turkmenistan =

Agar
- Location in Turkmenistan
- Coordinates: 37°40′N 65°24′E
- Country: Turkmenistan
- Province: Lebap Province
- District: Dänew District
- Rural Council: Baragyz geňeşligi

Agar is a village in Baragyz geňeşligi, Dänew District, Lebap Province in eastern Turkmenistan, near the border with Afghanistan.

Nearby towns and villages include Gyzylaýak (0.8 nm), Oba (0.8 nm), Krasnyy Turkmenistan (2.5 nm), Burguçy geňeşligi (4.0 nm), Kausy (4.0 nm), Daýhan (4.0 nm), Jeňellihatap (2.8 nm), Çagagüzer (4.3 nm).

== See also ==
- List of cities, towns and villages in Turkmenistan
- OpenStreetMap / Districts in Turkmenistan
