= Çagagüzer =

current name unknown Çagagüzer
- Location in Turkmenistan
- Coordinates: 37°38′37″N 65°29′5″E
- Country: Turkmenistan
- Province: Lebap Province
- District: Kerki District
- Rural Council: Burguçy geňeşligi
- Elevation: 245 m (804 ft)
- Time zone: UTC+5

Çagagüzer is the former name (before 1993) of a village in eastern Turkmenistan near the border with Afghanistan. It is located in Burguçy geňeşligi, Kerki District, Lebap Province.

Nearby towns and villages include Gyzylaýak (5.0 nm), Oba (5.0 nm), Agar (4.3 nm), Jyňňylhatap (1.7 nm), Hatap (4.8 nm), Mukry (1.6 nm), and Birleşik (1.9 nm).

The nearest airport is 16 miles away at Kerki.

== See also ==
- List of cities, towns and villages in Turkmenistan
- OpenStreetMap / Districts in Turkmenistan
