= Bagtly zamana =

Bagtly zamana Bagtly zamana obasy
- Village
- Location in Turkmenistan
- Coordinates: 37°26′17″N 59°30′32″E
- Country: Turkmenistan
- Province: Ahal Province
- District: Kaka District
- Rural Council: Gowşut geňeşligi
- Establishment: 8 September 2025
- Time zone: UTC+5

Bagtly zamana is a new village located in Ahal Province, Turkmenistan. The village is located circa 10 km northwest of Kaka and 8 km east of the border with Iran. It was lawfully established on 8 September 2025.

== Etymology ==
Bagtly zamana is a name made of two words: "Bagtly" is a variant of "Bagt," which means "Luck," "Success," or "Happiness," with the suffix "-ly," which is used to form adjectives. Together, it may translate as "[a place] of Happiness." "Zaman" translates as "Time." The whole name roughly refers to an "Era of Happiness."

== Overview ==
The village consists of 400 new houses arranged in rows, a secondary school for 640 students, a kindergarten for 320 children, a store, administrative buildings, and a health center.

== History ==
The settlement was built between 2022 and 2025, 1 km southeast of the village of Gowşut. On 8 September 2025, the village was established by law, named "Bagtly zamana," and the seat of the Gowşut Rural Council was moved there. State medias report that the inauguration ceremony was held in the presence of numerous officials.

While President Serdar Berdimuhamedow describes the construction of new settlements as an effort to improve "the socio-cultural level and well-being of rural residents," RFE/RL denounces other settlements of the same kind that were unveiled in the previous years, calling them a set of "Potemkin villages."

== Rural Council ==
Bagtly zamana is the seat of a rural council including three villages:

- Bagtly zamana, village
- Gowşut, village
- Gowşut bekedi, village

== See also ==
- List of municipalities in Ahal Province
