= Sakar, Turkmenistan =

Sakar Sakar şäheri
- City
- Location in Turkmenistan
- Coordinates: 38.92575°N 63.74952°E
- Country: Turkmenistan
- Province: Lebap Province
- District: Saýat District

Population (2022 official census)
  - Total: 12,769
- Time zone: UTC+5 (+5)

Sakar is a city in Saýat District, Lebap Province, Turkmenistan. It is located on the left bank of the Amu Darya River, circa 15 km southeast of Türkmenabat and 20 km northwest of Saýat. In 2022, it had a population of 12,769 people.

== Etymology ==
Sakar is the name of a minor Turkmen tribe. The meaning is obscure.

== History ==
The town was previously the center of Sakar District. Sakar was granted a city-status on 7 July 2016 by Parliamentary Resolution No. 425-V. On 25 November 2017, Sakar District was merged into Saýat District.

== See also ==
- Cities of Turkmenistan
- List of municipalities in Lebap Province
