= Derweze District =

Coordinates: 38°10′N 58°22′E

Derweze District (abolished) Derweze etraby (2013-2018) Ruhabat etraby (2001-2013)
- District
- Derweze etraby
- Interactive map of Derweze District (abolished)
- Country: Turkmenistan
- Province: Ahal Province
- Capital: G. Orazov obasy
- Established: 2013
- Time zone: UTC+5

Derweze District is a former district of Ahal Province in Turkmenistan. Before October 2001 it was known as Ashgabat District. In 2013 Ruhabat District was renamed Derweze District and part of it was annexed by the city of Ashgabat as the Ruhabat District of that city. Ruhabat District of Ashgabat was then abolished in 2018.

Derweze District of Ahal Province was subsequently abolished and its territory assigned to Gökdepe District. As of 2021 it was no longer listed among the districts of Ahal Province on the provincial government's official website.

== Attractions ==
Gurtly Bird Sanctuary is located some 5 km from the former town and seat of Ruhabat, now the site of the administrative center of Bagtyyarlyk District of Ashgabat.

== Economy ==
On October 22, 2008, a new textile factory was officially opened in the district, providing jobs for 550 people. The factory specializes in velvet and is designed to produce one million meters of printed and painted silk velvet per year. The factory was built by the Turkish company "5M Inşaat Tekstil Ithalat Sanayi Ticaret LTD Sti" but the framework for the factory was established as a result of intergovernmental agreements between Turkmenistan and the People's Republic of China. The total cost of the project was 28.75 million U.S. dollars. The equipment for the factory was supplied by the Chinese company "Jum Shui".
