= Chary Hojamuradov =

Lawyer and former Prosecutor General of Turkmenistan

Chary Hojamuradov (also, Chary Khojamuradov and Chary Hodzhamyradov; Turkmen: Çary Hojamyradow) is a lawyer and former Prosecutor General of Turkmenistan.

== Early life ==
Hojamuradov was born in Baherden District of the Ahal Region in 1962. He graduated from the Law Faculty of Turkmen State University in 1984.

== Career ==
Till 1990, Hojamuradov worked at the Ashgabat District Legal Cell. Following that, he was appointed as a judge and serviced at the courts of Büzmeýin and Kopetdag districts for two years. In 1992, he was appointed as a Judge of the Supreme Court. After a tenure of six years, he was removed and installed as the Deputy Chairman of the Ashgabat City Court; by 2002, he was the Chairman.

From 2002 to 2006, he served as the Chairman of the Dashoguz Provincial Court before being reinstated as Chair of the Ashgabat City Court for a one-year stint. On 14 July 2007, President Berdimuhamedow decreed his appointment as the Chairman of Supreme Court, after firing Ýagşygeldi Esenow. On 3 March 2008, Hojamuradov was appointed as the new Prosecutor General, with Muhammetguly Ogshukov being fired for abuse of power.

On 23 March 2010, Berdimuhamedow threatened to have him dismissed for shortcomings in personnel management. On 4 October 2011, Hojamuradov resigned of ill-health; Yaranmurad Yazmuradov replaced him.
