= Olamsurhy =

Olamsurhy Olamsurhy obasy
- Village
- Location in Turkmenistan
- Coordinates: 37.732207°N 65.393383°E
- Country: Turkmenistan
- Province: Lebap Province
- District: Köýtendag District
- Rural Council: Burguçy geňeşligi

Population (2022 official census)
  - Total: 4,571
- Time zone: UTC+5

Olamsurhy, formerly known as Kausy, is a village in Döwletli District, Lebap Province, Turkmenistan. It is located on the right bank of the Amu Darya River, less than 5 km east of Dostluk, circa 35 km southwest of Döwletli, and circa 30 km west of the Afghanistan-Turkmenistan border. In 2022, it had a population of 4,571 people.

== History ==
On 25 November 2017, Beýik Türkmenbaşy District was abolished and its territories, including Burguçy Rural Council, were transferred to Döwletli District.

On 9 November 2022, Döwletli District was abolished and its territories were divided between Hojambaz and Köýtendag Districts. Olamsurhy went under the administration of Köýtendag District. On 19 September 2025, Döwletli District was re-established and the territorial changes were reverted.

== Transportation ==
Olamsurhy is served by the Burguçy railroad station and is located a short distance from the P-37 highway connecting Kerki and Kelif.

== Rural Council ==
Olamsurhy is part of a rural council along with three other villages:

- Hatap, village
- Çanakçy, village
- Daýhan, village
- Olamsurhy, village

== See also ==
- List of cities, towns and villages in Turkmenistan
- List of municipalities in Lebap Province
