= Daýhan, Turkmenistan =

Daýhan Gyzyl Daýhan
- Location in Turkmenistan
- Coordinates: 37°43′37″N 65°26′8″E
- Country: Turkmenistan
- Province: Lebap Province

Daýhan (prior to 1993 Gyzyl Daýhan) is a village in Burguçy geňeşligi, Döwletli District, Lebap Province, in eastern Turkmenistan, near the border with Afghanistan.

== Etymology ==
The Turkmen word daýhan means "farmer, peasant" in Turkmen, and is borrowed from Persian دهقان (dehghan). The Turkic word kyzyl (gyzyl in Turkmen) means "red" and referred in the Soviet period to the color red, the color of revolution.

== See also ==
- List of cities, towns and villages in Turkmenistan
