= Gowşut =

Village in the Ahal Province of Turkmenistan

Gowşut Gowşut obasy
- Village
- Location in Turkmenistan
- Coordinates: 37°27′21″N 59°28′57″E
- Country: Turkmenistan
- Province: Ahal Province
- District: Kaka District
- Rural council: Gowşut geňeşligi

Population (2022 official census)
  - Total: 7,881
- Time zone: UTC+5

Gowşut, also known as Kaushut in Russian ("Каушут"), is a village in Kaka District, Ahal Province, Turkmenistan. It is about 25 kilometres (16 mi) west of Kaka, the district capital. In 2022, it had a population of 7,881 people.

== History ==
The site was surveyed between 1946 and 1967. It was one of the largest settlements in the Hellenistic era.

To the west of the village, lies a citadel of irregular plan. Known in Turkmen as Khusrau Kala, this is dated to post-Parthian times and probably served as the summer residence of Khosrow I. Besides the citadel, are the ruins of a walled settlement.

Between 2022 and 2025, a new settlement was built 1 km southeast of Gowşut. On September 8, 2025, the new village was established by law, named "Bagtly zamana," and the seat of Gowşut Rural Council was moved to the said village.

== Transport ==
There is an eponymous village and halt-station serving Gowşut.

== Rural Council ==
Gowşut was the seat of its own rural council until 2025. It was then replaced by Bagtly zamana, and now includes three villages:

- Bagtly zamana, village
- Gowşut, village
- Gowşut bekedi, village
