= Ruhabad District =

Ruhabat District (abolished)
- District
- Ruhabat etraby
- Country: Turkmenistan
- Province: Aşgabat
- Time zone: UTC+5 (+5)

Ruhabat District was a district of Ashgabat and at times of Ahal Province in Turkmenistan. It was abolished between 2013 and 2018, and its territory was divided between the city of Ashgabat, which expanded its borders between 2013 and 2018, and Gökdepe District. The former Ruhabat District mayor's office in Ashgabat is now used by the Bagtyýarlyk District mayor.

== See also ==
- Districts of Turkmenistan
