= Ruhabat =

- Location in Turkmenistan
- Coordinates: 37°59′26″N 58°19′31″E
- Country: Turkmenistan
- Province: Ashgabat City
- District: Bagtyýarlyk District
- Time zone: UTC+5 (+5)

Ruhabat was a town and capital of Ruhabat District in the Ahal Province of Turkmenistan. The village was known as Imeni Ovezberdy Kuliyeva until October 2001, when President Saparmurat Niyazov renamed it, in honor of Ruhnama. In 2013, it was merged into Ashgabat.

== Facilities ==
Niyazov had Ruhabat declared as the model Turkmen village of the ensuing "Golden Age". Thus, a small village with a railway yard became a town with cultural centers and shopping marts.
