= Burgun =

Burgun Burgun obasy
- Village
- Location in Turkmenistan
- Coordinates: 39°53′51″N 55°54′21″E
- Country: Turkmenistan
- Province: Balkan Province
- District: Bereket District
- Rural Council: Ýasga geňeşligi

Population (2022 official census)
  - Total: 676
- Time zone: UTC+5

Burgun is a village in Bereket District, Balkan Province, Turkmenistan, approximately 40 km northeast of Ýasga and circa 80 km northeast of Bereket. In 2022, Burgun had a population of 676 people.

== Overview ==
The village lies on the right bank of the Uzboý River. Starting in 2012, several train stations were built along the Jañaözen-Gorgan railway crossing Turkmenistan. Among them, one station bears the name Burgun, circa 11km northwest of the village.

== Rural Council ==
The village is included in a rural council (geňeşlik) which seats in the village of Ýasga.

- Ýasga, village
- Ajyguýy, village
- Burgun, village
- Düwünçi, village
- Garaýylgyn, village
- Jemal, village
- Kiçijikýazy, village

== See also ==
- List of cities, towns and villages in Turkmenistan
- List of municipalities in Balkan Province
