= Sayat =

Sayat could refer to:

== People ==
- Sayat Demissie (born 1986), Ethiopian singer and actress
- Sayat-Nova (1712-1795), Armenian poet

== Places ==
=== Azerbaijan ===
- Sayad, Azerbaijan, a municipality in Xaçmaz District, also spelled "Sayat"

=== France ===
- Sayat, Puy-de-Dôme, France, a commune in Auvergne-Rhône-Alpes

=== Turkmenistan ===
- Saýat, a city in Lebap Province
- Saýat District, a district in Lebap Province
- Saýat, Akdepe, a village in Daşoguz Province
