= Ýasga =

Ýasga Ýasga obasy
- Village
- Location in Turkmenistan
- Coordinates: 39°42′30″N 55°33′33″E
- Country: Turkmenistan
- Province: Balkan Province
- District: Bereket District
- Rural Council: Ýasga geňeşligi

Population (2022 official census)
  - Total: 1,460
- Time zone: UTC+5

Ýasga, formerly known as Yaskhan (in Russian: Ясхан), is a village in Bereket District, Balkan Province, Turkmenistan. It had a population of 1,460 people in 2022.

== Overview ==
The town lies on the left side of the Uzboý, roughly 50 km north of Bereket.

Starting in 2012, several train stations were built along the Jañaözen-Gorgan railway crossing Turkmenistan. Among them, one station bears the name Ýasga, circa 30km east of the village.

== Rural Council ==
The village is the seat of a rural council (geňeşlik) including seven villages:

- Ýasga, village
- Ajyguýy, village
- Burgun, village
- Düwünçi, village
- Garaýylgyn, village
- Jemal, village
- Kiçijikýazy, village

== See also ==
- List of municipalities in Balkan Province
