= Boýnyuzyn =

- Location in Turkmenistan
- Coordinates: 38°09′28″N 60°57′59″E
- Country: Turkmenistan
- Province: Lebap Province
- District: Garaşsyzlyk District

Boýnyuzyn (Russian: Боюн-Узун) is a town and capital of Garaşsyzlyk District in the Lebap Province of Turkmenistan.
