= Annasähet Annasähedow =

Turkmen footballer (born 1992)

Personal information
- Date of birth: 26 January 1992 (age 34)
- Place of birth: Ruhabat, Ahal Region, Turkmenistan
- Position: Defender

Team information
- Current team: FC Altyn Asyr

Senior career*
Years	Team	Apps	(Gls)
2014	FC HTTU	?	(?)
2015-2016	Ahal	?	(?)
2017–	Altyn Asyr		

International career^{‡}
2018–	Turkmenistan	1	(0)
- * Club domestic league appearances and goals as of 11 April 2019 ‡ National team caps and goals as of 1 April 2019

Annasahet Annasahedov (Turkmen: Annasähet Annasähedow; born 26 January 1992) is a Turkmen footballer who plays for Turkmen club FC Altyn Asyr. He was called up to the Turkmenistan national team in 2018.

== International career ==
He appeared with the Turkmenistan U21 national team at the 2013 Commonwealth of Independent States Cup.

Annasähedow made his senior national team appearance debut on 27 March 2018, in a 2019 AFC Asian Cup qualification – third round match against Bahrain.

== Honors ==
AFC President's Cup:

- Winner: 2014
