= Ajyguýy =

Ajyguýy Ajyguýy obasy
- Village
- Location in Turkmenistan
- Coordinates: 39°46′N 54°59′E
- Country: Turkmenistan
- Province: Balkan Province
- District: Bereket District
- Rural Council: Ýasga geňeşligi

Population (2022 official census)
  - Total: 536
- Time zone: UTC+5

Ajyguýy is a village in Bereket District, Balkan Province, Turkmenistan, approximately 50 km northeast of Balkanabat. In 2022, Ajyguýy had a population of 536 people.

== Rural Council ==
The village is included in a rural council (geňeşlik) which seats in the village of Ýasga.

- Ýasga, village
- Ajyguýy, village
- Burgun, village
- Düwünçi, village
- Garaýylgyn, village
- Jemal, village
- Kiçijikýazy, village

== See also ==
- List of municipalities in Balkan Province
