= Batash =

Batash Bataş
- Location in Turkmenistan
- Coordinates: 37°59′58″N 65°33′58″E
- Country: Turkmenistan
- Province: Lebap Province

Batash was a village in eastern Turkmenistan in Lebap Province. On 15 August 2009 it was subordinated to the Ýylangyz geňeş (village council) and made the administrative center of that council. Subsequently, on 7 July 2016, it was annexed by the neighboring town of Döwletli.

Nearby towns and villages include Amyderya (16.6 nm), Sardoba (9.5 nm), Khadzhykulluk (6.7 nm), Dzhity-Kuduk (8.0 nm), Kausy(8.5 nm) and Yulangyz (11.4 nm) . .

== See also ==
- List of cities, towns and villages in Turkmenistan
