= Omruzak Omarkuliev =

Omruzak Omarkuliev (born 1994) is a citizen of Turkmenistan and civic activist who was sentenced to 20 years "deprivation of liberty." Omarkuliev's current status is not known as he has been allowed no visitors and the Turkmen authorities will not release his location.

== Activism ==
Omarkuliev was a second year university student in Turkey when he founded a society of "compatriot students." The Turkmen Embassy in Turkey told Omarkuliev they were interested in supporting his organization, and invited Omarkuliev to return home and attend an event held by Turkmenistan's Central Election Commission.

Omarkuliev returned to Turkmenistan for the event, but when he tried to return to his university in February 2018, he found he was under a travel ban and could not board his flight.

== Arrest and Sentence ==
RFE/RL and the Turkmen Initiative for Human Rights reported that Omarkuliev was sentenced to 20 years in prison on unknown charges after a closed-door trial. RFE/RL reported in September 2018 that Omarkuliev appeared in a video, which the authorities claimed was evidence that Omarkuliev was serving his two-year military service and had not actually been arrested. The truth of this is suspect, and journalists have claimed that it is more likely he is being held in Ovadan-Depe prison. The conditions in this prison are notoriously inhumane.

== International Response ==
The international human rights organization Freedom Now and the law firm Hogan Lovells has filed a petition on behalf of Omarkuliev to the UN Working Group on Arbitrary Detention. In December 2021, Freedom Now also included his detention on a list of issues to be considered for Turkmenistan's periodic review for the UN Human Rights Council.

The U.S. Department of State mentioned Omarkuliev's case in its 2020 country report on human rights practices in Turkmenistan. In June 2020, a bipartisan group of senators wrote a letter to the president of Turkmenistan, President Gurbanguly Berdimuhamedow, requesting the release of political prisoners.

The European Union, the United Nations, and the Organization for Security and Cooperation in Europe (OSCE) have also been demanding to know his whereabouts.

Eleven United States Senators wrote a letter calling for his immediate release in June 2020.
