= ISO 3166-2:TM =

Entry for Turkmenistan in ISO 3166-2

ISO 3166-2:TM is the entry for Turkmenistan in ISO 3166-2, part of the ISO 3166 standard published by the International Organization for Standardization (ISO), which defines codes for the names of the principal subdivisions (e.g., provinces or states) of all countries coded in ISO 3166-1.

Currently for Turkmenistan, ISO 3166-2 codes are defined for five regions and one city. The city Ashgabat is the capital of the country and has special status equal to the regions.

Each code consists of two parts separated by a hyphen. The first part is TM, the ISO 3166-1 alpha-2 code of Turkmenistan. The second part is a letter.

== Current codes ==
Subdivision names are listed as in the ISO 3166-2 standard published by the ISO 3166 Maintenance Agency (ISO 3166/MA).

Click on the button in the header to sort each column.

Code	Subdivision name (tk)	Subdivision name (en) (Note: For reference only, English name not included in the ISO 3166-2 standard.)	Subdivision category
TM-A	Ahal	Ahal	region
TM-S	Aşgabat	Ashgabat	city
TM-B	Balkan	Balkan	region
TM-D	Daşoguz	Dashoguz	region
TM-L	Lebap	Lebap	region
TM-M	Mary	Mary	region

== Changes ==
The following changes to the entry have been announced in newsletters by the ISO 3166/MA since the first publication of ISO 3166-2 in 1998:

Newsletter	Date issued	Description of change in newsletter	Code/Subdivision change
Newsletter I-4	2002-12-10	One spelling correction. Correction of header information	
Newsletter II-2	2010-06-30	Update of the administrative structure and update of the list source	Subdivisions added: TM-S Aşgabat

== See also ==
- Subdivisions of Turkmenistan
- FIPS region codes of Turkmenistan
- Neighbouring countries: AF, IR, KZ, UZ
