= Babadaýhan =

Babadaýhan Babadaýhan şäheri
- City
- Location in Turkmenistan
- Coordinates: 37.689312°N 60.394052°E
- Country: Turkmenistan
- Province: Ahal Province
- District: Babadaýhan District

Population (2022 official census)
  - Total: 13,440
- Time zone: UTC+5

Babadaýhan, previously known as Kirovsk (in Russian: Кировск), is a city and capital of Babadaýhan District in Ahal Province, Turkmenistan. Its name and the name of the surrounding district were changed on 26 June 1992 by Parliamentary Resolution No. 729-XII. In 2022, it had a population of 13,440 people.

== Etymology ==
The name of the city is a compound of two Turkmen words: "Baba" and "Daýhan" (from Persian بابادهقان Bâbâdehqân/Bābā-Dihqān) which translates as "Grandfather" and "Peasant" respectively.

It was previously named after Sergei Kirov, revolutionary.
