= Batyr Atdayev =

Turkmen politician

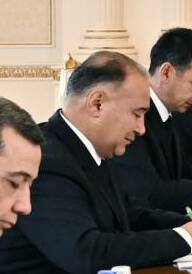
Atdayev during a meeting with Ilham Aliyev in Baku.

Batyr Atdayev (Turkmen: Batyr Taganowiç Atdaýew) is one of the Deputy Chairman of the Cabinet of Ministers responsible for trade, textile industry, and entrepreneurship. Immediately prior to this, he was Prosecutor General of Turkmenistan.

== Early life ==
Atdayev graduated from the Law Faculty of the Turkmen State University in the early 1990s.

== Career ==
In February 2016, Atdayev was appointed one of several Vice Presidents of Turkmenistan and tasked with overseeing commercial trade and foreign economic relations.

On 13 May 2017, he was appointed by President Berdimuhamedow as the new Prosecutor General, replacing Amanmyrat Hallyyev. (Note: Hallyyev was dismissed on 4 May, on grounds of bribery and mismanagement.) On 5 November 2021, Berdimuhamedow publicly reprimanded him for "improper performance of official duties and weakening of prosecutorial supervision over the activities of the oil and gas complex."

On 4 June 2022 he was reappointed to the Cabinet of Ministers as Deputy Chairman for Trade, Textile Industry, and Entrepreneurship, and simultaneously relieved of his duties as Prosecutor General. On 8 July 2022 he was also assigned responsibility for oversight of Ahal Province.
