= Bayrammurad Ashirliev =

Turkmenistani attorney

Bayrammurad Ashirliev is a lawyer and former Prosecutor General of Turkmenistan.

== Early life ==
Ashirliev was born in 1948 at a village of Ashgabat. He graduated in law from Turkmen State University in 1972.

== Career ==
For fourteen years after graduation (till 1986), Ashirliev served the Baýramaly District in different legal capacities eventually ending up as the state prosecutor. Then, he was appointed as the Prosecutor of Baýramaly city, where he continued for four years. In 1991, Ashirliev became the first Deputy Prosecutor of Ashgabat; the following year he was promoted to serve in the same capacity for the Ahal Region.

In 1993, he became the Prosecutor General of Turkmenistan. Ashirliev was removed from service on 2 April 1997 on grounds of inefficiency.
