= Dänew =

Dänew Dänew şäheri
- City
- Location in Turkmenistan
- Coordinates: 39.26162838799794°N 63.182762341011454°E
- Country: Turkmenistan
- Province: Lebap Province
- District: Dänew District

Population (2022 official census)
  - Total: 15,409
- Time zone: UTC+5

Dänew, briefly known as Galkynyş, is a city and capital of Dänew District in Lebap Province, Turkmenistan. The city is located on the left bank of Amu Darya River, circa 35 km southeast of Seýdi and 35 km northwest of Türkmenabat. In 2022, it had a population of 15,409.

== Etymology ==
The name Dänew is Persian or Tajik in origin, derived from deh ("village") and nov ("new"), meaning "new village".

The city was briefly renamed Galkynyş (2001-2017); In Turkmen, the word galkynyş roughly means "revival" or "renewal" and is sometimes translated as "renaissance" or "rebirth".

== History ==
Dänew received the status of urban-type settlement in 1935.

On 18 February 2001, the city was renamed Galkynyş. The name change was reversed on 25 November 2017.

== See also ==
- Cities of Turkmenistan
- List of municipalities in Lebap Province
