= Ministry of Justice (Turkmenistan) =

Government ministry of Turkmenistan

Ministry of Justice of Turkmenistan
- Türkmenistanyň adalat ministrligi
- Main building of Ministry of Justice

Agency overview
- Formed: 1991
- Jurisdiction: President of Turkmenistan
- Headquarters: Archabil Avenue 150, Ashgabat, Turkmenistan
- Minister responsible: Merettagan Taganov
- Child agency: Service for state registration of rights to real estate and transactions related to it
- Website: minjust.gov.tm

The Ministry of Justice of Turkmenistan (Turkmen: Türkmenistanyň adalat ministrligi) regulates the activities of the country's justice bodies. Since its inception in 1993 (two years after Turkmenistan declared independence from the Soviet Union), the ministry provides legal support to the state, and performs other tasks assigned by the Law of Turkmenistan to ensure the protection of the rights, freedoms and legitimate interests of the Turkmen citizen. It was originally established on 6 September 1972 as the Justice Ministry of the Turkmen SSR. In 2003, President Saparmurat Niyazov ordered the Ministry of Justice to be renamed as the Ministry of Adalat. With Adalat being the Turkic word for justice, the change in terminology was intended to convey fairness, honor, and order within the ministry's affairs. The Ministry of Justice was also given new responsibilities that included inventorying all state-owned and private properties and overseeing the lawyers, notaries, and civil-registration offices in Turkmenistan.

The Ministry of Justice publishes texts of some laws on its website.

== Structure ==
Central Apparatus:

- Main Department of Legislation
- Legal Aid Department
- Department of International Legal Relations and Registration of Public Associations
- Financial and Economic Department

Justice system:

- Regional offices
- Prosecutor General of Turkmenistan
- Supreme Court of Turkmenistan
- Central Registry Office Archive
- Courses on training specialists in international arbitration

The total number of units of the justice agencies of Turkmenistan is 156, including the 46 units of the Central Office of the Ministry of Justice.

== List of ministers ==
- Tagandurdy Halliev (1993–1999)
- Gurban Mukhammet Kasimov (1999–2003)
- Taganmyrat Gochyev (2003–2005)
- Asyrgeldi Gulgarayev (2005–2007)
- Myrat Garryyew (2008–2012)
- Begench Charyev Shadurdyevich (2012–2013)
- Begmyrat Muhammedov (2013–2021)
- Merettagan Taganov (2021–present)

== See also ==
- Justice ministry
- Politics of Turkmenistan
