= Babadaýhan District =

Babadaýhan District Kirov, (Cyrillic Киров) ????-1992
- District
- Babadaýhan etraby Cyrillic Бабадайхан этрабы
- Interactive map of Babadaýhan District
- Coordinates: 37°41′31″N 60°23′36″E
- Country: Turkmenistan
- Province: Ahal Province
- Capital: Babadaýhan

Government
  - häkim: Muhammetmyrat Amangeldiýewiç Garaýew

Area
  - Total: 14,400 km^{2} (5,600 sq mi)

Population (2022 census)
  - Total: 97,312
  - Density: 6.76/km^{2} (17.5/sq mi)
- Time zone: UTC+5

Babadaýhan District (Turkmen: Babadaýhan etraby, Бабадайхан этрабы) is a district of Ahal Province, Turkmenistan. From the Soviet period until 1992, the settlement was named in honor of Sergei Kirov. On 26 June 1992, by Parliamentary Resolution No. 729-XII, Kirov District and its capital were renamed Babadaýhan.

The name Babadaýhan is the Turkmenized form of the Persian name Bābā-Dihqān (بابادهقان), which eans “Forefather Farmer”, a mythological and ritual character whose cult has been reported in agrarian communities of mountainous and lowland Tajikistan, North Afghanistan and adjacent rural areas of Uzbekistan, Turkmenistan, and Kazakhstan. As an Iranian mythological figure, Bābā-ye Dehqān is believed to be the first man and the first farmer who taught his profession to mankind through a chain of his successors.

== Administrative Subdivisions ==
- Cities (şäherler)
  - Babadaýhan
- Towns (şäherçeler)
  - N/A
- Village councils (geňeşlikler)
  - Ak altyn (Ak altyn)
  - Akwekil (Akwekil, Çili)
  - Babadaýhan (Babadaýhan)
  - Garawekil (Garawekil, Garajaowlak)
  - Hasyl (Hasyl)
  - Täzeýol (Täzeýol, Götin)
  - Ýarygökje (Ýarygökje)
  - Zähmet (Zähmet, Alty Garlyýew adyndaky, Mamur)
