= Yaranmurad Yazmuradov =

Former Prosecutor General of Turkmenistan

Yaranmurad Yazmuradov (also, Yaranmurat Yazmuradov and Yaranmyrat Yazmyradov) is a lawyer and former Prosecutor General of Turkmenistan. He is currently serving an imprisonment for 30 years.

== Early life ==
Yazmuradov was born in 1971 at Büzmeýin. He graduated from Turkmen State University's Faculty of Law in 1996, and in the meanwhile—from 1992 to 1996—served as a secretary of the Supreme Court Presidium for Civil Judges.

== Career ==
Upon graduation, Yazmuradov was appointed as a Judge of a Military Court of the Ashgabat Military District. For the next ten years, he served in various roles ranging from an officer in the social services department to the head of local law enforcement to an officer in Ashgabat notary. In 2007, he was roped in as a judge of the Ashgabat City court.

Having served for hardly a year, he was appointed as the chairman/Chief Judge of the Ahal Provincial Court. Within months, on 3 March 2008, Yazmuradov was inducted by President Berdimuhamedow as the Chairman of Supreme Court. He replaced Chary Hojamuradov, who was appointed to be the new Prosecutor General at the same meeting. (Note: Incumbent Prosecutor General Muhammetguly Ogshukov was fired for failing to discharge his duties.) On 7 June 2011, Berdimuhamedow issued a public reprimand to Yazmuradov for "unsatisfactory performance of duties, [and] weakening of order and discipline in the subordinate courts."

On 4 October 2011, Yazmuradov replaced Hojamuradov as the Prosecutor General, after the latter resigned of ill-health. After a tenure of about two years, he was removed from office on 31 August 2013—officially on grounds of inefficiency, and unofficially for facilitating drugs trade—and sentenced to an imprisonment of 30 years. Amanmyrat Hallyev—who like Yazmuradov, was the incumbent Chairman of Supreme Court— was announced as his replacement.
