= Garaşsyzlyk District =

Garaşsyzlyk District (abolished) Boýnyuzyn District 1992-2001
- District
- Country: Turkmenistan
- Province: Lebap Province
- Capital: Boýnyuzyn
- Time zone: UTC+5 (+5)

Garaşsyzlyk District (renamed from Boýnyuzyn District on 18 February 2001 by Parliamentary Resolution HM-69) was a district of Lebap Province in Turkmenistan. The administrative center of the district was the town of Boýnyuzyn. The district was abolished and absorbed into Dänew District on 25 November 2017, by Parliamentary Resolution No. 679-V.

== Etymology ==
The word garaşsyzlyk means "independence" in the Turkmen language.
