= Sakar District =

Sakar District (abolished)
- District
- Interactive map of Sakar District (abolished)
- Country: Turkmenistan
- Province: Lebap Province
- Capital: Sakar, Turkmenistan
- Time zone: UTC+5

Sakar District is an abolished (former) district of Lebap Province in Turkmenistan. The administrative center of the district was the town of Sakar, Turkmenistan. Sakar was absorbed by Saýat District in November 2017.
