= Mahrijemal Mammedova =

Turkmenistani politician

- Mährijemal Mekandurdyýewna Mämmedowa

Deputy chairperson of the Turkmenistan government for culture and mass media
- Incumbent
- Assumed office 3 July 2020
- President: Gurbanguly Berdimuhamedow
- Preceded by: Bahargül Gurbanmyradowna Abdyýewa

Personal details
- Born: 1973 Sayat, Lebap Region, Turkmen SSR, USSR
- Education: Seyitnazar Seydi Turkmen State Pedagogical Institute
- Occupation: Politician

Mahrijemal Mammedova (Turkmen: Mährijemal Mekandurdyýewna Mämmedowa) is a Turkmen politician and educator currently serving as deputy chairperson of the Turkmenistan government for culture and mass media.

== Biography ==
Mammedova was born in 1973 in the village of Sayat in Lebap province of Turkmenistan. She was graduated in 1994 from the Seyitnazar Seydi Turkmen State Pedagogical Institute with a degree in education and psychology. She initially taught kindergarten in Sayat district of Lebap province. From 1997 to 1999, she was a school-psychologist at a high school in that district. From 2000 to 2004 she was a high-school teacher and psychologist in Ashgabat.

From 2004 to 2005, Mammedova was vice principal of Secondary School No. 16 and then of Secondary School No. 51 in Ashgabat. From May 2010 to April 2011, she was a Level I specialist for juvenile affairs in the Chandybil Borough of the city of Ashgabat. She was appointed deputy mayor for education, culture, health and sports of the Kopetdag Borough of Ashgabat from 2011 to 2014. In 2014, she was appointed deputy governor of Mary province for Education, Culture, Health, and Sports, a position she held until appointment to the Cabinet of Ministers on 3 July 2020.

== Disciplinary actions ==
- 29 July 2022, reprimand "for unsuitable execution of assigned responsibilities", concurrently with the firing of the head of the "Turkmenistan" television channel.
