= Hatap, Döwletli =

Hatap Hatap obasy
- Village
- Location in Turkmenistan
- Coordinates: 37.72372°N 65.48380°E
- Country: Turkmenistan
- Province: Lebap Province
- District: Köýtendag District
- Rural Council: Burguçy geňeşligi
- Elevation: 241 m (791 ft)

Population (2022 official census)
  - Total: 2,234
- Time zone: UTC+5

Hatap, or Hatab, is a village in Döwletli District, Lebap Province, Turkmenistan, near the border with Afghanistan. It is located on the right bank of the Amu Darya River, circa than 10 km east of Dostluk, 30 km south of Döwletli, and circa 30 km northwest of the Afghanistan-Turkmenistan border. In 2022, it had a population of 2,234 people.

== History ==
On 25 November 2017, Beýik Türkmenbaşy District was abolished and its territories, including Burguçy Rural Council, were transferred to Döwletli District.

On 9 November 2022, Döwletli District was abolished and its territories were divided between Hojambaz and Köýtendag Districts. Hatap went under the administration of Köýtendag District. On 19 September 2025, Döwletli District was re-established and the territorial changes were reverted.

== Rural Council ==
Hatap is the seat of a rural council along with three other villages:

- Hatap, village
- Çanakçy, village
- Daýhan, village
- Olamsurhy, village

== See also ==
- List of cities, towns and villages in Turkmenistan
- List of municipalities in Lebap Province
