= Hatap =

Hatap is a Turkic word that may refer to:

== Turkey ==
- Hatap Dam, a dam in Çorum Province, Turkey

== Turkmenistan ==
- Hatap, Döwletli, a village in Döwletli District, Lebap Province, Turkmenistan
- Hatap, Kerki, a village in Kerki District, Lebap Province, Turkmenistan
