= Murche =

Abandoned village in Turkmenistan

Murche is an abandoned village in the Ahal Region of Turkmenistan. The site is famed for the Mausoleum of Zengi Baba.

== History ==
Upon construction of the Karakum Canal to its north in the 1960s, inhabitants of Murche settled at a new site closer to the canal. Murche was left to ruins and crumbling mud-walls and doorways are all that survives.

Turkmen archaeologists have rebuilt a mud-tower and fireplace in traditional style — imparting feels of antiquity.

== Mausoleum of Zengi Baba ==
The most preeminent shrine of Zangi Baba, this mausoleum dates either from the 13th-14th centuries, when bricks taken from earlier establishments were put to reuse, or the 10th-11th centuries and then reconstructed a few centuries later.

It is a square building with an over-span dome — transition between walls and dome is marked with four niche-separated squinches. The cenotaph is tiled with different geometric patterns. Outside the mausoleum, a large collection of ovoid objects (prob. cannon balls; ascribed to be dinosaur eggs in local tradition) and stones of peculiar appearance (esp. ammolites) are preserved and imparted with sacred functions.
