= Saýat District =

Saýat District Saýat etraby
- District
- Interactive map of Saýat District
- Country: Turkmenistan
- Province: Lebap Province
- Capital: Saýat

Area
  - Total: 4,200 sq mi (10,890 km^{2})

Population (2022 census)
  - Total: 188,485
  - Density: 44.83/sq mi (17.31/km^{2})
- Time zone: UTC+5 (+5)

Saýat District is a district of Lebap Province in Turkmenistan. The administrative center of the district is the town of Saýat.

Found in January 1925 with the same name in Lenin Province (today Lebap), it became directly subordinate to the Turkmen SSR government following the abolishment of Chardzhuyskiy in September 1930.

In November 1939, it became part of the then newly formed Chardzhou Province before its province's dissolution in January 1963, twenty-four years later.

It rejoined Chardzhou again in December 1970, where it remains.

On 25 November 2017, Turkmen parliament dissolved Sakar District and added its territories to Saýat District.

== Administrative Subdivisions ==
- Cities (şäherler)
  - Garabekewül
  - Sakar
  - Saýat
- Towns (şäherçeler)
  - Çaltut
  - Suwçyoba
  - Yslam
- Village councils (geňeşlikler)
  - Akgala (Akgala, Gutnamgala, Hasyl, Kekreli, Şalyk)
  - Awçy (Awçy, Nerezim, Nurbak, Lebapoba)
  - Bakjaçy (Bakjaçylar)
  - Baý (Baý, Hojagundyz, Şaglar, Lebap)
  - Çekiç (Çekiçler, Azatlyk, Bagtyýarlyk)
  - Çowdur (Çowdur, Garagum, Saýatly, Watan)
  - Dostluk (Abdallar, Bataşjeňňel, Bozaryk)
  - Esgi (Gyzylgaýa, Esli, Ýagtyýol)
  - Ärsarybaba (Haryn, Aşgaly, Ögem)
  - Garamahmyt (Babadaýhan, Ak altyn)
  - Hojainebeg (Alpanoba, Täzeýol)
  - Jeňňel (Bereketli, Gulançy, Gutjuly, Raýdaşlyk, Ýaşlyk)
  - Lamma (Çakmak, Täzeoba)
  - Lebaby (Lebaby, Gawunçy, Guşçy, Kelteýap)
  - Merýe (Goşdepe, Alpan, Hazarekdepe)
  - Mülk (Mülk, Bitaraplyk, Bujak, Garkyn, Gyzan, Guşçulyk)
  - Rahmançäge (Rahmançäge, Garaşýer)
  - Seýdi (Seýdi, Akdepe, Bürgüt, Garaltaý, Saltyk, Şorly)
  - Soltanýazgala (Soltanýazgala)
  - Syýadagsakar (Syýadagsakar, Dostluk, Hasylçy)
  - Tejribeçiler (Tejribeçiler, Miweçiler, Gyzylýarymaý)
  - Täzelikçi (Täzelikçi)
  - Topurkak (Topurkak)
  - Ýeňiş (Ýeňiş)
  - [Gurbandurdy Zelili] Zelili adyndaky (Berkarar zaman, Gökdepe)
