= Prosecutor General of Turkmenistan =

Turkmenistani government office

- Incumbent; Batyr Atdaev since 12 May 2017
- Ministry of Justice
- Nominator: President of Turkmenistan
- Appointer: President of Turkmenistan with approval from the Assembly of Turkmenistan
- Term length: 5 years
- Inaugural holder: Bayrammurad Ashirliev
- Formation: Law on the Prosecutorate

The Prosecutor General of Turkmenistan (Turkmen: Türkmenistanyň Baş Prokurory), also referred to as the Attorney General, is the chief prosecutor and attorney of Turkmenistan. The incumbent takes part in all civil and criminal matters in which the government has an interest. The prosecutor general reports directly to the President of Turkmenistan and leads the Office of the Prosecutor General of Turkmenistan, which is part of the Ministry of Justice. The prosecutor general also sits on the State Security Council of Turkmenistan.

== Prosecutor General of Turkmenistan ==
- Bayrammurad Ashirliev (1993-3 April 1995)
- Gurbanbibi Atajanova (3 April 1995-10 April 2006)
- Muhammetguly Ogshukov (10 April 2006-3 March 2008)
- Chary Hojamuradov (3 March 2008-2011)
- Yaranmurad Yazmuradov (from October 2011-31August 2013)
- Amanmyrat Hallyyev (31 August 2013-12 May 2017)
- Batyr Atdayev (12 May 2017-2022)
- Serdar Mälikguliýew (5 July 2022-present)
