= Supreme Court of Turkmenistan =

Constitutional institution in Turkmenistan

The Supreme Court of Turkmenistan (Turkmen: Türkmenistanyň Ýokary kazyýeti) is a constitutional institution in Turkmenistan. It is one of three Turkmen institutions to exercise governmental power and is the highest ranking court in the country. Established in 1992 after the adoption of the Constitution of Turkmenistan, the Supreme Court currently consists of 22 judges who are appointed by the President of Turkmenistan for a 5-year term. It is the successor to the Supreme Court of the Turkmen SSR. The associate judges are divided into three different chambers, each specifically focusing on civil, criminal, and military law. The Supreme Court is affiliated to different regional munincipal, provincial courts, district and city courts, as well as the Supreme Economic Court.

The main tasks of the court include interpreting the Constitution and reviewing the constitutionality any decision made by the Assembly of Turkmenistan. The Supreme Court of Turkmenistan has the ability to review appeals against court and arbitral awards.

The court consists of the following divisions:

- Plenum
- Presidium
- Judicial board for civil cases
- Judicial board for arbitration cases
- Judicial board for administrative cases
- Judicial board for criminal cases

The Supreme Court is headquartered at 86 Ali-Shir Nava'i Street in the capital of Ashgabat.

== Chairmen of the Supreme Court ==
The Chairman of the Supreme Court of Turkmenistan is appointed by the President of Turkmenistan with the consent of the Mejilis for a term of five years. The chairman is a judge by profession and organizes and manages the work of all national courts.

Term start	Term end	Name
March 1991	4 August 1992	Halykberdy Ataev
10 August 1992	28 August 1996	Amanmurad Kakabayev
28 August 1996	6 January 1999	Ata Rahmanow
6 January 1999	12 November 2002	Öwezgeldi Ataýew
15 November 2002	13 June 2007	Ýagşygeldi Esenow
13 June 2007	3 March 2008	Chary Hojamuradov
3 March 2008	5 October 2011	Yaranmurad Yazmuradov
5 October 2011	31 August 2013	Amanmurad Hallyýew
31 August 2013	1 June 2017	Begench Charyev
1 June 2017	6 January 2021	Gylyçmyrat Hallyýew
6 January 2021	3 February 2023	Guwançmyrat Atamyradoviç Ussanepesow
3 February 2023	present	Begenç Hojamgulyýew
