= Gorjaw District =

Borough of City of Arkadag, Turkmenistan

Gorjaw District Gorjaw etraby
- District
- Interactive map of Gorjaw District
- Coordinates: 38°04′48″N 58°06′12″E
- Country: Turkmenistan
- Region: Arkadag

Government
  - häkim: Atajan Mylkyev
- Time zone: UTC+5 (+5)

Gorjaw District (Turkmen: Gorjaw etraby) is a borough of the city of Arkadag, Turkmenistan. The borough is headed by a presidentially appointed mayor (Turkmen: häkim).
