= Hojambaz =

Hojambaz Cyrillic Turkmen Хоҗамбаз
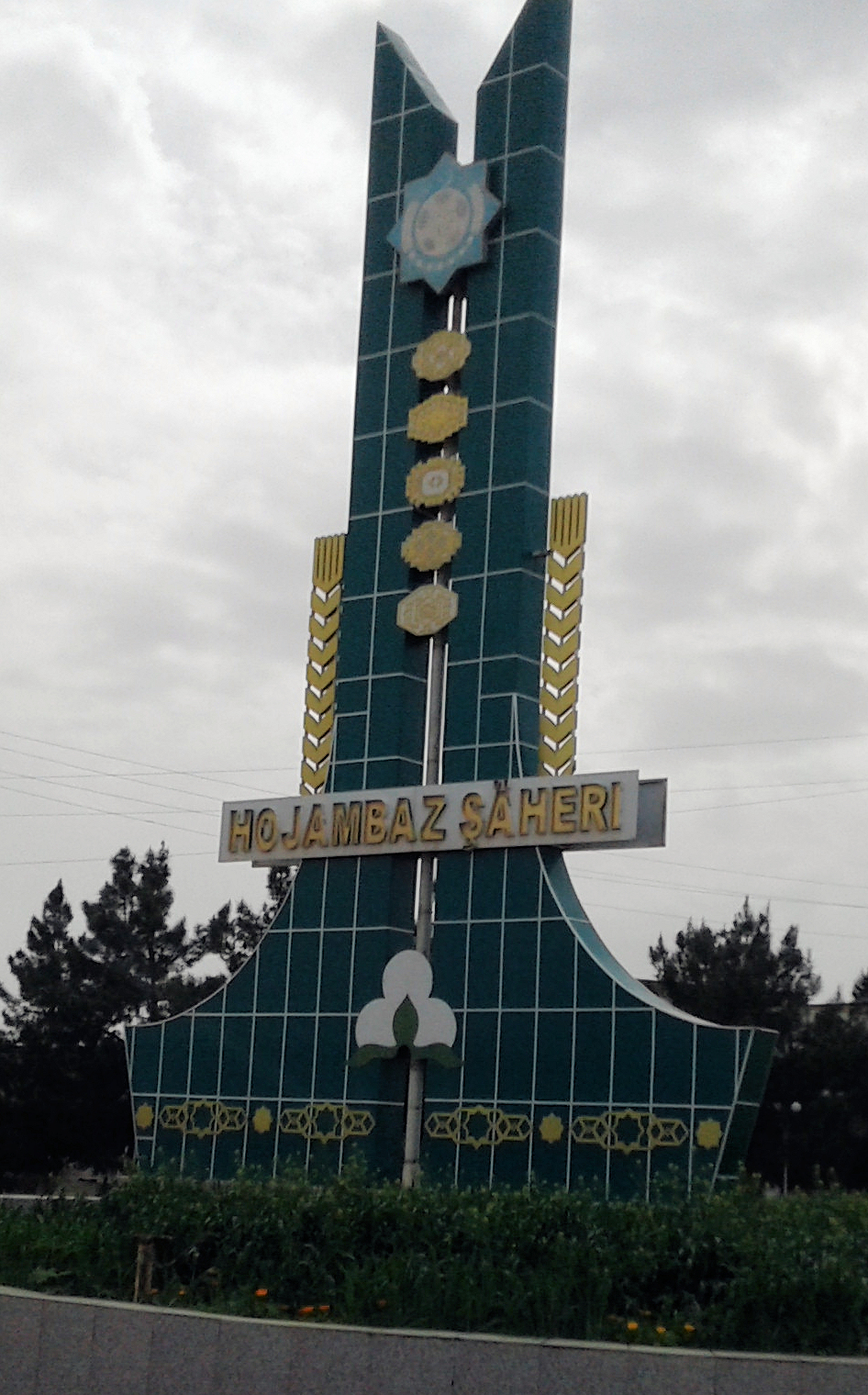
- Hojambaz city monument

- Location in Turkmenistan
- Coordinates: 38°07′N 65°00′E
- Country: Turkmenistan
- Province: Lebap Province
- District: Hojambaz District

Population (2010)
  - Total: 21,465
- Postal code: 745190

Hojambaz or Hodzhambas is a city and capital of Hojambaz District in Lebap Province, Turkmenistan.

== Etymology ==
The name of the city is derived from Persian word "Khâjeh-Jangbâz" ("خواجه‌جنگباز"), consisting of two parts, "Khâjeh" ("خواجه") being a commonly used honorific title, and "Jangbâz" ("جنگباز"), meaning "warrior". The name was adopted into Turkmen as "Hoja-Jeňbaz". The name then underwent phonetic modifications, such as a change in vowel in order to adhere to Vowel harmony rules of Turkmen, becoming "Hoja-Jaňbaz", and reduction of the two subsequent "ja" syllables into one, thus becoming "Hojaňbaz", ultimately evolving to its modern form "Hojambaz".

On 19th-century Russian maps of the area, the name was annotated as Cyrillic Ходжа-Джамбас (Hodzha-Dzhambas) and Ходжа-Джумбус (Khodja-Dzhumbus), and in the 1926 documents demarcating the Turkmen SSR as Ходжа-Джанбаз (Khodzha-Dzhanbas). Yakup Astanakulow TOP TKM

== Economy ==
The city's economy is dominated by employment at the China National Petroleum Company natural gas works in the Bagtyýarlyk gas field. The surrounding Hojambaz District produces cotton, which is ginned in the city.
