= Amanmyrat Hallyyev =

Turkmen lawyer and former Prosecutor General

Amanmyrat Hallyyev (Turkmen: Amanmyrat Hallyýew) is a lawyer and former Prosecutor General of Turkmenistan.

== Career ==
In July 2006, Hallyyev was appointed state prosecutor for Mary Province; earlier, he was a prosecutor for the Bereket District of Balkan Province.

On 31 August 2013, Hallyyev was appointed Prosecutor General by President Berdimuhamedow; he replaced Yaranmurad Yazmuradov, who was removed from office on grounds of inefficiency and facilitation of illicit drugs trade. After a tenure of about three years, on 4 May 2017, Hallyyev was removed for failing to prevent bribery in prosecutorial services, and Batyr Atdayev was appointed to succeed him.

As of February 2017, Hallyyev was referred to in the Turkmen official press as holding the rank of state counselor of justice, third class (Turkmen: ýustisiýanyň 3-nji derejeli döwlet geňeşçisi).

On 12 May 2017, Hallyyev was detained along with other employees.
