= Avaza District =

- Country: Turkmenistan
- Region: Balkan
- Time zone: UTC+5

Avaza District is a city borough of Türkmenbaşy in Balkan Region in Turkmenistan, on the Krasnovodsk Gulf of the Caspian Sea.
