= Berkararlyk District =

District in Ashgabat, Turkmenistan

Berkararlyk District Berkararlyk etraby Azatlyk District, Sovetskiy District
- District
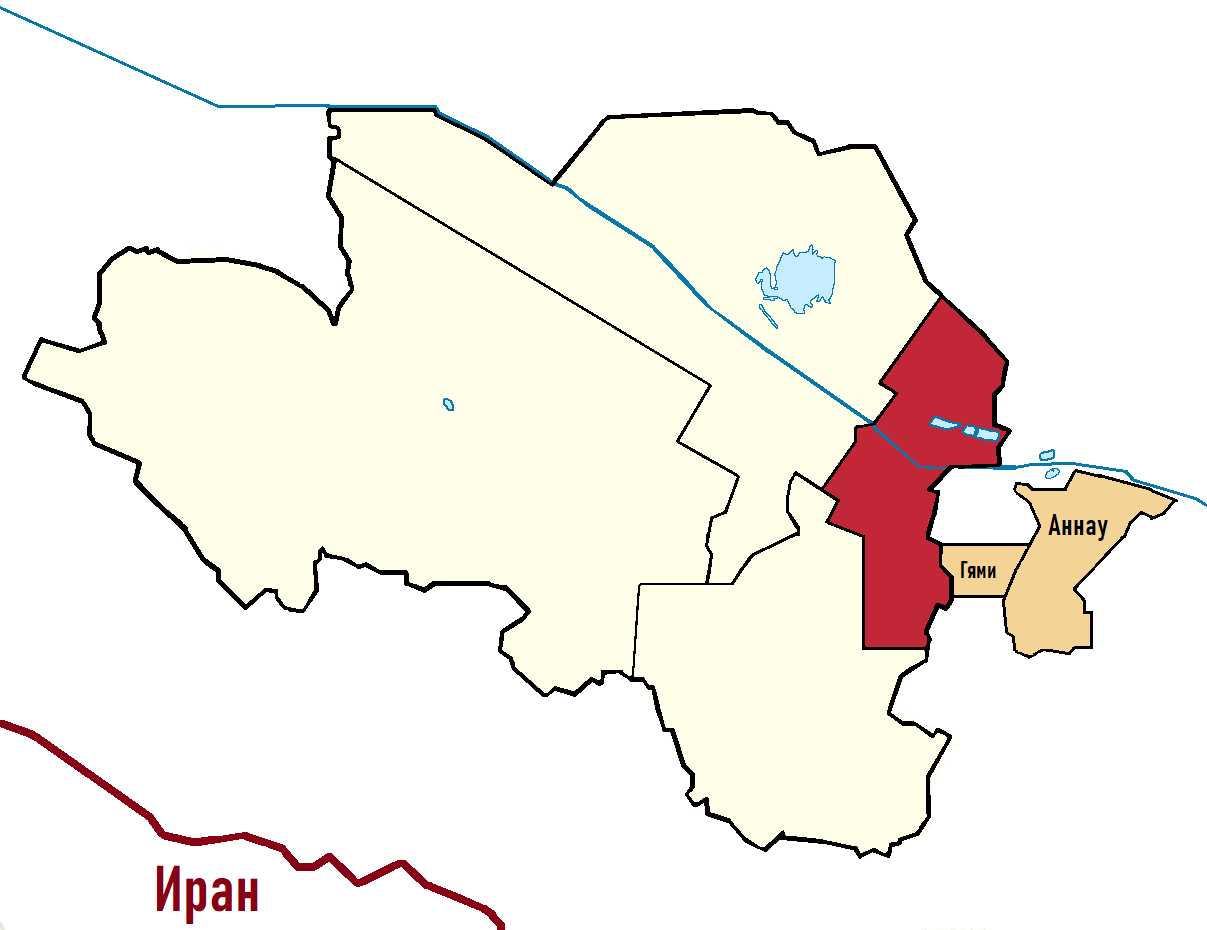
- Interactive map of Berkararlyk District
- Country: Turkmenistan
- Province: Aşgabat

Area
  - Total: 70.9 km^{2} (27.4 sq mi)

Population (2022 census)
  - Total: 266,425
  - Density: 3,760/km^{2} (9,730/sq mi)
- Time zone: UTC+5 (+5)

Berkararlyk District is a borough of Aşgabat in Turkmenistan. As a borough, it is headed by a presidentially appointed mayor (Turkmen: häkim).

== Etymology ==
The word berkarar in Turkmen means "stable, strong" with a connotative meaning "steadfast". The Turkic suffix -lyk denotes "state of being", i.e., "steadfastness, stability, strength".

== Places of interest ==
- Turkmen State Institute of Architecture and Construction

== See also ==
- Ashgabat
- Districts of Turkmenistan
