= Büzmeýin District =

District in Ashgabat, Turkmenistan

Büzmeýin District Büzmeýin etraby Abadan etraby 2002-2018
- District
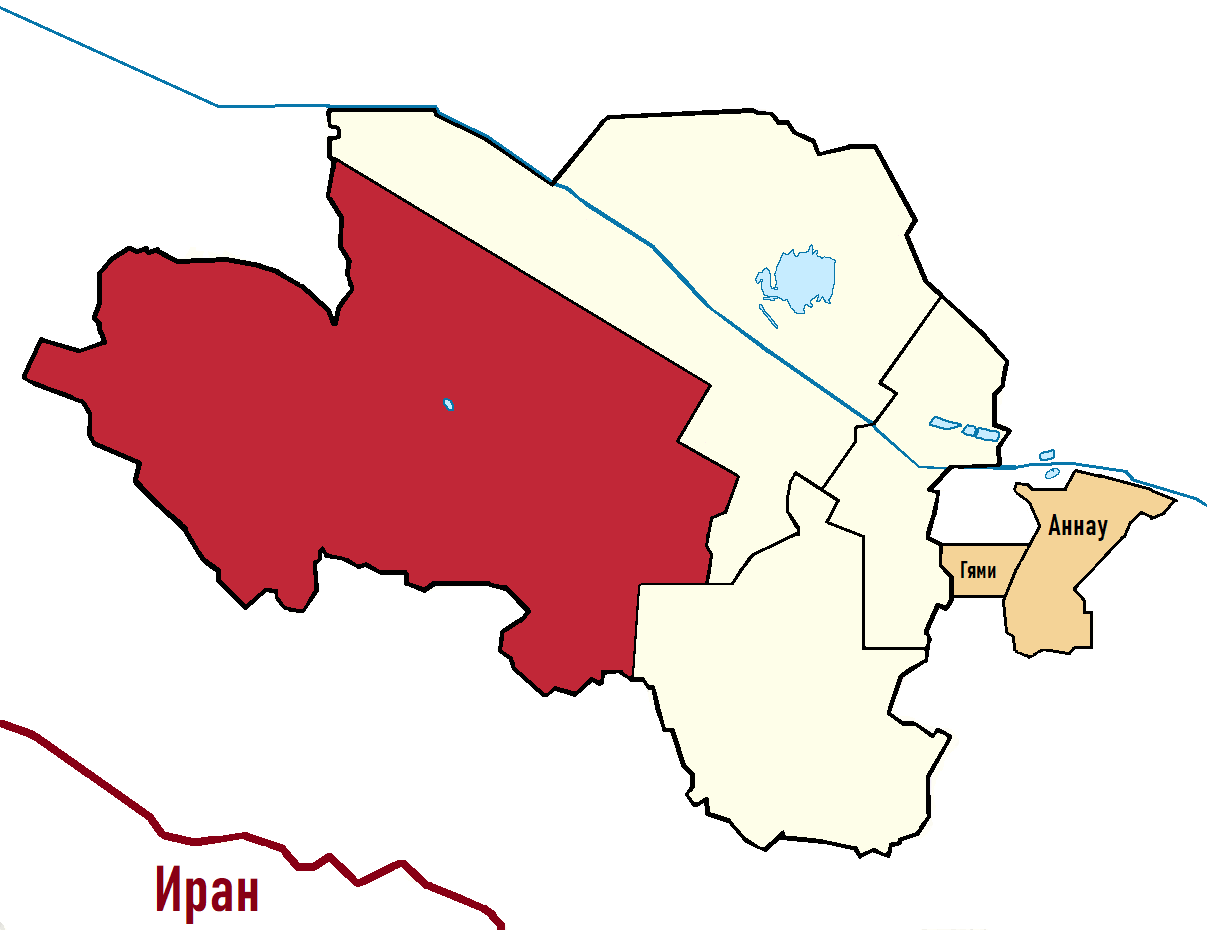
- Country: Turkmenistan
- Province: Aşgabat

Government
  - häkim: Atamyrat Gurbandurdyýewiç Rejepalyýew

Area
  - Total: 419.85 km^{2} (162.10 sq mi)

Population (2022 census)
  - Total: 175,179
  - Density: 417.24/km^{2} (1,080.7/sq mi)
- Time zone: UTC+5
- postal code: 744000
- Area code: (+993-12)

Büzmeýin District (Turkmen: Büzmeýin etraby, from 2002 to 2018 called Abadan District, expanded in 2018 to include former Archabil District and Chandybil District) is a borough of Ashgabat, Turkmenistan. As a borough, it is headed by a presidentially appointed mayor (Turkmen: häkim). The borough known as Büzmeýin should not be confused with the neighborhood of the same name in Ashgabat, boundaries of which correspond to the former city of Büzmeýin/Abadan.

== History ==
In 2018, Abadan District of the city of Ashgabat was renamed Büzmeýin District.

== See also ==
- Ashgabat
- Büzmeýin, Turkmenistan
- Districts of Turkmenistan
