= Büzmeýin, Turkmenistan =

City in Ashgabat, Turkmenistan

Büzmeýin Abadan (2002–2018)
- Location in Turkmenistan
- Coordinates: 38°03′06″N 58°12′36″E
- Country: Turkmenistan
- City: Ashgabat

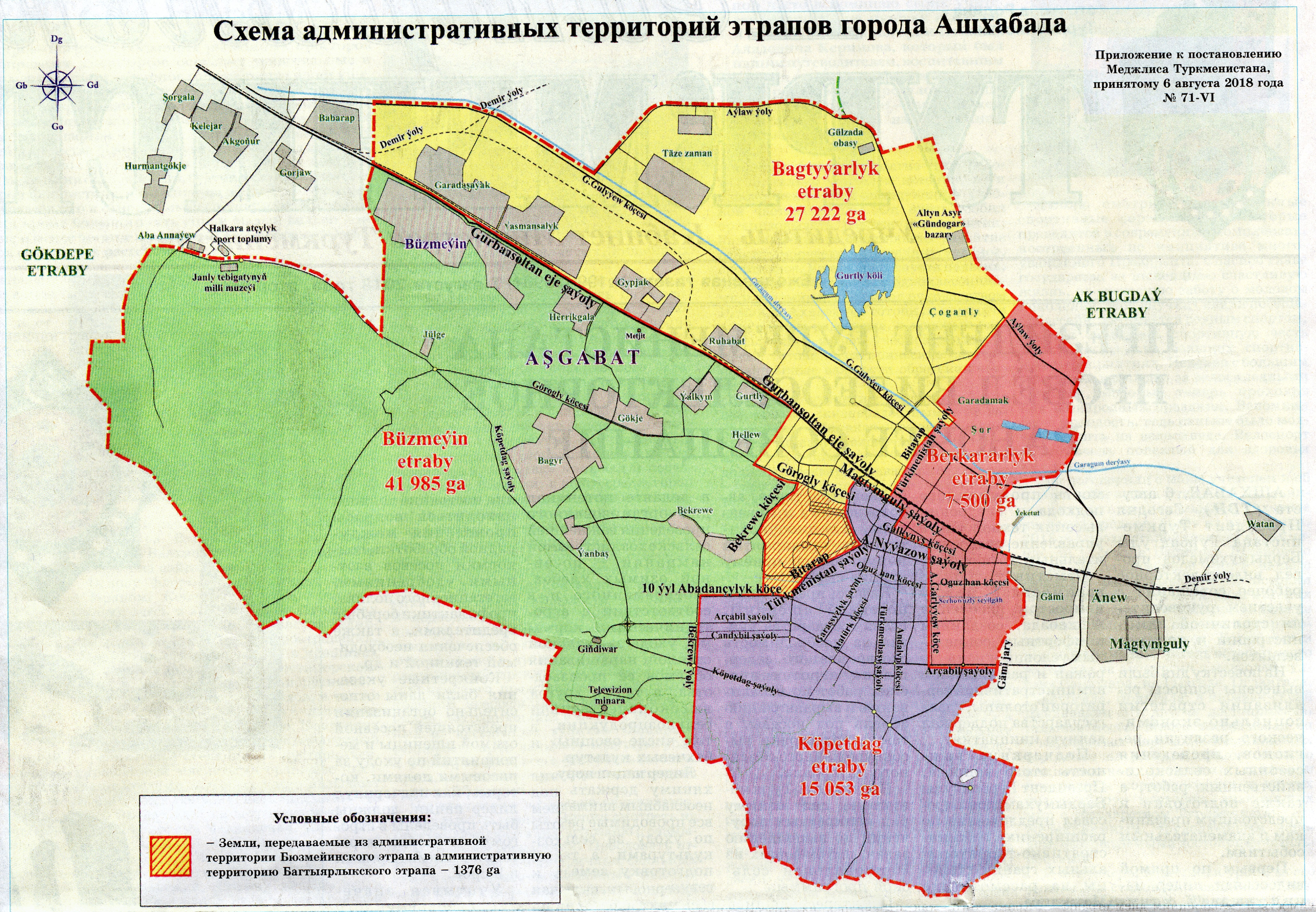
Map of districts of the city of Ashgabat. Büzmeýin District is shown in green, with the Büzmeýin neighbourhood shown on the northwest border with Bagtyýarlyk District (yellow).

Büzmeýin is the name of both a borough (Turkmen: uly etrap), Büzmeýin District, and a neighborhood (Turkmen: ýaşaýyş toplumy) of Ashgabat, the capital of Turkmenistan. Formerly a separate city in Ahal Province, in 2013 the city was incorporated into Ashgabat as part of a program that expanded the capital's area by about 15%.

The municipality was founded as a "town of urban type" but granted the status of a city in 1963. It bore the name Büzmeýin until October 2002, when its name was changed to Abadan by President Saparmurat Niyazov. In January 2018, the original name was restored. The traditional Russian form of the name is Bezmein (Безмейн).

== Etymology ==
According to the Turkmen Academy of Sciences, "Büzmeýin" is derived from medieval Arabic "buza" (alcoholic beverage, beer) plus Persian "mayim" (raisin, grape plant), a reference to the area's historic use for wine grape production and wine warehousing, dating back to when Nisa was capital of the Parthian Empire.

Niyazov claimed Büzmeýin to be a meaningless word, and in late 2002 the new name became Abadan (Persian: آبادان, literally meaning 'the Prosperous Place') — a billboard at the town-entrance even features an eponymous poem by him.

== Transport ==
About 25 km. from central Ashgabat, the center of the former town is served by a station on the national railway system and by municipal bus service. The M37 highway passes through the neighborhood.

== Industries ==
Büzmeýin was developed as an industrial town. Niyazov worked at the Büzmeýin State Electrical Power Plant for three years, before entering a political career.

=== 2011 explosion ===
On 7 July 2011, around 16:45 local time, massive blasts struck the city. According to government officials, they occurred at a fireworks warehouse, killing 2 military men and 13 civilians. Opposition groups, however, claim it was in fact a Soviet-era arms depot that caused the explosions, with a death toll exceeding 1,300 victims.

== See also ==
- Ashgabat
- Büzmeýin District
- Railway stations in Turkmenistan
