= World of Turkmenbashi Tales =

Theme Park in Ashgabat, Turkmenistan

Ashgabat Theme Park
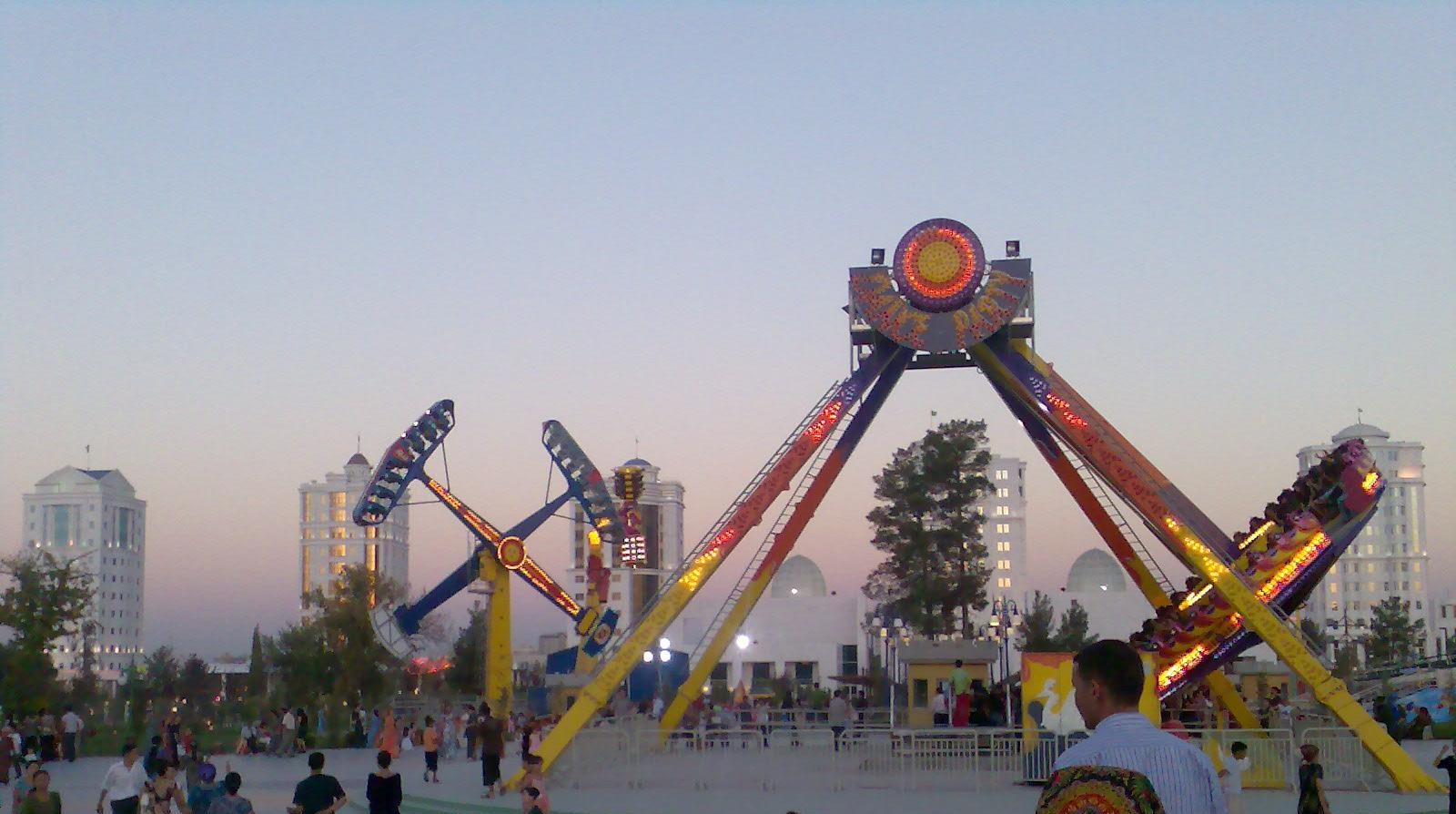
- Ashgabat Theme Park
- Interactive map of Ashgabat Theme Park
- Location: Ashgabat, Turkmenistan
- Coordinates: 37°55′20.07″N 58°22′19.47″E
- Status: Operating
- Opened: 2006
- Area: 41 ha (100 acres)

Ashgabat Theme Park (Ertekiler Dünýäsi) is a theme park designed by Turkmen architects as a Turkmen version of Disneyland. It opened in Ashgabat, Turkmenistan, in 2006.

The amusement park is a popular venue for concerts.

== History ==
The $50 million recreation complex, based on Turkmen folk art and fairy tales, occupies 100 acres (0.40 km^{2}) and consists of 80 attractions. It begins with a map of Turkmenistan and its environs that displays miniature copies of architectural monuments of the predominantly Muslim state. The Ferris Wheel follows designs of Turkmen jewelry, the Magic Carpet copies acclaimed Turkmen rugs, and a roller coaster zigzags over a mini-replica of the Caspian Sea, the source of the country's immense oil and gas reserves. Visitors are greeted by characters of Turkmen folklore, some of which resemble Western magic creatures. Khudoiberdy repels an attack of evil spirits, and obese Bovendjik swallows everyone he sees.

In May 2024, the renovated amusement park opened after two years of reconstruction. Carousels, modern catamarans, and children's playgrounds were updated. A new 20-meter dancing fountain was built in the park.
