= Owadan-depe Prison =

Political prison in Turkmenistan

Owadan-depe
- Location within Turkmenistan
- Location: Near Owadan-depe, Ahal Region, Turkmenistan; 38°23′06″N 58°16′13″E
- Status: In operation
- Security class: Maximum security
- Capacity: 150+
- Opened: 2002
- Managed by: Ministry of Internal Affairs, Ministry for National Security

Owadan-depe (also Owadandepe, Owadan Depe, Ovadan Depe, 'beautiful hill' in Turkmen) is a prison for political inmates in the Ahal Region of Turkmenistan established by the regime of former President Saparmyrat Nyýazow to incarcerate political opposition supporters, former public officials and prisoners charged with supporting Wahhabism.

Its official name is "Maximum Security Establishment AG-D/5" (AN-T/2 in other sources) and it is located in the Karakum Desert about 30 kilometres from the village (reported to have been depopulated by the authorities) and train station of the same name, 70 kilometres to the north-east of Ashgabat. The prison is situated in a lowland surrounded by hills about 6 kilometres from the nearest roads.

== History ==
It has been reported that the planning of the prison was started shortly before the assassination attempt against President Nyýazow in November 2002 and the following wave of repressions. The prison was built from 2002 to 2008 using reinforced concrete with a planned capacity of approximately 150 inmates, consisting of 6 blocks of 26 cells, although the prison is reported to be regularly overcrowded. A separate maximum security block houses hardened criminals. The complex is surrounded by three rings of fencing, with the internal perimeter and the political section being guarded by a special military unit of the Ministry of Internal Affairs. The second and third rings are guarded by servicemen of the Internal Affairs Ministry, Ministry for National Security, Ministry of Defense and the Office of the Prosecutor General. There are also separate barracks housing a special forces unit which enters the prison in the case of a riot. All contact between prison staff and prisoners is strictly forbidden.

During Nyýazow's rule, newly appointed officials were brought on tours of the prison to intimidate them. In December 2006, right after the death of Nyýazow, a prison riot broke out in Owadan-depe. Human rights activists reported that 23 inmates were shot during the suppression of the riot. Another riot occurred in 2007, when prisoners started to cut their veins and stab their stomachs en masse to protest continued beatings and torture. The protesters were then handcuffed to cell bars and the prison warden threw salt on their wounds. After the suppression of the riot and the firing of the prison warden, the conduct of the administration towards the inmates improved slightly.

During the term of President Nyýazow, Owadan-depe was exclusively purposed to hold political prisoners and politicians that had 'fallen from grace', but since 2007 criminal convicts were brought to the prison as well. Crime bosses and prisoners convicted of serious crimes were also held in the prison until 2014, when they were relocated to other prisons. Afterwards, it was announced that the prison would be renovated by installing a new water line, repairing sanitary facilities and installing water boilers.

== Prison layout and conditions ==
Prison layout: checkpoint; special regime wing; Internal Ministry Troops base. Main building: canteen, infirmary; Block 5 (political prisoners); administration office; exercise cells on the roof; Block 7 (suspected Wahhabis).

Owadan-depe is known for its appalling conditions: in summer the cells are hot and poorly ventilated, in winter – cold and unheated; sanitation problems; inadequate drinking water, food, medicine and medical care. Some of the cells are overcrowded, others are dark, cylinder-shaped solitary cells. Cells nicknamed "humped cells" have low ceilings, which don't allow prisoners to fully stand up. In some cells the windows are shut with metal blinders so that prisoners have to bend to see the sky. Prisoners have no means of contact with the rest of the world – meeting relatives, receiving packages from them, newspapers, television, radio and phones are forbidden. The government also bars representatives of international, religious and human rights organisations from visiting the prison.

According to testimony from former inmates, the harsh climate, torture and the lack of proper medical care has resulted in a high mortality rate from disease (mostly tuberculosis) and exhaustion, as well as a high rate of suicide and mental trauma. Regular beatings and abuse by guard dogs is the norm. Inmates with a life sentence are held in legcuffs for long periods of time. There are reports of various types of torture: needles being pinned under nails, by strangulation, by live electric wires, sexual abuse, forced intake of psychoactive substances and the deprivation of food and water. Relatives of deceased inmates are not given notice and do not receive the body. Prisoners of Owadan-depe are exempt from amnesty.

As of 2014, political prisoners are held in Block 5 and have separate security from the Ministry of National Security (criminal convicts and suspected Wahhabis are guarded by servicemembers of the Ministry of the Interior). There is almost no contact between them and other prisoners and staff. Prisoner uniforms are manufactured at the local textile workshop and only one is issued to an inmate per year. Ordinary convicts must wear a tag on their chest with their surname and the article of the Criminal Code under which they have been sentenced, political prisoners – a number and the Turkmen phrase "Watan dönügi" ("Traitor of the homeland") on their backs. They are also allowed to wash only once every 10 days with cold water and only at night.

Inmates that have been charged of being Wahhabis, are held in Block 7 and 8. Some of the solitary cells in Block 7 are inhabited by former high-ranking officials (cabinet ministers, prosecutors and generals). Foreigners—Turkish, Iranian and Afghani nationals—have been held in some of the cells in Block 8. A walk is allowed just a few times per month in special cells on the roofs on the blocks. Every day an inmate received 175 g of bread, porridge (every morning and evening) and for dinner – soup with five potatoes per every cell.

== Literary sources ==
- Country Reports on Human Rights Practices for 2008 Vol.1. — Government Printing Office. — ISBN 978-0-16-087515-1.
- Jane's Information Group. Jane's Foreign Report. — Jane's Information Group Limited, 2007.
- The Ovadan Depe Prison – Prove They Are Alive Campaign (September 2014)
