= Beýik Türkmenbaşy District =

Beýik Türkmenbaşy District (Turkmen: Beýik Türkmenbaşy adyndaky etrap) was a district of Lebap Province in Turkmenistan. It was abolished in November 2017 and its territory transferred to Döwletli District. In turn, on 9 November 2022, Döwletli District was dissolved and its territories were divided between Hojambaz District and Köýtendag District. The capital of the district, Döwletli, was transferred to the former.
