= Muhammetguly Ogshukov =

Muhammetguly Ogshukov (also, Muhammet Ogshukov) is a lawyer and former Prosecutor General of Turkmenistan.

== Early life ==
Ogshukov was born in 1959. He graduated from Turkmen State University in 1986.

== Career ==
As an Assistant Prosecutor General, Ogshukov is said to have played an important role in ensuring a smooth succession of power from Niyazov to Berdimuhamedow by implicating potential rivals in trumped up charges. On 10 April 2006, he was appointed as the Prosecutor General, replacing Gurbanbibi Atajanov who had resigned of ill-health. (Note: Slavomir Horak, a noted analyst of Turkmenistan believe it to be a typical purge.)

After a tenure of about two years—marked with active participation in ceremonial purges of political authority—, he was fired on 3 March 2008 for failing to discharge his duties. Chary Hojamuradov, incumbent Chairman of Supreme Court, was roped in as his replacement. Nothing much is known about his current life.
