= Döwletli =

Döwletli Döwletli şäherçesi
- Town
- Location in Turkmenistan
- Coordinates: 38.01105°N 65.56845°E
- Country: Turkmenistan
- Province: Lebap Province
- District: Döwletli District

Population (2022 official census)
  - Town: 6,211
  - Urban: 4,942
  - Rural: 1,269
- Time zone: UTC+5

Döwletli, formerly known as Jeýhun, is a town and capital of Döwletli District, Lebap Province, Turkmenistan. It is located circa 30 km south of the border with Uzbekistan, 35 km northeast of Kerki, and 200 km southeast of Türkmenabat. In 2022, it had a population of 4,942 people.

== Etymology ==
In Turkmen, Döwletli is derivated from the word Döwlet, which roughly translates as wealth, prosperity, or well-being. Thus, Döwletli may be translated as "a prosperous place."

== History ==
The town was initially named Jeýhun, from the name of the Amu Darya River in Arabic. It was established less than a kilometer north of the village of Bataş. On 10 May 2010, the name was changed to Döwletli to match the district's name.

On 7 July 2016, the village of Bataş was merged into Döwletli.

On 9 November 2022, Döwletli District was abolished and its territories were divided between Hojambaz and Köýtendag Districts. The town was transferred to Hojambaz District. On 19 September 2025, the district was re-established and all changes were reverted.

== Dependencies ==
There are three villages that depend on Döwletli:

- Döwletli, town
  - Aşgabat, village
  - Garagum, village
  - Miras, village

== See also ==
- Döwletli District
- List of municipalities in Lebap Province
- Towns of Turkmenistan
