= Döwletli District =

Döwletli District Döwletli etraby
- District
- Interactive map of Döwletli District
- Country: Turkmenistan
- Province: Lebap Province
- Capital: Döwletli
- Established: August, 2007

Area
  - District: 999,090 acres (404,316 ha)

Population
  - District: 104,864
  - Density: 9,990/sq mi (3,856/km^{2})
  - Urban: 43,923
  - Rural: 60,941
- Time zone: UTC+5 (+5)

Döwletli District (Turkmen: Döwletli etraby) is a district of Lebap Province, Turkmenistan. It borders Uzbekistan to the north, but also Halaç, Hojambaz, Kerki and Köýtendag Districts. Its administrative center is the town of Döwletli. According to 2022 census, its constituencies had a total population of 104,864 people.

== Etymology ==
The district borrows the name of its capital city, Döwletli, which is derivated from the word Döwlet, which roughly translates as wealth, prosperity, or well-being. Thus, Döwletli may be translated as "a prosperous place."

== History ==
On 25 November 2017, Beýik Türkmenbaşy District was abolished and its territories were transferred to Döwletli District.

On 9 November 2022, Döwletli District was abolished and its territories were divided between Hojambaz and Köýtendag Districts. 220,776 hectares went to Hojambaz, including Döwletli itself, and 183,540 hectares went to Köýtendag. On 19 September 2025, the district was re-established and all changes were reverted.

== Administrative Subdivisions ==
Döwletli District includes seven third-level subdivisions, one city, three towns, and six rural councils. Those subdivisions include 40 villages:

=== Cities ===
- Dostluk

=== Towns ===
- Amyderýa
- Döwletli, including three villages
- Kerkiçi

=== Rural Councils ===
- Berkararlyk, including three villages
- Burguçy, including four villages
- Daşrabat, including five villages
- Hojahaýran, including five villages
- Pagtaçy, including three villages
- Tallymerjen, including three villages
- Täzedurmuş, including three villages
- Türkmenistan, including eight villages
- Ýalkym, including three villages

== See also ==
- Districts of Turkmenistan
- Döwletli
