= Hojambaz District =

Hojambaz District Höjambaz Etraby
- District
- Interactive map of Hojambaz District
- Country: Turkmenistan
- Province: Lebap Province
- Capital: Hojambaz

Area
  - Total: 3,080 sq mi (7,978 km^{2})

Population (2022 census)
  - Total: 110,376
  - Density: 35.83/sq mi (13.84/km^{2})
- Time zone: UTC+5 (+5)

Hojambaz District is a district of Lebap Province in Turkmenistan. The administrative center of the district is the town of Hojambaz.

On 9 November 2022, Döwletli District was dissolved and its territories were divided, some including the town of Döwletli to this district, and the rest to Köýtendag District. Previously, on 28 November 2017, Beýik Türkmenbaşy District was dissolved, and its territories were included in Döwletli District.

== Administrative Subdivisions ==
- Cities (şäherler)
  - Hojambaz
- Towns (şäherçeler)
  - Beşir
  - Döwletli (inc. Dostluk obasy, Miras)
  - Garamätnyýaz
  - Garaşsyzlygyň 15 ýyllygy (lit. 15th Independence Anniversary)

- Village councils (geňeşlikler)
  - Berkararlyk (Berkararlyk, Magtymguly)
  - Burdalyk (Burdalyk, Baýat)
  - Galkynyş (Babadaýhan, Eleç, Ýaşlyk, Tölekguýy)
  - Gultak (Gultak, Bekewül, Buýankökçi, Isamly, Ýabanyoba)
  - Gyzylgum (Çalyşlar, Çekiç, Gazanaryk)
  - Hojahaýran (Hojahaýran, Gyzguýy, Hojagürlük, Hojatutly, Körkak)
  - Kyrköýli (Kyrköýli, Egriýagyr, Gülüstan)
  - Mekan (Mekan, Abdal, Altynkök, Dänajy, Müsür)
  - Pagtaçy (Pagtaçy, Jeýhun, Nowruz)
  - Surhy (Sabynly, Surhy)
  - Tallymerjen (Tallymerjen, Demirýolçy, Sardaba, Watan)
  - Täzedurmuş (Täzedurmuş, Lebap)
