= Saýat =

Saýat Saýat şäheri
- City
- Location in Turkmenistan
- Coordinates: 38.779570°N 63.880901°E
- Country: Turkmenistan
- Province: Lebap Region
- District: Saýat District

Population (2022 official census)
  - Total: 21,619
- Time zone: UTC+5

Saýat is a city and capital of Saýat District in Lebap Region, Turkmenistan. The city is located on the left bank of the Amu Darya River, circa 35 km southeast of Türkmenabat. In 2022, it had a population of 21,619 people.

== Etymology ==
Saýat is the name of a Turkmen tribe, and originally comes from the Arabic word for "hunter".

== See also ==
- Cities of Turkmenistan
- List of municipalities in Lebap Province
