= Gyzylaýak =

Village in Turkmenistan

Gyzylaýak (or Gyzyl Ayak) is a village in the Halaç District of the Lebap Province of Turkmenistan. It is about 2 km south of Zynhary.

== Etymology ==
The literal meaning of Gyzylaýak is "Red Leg".

== Site ==
About 3 km east of the village, stands the Idris Baba Madrasah, famed for its association with Magtymguly. The site is a popular excursion venue for Turkmen school students; a tree, under whose shade Magtymguly is said to have drafted his poems, is an object of veneration.
