= Kopetdag District =

Kopetdag District Köpetdag etraby Proletar District (1961-1993) Stalin District (-1961)
- District
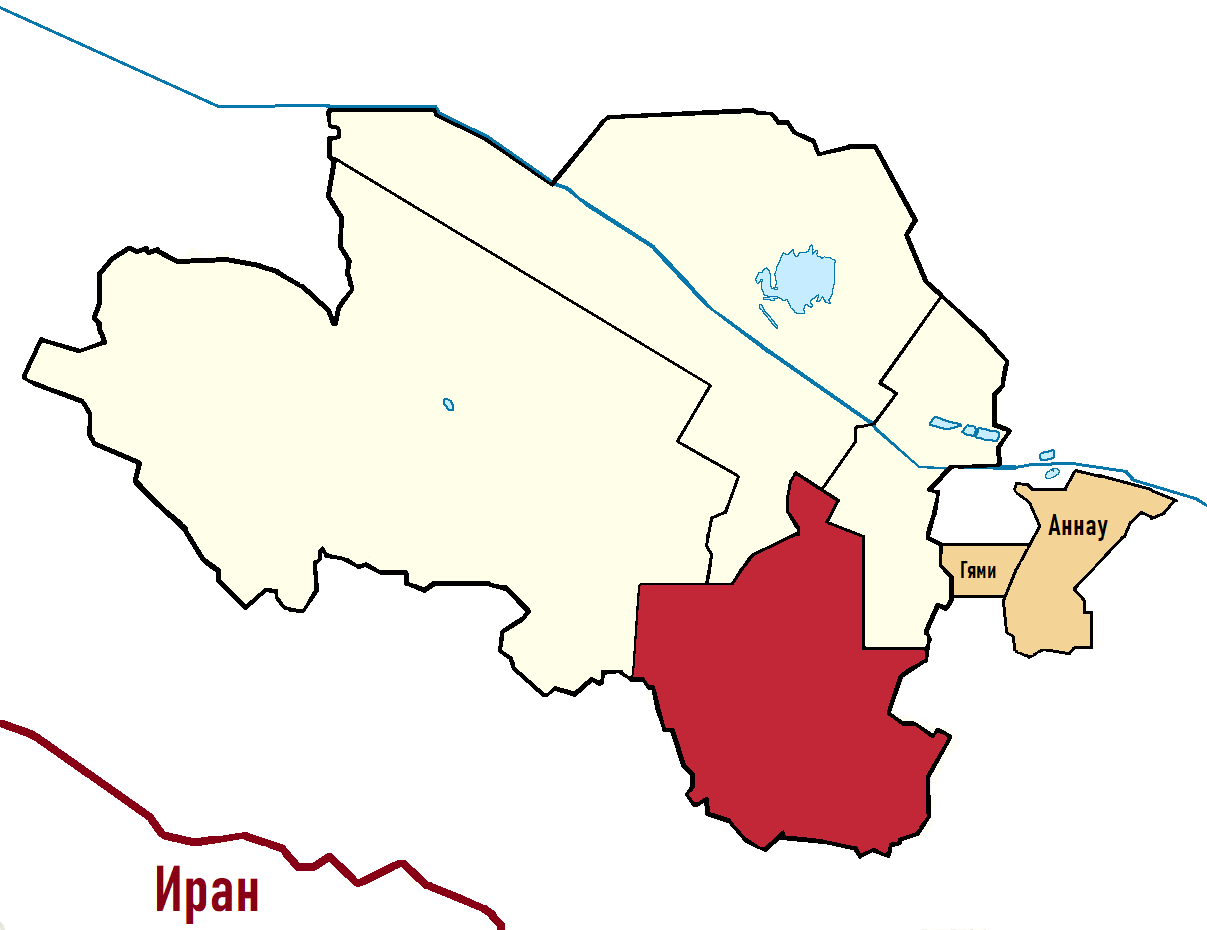
- Interactive map of Kopetdag District
- Country: Turkmenistan
- City: Ashgabat

Area
  - Total: 187.7 km^{2} (72.5 sq mi)

Population (2022 census)
  - Total: 278,840
  - Density: 1,486/km^{2} (3,848/sq mi)
- Time zone: UTC+5
- Postal code: 74000

Kopetdag District (Turkmen: Köpetdag etraby) is a borough of Aşgabat in Turkmenistan. As a borough, it is headed by a presidentially appointed mayor (Turkmen: häkim).

== Etymology ==
The district is named after the Kopet Dag (viz.) mountain range visible to the south.

== History ==
It is located in the historical center of Ashgabat. During the Soviet era, it was known by the names Stalin etraby and, after 1961, Proletar etraby, until it was renamed on 14 September 1993 by presidential decree to its present Köpetdag etraby.

According to the Soviet census of 1989, 149,996 people lived in the district.

In late 2021, the new State Tribune was opened on the outskirts of the district. The tribune's total area is 9,000 square metres (97,000 square feet) and includes a two-story domed building featuring a presidential tribune alongside 2,000 seat tribunes for guests. In addition, the largest, at 120-meters, LED screen in Central Asia was installed near the tribune. It was opened with the intention of holding mass events on national holidays. The annual Turkmen Independence Day Parade in honor of the country's 30th anniversary was held on this square in September 2021.

== Education ==
The Academy of the Ministry of National Security, the Turkmen State Border Service Institute, the Military Institute of the Ministry of Defense, and the Turkmen State Institute of Physical Education and Sports are located in the district.

== Other places of interest ==
- Turkmen Carpet Museum
- World of Turkmenbashi Tales

== See also ==
- Ashgabat
- Districts of Turkmenistan

== See also ==
- Districts of Turkmenistan
