= Bagtyýarlyk District =

Bagtyýarlyk District President Niyazov District Lenin District
- District
- Bagtyýarlyk etraby
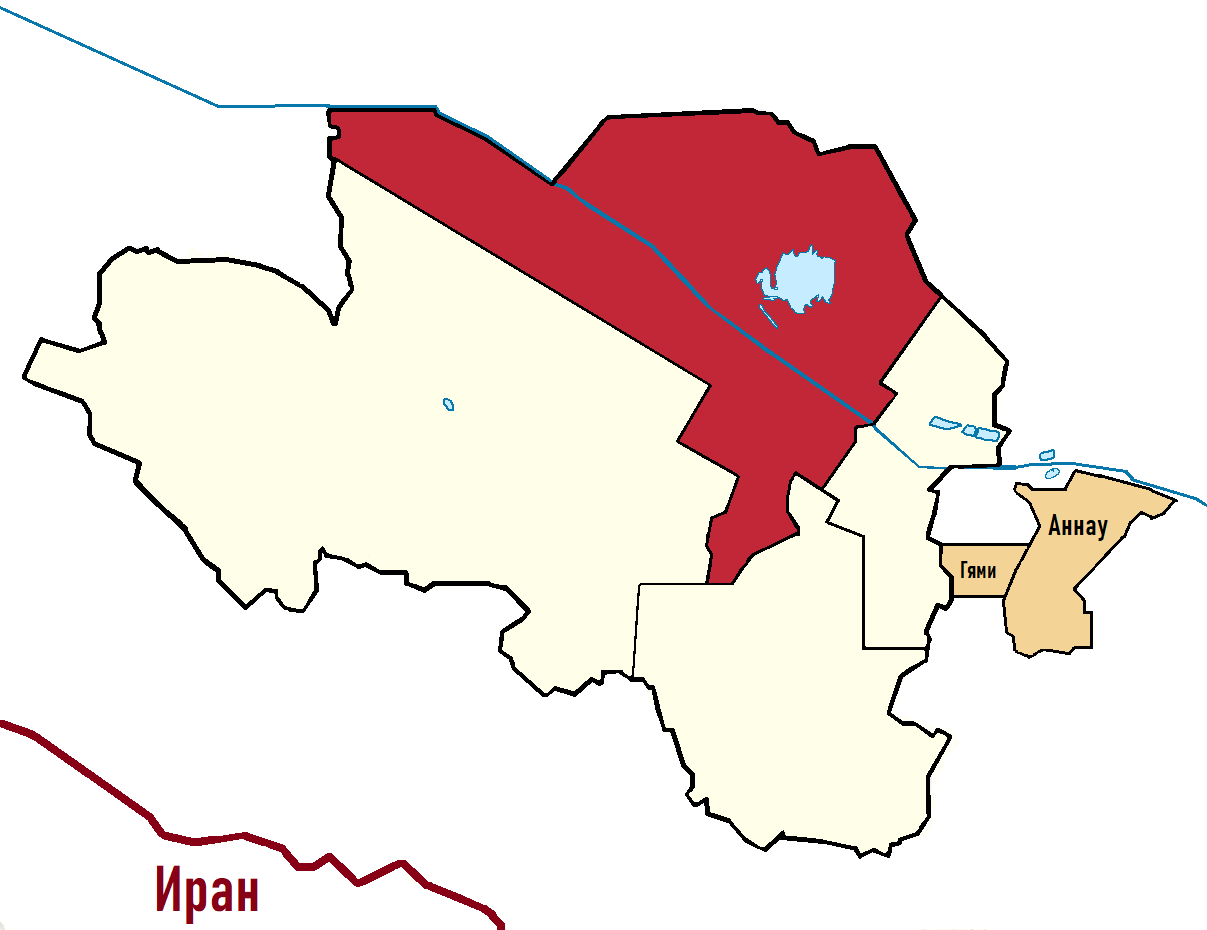
- Interactive map of Bagtyýarlyk District
- Country: Turkmenistan
- City: Ashgabat

Area
  - Total: 272.22 km^{2} (105.10 sq mi)

Population (2022 census)
  - Total: 309,619
  - Density: 1,137.4/km^{2} (2,945.8/sq mi)
- Time zone: UTC+5 (+5)

Bagtyýarlyk District is a borough of Ashgabat, Turkmenistan.

== Etymology ==
The word bagtyýarlyk means "having luck or happiness". This name stems from the Persian word "Bakhtyar" (بختیار) meaning "luck or happiness", plus the suffix "-lyk", denoting the possession of the root word.

== Places of interest ==
- Ashgabat International Airport

== See also ==
- Ashgabat
- Districts of Turkmenistan
