= Ahal Region =

Region of Turkmenistan

Coordinates: 38°30′N 59°0′E

Ahal Ahal welaýaty
- Region
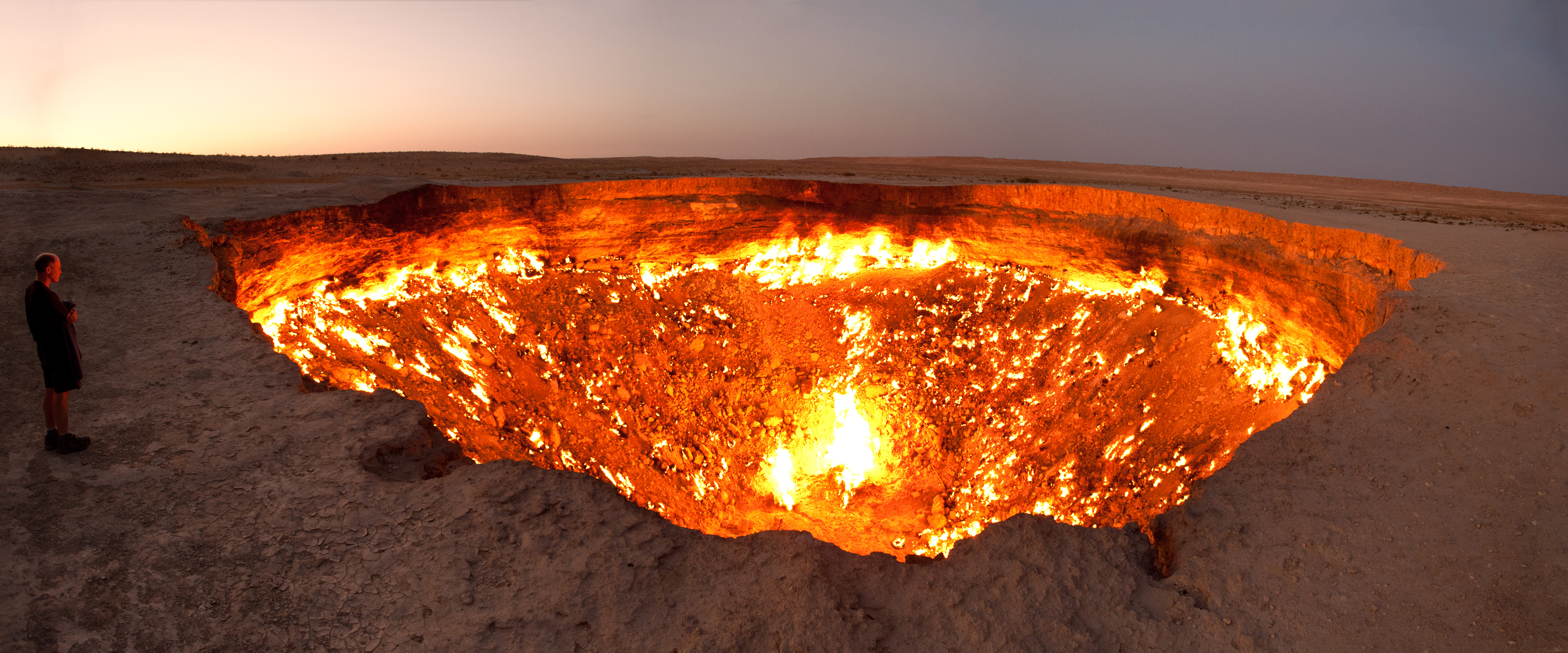
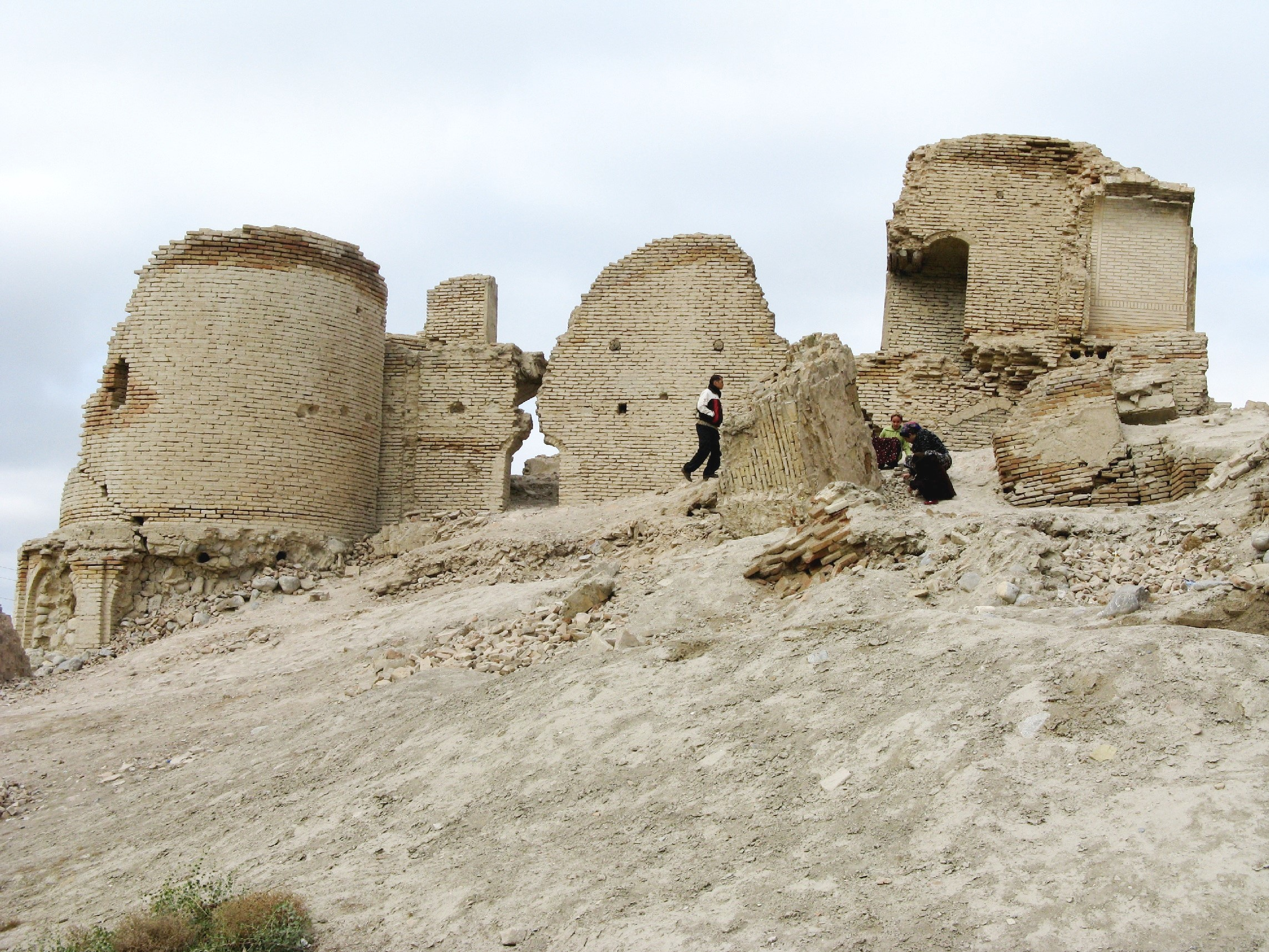
- From the top, Darvaza Gas Crater, Ruins of Seýit Jemaladdin Mosque

- Ahal region in Turkmenistan
- Country: Turkmenistan
- Capital: Arkadag

Government
  - Governor: Ýazmuhammet Gurbanowa

Area
  - Total: 97,160 km^{2} (37,510 sq mi)

Population (2022 census)
  - Total: 886,845
  - Density: 9.128/km^{2} (23.64/sq mi)
- Website: ahalhakimlik.gov.tm/ru

Ahal Region (Turkmen: Ahal welaýaty, IPA: [ɑˈχɑːɫ βeˌɫɑːjɑˈtɯ]) is one of five provinces of Turkmenistan. It borders Iran and Afghanistan along the Kopet Dag range. Ahal covers an area of 97,160 km^{2} (37,510 sq mi), and it has a population of 886,845 as of the 2022 census.

== Overview ==
In 2000, Ahal Region accounted for 14% of Turkmenistan's population, 11% of the total number of employed, 23% of agricultural production (by value), and 31% of the country's total industrial production.

Ahal's agriculture is irrigated by the Karakum Canal, which stretches all the way across the province from east to west, tracking Turkmenistan's southern border. Another water source is the Tejen River, which flows north from Afghanistan in the southeast corner of the province, passing through two large reservoirs south of the city of Tejen.

Ahal is known for the Battle of Geok Tepe of 1881, today the site of the imposing Saparmurat Hajji Mosque, and for the Bäherden underground warm lake (in the Kov Ata karst cave), both west of Ashgabat.

The administrative centre of Ahal Province is Arkadag, a $1.5 billion mostly greenfield development just west of the city limit of Ashgabat, Turkmenistan's capital city. The city was named in honor of former president Gurbanguly Berdimuhamedow, whose official nickname is Arkadag. The capital until 20 December 2022 was Änew (or Anau), a city on the south-eastern outskirts of Ashgabat. One other notable city is Tejen in the south-east near the border with Mary Province. Turkmenistan's largest city, Ashgabat, is surrounded by Ahal Province, but as the national capital it enjoys status equal to that of a province and is outside Ahal Province's jurisdiction.

== History ==
From antiquity through the early 1800s, the area was populated by Persian-speaking peoples. Nisa, since 2013 located within the city limits of Ashgabat, was likely founded in the third century BCE and was the first capital of the Parthian Empire. The area just north of the Kopet Dag mountains forms an oasis due to runoff from the mountains and was thus part of the Silk Road caravan route from roughly 2000 BCE until around 1500 CE.

=== Turkmen period ===
British Lieutenant Colonel H.C. Stuart reported in 1881 that the Ahal branch of the Teke tribe of the Turkmen ethnic group arrived in the area around 1830 and established several semi-nomadic villages (auls) between what is now the city of Gyzylarbat and village of Gäwers, inclusive. The Ahal area was formally part of Persia but de facto autonomous under Turkoman tribal control until Russian forces defeated the Teke army at the Battle of Geok Tepe in January 1881.

=== Soviet period ===
Originally named Ashgabat oblasty in Turkmen (Russian: Ашхабадская область, Cyrillic Turkmen Ашгабат областы), the future Ahal Province was initially formed on 21 November 1939, abolished on 25 May 1959, and reconstituted on 27 December 1973. In 1977 Ashgabat oblasty was awarded the Order of Lenin.

=== Independent Turkmenistan ===
On 14 December 1992, the People's Council (Turkmen: Maslahaty) adopted Law No. 783-ХП, "On the Order of Deciding Issues of Administrative-Territorial Structure of Turkmenistan", and Resolution XM-6. These statutes changed the Russian word oblast' (область), rendered in Turkmen Cyrillic as област, to the Persian loan word welaýat in reference to provinces. The resolution renamed Ashgabat oblasty (Russian: Ашгабатская область, Turkmen Сyrillic: Ашгабат областы) to Ahal welaýaty. Anau was designated the capital of Ahal. The capital was moved to the new city of Arkadag on 20 December 2022.

== Etymology ==
Ataniyazov wrote,

The meaning of the name is not clear. Khiva historians Munis and Agahi write that the name means "drainage ditch" and it was so named because the Ahal lands were swampy and suitable for rice cultivation (MITT, II, p. 359)...Vambery, on the other hand, writes that the word is derived from the word ak [white] and the addition of -al (Vambery, p. 264).

== Demographic ==
=== Table of National composition of the population of Ahal region (2022) ===
Table:

| Ethnicity | Total | | Urban | | Rural | | |
| Ethnicity | Population | % | Population | % | Population | % | |
|---|---|---|---|---|---|---|---|
| Ethnicity | Turkmens | 874,431 | 98.60% | 303,698 | 96.78% | 570,733 | 99.60% |
| Persians | 5,479 | 0.62% | 4,981 | 1.59% | 498 | 0.09% | |
| Russians | 2,154 | 0.24% | 1,863 | 0.59% | 291 | 0.05% | |
| Uzbeks | 1,774 | 0.20% | 1,465 | 0.47% | 309 | 0.06% | |
| Azerbaijanis | 1,135 | 0.13% | 777 | 0.25% | 358 | 0.06% | |
| Balochi | 923 | 0.10% | 326 | 0.10% | 597 | 0.10% | |
| Tatars | 181 | 0.02% | 121 | 0.04% | 60 | 0.01% | |
| Kazakhs | 148 | 0.02% | 131 | 0.04% | 17 | 0.00% | |
| Armenians | 143 | 0.02% | 123 | 0.04% | 20 | 0.01% | |
| Kurds | 113 | 0.01% | 100 | 0.03% | 13 | 0.00% | |
| Afghans | 107 | 0.01% | 23 | 0.01% | 84 | 0.01% | |
| Ukrainians | 50 | 0.01% | 41 | 0.01% | 9 | 0.00% | |
| Lezgins | 24 | 0.00% | 16 | 0.01% | 8 | 0.00% | |
| Karakalpaks | 13 | 0.00% | 7 | 0.00% | 6 | 0.00% | |
| Koreans | 4 | 0.00% | 2 | 0.00% | 2 | 0.00% | |
| other nationalities | 166 | 0.02% | 111 | 0.04% | 55 | 0.01% | |
| total | 886,845 | 100% | 313,785 | 100% | 573,060 | 100% | |

== Administrative subdivisions ==
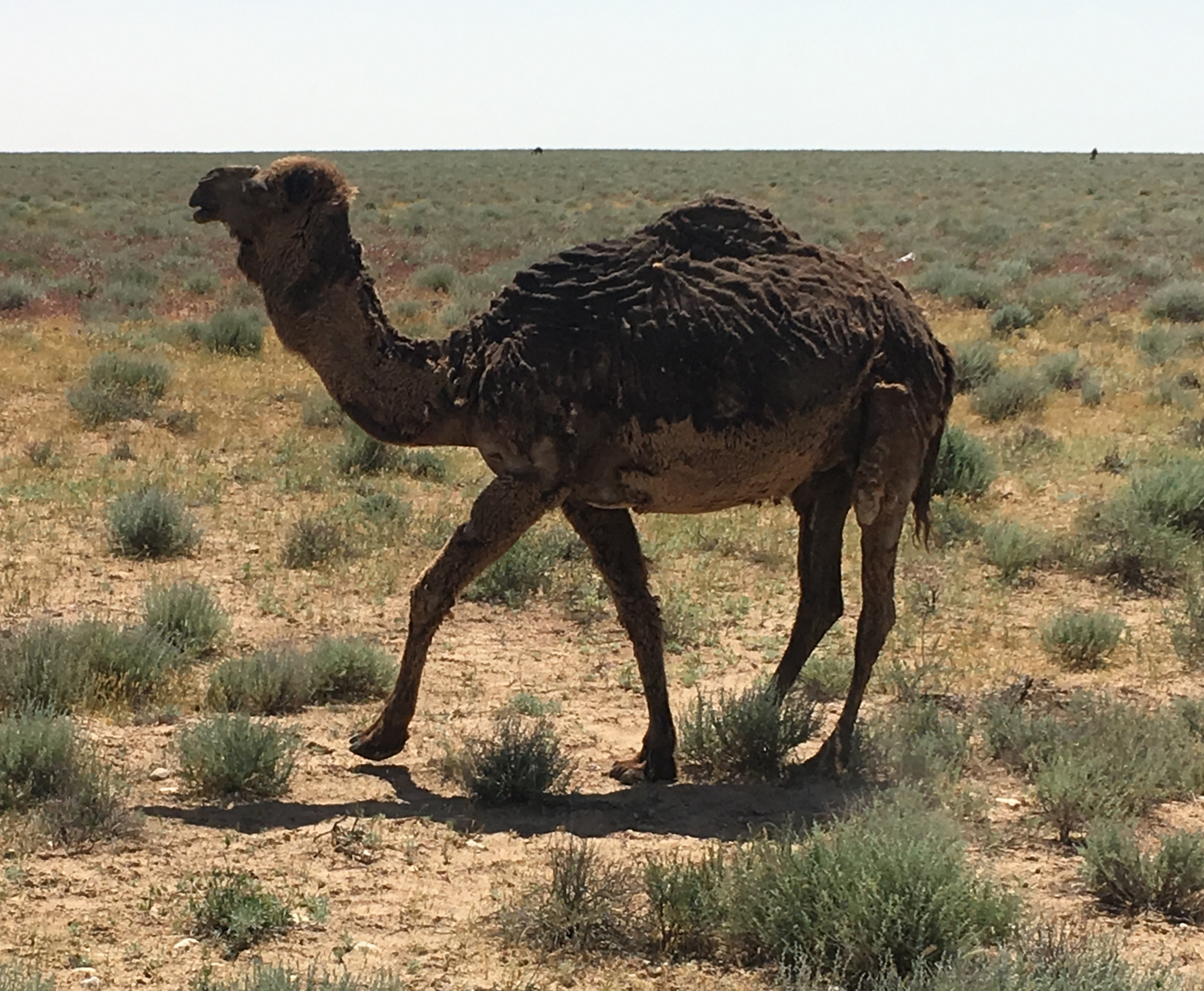
A camel roams the Karakum Desert in Ahal Province

=== Districts ===
Effective January 5, 2018, Ahal Province (Ahal welaýaty) is subdivided into 7 districts (etrap, plural etraplar):

1. Ak bugdaý (formerly Gäwers)
2. Babadaýhan (formerly Kirov)
3. Bäherden (formerly Baharly)
4. Gökdepe
5. Kaka
6. Sarahs
7. Tejen

=== Municipalities ===
As of 9 November 2022, the province included 9 cities (города or şäherler), 9 towns (посёлки or şäherçeler), 82 rural or village councils (сельские советы or geňeşlikler), and 231 villages (села, сельские населенные пункты or obalar).

- Altyn Asyr
- Änew
- Arkadag (provincial capital)
- Babadaýhan
- Bäherden
- Gökdepe
- Kaka
- Murche, abandoned village
- Sarahs
- Tejen

As of May 2013 Ruhabat District and the city of Abadan (today called Büzmeýin), until then in Ahal Province, were incorporated into the city of Ashgabat and abolished as separate municipalities. In January 2018, the Babadaýhan District of Ahal Province was re-established, and the Kaka, Tejen, Sarahs Districts were reaffirmed. Baharly's former name, Bäherden, was restored in the same decree, and the Altyn Asyr District was abolished.

On 9 November 2022 the new city of Arkadag was formally incorporated as the new capital city of Ahal and was accorded district status.

== Economy ==
=== Agriculture ===
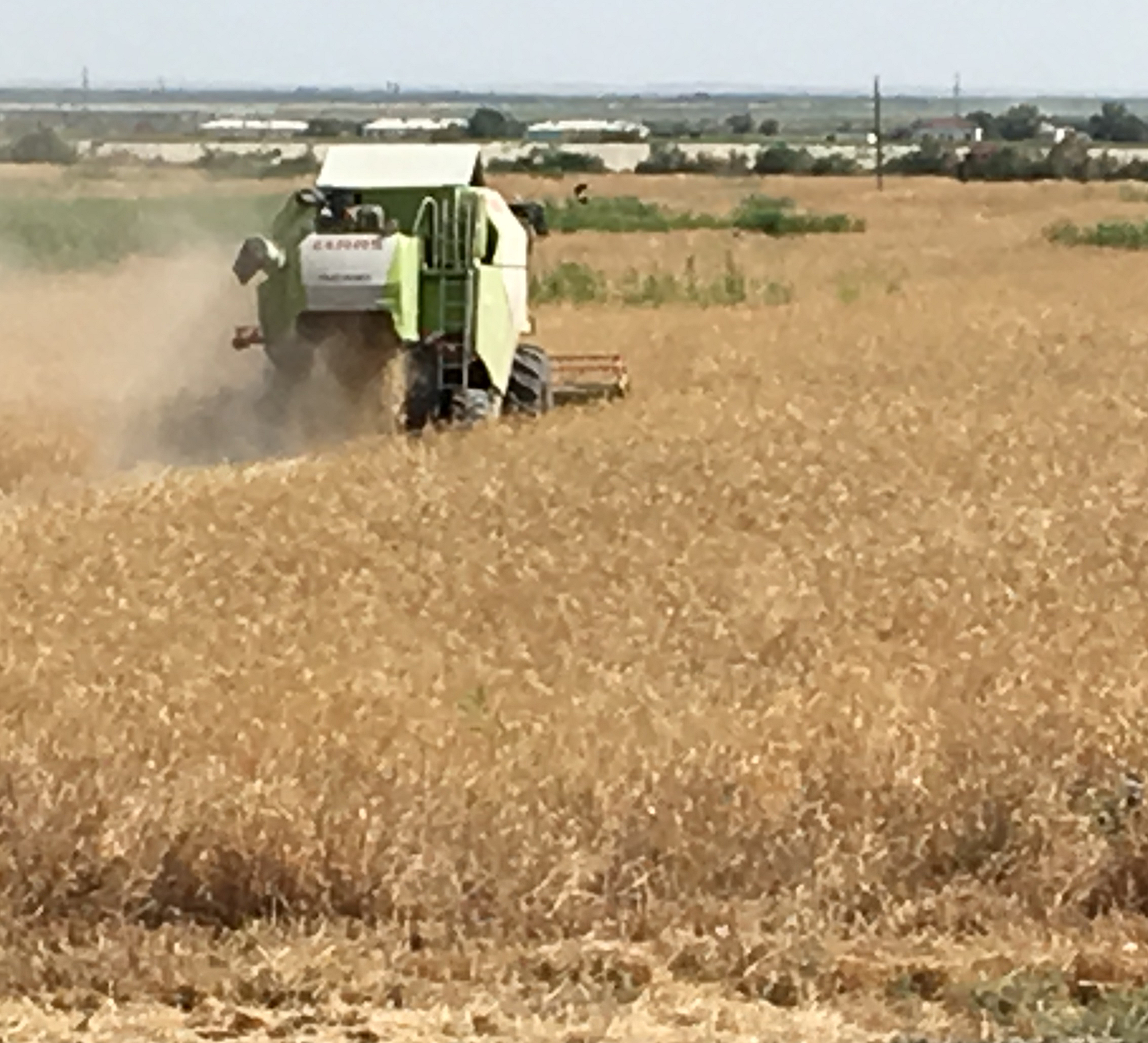
A Claas-brand combine harvests wheat in Ahal Province

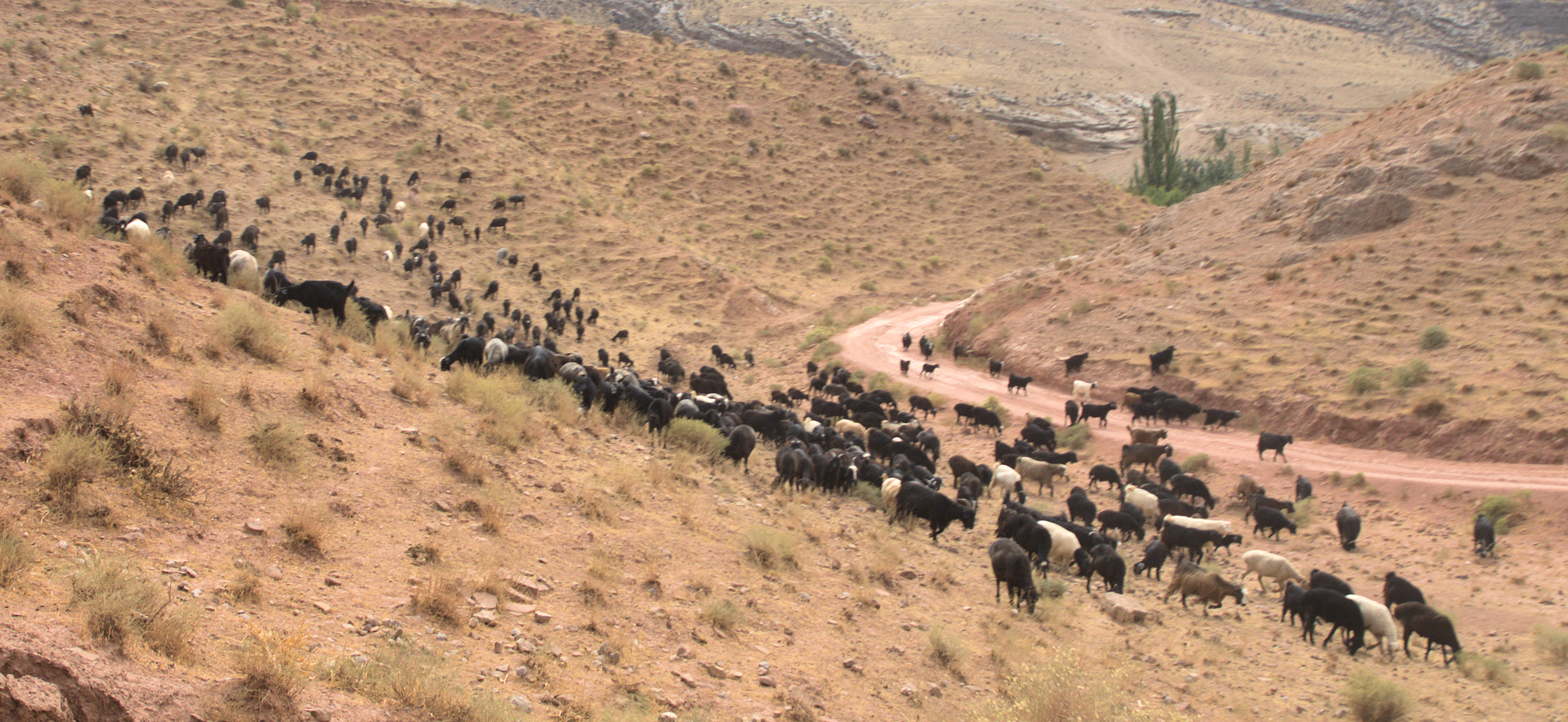
A mixed flock of goats and sheep grazes on a hillside in Ahal Province

Ahal produces wheat and cotton. Cotton grown in Ahal is ginned at mills in Akdepe, Gökdepe, Kaka, and Tejen, and spun into cotton yarn at mills in Ashgabat, Gökdepe, and Kaka. Textile complexes are found in Ashgabat, Akdepe (Bäherden), Gökdepe, and Kaka.

Cotton seed is crushed for extraction of oil and meal at the Ahal Vegetable Oil Enterprise plant near Ovadandepe. It was opened on 17 May 2010 with a design capacity to process 96,000 tons of cotton seed per year, with daily production of 50 tons of cottonseed oil, 10 tons of margarine, 140 tons of cottonseed meal and 70 tons of soybean hulls.

Ahal Province: area and production of selected crops, 2017-2019
| | area, thousand hectares | | | production, thousand tonnes | | |
| | 2017 | 2018 | 2019 | 2017 | 2018 | 2019 |
| Cereals and legumes | 240.8 | 216.0 | 219.6 | 491.1 | 345.4 | 504.6 |
| Cotton | 120.0 | 120.0 | 120.0 | 246.7 | 232.1 | 222.5 |
| Vegetables | 7.6 | 7.0 | 7.1 | 227.4 | 223.1 | 233.5 |

=== Industry ===
On June 28, 2019, a $1.7 billion factory for producing gasoline out of natural gas was commissioned in Ovadandepe, Gökdepe District. Built by Rönesans and Kawasaki using technology from Haldor Topsoe, the factory has a design capacity of 600,000 tonnes of gasoline, 12,000 tonnes of Diesel fuel, and 115,000 tonnes of liquefied petroleum gas per year, produced from 1.7 billion cubic meters of natural gas.

In 2019, Turkmenistan produced 5.1 million standard square meters (4mm thickness) of sheet glass, all of it in Ahal. A$375 million float glass and glass container plant built by Tepe Inşaat of Turkey was opened February 14, 2018, in Ovadandepe north of Ashgabat. It replaced a Soviet-era glass factory located in central Ashgabat. In 2019, the value of Turkmenistan's glass exports as reported by trading partners was $9.5 million.

A steel smelter, Türkmen Demir Önümleri Döwlet Kärhanasy (English: Turkmen Iron Products State Enterprise), operating on scrap metal is located at kilometer 22 on the Ashgabat-Dashoguz Automobile Highway near Ovadandepe. It produces mainly rebar and channel iron.

The $240 million Tejen urea (carbamide) plant, inaugurated on March 18, 2005, has a design capacity of 350,000 tonnes of urea per year.

The Baherden Cement Plant, put into operation in 2005, has a design capacity of one million tons of cement per year. In 2019 the Baherden plant reportedly was operating at 64% of capacity. The Kelete Cement Plant has a design capacity of one million tons per year, but as of 2019 was producing at 8.1% of that level.

The Derweze State Electrical Power Station (Turkmen: Derweze Döwlet Elektrik Stansiýasy), a 504.4 megawatt power plant built by Çalık Enerji in 2015, is located near Ovadandepe. The Ahal State Power Station (Turkmen: Ahal Döwlet Elektrik Stansiýasy), located about 9 kilometers NE of Anau, with design capacity of 650 megawatts, was constructed in 2010 to power the city of Ashgabat and expanded in 2013 and 2014 to power the Olympic Village.

Ahal Province: Production of selected industrial products, 2017-2019
| | 2017 | 2018 | 2019 |
| Electricity million kwh | 5,100.3 | 5,219.7 | 4,936.4 |
| Gas condensate thousand tonnes | 71.2 | 50.0 | 53.4 |
| Natural gas billion m^{3} | 11.7 | 10.9 | 10.9 |
| Gasoline thousand tonnes | - | - | 74.5 |
| Mineral fertilizer thousand tonnes (NPK basis) | 89.2 | 92.8 | 81.8 |
| Cement thousand tonnes | 1,131.3 | 984.6 | 733.3 |
| Sheet glass (4 mm standard thickness) million m^{2} | - | 4.4 | 5.1 |
| Bricks million | 36.4 | 38.2 | 31.6 |
| Cotton lint thousand tonnes | 60.7 | 33.6 | 60.8 |
| Cotton yarn thousand tonnes | 20.0 | 19.6 | 21.6 |
| Cotton fabric million m^{2} | 25.9 | 23.8 | 31.8 |

=== Government installations ===
The Ovadandepe Prison is located approximately 30 kilometers NNW of G. Orazow adyndaky oba, the seat of the Ovadandepe Rural Council (Turkmen: Owadandepe geňeşligi). The National Space Agency's ground station for communicating with the TurkmenÄlem-52E satellite is located approximately 6 kilometers north of the Ashgabat city limit off the P-1 highway.

== People ==
- Gurbanguly Berdimuhamedow
- Nurmuhammet Hanamow
- Berdi Kerbabayev
- Saparmurat Niyazov

== Partner regions ==
Ahal Region cooperates with:

- Moscow Oblast, Russia (1995)

== See also ==
- Teke (Turkmen tribe) § History
- Darvaza gas crater, a persistent natural gas fire
- OpenStreetMap Wiki: Ahal Province
- OpenStreetMap Wiki: Districts in Turkmenistan
