= Districts of Turkmenistan =

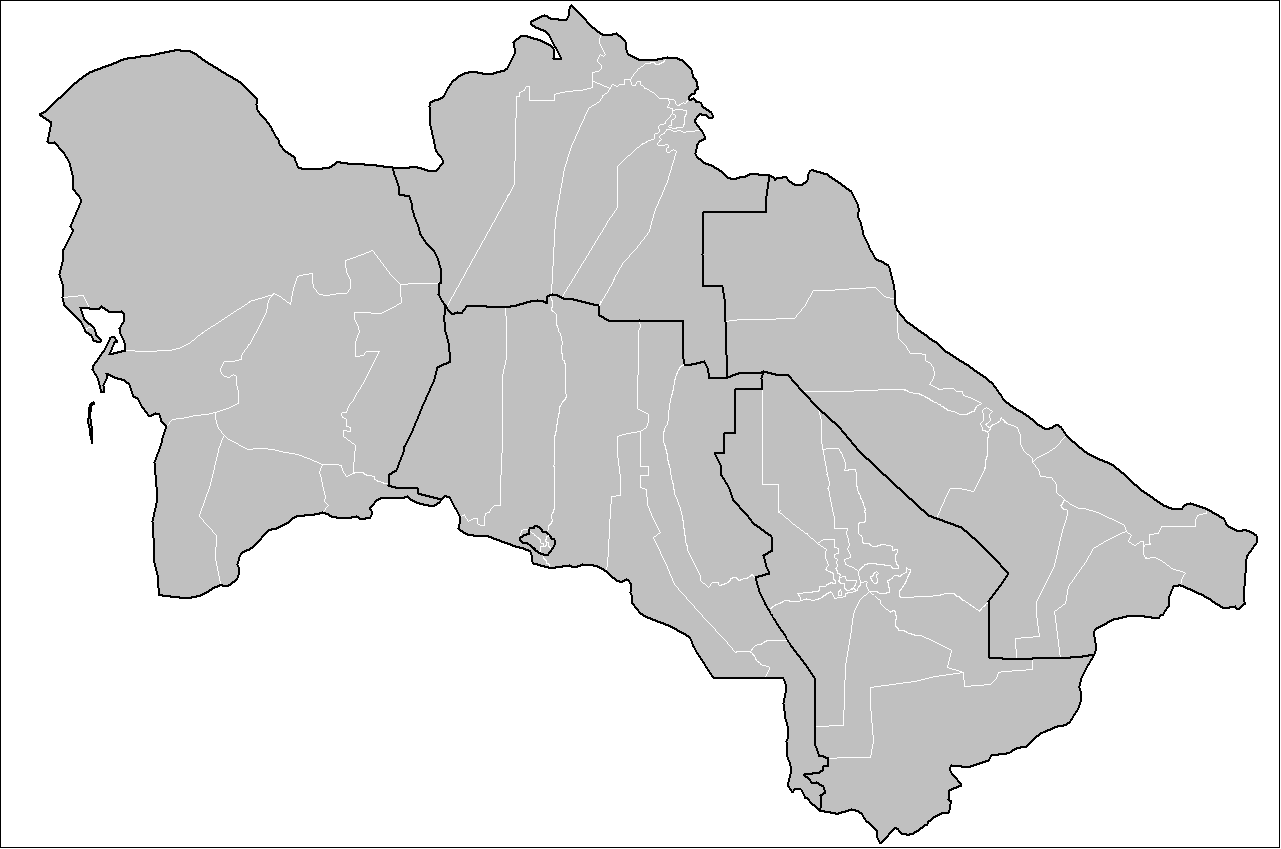
Provinces of Turkmenistan

An etrap, often translated as "district," is the second-level administrative division of Turkmenistan. In terms of hierarchy, an etrap is situated below a welaýat (province). An etrap may include several cities (in turkmen: "şäher" / pl. "şäherler"), towns ("şäherçe" / pl. "şäherçeler") and rural councils ("geňeşlik" / pl. "geňeşlikler") which include villages ("oba" / "pl. obalar"). An etrap is headed by an häkim (translated as "governor" in the case of a district, but translated as "mayor" in the case of a city, a town or a borough); they are appointed by the President of Turkmenistan (Constitution of Turkmenistan, Articles 80-81).

Some districts may not fit in the hierarchy expressed before, those are the following ones:

- Aşgabat, which is the only city to lawfully act as a province, is divided into four etraplar (here translated as "borough").
- 7 cities act lawfully as districts of their own. Those are the provinces' capital cities, Türkmenbaşy and Baýramaly.
  - Among those cities, Arkadag is the only one to be divided into two etraplar in the same way Aşgabat does.

Regarding cities "with district status" (Turkmen: etrap hukukly), by Turkmen law, "...such cities must have population over 30,000 and be the administrative center of a province (welaýat)." Although the law officially limits the possible number of such cities to five (the number of provinces), other cities are periodically accorded the status of a district. As of November 9, 2022, 7 cities in Turkmenistan own the status of district. Unlike other cities, they are headed by an häkim rather than a geňeş ("council") chaired by an arçyn ("elder") and have their own budget.

== List of districts ==
As of September 19, 2025, there are 58 districts in Turkmenistan. Among them, 7 are boroughs and 7 are cities with a district status. Here is a list of the districts of Turkmenistan arranged by administrative divisions and alphabetical order. Cities with a district status are highlighted in bold.

Name	Population (2022)	Area (km²)	Density	Number of towns, cities and rural councils	Number of villages	Capital	Administrative division
Ak bugdaý	144,119	22,370	6.443/km²	17	77	Änew	Ahal province
Altyn asyr	39,569	6,058	6.532/km²	7	13	Altyn asyr	Ahal province
**Arkadag**	567	47.53	11.93/km²	2	0	Arkadag	Ahal province
Babadaýhan	97,312	14,400	6.758/km²	8	12	Babadaýhan	Ahal province
Bäherden	126,409	16,690	7.574/km²	15	27	Bäherden	Ahal province
Gökdepe	161,819	16,010	10.11/km²	16	45	Gökdepe	Ahal province
Kaka	83,708	7,541	11.10/km²	10	20	Kaka	Ahal province
Sarahs	80,643	5,696	14.16/km²	11	20	Sarahs	Ahal province
Tejen	152,699	7,558	20.20/km²	17	30	Tejen	Ahal province
Gorjaw	0			0	0		**Arkadag**
Kärizek	567			1	0		**Arkadag**
Bagtyýarlyk	309,619	271.6	1,140/km²	0	0		Aşgabat
Berkararlyk	266,425	70.92	3,757/km²	0	0		Aşgabat
Büzmeýin	175,179	449.1	390.1/km²	0	0		Aşgabat
Köpetdag	278,840	187.7	1,486/km²	0	0		Aşgabat
**Balkanabat**	188,429	11,290	16.69/km	6	5	Balkanabat	Balkan province
Bereket	39,282	22,110	1.777/km²	5	22	Bereket	Balkan province
Esenguly	45,436	9,801	4.636/km²	8	13	Esenguly	Balkan province
Etrek	23,747	10,680	2.224/km²	5	6	Etrek	Balkan province
Gyzylarbat	72,473	9,852	7.356/km²	9	25	Gyzylarbat	Balkan province
Magtymguly	34,664	4,136	8.381/km²	8	23	Magtymguly	Balkan province
**Türkmenbaşy**	91 745	167.4	548.1/km²	1	0	Türkmenbaşy	Balkan province
Türkmenbaşy	34,119	65,550	0.5205/km²	8	20	Türkmenbaşy şäherçesi	Balkan province
Akdepe	130,681	2,326	56.18/km²	14	49	Akdepe	Daşoguz province
Boldumsaz	102,435	564.05	181.6/km²	9	36	Boldumsaz	Daşoguz province
**Daşoguz**	201,142	160.6	1,252/km²	1	0	Daşoguz	Daşoguz province
Garaşsyzlyk	210,249	8,944	23.51/km²	13	67	Andalyp	Daşoguz province
Görogly	164,894	14,800	11.14/km²	15	73	Görogly	Daşoguz province
Gubadag	155,061	668.95	231,8/km²	15	67	Gubadag	Daşoguz province
Köneürgenç	176,784	1,318	134.1/km²	17	72	Köneürgenç	Daşoguz province
Ruhubelent	28,172	17,820	1.581/km²	10	42	Ruhubelent	Daşoguz province
Saparmyrat Türkmenbaşy	162,861	19,740	8.250/km²	27	111	Saparmyrat Türkmenbaşy	Daşoguz province
Şabat	218,075	7,179	30.38/km²	16	77	Şabat	Daşoguz province
Çärjew	154,397	26,525	5.820/km²	12	92	Çärjew	Lebap Province
Dänew	159,634	6,089	26.22/km²	18	61	Dänew	Lebap Province
Darganata	57,952	14,890	3.892/km²	8	9	Darganata	Lebap Province
Döwletli	104,864	4,043	25.94/km²	13	41	Döwletli	Lebap Province
Farap	79,302	3,964	20.005/km²	9	32	Farap	Lebap Province
Garabekewül	60,403	4,989	12.11/km²	11	30	Garabekewül	Lebap Province
Halaç	133,909	1,800	74.39/km²	10	31	Halaç	Lebap Province
Hojambaz	82,809	5,770	14.35/km²	9	29	Hojambaz	Lebap Province
Kerki	132,562	17,550	7.553/km²	10	29	Kerki	Lebap Province
Köýtendag	122,523	4,789	25.58/km²	15	29	Köýtendag	Lebap Province
Saýat	128,082	5,901	21.705/km²	20	47	Saýat	Lebap Province
**Türkmenabat**	230,861	158.5	1,457/km²	1	0	Türkmenabat	Lebap Province
**Baýramaly**	70,376	28.94	2,432/km²	1	0	Baýramaly	Mary Province
Baýramaly	170,462	10,390	16.41/km²	17	23	Mekan	Mary Province
Garagum	62,218	2,452	25.37/km²	8	18	Ýagtyýol	Mary Province
**Mary**	167,027	83.04	2,011/km²	1	0	Mary	Mary Province
Mary	173,140	1,352	128.1/km²	18	28	Saparmyrat Türkmenbaşy	Mary Province
Murgap	174,177	5,637	30.90/km²	17	32	Murgap	Mary Province
Oguzhan	32,950	2,044	16.12/km²	10	10	Parahat	Mary Province
Sakarçäge	176,394	9,828	17.95/km²	18	29	Sakarçäge	Mary Province
Tagtabazar	134,751	28,190	4.780/km²	17	29	Tagtabazar	Mary Province
Türkmengala	124,642	9,112	13.68/km²	14	41	Türkmengala	Mary Province
Wekilbazar	168,734	9,430	17.89/km²	16	33	Mollanepes	Mary Province
Ýolöten	155,616	8,677	17.93/km²	18	46	Ýolöten	Mary Province
Awaza				0	0		**Türkmenbaşy**

== List of districts for each province ==
=== Aşgabat ===
See also Map of the Boroughs of Ashgabat

As of January 5, 2018, Ashgabat includes four boroughs (uly etraplar):

Name	Population (2022)	Area (km²)	Density	Number of towns, cities and rural councils	Number of villages	Administrative division
Bagtyýarlyk	309,619	271.6	1,140/km²	0	0	Aşgabat
Berkararlyk	266,425	70.92	3,757/km²	0	0	Aşgabat
Büzmeýin	175,179	449.1	390.1/km²	0	0	Aşgabat
Köpetdag	278,840	187.7	1,486/km²	0	0	Aşgabat

=== Ahal province ===
Name	Population (2022)	Area (km²)	Density	Number of towns, cities and rural councils	Number of villages	Capital	Administrative division
Ak bugdaý	144,119	22,370	6.443/km²	17	76	Änew	Ahal province
Altyn asyr	39,569	6,058	6.532/km²	7	13	Altyn asyr	Ahal province
Arkadag	567	47.53	11.93/km²	2	0	Arkadag	Ahal province
Babadaýhan	97,312	14,400	6.758/km²	8	12	Babadaýhan	Ahal province
Bäherden	126,409	16,690	7.574/km²	15	27	Bäherden	Ahal province
Gökdepe	161,819	16,010	10.11/km²	16	45	Gökdepe	Ahal province
Kaka	83,708	7,541	11.10/km²	10	20	Kaka	Ahal province
Sarahs	80,643	5,696	14.16/km²	11	20	Sarahs	Ahal province
Tejen	152,699	7,558	20.20/km²	17	30	Tejen	Ahal province
Gorjaw	0			0	0		Arkadag
Kärizek	567			1	0		Arkadag

=== Balkan province ===
Name	Population (2022)	Area (km²)	Density	Number of towns, cities and rural councils	Number of villages	Capital	Administrative division
Balkanabat	188,429	11,290	16.69/km	6	5	Balkanabat	Balkan province
Bereket	39,282	22,110	1.777/km²	5	22	Bereket	Balkan province
Esenguly	45,436	9,801	4.636/km²	8	13	Esenguly	Balkan province
Etrek	23,747	10,680	2.224/km²	5	6	Etrek	Balkan province
Gyzylarbat	72,473	9,852	7.356/km²	9	25	Gyzylarbat	Balkan province
Magtymguly	34,664	4,136	8.381/km²	8	23	Magtymguly	Balkan province
Türkmenbaşy	91 745	167.4	548.1/km²	1	0	Türkmenbaşy	Balkan province
Türkmenbaşy	34,119	65,550	0.5205/km²	8	20	Türkmenbaşy şäherçesi	Balkan province
Awaza				0	0		Türkmenbaşy

=== Daşoguz province ===
Name	Population (2022)	Area (km²)	Density	Number of towns, cities and rural councils	Number of villages	Capital	Administrative division
Akdepe	130,681	2,326	56.18/km²	14	49	Akdepe	Daşoguz province
Boldumsaz	102,435	564.05	181.6/km²	9	36	Boldumsaz	Daşoguz province
Daşoguz	201,142	160.6	1,252/km²	1	0	Daşoguz	Daşoguz province
Garaşsyzlyk	210,249	8,944	23.51/km²	13	67	Andalyp	Daşoguz province
Görogly	164,894	14,800	11.14/km²	15	73	Görogly	Daşoguz province
Gubadag	155,061	668.95	231,8/km²	15	67	Gubadag	Daşoguz province
Köneürgenç	176,784	1,318	134.1/km²	17	72	Köneürgenç	Daşoguz province
Ruhubelent	28,172	17,820	1.581/km²	10	42	Ruhubelent	Daşoguz province
Saparmyrat Türkmenbaşy	162,861	19,740	8.250/km²	27	111	Saparmyrat Türkmenbaşy	Daşoguz province
Şabat	218,075	7,179	30.38/km²	16	77	Şabat	Daşoguz province

=== Lebap province ===
Name	Population (2022)	Area (km²)	Density	Number of towns, cities and rural councils	Number of villages	Capital	Administrative division
Çärjew	154,397	26,525	5.820/km²	12	92	Çärjew	Lebap Province
Dänew	159,634	6,089	26.22/km²	18	61	Dänew	Lebap Province
Darganata	57,952	14,890	3.892/km²	8	9	Darganata	Lebap Province
Döwletli	104,864	4,043	25.94/km²	13	41	Döwletli	Lebap Province
Farap	79,302	3,964	20.005/km²	9	32	Farap	Lebap Province
Garabekewül	60,403	4,989	12.11/km²	11	30	Garabekewül	Lebap Province
Halaç	133,909	1,800	74.39/km²	10	31	Halaç	Lebap Province
Hojambaz	82,809	5,770	14.35/km²	9	29	Hojambaz	Lebap Province
Kerki	132,562	17,550	7.553/km²	10	29	Kerki	Lebap Province
Köýtendag	122,523	4,789	25.58/km²	15	29	Köýtendag	Lebap Province
Saýat	128,082	5,901	21.705/km²	20	47	Saýat	Lebap Province
Türkmenabat	230,861	158.5	1,457/km²	1	0	Türkmenabat	Lebap Province

=== Mary province ===
Name	Population (2022)	Area (km²)	Density	Number of towns, cities and rural councils	Number of villages	Capital	Administrative division
Baýramaly	70,376	28.94	2,432/km²	1	0	Baýramaly	Mary Province
Baýramaly	170,462	10,390	16.41/km²	17	23	Mekan	Mary Province
Garagum	62,218	2,452	25.37/km²	8	18	Ýagtyýol	Mary Province
Mary	167,027	83.04	2,011/km²	1	0	Mary	Mary Province
Mary	173,140	1,352	128.1/km²	18	28	Saparmyrat Türkmenbaşy	Mary Province
Murgap	174,177	5,637	30.90/km²	17	32	Murgap	Mary Province
Oguzhan	35,849	2,044	17.54/km²	11	12	Parahat	Mary Province
Sakarçäge	176,394	9,828	17.95/km²	18	29	Sakarçäge	Mary Province
Tagtabazar	134,751	28,190	4.780/km²	17	29	Tagtabazar	Mary Province
Türkmengala	124,642	9,112	13.68/km²	14	41	Türkmengala	Mary Province
Wekilbazar	168,734	9,430	17.89/km²	16	33	Mollanepes	Mary Province
Ýolöten	155,616	8,677	17.93/km²	18	46	Ýolöten	Mary Province

== Abolished districts ==
Here is a list districts abolished at some point:

- Altyn asyr District - Abolished on January 5, 2018, then reestablished on September 19, 2025.
- Archabil District
- Beýik Türkmenbaşy District
- Çandybil District
- Derweze District
- Döwletli District - Abolished on November 9, 2022, then reestablished on September 19, 2025.
- Farap District - Abolished on November 9, 2022, then reestablished on September 19, 2025.
- Garabekewül District - Abolished on November 25, 2017, then reestablished on September 19, 2025.
- Gubadag District - Abolished on November 9, 2022, then reestablished on September 19, 2025.
- Gurbansoltan Eje District - Abolished on November 9, 2022, then reestablished on September 19, 2025, with the name of Garaşsyzlyk.
- Kenar District (Türkmenbaşy City)
- Magdanly District
- Oguzhan District - Abolished on November 9, 2022, then reestablished on September 19, 2025.
- Ruhabat District
- Sakar District
- Serhetabat District

== See also ==
- Regions of Turkmenistan
- OpenStreetMap Wiki: Districts in Turkmenistan
