= Regions of Turkmenistan =

Capital city and Regions of Turkmenistan
- Also known as: Province
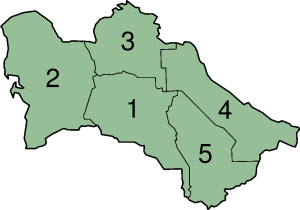
- Category: Unitary state
- Location: Turkmenistan
- Number: 5 Regions; 1 Capital city
- Populations: (Regions only): 569,100 (Balkan) - 1,519,000 (Mary)
- Areas: (Regions only): 139,270 km^{2} (53,772 sq mi) (Balkan) – 97,160 km^{2} (37,513 sq mi) (Ahal)
- Government: Region government, Government of Turkmenistan
- Subdivisions: District

Turkmenistan is divided into five regions (welaýat) and one capital city (şäher) with provincial legal status. They are Ahal, Balkan, Dashoguz, Lebap and Mary, plus the capital city of Ashgabat. Each province is divided into districts. As of 20 December 2022 there were 37 districts (etraplar), 49 cities (şäherler), including 7 cities with district status (etrap hukukly), 68 towns (şäherçeler), 469 rural councils (geňeşlikler) and 1690 villages (oba ilatly ýerler) in Turkmenistan.

The regions are also translated as oblasts, which were also the administrative divisions of the Turkmen Soviet Socialist Republic, a republic of the Soviet Union, which retained the system after independence in 1991.

== Capital city ==
The capital city of Turkmenistan is Ashgabat, which is an administrative and territorial unit with provincial authorities.

See also Map of the Boroughs of Ashgabat

As of January 5, 2018, Ashgabat includes four boroughs (uly etraplar), each with a presidentially appointed mayor (Turkmen: häkim):

1. Bagtyýarlyk etraby (formerly President Niyazov, Lenin District, expanded to include former Ruhabat District plus new territory)
2. Berkararlyk etraby (formerly Azatlyk, Sovetskiy District)
3. Büzmeýin etraby (formerly Abadan District, expanded to include former Arçabil and Çandybil Districts)
4. Köpetdag etraby (formerly Proletarskiy District)

This is a reduction from the previous number of boroughs. Arçabil and Çandybil boroughs were merged on February 4, 2015, and the new etrap, named Arçabil, was in turn renamed Büzmeýin in January 2018. At that time the Abadan borough of Ashgabat, created in 2013 by annexing the town of Abadan and surrounding villages to Abadan's south, was abolished and its territory was merged into the newly renamed Büzmeýin borough. The former Ruhabat borough was abolished at the same time and its territory absorbed by Bagtyýarlyk borough.

On 15 June 2020, Turkmen President Gurbanguly Berdimuhamedow announced intention to create a fifth borough of Ashgabat, to be called Altyn etraby, centered on the new resort zone created on the shores of the former Gurtly Water Reservoir, recently renamed "Golden Lake" (Altyn köl).

== List of regions ==
Overview of regions of Turkmenistan
| Division | ISO 3166-2 | Capital city | Governor | Area | Pop (2022) | Key | Map |
|---|---|---|---|---|---|---|---|
| Ashgabat | TM-S | Ashgabat | Yaztagan Gylyjov | 260 km^{2} (100 sq mi) | 1,030,063 | not on map | |
| Ahal Region | TM-A | Arkadag | Yazmuhammet Gurbanov | 97,260 km^{2} (37,550 sq mi) | 886,845 | 1 | |
| Balkan Region | TM-B | Balkanabat | Tangryguly Atahallyev | 139,300 km^{2} (53,800 sq mi) | 529,895 | 2 | |
| Daşoguz Region | TM-D | Dashoguz | Nazarmyrat Nazarmyradov | 73,400 km^{2} (28,300 sq mi) | 1,550,354 | 3 | |
| Lebap Region | TM-L | Turkmenabat | Shohrat Amangeldiyev | 93,700 km^{2} (36,200 sq mi) | 1,447,298 | 4 | |
| Mary Region | TM-M | Mary | Dovranberdi Annaberdiyev | 87,200 km^{2} (33,700 sq mi) | 1,613,386 | 5 | |

The heads of the regions (Turkmen: häkim, "the leader"), sometimes known as "governors", are appointed by the President of Turkmenistan (Constitution of Turkmenistan, Articles 80–81).

== See also ==
- Districts of Turkmenistan
- ISO 3166-2:TM
