= List of municipalities in Mary Province =

Map of the five provinces of Turkmenistan. Mary is highlighted in red.

This article is referencing as a list all lawfully recognized municipalities of Mary Province, Turkmenistan. Since November 9, 2022, there are 343 municipalities in Mary, including two cities with district status, 6 cities, 14 towns, and 321 villages.

In Turkmenistan, any administrative division, including municipalities, is designated by law and may be changed by decree by the Assembly of Turkmenistan, as stated by the 23rd article of the constitution. They all are referenced in a list rarely shared by the Turkmen government, yet available for consultation through the 2022 census.

Criticized by external observers, the census figures should be taken very carefully as they seem to overestimate the actual population of the country.

== Lists ==
Municipalities listed here are sorted by their administrative division, then by alphabetical order.

=== Cities ===
Cities with district status are bolded.

Name	Population (2022)	District
**Baýramaly**	70,376	**Baýramaly**
**Mary**	167,027	**Mary**
Murgap	14,822	Murgap
Şatlyk	7,725	Oguzhan
Sakarçäge	11,891	Sakarçäge
Serhetabat	16,038	Tagtabazar
Türkmengala	16,696	Türkmengala
Ýolöten	30,709	Ýolöten

=== Towns ===
Name	Population (2022)	District
Bagtyýarlyk	1,727	Baýramaly
Berkarar	1,408	Baýramaly
Mekan	12,115	Baýramaly
Ýagtyýol	10,488	Garagum
Peşanaly	935	Mary
Saparmyrat Türkmenbaşy	13,251	Mary
Deňizhan	4,686	Oguzhan
Döwletli zaman	982	Oguzhan
Oguzhan	6,430	Oguzhan
Parahat	2,494	Oguzhan
Tagtabazar	13,312	Tagtabazar
Zähmet	3,855	Türkmengala
Mollanepes	2,878	Wekilbazar
Wekilbazar	2,832	Wekilbazar

=== Villages ===
Villages which hold the seat of their rural council are bolded.

Name	Population (2022)	District	Included in
Daýhan	2,482	Baýramaly	Agaýusup adyndaky geňeşlik
Döwletli	2,067	Baýramaly	Agaýusup adyndaky geňeşlik
**Şöhrat**	4,848	Baýramaly	Agaýusup adyndaky geňeşlik
**Azat**	5,139	Baýramaly	Azat geňeşligi
Dogryýap	4,158	Baýramaly	Azat geňeşligi
Hazarly	949	Baýramaly	Azat geňeşligi
Pagtasaraý	1,645	Baýramaly	Azat geňeşligi
Türkmenistan	1,645	Baýramaly	Azat geňeşligi
**Bagt**	2,929	Baýramaly	Bagt geňeşligi
Çöplidepe	1,607	Baýramaly	Bagt geňeşligi
Kenar	1,156	Baýramaly	Bagt geňeşligi
Täzegüýç	2,799	Baýramaly	Bagt geňeşligi
Baglyoba	1,581	Baýramaly	Bahar geňeşligi
**Bahar**	5,446	Baýramaly	Bahar geňeşligi
**Beýikköpri**	1,179	Baýramaly	Beýikköpri geňeşligi
Depgin	5,028	Baýramaly	Beýikköpri geňeşligi
Düýeçöken	2,867	Baýramaly	Beýikköpri geňeşligi
Kanal	503	Baýramaly	Beýikköpri geňeşligi
Odunçy	686	Baýramaly	Beýikköpri geňeşligi
**Erkana**	3,218	Baýramaly	Erkana geňeşligi
Göksuw	2,340	Baýramaly	Erkana geňeşligi
Çepekýap	1,659	Baýramaly	Gadyrýap geňeşligi
Erikli	1,056	Baýramaly	Gadyrýap geňeşligi
**Gadyrýap**	11,436	Baýramaly	Gadyrýap geňeşligi
Galkynyş	622	Baýramaly	Gadyrýap geňeşligi
**Aryk**	6,610	Baýramaly	Gatakar geňeşligi
Görelde	4,673	Baýramaly	Gatakar geňeşligi
Mülk	908	Baýramaly	Gatakar geňeşligi
Türkmen Goşun	1,968	Baýramaly	Gatakar geňeşligi
Çöpli	1,839	Baýramaly	Guşlyoba geňeşligi
Gurbangala	171	Baýramaly	Guşlyoba geňeşligi
**Guşlyoba**	2,281	Baýramaly	Guşlyoba geňeşligi
Gutlamgala	423	Baýramaly	Guşlyoba geňeşligi
**Garaýörme**	7,670	Baýramaly	Hangala geňeşligi
**Höwesli**	4,822	Baýramaly	Höwesli geňeşligi
Kyrkdepe	1,060	Baýramaly	Höwesli geňeşligi
Garaja	721	Baýramaly	Mekan
Harsaňly	1,897	Baýramaly	Mekan
Gäwürgala	801	Baýramaly	Merw geňeşligi
**Merw**	12,183	Baýramaly	Merw geňeşligi
Birleşik	992	Baýramaly	Murgap geňeşligi
**Murgap**	4,181	Baýramaly	Murgap geňeşligi
Tutly	452	Baýramaly	Murgap geňeşligi
Ylham	3,107	Baýramaly	Murgap geňeşligi
Bereket	3,755	Baýramaly	Ýalkym geňeşligi
Rafsanjani	2,550	Baýramaly	Ýalkym geňeşligi
Şereket	1,894	Baýramaly	Ýalkym geňeşligi
Täzeoba	703	Baýramaly	Ýalkym geňeşligi
Tokaýly	664	Baýramaly	Ýalkym geňeşligi
Uçgun	1,226	Baýramaly	Ýalkym geňeşligi
**Ýalkym**	8,518	Baýramaly	Ýalkym geňeşligi
Ýaýlak	3,475	Baýramaly	Ýalkym geňeşligi
Ýylgynly	1,088	Baýramaly	Ýalkym geňeşligi
Abaýtöş	4,706	Garagum	Akmeýdan geňeşligi
**Akmeýdan**	6,413	Garagum	Akmeýdan geňeşligi
Geçigyran	1,111	Garagum	Akmeýdan geňeşligi
Gurtludepe	3,061	Garagum	Akmeýdan geňeşligi
Kişman	1,433	Garagum	Akmeýdan geňeşligi
Atlyýatan	4,038	Garagum	Durnalyýap geňeşligi
**Türkmenistan**	933	Garagum	Durnalyýap geňeşligi
**Göbekli**	2,741	Garagum	Göbeklidepe geňeşligi
Ýasydepe	3,137	Garagum	Göbeklidepe geňeşligi
**Sähra**	2,673	Garagum	Sähra geňeşligi
Durnaly	1,884	Garagum	Şatlyk geňeşligi
**Şatlyk**	5,828	Garagum	Şatlyk geňeşligi
**Akjadepe**	2,387	Garagum	Tarpýer geňeşligi
Erez	1,666	Garagum	Tarpýer geňeşligi
**Täzeoba**	4,183	Garagum	Täzeoba geňeşligi
Garajadepe	1,904	Garagum	Ýagtyýol
Guýruklydepe	1,991	Garagum	Ýagtyýol
Munan	1,641	Garagum	Ýagtyýol
Akgoňur	7,007	Mary	Abadanlyk geňeşligi
**Garadepe**	11,152	Mary	Abadanlyk geňeşligi
**Arykperreň**	5,782	Mary	Adalat geňeşligi
**Ajap Mämmedowa**	5,274	Mary	Ajap Mämmedowa adyndaky geňeşlik
Gurtzäkir	4,519	Mary	Ajap Mämmedowa adyndaky geňeşlik
Ýaýlagaraahmet	4,926	Mary	Ajap Mämmedowa adyndaky geňeşlik
**Gurama**	9,226	Mary	Ak altyn geňeşligi
Goşaja	1,555	Mary	Akmyrat Hümmedow adyndaky geňeşlik
**Hojaýap**	7,346	Mary	Akmyrat Hümmedow adyndaky geňeşlik
**Akybaý**	12,462	Mary	Akybaý geňeşligi
8-nji Mart	4,504	Mary	Aşgabat geňeşligi
Ata	4,939	Mary	Aşgabat geňeşligi
Egrigüzer	5,602	Mary	Aşgabat geňeşligi
**Gowkyzereň**	5,616	Mary	Aşgabat geňeşligi
**Döwletli**	4,887	Mary	Atabaýew adyndaky geňeşlik
**Babasary**	9,475	Mary	Babasary geňeşligi
Garainjik	3,585	Mary	Diýar geňeşligi
**Kelteler**	4,989	Mary	Diýar geňeşligi
Hanutamyş	2,264	Mary	Jemgyýet geňeşligi
Jemgyýet	2,570	Mary	Jemgyýet geňeşligi
**Müjewür**	4,331	Mary	Jemgyýet geňeşligi
**Mykgy Lorsy**	10,498	Mary	Mykgy Lorsy adyndaky geňeşlik
**Peşanaly**	7,910	Mary	Peşanaly geňeşligi
**Mülksyçmaz**	8,771	Mary	Ruhubelent geňeşligi
Aköýli	301	Mary	Täzegüýç geňeşligi
Söýünaly	1,619	Mary	Täzegüýç geňeşligi
**Täzeoba**	4,031	Mary	Täzegüýç geňeşligi
**Gojuklar**	3,813	Mary	Türkmen ýoly geňeşligi
**Köşk**	6,238	Murgap	Azatlyk geňeşligi
**Çäçdepe**	12,784	Murgap	Çäçdepe geňeşligi
Arygoba	5,888	Murgap	Çöňür geňeşligi
**Çöňür**	3,820	Murgap	Çöňür geňeşligi
Täzeoba	2,897	Murgap	Çöňür geňeşligi
**Çemçedepe**	5,042	Murgap	Galkynyş geňeşligi
**Gatyýap**	5,293	Murgap	Gatyýap geňeşligi
Suhtyýap	2,769	Murgap	Gatyýap geňeşligi
Amaşaýap	5,035	Murgap	Gökdepe geňeşligi
**Gökdepe**	6,767	Murgap	Gökdepe geňeşligi
Akýer	1,870	Murgap	Gowşutbent geňeşligi
Bentlioba	582	Murgap	Gowşutbent geňeşligi
Garaşsyzlyk	1,079	Murgap	Gowşutbent geňeşligi
**Penjiwar**	6,841	Murgap	Gowşutbent geňeşligi
**Gylyçdurdy Sähetmyradow**	8,716	Murgap	Gylyçdurdy Sähetmyradow adyndaky geňeşlik
**Hyrslan Jumaýew**	12,744	Murgap	Hyrslan Jumaýew adyndaky geňeşlik
**Gowkuzereň**	7,064	Murgap	Miras geňeşligi
Gökleň	3,502	Murgap	Mülkýazy geňeşligi
Gülperi	776	Murgap	Mülkýazy geňeşligi
**Mülkýazy**	10,377	Murgap	Mülkýazy geňeşligi
Amaşa	3,863	Murgap	Rowaçlyk geňeşligi
**Rowaçlyk**	3,865	Murgap	Rowaçlyk geňeşligi
Meýletinlik	4,262	Murgap	Şordepe geňeşligi
**Şordepe**	3,942	Murgap	Şordepe geňeşligi
Ýagtylyk	4,752	Murgap	Şordepe geňeşligi
Birleşik	3,750	Murgap	Suhty geňeşligi
Goşaköpri	3,023	Murgap	Suhty geňeşligi
Mülkaman	3,306	Murgap	Suhty geňeşligi
**Suhty**	4,180	Murgap	Suhty geňeşligi
Daşaýak	2,663	Murgap	Watan geňeşligi
**Watan**	6,552	Murgap	Watan geňeşligi
**Gojukkölýap**	5,113	Murgap	Ylham geňeşligi
**Lälezar**	2,752	Oguzhan	Altyn zaman geňeşligi
Kiçi Hanhowuz	40	Oguzhan	Deňizhan
Sähra	135	Oguzhan	Deňizhan
**Deňizhan**	1,851	Oguzhan	Deňizhan geňeşligi
Agzybirlik	539	Oguzhan	Dostluk geňeşligi
**Dostluk**	2,360	Oguzhan	Dostluk geňeşligi
Aýhan	152	Oguzhan	Gökhan geňeşligi
Daghan	484	Oguzhan	Gökhan geňeşligi
**Gökhan**	1,272	Oguzhan	Gökhan geňeşligi
Günhan	499	Oguzhan	Gökhan geňeşligi
**Azatlyk**	1,588	Oguzhan	Merdana geňeşligi
**Ýyldyzhan**	1,860	Oguzhan	Ýyldyzhan geňeşligi
Agzybirlik	5,730	Sakarçäge	Agzybirlik geňeşligi
**Arkadag**	4,574	Sakarçäge	Agzybirlik geňeşligi
**Akýap**	5,920	Sakarçäge	Akýap geňeşligi
Çetili	4,871	Sakarçäge	Akýap geňeşligi
**Bereket**	6,092	Sakarçäge	Bereket geňeşligi
**Çaşgyn**	15,470	Sakarçäge	Çaşgyn geňeşligi
**Çerkezköl**	12,976	Sakarçäge	Çerkezköl geňeşligi
Alajagöz	4,772	Sakarçäge	Daýhan geňeşligi
**Dogryýol**	6,369	Sakarçäge	Daýhan geňeşligi
**Garaýap**	9,852	Sakarçäge	Garaýap geňeşligi
Aýnaköl	3,914	Sakarçäge	Görelde geňeşligi
**Görelde**	4,129	Sakarçäge	Görelde geňeşligi
**Bagşy**	4,777	Sakarçäge	Gorgangala geňeşligi
Gülüstan	5,164	Sakarçäge	Gülüstan geňeşligi
**Hakykat**	4,851	Sakarçäge	Gülüstan geňeşligi
Dörtguýy	62	Sakarçäge	Gumgüzer geňeşligi
Garybata	4,374	Sakarçäge	Gumgüzer geňeşligi
**Gumgüzer**	7,865	Sakarçäge	Gumgüzer geňeşligi
**Böri**	6,242	Sakarçäge	Gyzylgum geňeşligi
Daňatar Sähedow	4,943	Sakarçäge	Gyzylgum geňeşligi
Gyzylgum	3,934	Sakarçäge	Gyzylgum geňeşligi
Mawyteber	4,350	Sakarçäge	Gyzylgum geňeşligi
**Hojadepe**	5,761	Sakarçäge	Hojadepe geňeşligi
**Keseýap**	10,519	Sakarçäge	Keseýap geňeşligi
**Düýedarçylyk**	3,542	Sakarçäge	Sakarçäge geňeşligi
Gökgümmez	153	Sakarçäge	Sakarçäge geňeşligi
Kyrköýli	2,206	Sakarçäge	Soltanyz geňeşligi
**Soltanyz**	2,972	Sakarçäge	Soltanyz geňeşligi
**Söýünsary**	8,119	Sakarçäge	Söýünsary geňeşligi
**Ahal**	2,724	Tagtabazar	Ahal geňeşligi
**Çemenabat**	3,250	Tagtabazar	Çemenabat geňeşligi
**Daşköpri**	2,243	Tagtabazar	Daşköpri geňeşligi
Dostluk	2,134	Tagtabazar	Erden geňeşligi
**Erden**	8,604	Tagtabazar	Erden geňeşligi
**Galaýmor**	4,067	Tagtabazar	Galaýmor geňeşligi
Orazbaba	84	Tagtabazar	Galaýmor geňeşligi
Akgaýa	1,519	Tagtabazar	Gulja geňeşligi
Düldülahyr	3,066	Tagtabazar	Gulja geňeşligi
**Gulja**	6,410	Tagtabazar	Gulja geňeşligi
Gyzyl Gojaly	3,813	Tagtabazar	Gulja geňeşligi
Başbedeň	2,230	Tagtabazar	Marçak geňeşligi
**Durdyýew**	8,682	Tagtabazar	Marçak geňeşligi
Gojaly	2,805	Tagtabazar	Marçak geňeşligi
**Suhty**	9,865	Tagtabazar	Pendi geňeşligi
Zähmetkeş	1,603	Tagtabazar	Pendi geňeşligi
27-nji oktýabr	938	Tagtabazar	Sandykgaçy geňeşligi
Bagçylyk	1,743	Tagtabazar	Sandykgaçy geňeşligi
**Sandykgaçy**	4,488	Tagtabazar	Sandykgaçy geňeşligi
**Baýraç**	8,658	Tagtabazar	Saparmyrat Nyýazow adyndaky geňeşlik
**Saryýazy**	5,204	Tagtabazar	Saryýazy geňeşligi
Akrabat	35	Tagtabazar	Serhetçi geňeşligi
Parahat	459	Tagtabazar	Serhetçi geňeşligi
**Serhetçi**	3,372	Tagtabazar	Serhetçi geňeşligi
Bedeň	3,851	Tagtabazar	Söýünaly geňeşligi
**Söýünaly**	4,972	Tagtabazar	Söýünaly geňeşligi
Üzümli	535	Tagtabazar	Üzümçilik geňeşligi
**Ýaşlyk**	5,725	Tagtabazar	Üzümçilik geňeşligi
**Ýeňiş**	2,322	Tagtabazar	Ýeňiş geňeşligi
Dörttamly	836	Türkmengala	Gatlaly geňeşligi
**Gatlaly**	1,883	Türkmengala	Gatlaly geňeşligi
Gümmezli	1,385	Türkmengala	Gatlaly geňeşligi
**Hasyl**	3,786	Türkmengala	Hasyl geňeşligi
Agzygara	4,019	Türkmengala	Kemine geňeşligi
Döwlet	2,477	Türkmengala	Kemine geňeşligi
**Kemine**	8,477	Türkmengala	Kemine geňeşligi
Mürzeçäge	1,818	Türkmengala	Kemine geňeşligi
**Amaşaýap**	2,105	Türkmengala	Magtymguly adyndaky geňeşlik
Ikinjibent	204	Türkmengala	Magtymguly adyndaky geňeşlik
Seýidoba	1,242	Türkmengala	Magtymguly adyndaky geňeşlik
Ýaboba	3,051	Türkmengala	Magtymguly adyndaky geňeşlik
Burkaz	133	Türkmengala	Rehnet geňeşligi
Çowdur	4,005	Türkmengala	Rehnet geňeşligi
**Erkana**	3,466	Türkmengala	Rehnet geňeşligi
Goşgyzyl	172	Türkmengala	Rehnet geňeşligi
Tutluk	1,152	Türkmengala	Rehnet geňeşligi
Üçünjibent	183	Türkmengala	Rehnet geňeşligi
Ýalkym	1,634	Türkmengala	Rehnet geňeşligi
Babakese	471	Türkmengala	Serdarýap geňeşligi
**Rahat**	8,421	Türkmengala	Serdarýap geňeşligi
Ruhubelent	277	Türkmengala	Serdarýap geňeşligi
Serdarýap	1,621	Türkmengala	Serdarýap geňeşligi
**Ärsary**	3,660	Türkmengala	Seýitnazar Seýdi adyndaky geňeşlik
Garamüňňüş	2,765	Türkmengala	Seýitnazar Seýdi adyndaky geňeşlik
Kyrkalaň	488	Türkmengala	Soltanýap geňeşligi
**Ýyldyz**	5,108	Türkmengala	Soltanýap geňeşligi
**Çaňlybent**	5,089	Türkmengala	Täzedaýhan geňeşligi
Hindiguş	1,226	Türkmengala	Täzedaýhan geňeşligi
Kyrkişik	5,282	Türkmengala	Täzedünýä geňeşligi
**Ýagty**	6,077	Türkmengala	Täzedünýä geňeşligi
Ýaşlar	342	Türkmengala	Täzedünýä geňeşligi
Aryklar	1,756	Türkmengala	Täzeýol geňeşligi
Birleşik	871	Türkmengala	Täzeýol geňeşligi
Gumly	894	Türkmengala	Täzeýol geňeşligi
**Haryn**	4,259	Türkmengala	Täzeýol geňeşligi
Bäşinjibent	541	Türkmengala	Zähmet
Zähmet bekedi	5,356	Türkmengala	Zähmet
Buluçlyk	2,856	Türkmengala	Zähmet geňeşligi
**Kälçe**	3,655	Türkmengala	Zähmet geňeşligi
Kiçikälçe	1,048	Türkmengala	Zähmet geňeşligi
Akgoňur	4,861	Wekilbazar	Akgoňur geňeşligi
**Goňur**	4,950	Wekilbazar	Akgoňur geňeşligi
Narlyoba	3,824	Wekilbazar	Akgoňur geňeşligi
Ýagtylyk	4,647	Wekilbazar	Akgoňur geňeşligi
**Watan**	10,660	Wekilbazar	Alladurdy Gandymow adyndaky geňeşlik
Aýgyt	2,243	Wekilbazar	Çarlakýap geňeşligi
**Çarlakýap**	4,877	Wekilbazar	Çarlakýap geňeşligi
Diňli	2,477	Wekilbazar	Çarlakýap geňeşligi
Bent	208	Wekilbazar	Egrigüzer geňeşligi
**Egrigüzer**	10,557	Wekilbazar	Egrigüzer geňeşligi
**Arzuw**	5,341	Wekilbazar	Gökje geňeşligi
Bagşy	2,361	Wekilbazar	Gökje geňeşligi
Garagökje	5,431	Wekilbazar	Gökje geňeşligi
**Garagoňur**	6,331	Wekilbazar	Goňur geňeşligi
Nurana	3,555	Wekilbazar	Goňur geňeşligi
**Halyl**	7,414	Wekilbazar	Halyl geňeşligi
Çebisgen	240	Wekilbazar	Jumadurdy Atajanow adyndaky geňeşlik
Garajaköw	3,316	Wekilbazar	Jumadurdy Atajanow adyndaky geňeşlik
Haşyrdyk	8,443	Wekilbazar	Jumadurdy Atajanow adyndaky geňeşlik
Işçi	2,619	Wekilbazar	Jumadurdy Atajanow adyndaky geňeşlik
**Jumadurdy Atajanow**	8,287	Wekilbazar	Jumadurdy Atajanow adyndaky geňeşlik
Üçdepe	1,306	Wekilbazar	Mollanepes
**Gara**	10,901	Wekilbazar	Mollanepes adyndaky geňeşlik
Kümüşçi	845	Wekilbazar	Mülkamaşa geňeşligi
**Magtymguly**	9,098	Wekilbazar	Mülkamaşa geňeşligi
**Mülkbükri**	10,899	Wekilbazar	Mülkbükri geňeşligi
Kaklydepe	2,760	Wekilbazar	Mülkýusup geňeşligi
**Mülkýusup**	3,188	Wekilbazar	Mülkýusup geňeşligi
Parahatlyk	4,100	Wekilbazar	Mülkýusup geňeşligi
Göreş	3,066	Wekilbazar	Rysgally geňeşligi
**Türkmenistan**	6,778	Wekilbazar	Rysgally geňeşligi
Döwletli	2,889	Wekilbazar	Täzedurmuş geňeşligi
**Täzedurmuş**	4,552	Wekilbazar	Täzedurmuş geňeşligi
**Agzybirlik**	4,542	Ýolöten	Agzybirlik geňeşligi
Söýünalybedeň	4,774	Ýolöten	Agzybirlik geňeşligi
Täzeýap	1,326	Ýolöten	Agzybirlik geňeşligi
Alamdepe	990	Ýolöten	Ahunbaba geňeşligi
Bagtyýarlyk	3,373	Ýolöten	Ahunbaba geňeşligi
Tokaýçy	1,920	Ýolöten	Ahunbaba geňeşligi
**Zindigani**	6,175	Ýolöten	Ahunbaba geňeşligi
**Akgüzer**	2,926	Ýolöten	Akgüzer geňeşligi
Bozýatan	1 889	Ýolöten	Akgüzer geňeşligi
Lälezar	1,336	Ýolöten	Akgüzer geňeşligi
**Azatlyk**	2,490	Ýolöten	Arkadag geňeşligi
Galkynyş	2,904	Ýolöten	Baýraç geňeşligi
**Janybek**	4,574	Ýolöten	Baýraç geňeşligi
Ýerki	1,490	Ýolöten	Baýraç geňeşligi
**Döwletli**	3,533	Ýolöten	Döwletli geňeşligi
**Garaköl**	2,474	Ýolöten	Garaköl geňeşligi
Gazyklybent	1,030	Ýolöten	Garaköl geňeşligi
Gammarbaba	4,254	Ýolöten	Gammarbaba geňeşligi
Gammarýap	2,425	Ýolöten	Gammarbaba geňeşligi
**Ýeňiş**	4,074	Ýolöten	Gammarbaba geňeşligi
Gadyr	2,338	Ýolöten	Goýunjy geňeşligi
**Goýunjy**	4,197	Ýolöten	Goýunjy geňeşligi
**Hakykat**	7,833	Ýolöten	Hakykat geňeşligi
Bereket	1,080	Ýolöten	Hüjüm geňeşligi
**Hüjüm**	4,034	Ýolöten	Hüjüm geňeşligi
**Momataý**	3,323	Ýolöten	Momataý geňeşligi
Talhatanbaba	2,670	Ýolöten	Momataý geňeşligi
Üçköpri	883	Ýolöten	Momataý geňeşligi
Alnyş	1,539	Ýolöten	Rahat geňeşligi
**Awçy**	2,317	Ýolöten	Rahat geňeşligi
Gulanly	852	Ýolöten	Rahat geňeşligi
Rahatýap	1,588	Ýolöten	Rahat geňeşligi
**Şöhrat**	3,876	Ýolöten	Şöhrat geňeşligi
Daýhanbent	499	Ýolöten	Soltanbent geňeşligi
**Dostluk**	6,767	Ýolöten	Soltanbent geňeşligi
Hojaköw	619	Ýolöten	Soltanbent geňeşligi
Şark	2,100	Ýolöten	Soltanbent geňeşligi
Soltanbent	2,290	Ýolöten	Soltanbent geňeşligi
Täzeýer	296	Ýolöten	Soltanbent geňeşligi
Nyýazow	1,208	Ýolöten	Ymambaba geňeşligi
**Ymambaba**	5,224	Ýolöten	Ymambaba geňeşligi
Altyn toprak	432	Ýolöten	Ýokary Suhty geňeşligi
Atçapar	1,883	Ýolöten	Ýokary Suhty geňeşligi
Gojaly	2,322	Ýolöten	Ýokary Suhty geňeşligi
Taňrygazan	2,549	Ýolöten	Ýokary Suhty geňeşligi
**Ýokary Suhty**	3,689	Ýolöten	Ýokary Suhty geňeşligi

== Former settlements ==
This list is sorted by alphabetical order only.

Name	Type	Included in	End date	Current status
Ajyguýy	Village	Döwletli geňeşligi	15 August 2009	
Altyn sähra	Village	Altyn sähra geňeşligi	1st August 2016	
Amanýap	Village	Gatyýap geňeşligi	1st August 2016	
Ärsaryoba	Village	Täzedünýä geňeşligi	1st August 2016	Merged into Kyrkişik
Balçylyk	Village	Balçylyk geňeşligi	1st August 2016	Merged into Baýramaly
Bäşýyllyk	Village	Agzybirlik geňeşligi	1st August 2016	Merged into Gulja
Çotan	Village	Mollanepes geňeşligi	1st August 2016	Merged into Gara
Daşköpri bekedi	Village	Daşköpri geňeşligi	1st August 2016	Merged into Daşköpri
Daýhan	Village	Berkarar geňeşligi	1st August 2016	Merged into Türkmengala
Galkynyş	Village	Zähmet geňeşligi	1st August 2016	Merged into Zähmet bekedi
Garaboragan	Village	Baýraç geňeşligi	9 November 2022	Merged into Janybek
Garagum	Village	Mülkbagşy geňeşligi	1st August 2016	Merged into Mary
Gazagoba	Village	Deňizhan	10 May 2010	
Gazagoba	Village	Gatyýap geňeşligi	1st August 2016	
Gökje	Village	Gökje geňeşligi	1st August 2016	Merged into Mary
Goýunly	Village	Galaýmor geňeşligi	1st August 2016	
Guljar	Village	Garaşsyzlyk geňeşligi	15 August 2009	
Gylyççinnek	Village	Döwletli geňeşligi	15 August 2009	
Gyzyl	Village	Soltanbent geňeşligi	9 November 2022	Merged into Soltanbent
Gyzylýap	Village	Hakykat geňeşligi	9 November 2022	Merged into Hakykat
Hajysopy	Village	Akýap geňeşligi	1st August 2016	Merged into Sakarçäge
Hopbuk	Village	Galaýmor geňeşligi	1st August 2016	
Iňrik	Village	Hasyl geňeşligi	1st August 2016	Merged into Hasyl
Işeňňir	Village	Seýitnazar Seýdi adyndaky geňeşlik	1st August 2016	Merged into Ärsary
Jar	Village	Ak altyn geňeşligi	1st August 2016	Merged into Peşanaly
Jarly	Village	Berkarar geňeşligi	1st August 2016	Merged into Türkmengala
Jürre	Village	Garaköl geňeşligi	1st August 2016	
Jykyrýer	Village	Mülkbagşy geňeşligi	1st August 2016	Merged into Mary
Kerpiçli	Village	Mülkbagşy geňeşligi	1st August 2016	Merged into Mary
Lälezar	Village	Lälezar geňeşligi	1st August 2016	
Massur	Village	Milli Goşun geňeşligi	1st August 2016	Merged into Mawyteber
Merjenliperreň	Village	Mülkbagşy geňeşligi	1st August 2016	Merged into Mary
Minara	Village	Dostluk geňeşligi	15 August 2009	
Muhadow	Village	Muhadow adyndaky geňeşligi	1st August 2016	Merged into Mary
Mülkbagşy	Village	Mülkbagşy geňeşligi	1st August 2016	Merged into Mary
Nahalçy	Village	Balçylyk geňeşligi	1st August 2016	Merged into Baýramaly
Perreňçäge	Village	Gökje geňeşligi	1st August 2016	Merged into Mary
Pökgen	Village	Gökje geňeşligi	1st August 2016	Merged into Mary
Pürmetýap	Village	Görelde geňeşligi	1st August 2016	Merged into Görelde
Ruhnama	Village	Ruhnama geňeşligi	1st August 2016	
S.Türkmenbaşy adyndaky demir ýol stansiýasy	Village	Parahat	10 May 2010	
Sarygoba	Village	Soltanýap geňeşligi	9 November 2022	Merged into Ýyldyz
Şaýlydepe	Village	Gatlaly geňeşligi	1st August 2016	Merged into Türkmengala
Serhetli	Village	Serhetçi geňeşligi	1st August 2016	Merged into Serhetçi
Sytdyh	Village	Baýraç geňeşligi	9 November 2022	Merged into Janybek
Täzebirleşik	Village	Kemine adyndaky geňeşligi	9 November 2022	Merged into Kemine
Täzedaýhan	Village	Soltanbent geňeşligi	9 November 2022	Merged into Dostluk
Täzeguýy	Village	Çemenabat geňeşligi	1st August 2016	
Turatoba	Village	Azatlyk geňeşligi	1st August 2016	Merged into Murgap
Ýaňyguýy	Village	Serdarýap geňeşligi	1st August 2016	
Ýasman	Village	Gorgangala geňeşligi	1st August 2016	Merged into Bagşy
Ýazygaragoňur	Village	Peşanaly geňeşligi	10 May 2010	
Zäkir	Village	Hojadepe geňeşligi	1st August 2016	Merged into Hojadepe

== See also ==
- Demographics of Turkmenistan
- Cities of Turkmenistan
- Towns of Turkmenistan
- List of cities, towns and villages in Turkmenistan
