= Cities of Turkmenistan =

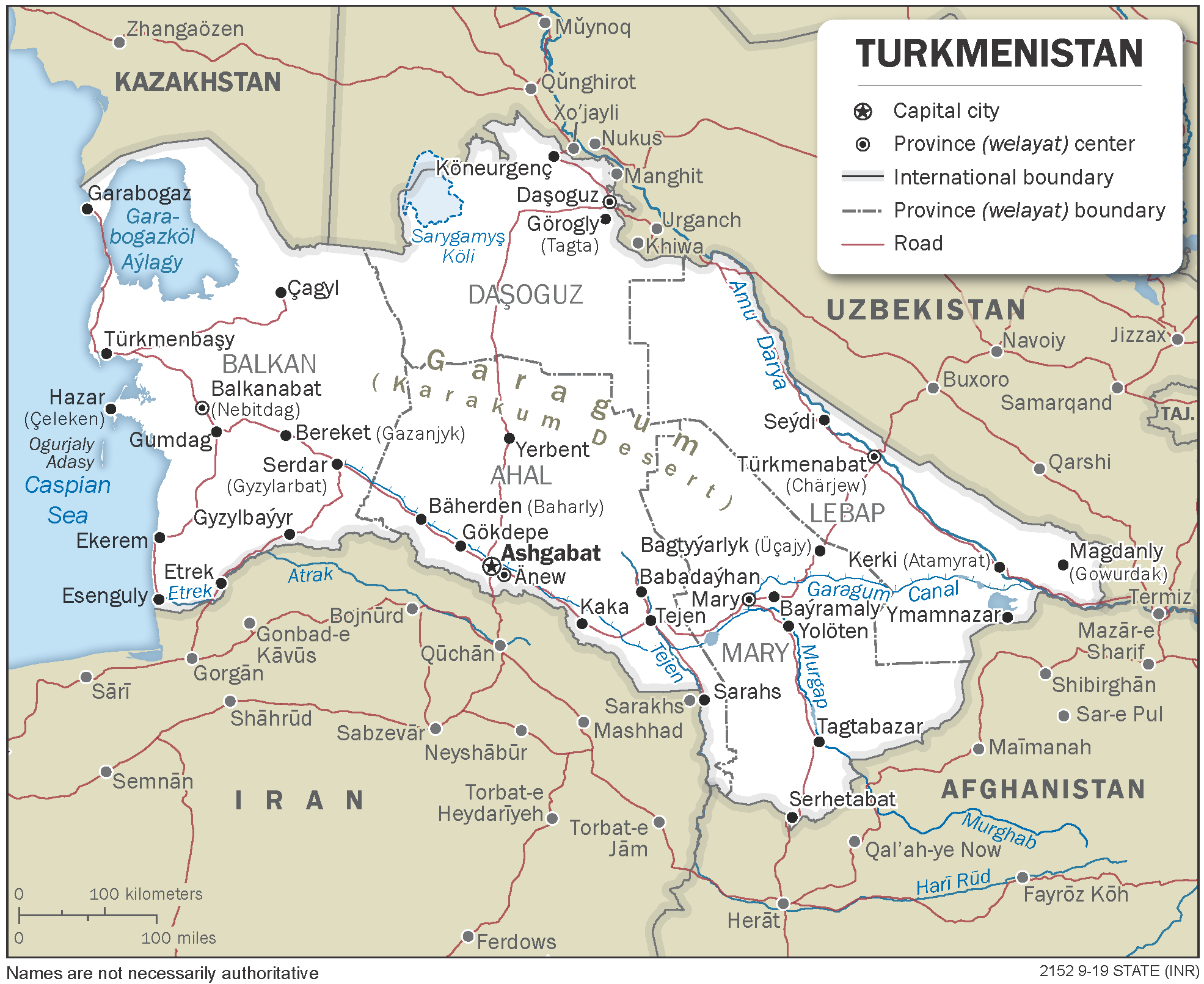
Map of Turkmenistan

A şäher, translated as "city," is the most important form of third-level administrative division of Turkmenistan. In theory, a şäher should be more populated than a şäherçe ("town") or a geňeşlik ("rural councils"). In some cases, a şäher may include towns or villages ("oba" / pl. "obalar") within its boudaries.

In Turkmenistan, municipalities with a city status are established by law. Cities fall into three categories:

- Cities equivalent to a province, a status claimed by Aşgabat only.
- Cities with a district status, "etrap hukukly." Those cities must have a population over 30,000 and fulfill an administrative, an economic or a cultural role within its province. There are 7 of them.
- Cities within a district. Those cities must have a population over 8,000 and possess some of the following actors or structures: Industrial enterprises, construction and transport organizations, utilities, municipally-owned housing stock, socio-cultural institutions, trade and social services. There are 44 of them.

Cities with district status, along with regular districts, are headed by a presidentially appointed häkim, translated as "governor" or "mayor" in the case of a city. Three cities in Turkmenistan, Aşgabat, Arkadag, and Turkmenbaşy, are further subdivided into boroughs with district status, each of them having its own häkim. Cities within a district are subordinated to the district's institutions and are administered jointly. Those cities are headed by a geňeş, an elected council chaired by an arçyn ("elder") who serves as both chairman and mayor.

== List ==
=== Municipalities designated as cities ===
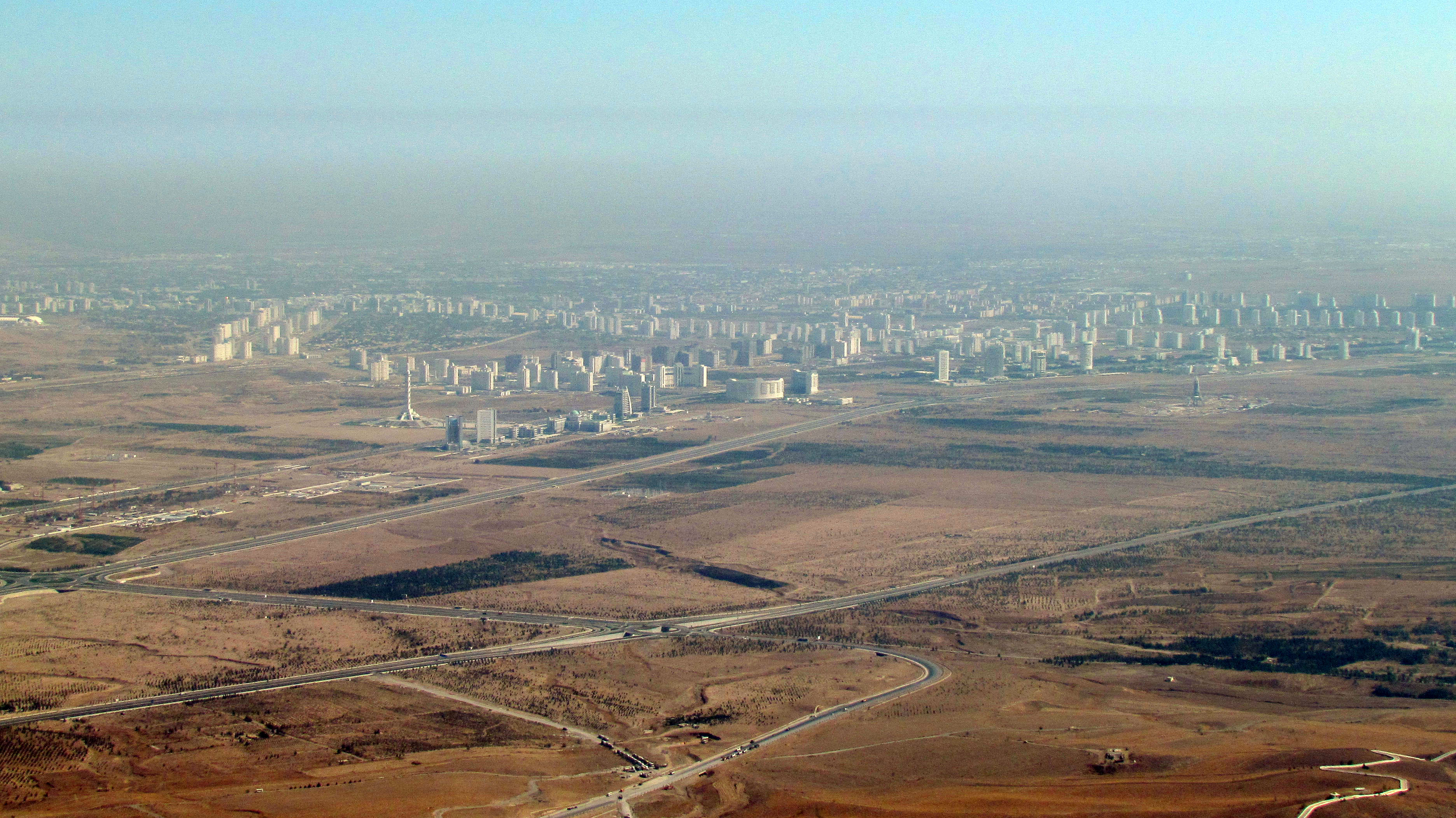
Ashgabat, capital of Turkmenistan.

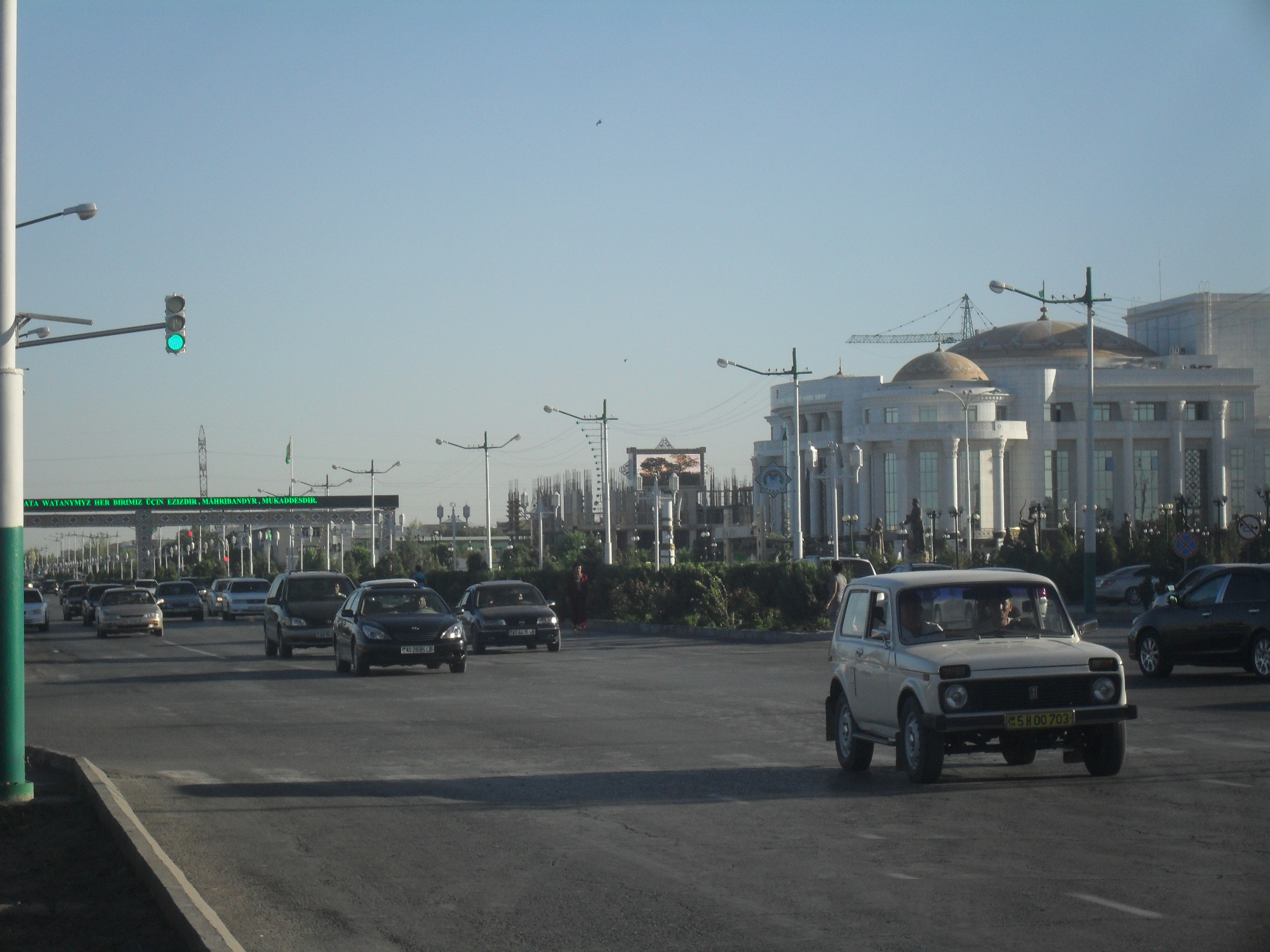
Türkmenabat

Mary

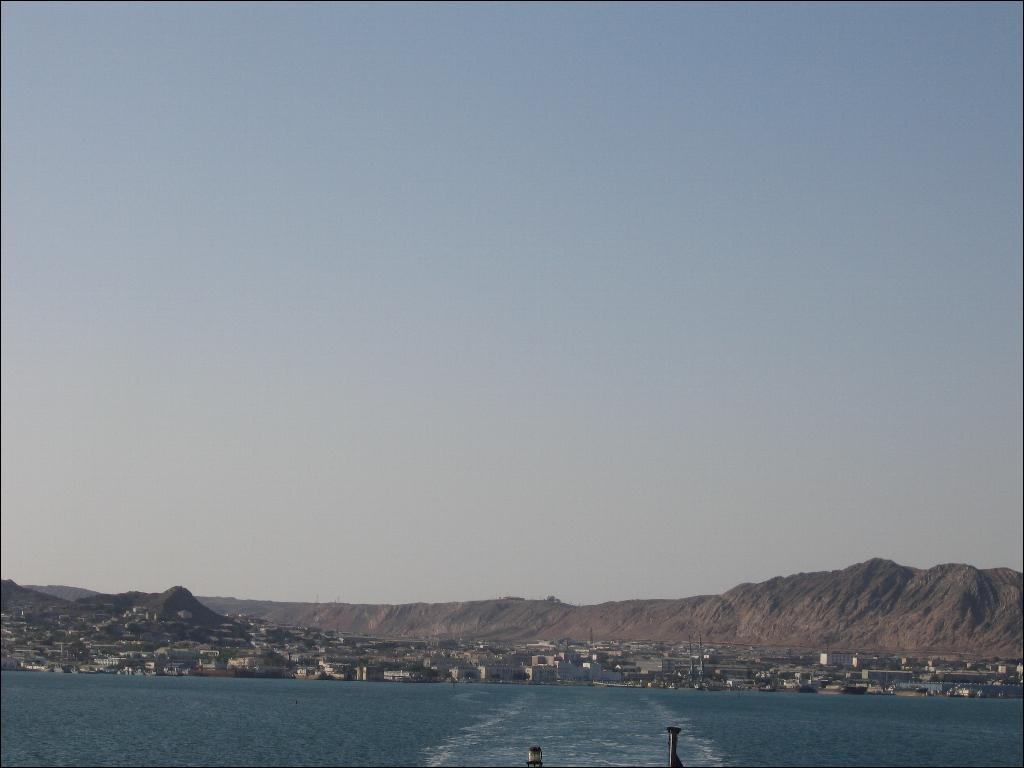
Türkmenbaşy

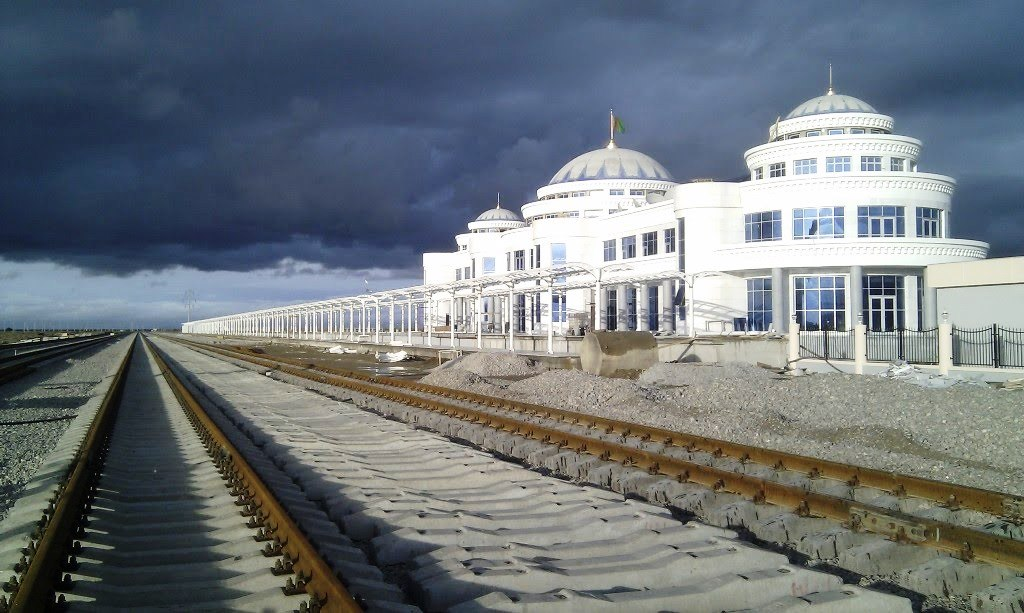
Bereket

Here is a list of the 51 municipalities designated as cities by law in Turkmenistan arranged by administrative divisions and alphabetical order as of December 20, 2022. Cities with district status are bolded.

| City | Population (2022) | District | Province | Note |
|---|---|---|---|---|
| Änew | 28,653 | Ak bugdaý | Ahal province | |
| Altyn asyr | 13,660 | Altyn asyr | Ahal province | |
| **Arkadag** | 64,086 | **Arkadag** | Ahal province | City with 2 internal districts (boroughs). |
| Babadaýhan | 13,440 | Babadaýhan | Ahal province | |
| Bäherden | 37,588 | Bäherden | Ahal province | |
| Gökdepe | 33,381 | Gökdepe | Ahal province | |
| Kaka | 33,315 | Kaka | Ahal province | |
| Sarahs | 31,269 | Sarahs | Ahal province | |
| Tejen | 67,488 | Tejen | Ahal province | |
| Aşgabat | 1,030,063 | none | Aşgabat | National capital and a province-equivalent city with 4 internal districts. |
| **Balkanabat** | 123,190 | **Balkanabat** | Balkan province | |
| Bereket | 23,697 | Bereket | Balkan province | |
| Esenguly | 12,918 | Esenguly | Balkan province | |
| Etrek | 12,508 | Etrek | Balkan province | |
| Garabogaz | 7,877 | Türkmenbaşy | Balkan province | Not the administrative center of its district. |
| Gyzylarbat | 48,558 | Gyzylarbat | Balkan province | |
| Magtymguly | 15,386 | Magtymguly | Balkan province | |
| **Türkmenbaşy** | 91,745 | **Türkmenbaşy** | Balkan province | City with an internal district. |
| Akdepe | 28,045 | Akdepe | Daşoguz province | |
| Andalyp | 36,594 | Garaşsyzlyk | Daşoguz province | |
| Boldumsaz | 39,532 | Boldumsaz | Daşoguz province | |
| **Daşoguz** | 201,142 | **Daşoguz** | Daşoguz province | |
| Görogly | 26,770 | Görogly | Daşoguz province | |
| Gubadag | 18,950 | Gubadag | Daşoguz province | |
| Köneürgenç | 37,176 | Köneürgenç | Daşoguz province | |
| Saparmyrat Türkmenbaşy | 20,720 | Saparmyrat Türkmenbaşy | Daşoguz province | The full name is "Saparmyrat Türkmenbaşy adyndaky." ("in the name of Turkmenbaşy Saparmyrat") |
| Şabat | 19,392 | Şabat | Daşoguz province | |
| Dänew | 15,409 | Dänew | Lebap province | |
| Darganata | 13,777 | Darganata | Lebap province | |
| Dostluk | 13,655 | Döwletli | Lebap province | |
| Farap | 20,547 | Farap | Lebap province | |
| Garabekewül | 15,135 | Garabekewül | Lebap province | |
| Gazojak | 21,035 | Darganata | Lebap province | |
| Halaç | 20,778 | Halaç | Lebap province | |
| Hojambaz | 13,485 | Hojambaz | Lebap province | |
| Kerki | 32,489 | Kerki | Lebap province | |
| Köýtendag | 18,816 | Köýtendag | Lebap province | |
| Magdanly | 44,508 | Köýtendag | Lebap province | |
| Sakar | 12,769 | Saýat | Lebap province | |
| Saýat | 21,619 | Saýat | Lebap province | |
| Seýdi | 29,670 | Dänew | Lebap province | |
| **Türkmenabat** | 230,861 | **Türkmenabat** | Lebap province | |
| **Baýramaly** | 70,376 | **Baýramaly** | Mary province | |
| **Mary** | 167,027 | **Mary** | Mary province | |
| Murgap | 14,822 | Murgap | Mary province | |
| Sakarçäge | 11,891 | Sakarçäge | Mary province | |
| Serhetabat | 16,038 | Tagtabazar | Mary province | |
| Şatlyk | 7,725 | Oguzhan | Mary province | |
| Türkmengala | 16,696 | Türkmengala | Mary province | |
| Ýolöten | 30,709 | Ýolöten | Mary province | |

=== Changes in 2022 ===
The former cities of Gumdag and Hazar were downgraded to town status in November 2022, and thus have been removed from this list. The cities previously named Gurbansoltan Eje adyndaky, Nyýazow, and Serdar were renamed Andalyp, Şabat, and Gyzylarbat respectively. The new city of Arkadag was formally incorporated on 20 December 2022 by act of the Turkmen parliament.

== See also ==
- Districts of Turkmenistan
- Towns of Turkmenistan
- List of renamed cities in Turkmenistan
- List of cities, towns and villages in Turkmenistan
- OpenStreetMap: Turkmenistan Geoname Changes
- OpenStreetMap: Districts in Turkmenistan (authoritative list of all municipal structures as of 5 January 2018)
