= Towns of Turkmenistan =

A şäherçe, translated as "town," is a form of third-level administrative division of Turkmenistan. In terms of hierarchy, a şäherçe is slightly less important than a şäher (city) and more important than a geňeşlik (rural council). Towns are usually subordinate to an etrap (district) or, in some cases, to a city with district status. Towns may subordinate one or several oba (village).

A municipality is granted the status of town by law. They are headed by a presidentially appointed häkim ("mayor;" "governor").

== List ==
=== Municipalities designated as towns ===
Here is a list of the 71 municipalities designated as towns by law in Turkmenistan, arranged by administrative divisions and alphabetical order as of September 8, 2025. Towns acting as the capital of their respective district are bolded.

| Town | Population (2022) | District | Province | Note |
|---|---|---|---|---|
| Bereketli zaman | 1,429 | Ak bugdaý District | Ahal Province | |
| Berkarar | 2,747 | Ak bugdaý District | Ahal Province | |
| Bokurdak | 7,726 | Ak bugdaý District | Ahal Province | |
| Ýaşlyk | 8,172 | Ak bugdaý District | Ahal Province | |
| Aba Annaýew | | Arkadag | Ahal Province | Town established on May 10, 2022. |
| Arçman | 6,014 | Bäherden District | Ahal Province | |
| Yzgant | 6,547 | Gökdepe District | Ahal Province | |
| Duşak | 8,405 | Kaka District | Ahal Province | |
| Gaňňaly | 3,580 | Sarahs District | Ahal Province | |
| Bagtyýarlyk | 9,804 | Tejen District | Ahal Province | |
| Gumdag | 30,884 | Balkanabat | Balkan Province | |
| Hazar | 14,671 | Balkanabat | Balkan Province | |
| Jebel | 15,056 | Balkanabat | Balkan Province | |
| Oglanly | 1,715 | Balkanabat | Balkan Province | |
| Uzboý | 730 | Balkanabat | Balkan Province | |
| Galkynyş | | Bereket District | Balkan Province | Town established on December 10, 2022. |
| Ekerem | 3,972 | Esenguly District | Balkan Province | |
| Garadepe | 9,016 | Esenguly District | Balkan Province | |
| Janahyr | 3,664 | Gyzylarbat District | Balkan Province | |
| Akdaş | 6,750 | Türkmenbaşy District | Balkan Province | |
| Belek | 1,720 | Türkmenbaşy District | Balkan Province | |
| Guwlymaýak | 1,853 | Türkmenbaşy District | Balkan Province | |
| Gyzylgaýa | 993 | Türkmenbaşy District | Balkan Province | |
| Gyzylsuw | 859 | Türkmenbaşy District | Balkan Province | |
| **Türkmenbaşy** | 7,334 | Türkmenbaşy District | Balkan Province | |
| Orazgeldi Ärsaryýew | 8,040 | Akdepe District | Daşoguz Province | |
| Gökçäge | 7,569 | Gubadag District | Daşoguz Province | District established on September 19, 2025. |
| Rejepguly Ataýew | 2,760 | Garaşsyzlyk District | Daşoguz Province | District established on September 19, 2025. |
| Bereket | 13,549 | Köneürgenç District | Daşoguz Province | |
| Bitaraplyk | | Köneürgenç District | Daşoguz Province | Town established on September 8, 2025. |
| Aşyr Kakabaýew | 9,603 | Saparmyrat Türkmenbaşy District | Daşoguz Province | |
| Sadylla Rozmetow | 2,316 | Şabat District | Daşoguz Province | |
| **Ruhubelent** | 1,653 | Ruhubelent District | Daşoguz Province | |
| **Çärjew** | 1,825 | Çärjew District | Lebap Province | |
| Hojagala | 4,752 | Çärjew District | Lebap Province | |
| Kiştiwan | 5,989 | Çärjew District | Lebap Province | |
| Asuda | 6,807 | Dänew District | Lebap Province | |
| Bahar | 3,090 | Dänew District | Lebap Province | |
| Garaşsyzlyk | 7,136 | Dänew District | Lebap Province | |
| Lebap | 3,058 | Darganata District | Lebap Province | |
| Amyderýa | 10,330 | Döwletli District | Lebap Province | District established on September 19, 2025. |
| **Döwletli** | 4,942 | Döwletli District | Lebap Province | District established on September 19, 2025. |
| Kerkiçi | 14,996 | Döwletli District | Lebap Province | District established on September 19, 2025. |
| Jeýhun | 9,496 | Farap District | Lebap Province | District established on September 19, 2025. |
| Yslam | 4,869 | Garabekewül District | Lebap Province | District established on September 19, 2025. |
| Çohpetde | 7,503 | Halaç District | Lebap Province | |
| Beşir | 6,971 | Hojambaz District | Lebap Province | |
| Astanababa | 11,466 | Kerki District | Lebap Province | |
| Başsaka | 3,498 | Kerki District | Lebap Province | |
| Garamätnyýaz | 1,844 | Kerki District | Lebap Province | |
| Garaşsyzlygyň 15 ýyllygy | 1,598 | Kerki District | Lebap Province | |
| Garlyk | 16 | Köýtendag District | Lebap Province | |
| Gurşun magdan käni | 3,953 | Köýtendag District | Lebap Province | |
| Kelif | 3,701 | Köýtendag District | Lebap Province | |
| Mukry | 7,013 | Köýtendag District | Lebap Province | |
| Çaltut | 4,857 | Saýat District | Lebap Province | |
| Suwçyoba | 1,758 | Saýat District | Lebap Province | |
| Bagtyýarlyk | 1,727 | Baýramaly District | Mary Province | |
| Berkarar | 1,408 | Baýramaly District | Mary Province | |
| Mekan | 12,115 | Baýramaly District | Mary Province | |
| **Ýagtyýol** | 10,488 | Garagum | Mary province | |
| Peşanaly | 935 | Mary District | Mary Province | |
| Saparmyrat Türkmenbaşy | 13,251 | Mary District | Mary Province | |
| Deňizhan | 4,686 | Oguzhan District | Mary Province | District established on September 19, 2025. |
| **Oguzhan** | 6,430 | Oguzhan District | Mary Province | District established on September 19, 2025. |
| Döwletli zaman | 982 | Oguzhan District | Mary Province | District established on September 19, 2025. |
| Parahat | 2,494 | Oguzhan District | Mary Province | District established on September 19, 2025. |
| **Tagtabazar** | 13,312 | Tagtabazar District | Mary Province | |
| Zähmet | 3,855 | Türkmengala District | Mary Province | |
| **Mollanepes** | 2,878 | Wekilbazar District | Mary Province | |
| Wekilbazar | 2,832 | Wekilbazar District | Mary Province | |

== See also ==
- Districts of Turkmenistan
- List of cities in Turkmenistan
- List of cities, towns and villages in Turkmenistan
