= Gökdepe, Murgap =

Gökdepe Gökdepe obasy
- Village
- Location in Turkmenistan
- Coordinates: 37°30′54″N 62°01′21″E
- Country: Turkmenistan
- Province: Mary Province
- District: Murgap District
- Rural Council: Gökdepe geňeşligi

Population (2022 official census)
  - Total: 6,767
- Time zone: UTC+5

Gökdepe, formerly known as Söwdägär, Sevdager in Russian (Севдагер), or the kolkhoz named after Kuybyshev (Колхоз имени Куйбышева), is a village in Murgap District, Mary Province, Turkmenistan. It is located less than 5 km northeast of Murgap and circa 20 km southeast from Mary. In 2022, it had a population of 6,767 people.

== Etymology ==
Gökdepe is a compound of two Turkmen words: "Gök," which means "Blue," and "Depe," which roughly translates to "Hill" or "Mound."

The village was previously named Söwdägär, which is a rare word borrowed from Persian, "سوداگر," "Soodagar," that means "Merchant" or "Trader."

== History ==
On 15 August 2009, the village of Gyzyl agronom from Gökdepe Rural Council was renamed "Garaşsyzlyk." It was later transferred to Gowşutbent Rural Council.

== Rural Council ==
Gökdepe is the seat of a rural council that consists of two villages:

- Gökdepe, village
- Amaşaýap, village

== See also ==
- List of cities, towns and villages in Turkmenistan
- List of municipalities in Mary Province
