= Berkarar, Baýramaly =

Berkarar Berkarar şäherçesi
- Location within Turkmenistan
- Coordinates: 37°57′16″N 62°39′58″E
- Country: Turkmenistan
- Province: Mary Province
- District: Baýramaly District
- Elevation: 196 m (643 ft)

Population (2022 official census)
  - Total: 1,408
- Time zone: UTC+5 (TMT)
  - Summer (DST): UTC+5 (TMT)

Berkarar, formerly known as Rawnina (in Russian: Равнина), is a town in Baýramaly District, Mary Province, Turkmenistan. It was built along the railway between Mary and Türkmenabat, right between Bagtyýarlyk and Zähmet, two other towns. In 2022, it had a population of 1,408 people.

== Etymology ==
In Turkmen, the word "Berkarar" is an adjective translating as "Stable."

== History ==
On 1st August 2016, the town of Rawnina was renamed Berkarar.

== See also ==
- Towns of Turkmenistan
- List of municipalities in Mary Province
