= Saparmyrat Türkmenbaşy, Mary =

Saparmyrat Türkmenbaşy Saparmyrat Türkmenbaşy adyndaky şäherçe
- Town
- Location in Turkmenistan
- Coordinates: 37°30′45″N 61°49′42″E
- Country: Turkmenistan
- Province: Mary Province
- Districts: Mary District

Population (2022 official census)
  - Total: 13,251
- Time zone: UTC+5 (+5)

Saparmyrat Türkmenbaşy, formerly known as Energetik (in Russian: Энергетик), is a town and capital of Mary District, Mary Province, Turkmenistan. It is located near major electrical power plants, hence the Soviet-era name. In 2022, it had a population of 13,251

== Etymology ==
The town was named Energetik until 1993; In Russian, "Энергетик" refers to a power engineering specialist.

In 1993, the town was renamed Saparmyrat Türkmenbaşy adyndaky şäherçe, which translates literally to "Town named after Saparmyrat Türkmenbaşy." Saparmyrat Türkmenbaşy refers to Saparmyrat Nyýazow, first president of Turkmenistan who renamed himself "Türkmenbaşy," i.e. "Head/Leader of the Turkmen."

== History ==
On 1st August 2016, the territory of the town was transferred to Mary District and Saparmyrat Türkmenbaşy became its capital.

== See also ==
- Towns of Turkmenistan
- List of municipalities in Mary Province
