= Çaşgyn =

Village in Mary Province, Turkmenistan

Çaşgyn Çaşgyn obasy
- Village
- Location in Turkmenistan
- Coordinates: 37°47′48″N 61°33′12″E
- Country: Turkmenistan
- Province: Mary Province
- District: Sakarçäge District
- Rural council: Çaşgyn geňeşligi

Population (2022 official census)
  - Total: 15,470
- Time zone: UTC+5

Çaşgyn, formerly known as Kommunizm (in Russian: Коммунизм), and sometimes called Çaşkent, is a village in Sakarçäge District, Mary Province, Turkmenistan. In 2022, it had a population of 15,470 people, making it the most populated village in Mary Province.

== Etymology ==
In Turkmen, "Çaşgyn" is a word that roughly translates as "Confused," or "Messy."

== Society ==
In 2023, RFE/RL in Turkmenistan highlighted issues related to waste management and unemployment in Mary Province. In April 2023, they revealed how streets could be littered with rubbish, sometimes "for more than a week." In August 2023, they covered how villages in rural areas like Çaşgyn suffer from a lack of economic activities. The population usually works in cotton and wheat fields with little financial aid, resulting in people leaving. The next year, in May 2024, no real change is observed as people resettle in cities like "Mary, Baýramaly, Aşgabat, or even Türkmenbaşy" to find a job.

== See also ==
- List of municipalities in Mary Province
