= Türkmengala =

Türkmengala Türkmengala şäheri
- City
- Location in Turkmenistan
- Coordinates: 37°25′19″N 62°20′12″E
- Country: Turkmenistan
- Region: Mary Region
- District: Türkmengala District

Population (2022 official census)
  - Total: 16,696
- Time zone: UTC+5

Türkmengala is a city and capital of Türkmengala District, Mary Region, Turkmenistan. In 2022, it had a population of 16,696 people.

== Etymology ==
The name means "Turkmen fortress". Atanyyazow suggests that the settlement received this name in the 17th or 18th century due to the numerous battles between Turkmen tribes on the one hand and the Kajar (Kyzylbash) tribe on the other.

== Transportation ==
Türkmengala is on the P-25 highway that connects Baýramaly and Ýolöten.

Türkmengala is linked to Mary, Türkmenabat by the country's 600 km motorway network.

== See also ==
- Cities of Turkmenistan
- List of municipalities in Mary Province
