= Ramis Bahshaliyev =

Canadian powerlifter

Competition record

World Championship
1st	2022 Almaty	-74 kg
1st	2014 Las Vegas	-90 kg
1st	2010 Las Vegas	-82 kg
1st	2007 Orlando	-82 kg
1st	2006 Las Vegas	-82 kg
1st	2005 Laughlin	-82 kg
1st	2003 Richmond	-82 kg
1st	2002 Laughlin	-75 kg
1st	2001 San-Diego	-75 kg
9th	1999 Trento	-75 kg
9th	1998 Amberg	-75 kg

Asian Championship
6th	2000 New Delhi	-75 kg

USSR Championship
5th	1991 Mariupol	-67,5 kg

Central Asian Championship
1st	1989 Ashkhabad	-60 kg

Canadian National Championship
1st	2023 Richmond	-74 kg

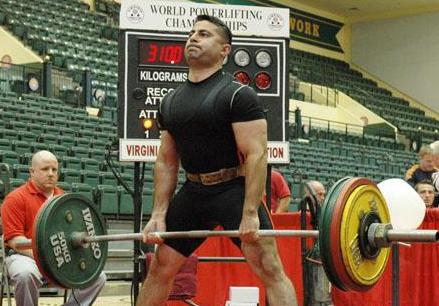
2007 World Championship

Ramis (BE) Bahshaliyev (Russian: Бахшалиев Рамис Бахманович, Azerbaijani: Ramiz Bəhman oğlu Bahshaliyev). Bahshaliyev is a 9-time World Powerlifting Champion (Amateur Athletic Union (AAU)) and operates out of the British Columbian city of Port Moody.

== Biography ==
Ramis was born in 1971 in the Turkmen town of Iolotan, now the administrative center of Ýolöten District in the Mary Region of Turkmenistan. Between 1989 and 2004, Bahshaliyev represented Turkmen SSR (USSR) and Turkmenistan in powerlifting and bodybuilding competitions, with the title of the nation being represented changing in 2001, following the dissolution of the USSR.

== Current Status ==
Bahshaliyev is currently listed as the British Columbian contact for the AAU Powerlifting division.

== Sources ==
- https://web.archive.org/web/20111204000040/http://www.powerlifting.jp/ASIA/
- http://bcpowerlifting.ca
