= Alvina Shpady =

Karakalpak artist

Alvina Andreevna Shpady (January 31, 1935 – June 22, 2019; Russian: Альвина Андреевна Шпады) was an artist and art restorer in Uzbekistan. As a longtime restorer at the Nukus Museum of Art, she worked to preserve the museum's holdings as well as to promote traditional Karakalpak textile techniques.

== Biography ==
Alvina Shpady was born in 1935 in Baýramaly, the capital of Turkmenistan's Mary Region. Her family were Volga Germans who had been resettled further east in the Soviet Union.

Shpady studied at the Shota Rustaveli Turkmen State Art School in the Turkmen capital of Ashgabat, graduating in 1957. She then returned for a few years to Baýramaly, where she taught art to secondary school students and worked as a cartographer for geologists. Then, in 1960, she moved the Uzbek Soviet Socialist Republic, settling in Nukus, where she began working at the regional branch of the Academy of Sciences of Uzbekistan. There, she met and began a long working partnership with the artist and collector Igor Savitsky.

In 1962, she left Nukus for several years beginning to study textiles, first at the Ostrovsky Institute in Tashkent (now the Uzbekistan State Institute of Arts and Culture) and then at the Moscow State Textile Institute. After returning to Nukus in 1969, she became a textile restorer at the Nukus Museum of Art, founded by Savitsky, which houses an important collection of Russian avant-garde art. She would spend the bulk of her career at the Nukus Museum, partnering closely with Savitsky and working to restore paintings as well as textiles and other art objects. She also worked to promote and preserve traditional textile techniques and folk art in the region.

Shpady also produced her own artistic work, including paintings as well as traditional textiles such as suzani. As an artist, she was particularly interested in monumentalism, as well as affectionate depictions of Karakalpakstan. She also illustrated various books, including a seminal book by Savitsky on applied arts among the Karakalpak people. Additionally, she produced costumes and scenery for stage and screen, working with the Karakalpak State Musical Theater and on the 1981 film Rebellious.

In 2015, Shpady was accused of forgery in her restoration of Nikolai Karakhan's painting "Women Picking Tulips," which was included in the major exhibition "Masterpieces Reborn" that Shpady herself curated. While the accusation was viewed by her colleagues as ill founded, display of the painting in other museums was restricted until May 2019, when the charges were dropped entirely.

Shpady's family eventually returned to Germany in the 1990s, but she chose to stay in Uzbekistan. She was recognized as an Honored Cultural Worker of the Republic of Karakalpakstan. She died in June 2019, at the age of 84. The following year, the Nukus Museum organized an exhibit, "Another Facet of Talent," in honor of what would have been her 85th birthday.
