= Mollanepes, Wekilbazar =

Town in Wekilbazar District, Mary Province, Turkmenistan

Mollanepes Mollanepes adyndaky şäherçe
- Town
- Location in Turkmenistan
- Coordinates: 37.604219°N 61.926193°E
- Country: Turkmenistan
- Province: Mary Province
- District: Wekilbazar District

Population (2022 official census)
  - Town: 4,184
  - Urban: 2,878
  - Rural: 1,306
- Time zone: UTC+5

Mollanepes, previously known as imeni Poltoratskogo (in Russian: имени Полторацского), is a town and capital of Wekilbazar District, Mary Province, Turkmenistan. It is located approximately 5 km east of the city of Mary, on the other side of the Garagum Canal. In 2022, it had a population of 2,878 people.

== Etymology ==
From 1975 until 1993, the town was named imeni Poltoratskogo, i.e. "named after Poltoratskiy," in reference to Pavel Poltoratskiy, Soviet revolutionary.

The town is now known as Mollanepes adyndaky şäherçe, i.e. "Town named after Mollanepes." It was renamed by decree in 1993, in honor of 19th-century Turkmen writer, Mollanepes.

== Transportation ==
Mollanepes is served by the M37 highway, a rail station on the Trans-Caspian Railway, the Garagum Canal, and the Mary International Airport.

== Dependencies ==
Mollanepes has one dependent rural village: Üçdepe, circa 40 km north, which was set on 15 August 2009.

== See also ==
- List of municipalities in Mary Province
- Towns of Turkmenistan
