= Şatlyk =

Şatlyk Şatlyk şäheri
- City
- Location in Turkmenistan
- Coordinates: 37.595673°N 61.590214°E
- Country: Turkmenistan
- Province: Mary Province
- District: Oguzhan District

Population (2022 official census)
  - Total: 7,725
- Time zone: UTC+5

Şatlyk, formerly known as Şehitli, is a city in Oguzhan District, Mary Region, Turkmenistan. It is located circa 20 km west of Mary, 50 km east of Parahat, and 8 km southwest of Sakarçäge. In 2022, Şatlyk had a population of 7,725.

== Etymology ==
Prior to 1971, the settlement was known as Şehitli. The word şehit in Turkmen means "martyr" or "someone who dies an untimely death", but the reference is obscure. The word şatlyk, on the other hand, means "joy, happiness".

== Economy ==
Şatlyk's main industry is natural gas extraction from the Şatlyk Gas Field. The Şatlyk compressor station is nearby. A large poultry farm is located east of the city.

=== Transportation ===
Şatlyk lies on the P-9 highway, which connects to the outskirts of the city of Mary to the east and intersects with the M37 highway at the town of Deňizhan to the southwest. It is near the Mary-Turkmenabat rail line of the Trans-Caspian Railway and is served by Garybata rail station. Near Şatlyk, at the Şatlyk compressor station, is the start of the East–West pipeline for transport of natural gas.

== See also ==
- Cities of Turkmenistan
- List of municipalities in Mary Province
