= Shatlyk gas field =

Natural gas field in Mary Province, Turkmenistan

Shatlyk Gas Field
- Country: Turkmenistan
- Region: Mary Province
- Offshore/onshore: onshore
- Operator: Türkmengaz

Field history
- Discovery: 1974
- Start of production: 1980

Production
- Current production of gas: 8.2×10^{6} m^{3}/d 287×10^{6} cu ft/d
- Estimated gas in place: 943×10^{9} m^{3} 33×10^{12} cu ft

The Shatlyk Gas Field is a natural gas field located in the Mary Province near the city of Şatlyk. It was discovered in 1974 and developed by Türkmengaz. It began production in 1980 and produces natural gas and condensates. At the beginning of production was considered as one among 10 largest in the world. The total proven reserves of the Shatlyk gas field are around 33 trillion cubic feet (943 km^{3}), and production was slated to be around 287 million cubic feet/day (8.2×10^{5}m^{3}) as of 2013.
