= Isgender, Turkmenistan =

Isgender Isgender obasy
- Village
- Location in Turkmenistan
- Coordinates: 39°04′37″N 55°55′44″E
- Country: Turkmenistan
- Province: Balkan Province
- District: Bereket District
- Town: Galkynyş

Population (2022 official census)
  - Total: 858
- Time zone: UTC+5

Isgender is a village in Bereket District, Balkan Province, Turkmenistan. It is nearly 15 km southeast from the town of Galkynyş, 30 km west from Gyzylarbat, or 40 km east from Bereket. In 2022, the village had a population of 858 people.

== Etymology ==
Isgender is a local equivalent to the name Alexander. This name refers to Alexander the Great, who is said to have established a fortress nearby during his Persian campaigns.

== History ==
The village of Isgender was initially located within Gulmaç rural council's jurisdiction. On 10 December 2022 however, Gulmaç rural council was abolished while villages under its jurisdiction were transferred to the town of Galkynyş.

== Subordination ==
Gulmaç is subordinated to the town of Galkynyş along with five other villages:

- Galkynyş, town
  - Gamakly, village
  - Gulmaç, village
  - Isgender, village
  - Ok, village
  - Öýleguşluk, village

== See also ==
- List of cities, towns and villages in Turkmenistan
- List of municipalities in Balkan Province
