= Oguzhan (town) =

Oguzhan Oguzhan şäherçesi
- Town
- Location in Turkmenistan
- Coordinates: 37°19′N 61°05′E
- Country: Turkmenistan
- Province: Mary Region
- District: Oguzhan District

Population (2022 official census)
  - Total: 6,430
- Time zone: UTC+5

Oguzhan, formerly known as Gulanly, is a town in Oguzhan District, Mary Region, Turkmenistan. It is the site of a fertilizer depot and a cotton yard. In 2022, it had a population of 6,430 people.

== Etymology ==
Oguz han, or Oguzhan, is the Turkmen spelling for Oghuz Khagan, the mythical progenitor of the Turkic nations, and the town was renamed in his honor. Atanyyazow is silent on the significance or origin of the name Gulanly, which literally means "with wild asses" (gulan "wild ass" + -ly "with").

== History ==
As Altyn sähra District was abolished on 1st August 2016, the administrative center of the district was transferred from Oguzhan to Parahat.

On 9 November 2022, Oguzhan District was abolished by parliamentary decree. Oguzhan was then transferred to Murgap District. On 19 September 2025, Oguzhan District was re-established.

== Transportation ==
Oguzhan features a station of the same name on a branch of the Trans-Caspian Railway built between 1992 and 1996 that leads from Parahat junction to Sarahs and onward to Iran. The town is also served by the P-9 highway.

== See also ==
- Towns of Turkmenistan
- List of municipalities in Mary Province
