= Döwletli zaman =

Döwletli zaman Döwletli zaman şäherçesi
- Town
- Location in Turkmenistan
- Coordinates: 37°20′18″N 61°19′01″E
- Country: Turkmenistan
- Province: Mary Province
- District: Oguzhan District
- Establishment: 1st August 2016

Population (2022 official census)
  - Total: 982
- Time zone: UTC+5

Döwletli zaman is a new town located in Mary Province, Turkmenistan. It was granted township status on 1st August 2016. In 2022, it had a population of 982 people.

== Etymology ==
The name "Döwletli zaman" is a typical example of independent Turkmenistan's new settlements' names. It's made of two words: "Döwletli," which refers to wealth, prosperity, well-being, and "zaman," which means "time." The name of the settlement echoes the idea of "Happy days."

== History ==
The town was lawfully established by a decree of the Assembly of Turkmenistan signed on August 1, 2016. The place was the third of its kind inaugurated during summer 2016, along with Bagtyýar zaman in S.A.Nyýazow District and Berkarar zaman in Garabekewül District, which was called a Potemkin village by RFE/RL.

When Oguzhan District was abolished in 2022, the town was transferred to Sakarçäge District. Oguzhan District was reestablished in late 2025.

On 11 February 2025, a ceremony was held in Döwletli zaman's cultural center, inaugurating Sakarçäge District as "district of the year 2024" in the presence of President Serdar Berdimuhamedow.

== See also ==
- List of municipalities in Mary Province
- Towns of Turkmenistan
