= Yklymberdi Paromov =

Turkmen politician (born 1965)

Yklymberdi Paromov (born 1965) is a Turkmen politician. He is the Minister of Textile Industry of Turkmenistan since May 2006.

Born in Mary District, in 1990 he graduated from the Turkmen State University as a qualified history teacher. In 2005 he was appointed first deputy of the Foreign Minister and since 2006 head of the Presidential Property Management Department and Textile Industry of Turkmenistan.
