= Parahat =

Parahat Parahat şäherçesi
- Town
- Location in Turkmenistan
- Coordinates: 37°30′47″N 61°02′18″E
- Country: Turkmenistan
- Province: Mary Province
- District: Oguzhan District

Population (2022 official census)
  - Total: 2,494
- Time zone: UTC+5

Parahat, formerly known as Jojukly or Ju-Ju-Klu (in Russian: Джу-Джу-Клу), is a town and administrative center of Oguzhan District, Mary Province, Turkmenistan. It is located on the Trans-Caspian railway halfway between Şatlyk and Tejen, 50 km east and west respectively. It is where the railway splits in two; one way goes to Ashgabat, the other one to Sarahs. In 2022, it had a population of 2,494 people.

== Etymology ==
The word "Parahat" roughly translates to "Peace."

The old name, Jojukly, is a word composed of "jojuk," which translates as "piglet," and the suffix "-li," which is used to form adjectives. The whole word may be translated as "[a place] with piglets."

== History ==
In 1988, a district was established and named Parahat District. It was then renamed Nyýazow District in 1992. The district was split in two: the southern part was named Oguzhan District while the northern part was named Altyn sähra District; Parahat was set as its capital.

On 10 May 2010, Saparmyrat Türkmenbaşy railway station ("Saparmyrat Türkmenbaşy adyndaky demir ýol stansiýasy"), the town's only subordinated rural village, was abolished.

On 1 August 2016, Altyn sähra District was abolished and its whole territory was transferred to Oguzhan District; the administrative center was transferred from Oguzhan to Parahat. On 9 November 2022, Oguzhan District was abolished; 165,266 hectares were transferred to Sakarçäge District, including Parahat. On 19 September 2025, the district was re-established and all changes were reverted.

== See also ==
- List of municipalities in Mary Province
- Towns of Turkmenistan
