= Oguzhan District =

Oguzhan District Oguzhan etraby
- District
- Interactive map of Oguzhan District
- Country: Turkmenistan
- Province: Mary Province
- Capital: Parahat
- Establishment: 1988 (as Parahat District)

Area
  - District: 505,070 acres (204,393 ha)

Population (2022 official census)
  - District: 32,950
  - Density: 41,750/sq mi (16,121/km^{2})
  - Urban: 22,317
  - Rural: 10,633
- Time zone: UTC+5 (+5)

Oguzhan District, formerly Nyýazow District or Parahat District, is a district in Mary Province, Turkmenistan. The administrative center of the district is the town of Parahat. According to 2022 census, its constituencies had a total population of 32,950 people.

== Etymology ==
Oguzhan District is named after Oguz han, a legendary and semimythological khan of the Turkic peoples.

It was initially named Parahat District; the name was borrowed to the town of the same name. In Turkmen, "Parahat" is a word that roughly translates to "Peace." On 19 January 1992, it was renamed to Nyýazow District, which refers to Saparmyrat Nyýazow, first president of Turkmenistan.

== History ==
The district was established in 1988 as Parahat District. It was then renamed Nyýazow District in 1992.

Parahat was cut from the district to make a whole new district named Altyn sähra. On 1 August 2016, Altyn sähra District was abolished and its whole territory (45,558 ha) was transferred back to Oguzhan District. On 9 November 2022, Oguzhan District was abolished; 39,127 hectares were transferred to Murgap District and 165,266 hectares were transferred to Sakarçäge District. On 19 September 2025, the district was re-established and all changes were reverted.

== Administrative Subdivisions ==
Oguzhan District includes 10 third-level subdivisions, one city, four towns and five rural councils, and 10 villages:

=== Cities ===
- Şatlyk

=== Towns ===
- Deňizhan, including two villages
- Döwletli zaman
- Oguzhan
- Parahat

=== Rural Councils ===
- Altyn zaman, including one village
- Deňizhan, including one village
- Gökhan, including four villages
- Merdana, including one village
- Ýyldyzhan, including one village

== See also ==
- Districts of Turkmenistan
