= Gäwers, Turkmenistan =

Gäwers Gäwers obasy
- Village
- Location in Turkmenistan
- Coordinates: 37°47′39″N 58°43′43″E
- Country: Turkmenistan
- Region: Ahal Region
- District: Ak bugdaý District
- Town: Bereketli zaman

Population (2022 official census)
  - Total: 3,396
- Time zone: UTC+5

Gäwers is a village in Ak bugdaý District, Ahal Region, in southern Turkmenistan. It is the easternmost village of the traditional Ahal Teke tribal territory. It borrows its name from the plain where it is located. In 2022, it had a population of 3,396 people.

== History ==
In 2016, the town of Bereketli zaman was built just next to Gäwers. On 9 November 2022, Gäwers Rural Council was abolished. Its constituencies were transferred to Bereketli zaman's authority.

== Transportation ==
Gäwers is served by the M37 highway, the Trans-Caspian Railway, and a small agricultural airfield.

== See also ==
- List of municipalities in Ahal Province
