= Deňizhan =

Town in Mary Province, Turkmenistan

Deňizhan Deňizhan şäherçesi
- Town
- Location in Turkmenistan
- Coordinates: 37°14′06″N 61°14′41″E
- Country: Turkmenistan
- Province: Mary Province
- District: Oguzhan District

Population (2022 official census)
  - Town: 4,861
  - Urban: 4,686
  - Rural: 175
- Time zone: UTC+5

Deňizhan, formerly known as Hanhowuz or Hauz-Han in Russian ("Хауз-Хан"), is a town in Oguzhan District, Mary Province, Turkmenistan. The town was founded in 1962 next to the Hanhowuz Reservoir. In 2022, it had a population of 4,686 people.

== Etymology ==
The first name of the settlement, Hanhowuz, refers to Oguz han, the legendary khan of the Oguz Turks.

Hanhowuz's name was changed to Deňizhan in 2000. Its current name is borrowed from the mythical figure of Deniz han, (also spelled Dengiz khan) Deňiz han in Turkmen. He is one of the sons of Oguz han.

== History ==
Hanhowuz was founded in 1962. Its name was changed to Deňizhan in 2000.

On 10 May 2010, the village of Sähra was founded within the boundaries of the town of Deňizhan.

On 9 November 2022, Oguzhan District was abolished; 39,127 hectares were transferred to Murgap District, including Deňizhan. On 19 September 2025, the district was re-established and all changes were reverted.

== Economy ==
The village was initially populated by hydraulic engineers to maintain the reservoir. There is also a cotton factory nearby, to the west.

== Dependencies ==
There are two villages under Deňizhan's jurisdiction:

- Deňizhan, town
  - Kiçi Hanhowuz, village
  - Sähra, village

== See also ==
- List of municipalities in Mary Province
- Towns of Turkmenistan
