= Garagum District =

Karakum District Garagum Etraby
- District
- Interactive map of Karakum District
- Country: Turkmenistan
- Region: Mary Region
- Capital: Ýagtyýol

Area
  - Total: 2,452 km^{2} (947 sq mi)

Population (2022)
  - Total: 62,218
  - Density: 25.37/km^{2} (65.72/sq mi)
- Time zone: UTC+5 (+5)

Garagum District (also spelled Karakum District; Turkmen: Garagum etraby) is a district in Mary Region, Turkmenistan. Its administrative centre is the town of Ýagtyýol. As of the 2022 Turkmenistan census, the district had a population of 62,218 inhabitants and covered an area of 2,452 square kilometres (947 sq mi). It is predominantly rural, with approximately 83% of its population living in rural areas. The district is divided into seven village councils (geňeşlikler), and its economy is primarily agricultural, with cotton among its main crops.

== Name ==
The district was established as Karakum Raion (Russian: Каракумский район). Its Turkmen name is Garagum etraby. In April 1992, the Supreme Soviet of Turkmenistan adopted a resolution standardising the Russian spellings of administrative divisions according to Turkmen transcription. The resolution listed Garagum as the standardised spelling, replacing the previous Russian form Karakumskiý.

== Administration ==
The administrative centre of the Garagum District is the city of Ýagtyýol. Formerly, the administrative centre was Baýramaly, but was changed in 1991, when the Baýramaly District was established and the city was relocated out of Garagum. The district is divided into seven village councils (geňeşlikler): Akmeýdan, Durnalyýap, Göbeklidepe, Sähra, Şatlyk, Tarpýer, and Täzeoba. Previously a village council, in 2016, Ýagtyýol was granted the status of an urban-type settlement. The villages of Munan, Garajadepe and Guýruklydepe were transferred to its administrative jurisdiction, and the Ýagtyýol village council was abolished.

== Demographics ==
Based on the 2022 Turkmenistan census, published by the State Committee for Statistics, Garagum had a population of 62,218 inhabitants. The area of the district is 2,452 square kilometres (947 sq mi), meaning a population density of 25.37 inhabitants per square kilometre. The district had slightly more females with 31,308 (50.3%), in comparison to 30,910 (49.7%) males and a mostly rural lifestyle with a majority of 51,730 (83.1%) inhabitants living in rural areas and 10,488 (16.9%) inhabitants living in urban areas.

== Economy ==
Agriculture is practised in the Garagum District, with cotton being one of the main crops cultivated. In June 2020, a breach of the Sultan Bent dam on the Murgab River caused flooding in the district and a loss of the cotton harvest. Following the flooding, some farmers approached the district administration after encountering difficulties withdrawing cash.
