= Murgap, Turkmenistan =

City in Mary Province, Turkmenistan

Murgap Murgap şäheri
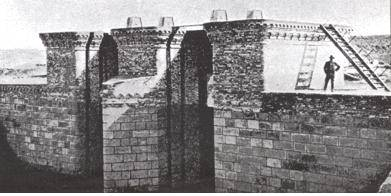

- Location in Turkmenistan
- Coordinates: 37°29′47″N 61°58′26″E
- Country: Turkmenistan
- Province: Mary Province
- District: Murgap District
- Township: 1940
- City status: 1st August 2016

Population (2022 official census)
  - Total: 14,822
- Time zone: UTC+5

Murgap, previously known as Stalino (in Russian: Сталино) or Moskovskiy (Московский), is a city and capital of Murgap District in Mary Province, Turkmenistan. The city is located 15 km southeast of Mary and 40 km northwest of Ýolöten. In 2022, it had a population of 14,822 people.

== Etymology ==
The city is named for the Murgap River. Folk etymology claims that "Murgap" comes from the Turkmen root words mur - "water" as in yagmur/yagmyr, literally translated as "drops of water" or "raindrops", plus gap, a dish or box, denoting the land as a place with water. However, Atanyyazow explains that the name is of Persian, not Turkic, origin; it was in earlier times Margab, and that later, as a result of folk ethnology, the first syllable's a sound was replaced by a u, making murg ab, "bird water". Atanyyazow notes as well that Hafiz-i-Abru recorded in the 15th century that the name was originally Merab, "River of Merv", and that al-Istakhri wrote, "...this river was named after the place where it flowed," and thus ultimately comes from an ancient variant name of the city of Mary.

During the Soviet period the then-"town of urban type" (Russian: посёлок городского типа) was named Stalino in honor of Joseph Stalin. Following Nikita Khrushchev's denunciation of Stalin in 1961, the name was changed to Moskovskiy (Russian: Московский), in honor of Moscow, the capital city of the Soviet Union, then still later to Murgap (Russian: Мургаб).

== Overview ==
It is located in the delta of the Murgab River and has a railway station on the Mary - Serhetabat line. It was classified as a town of urban type in 1940, and reclassified as a city subordinate to a district in 2016.

In 1973 there were 5,700 living in the town and today this has grown to around 10,000. In Soviet times there were asphalt and brick factories, and in 1974 a cotton processing plant was constructed.

On 1st August 2016, the town of Murgap was granted city status.

== See also ==
- Cities of Turkmenistan
- List of municipalities in Mary Province
