= Bereketli zaman =

Bereketli zaman Bereketli zaman şäherçesi
- Town
- Location in Turkmenistan
- Coordinates: 37°47′58″N 58°42′38″E
- Country: Turkmenistan
- Province: Ahal Province
- District: Ak bugdaý District
- Establishment: 28 September 2016

Population (2022 official census)
  - Total: 1,429
- Time zone: UTC+5

Bereketli zaman is a new town located in Ahal Province, Turkmenistan. It was granted township status on 28 September 2016. In 2022, it had a population of 1,429 people.

== Etymology ==
The name "Bereketli zaman" is a typical example of independent Turkmenistan's new settlements' names. It's made of two words: "Bereketli," which refers to fertility, productivity, and "zaman," which means "time." Together, it roughly translates as "Era of productivity."

== History ==
The town was built as a greenfield project. It was lawfully established by a decree of the Assembly of Turkmenistan signed on 28 September 2016. It was unveiled with great festivities in the presence of President Gurbanguly Berdimuhamedow on 12 October 2016. On the other hand, RFE/RL shows footage of empty streets on 19 October 2016, denouncing a set of "Potemkin villages" as other settlements of the same kind were unveiled in the previous months.

On 9 November 2022, the neighboring rural council centered around the village of Gäwers was abolished, and its constituencies were transferred to Bereketli zaman's authority.

== Dependencies ==
Since 9 November 2022, has two dependent rural village:

- Bereketli zaman, town
  - Gäwers, village
  - Gäwers bekedi, village

== See also ==
- Towns of Turkmenistan
- List of municipalities in Ahal Province
