= Sakarçäge =

Sakarçäge Sakarçäge şäheri
- City
- Location in Turkmenistan
- Coordinates: 37.663135°N 61.654257°E
- Country: Turkmenistan
- Region: Mary Region
- District: Sakarçäge District

Population (2022 official census)
  - Total: 11,891
- Time zone: UTC+5

Sakarçäge, formerly known as Çetili, is a city and capital of Sakarçäge District, Mary Province, Turkmenistan. The city is located circa 15 km west of Mary, within Mary oasis. In 2022, it had a population of 11,891 people.

== Etymology ==
Atanyyazow states that the name is related to the Sakar people, a minor Turkmen tribe. The word çäge means sand. The settlement was previously called Çetili (Chetili).

== See also ==
- Cities of Turkmenistan
- List of municipalities in Mary Province
