= Galkynyş =

Galkynyş Galkynyş şäherçesi
- Town
- Location in Turkmenistan
- Coordinates: 39°10′44″N 55°52′51″E
- Country: Turkmenistan
- Province: Balkan Province
- District: Bereket District
- Establishment: December 10, 2022

Population (2022 official census)
  - Rural: 4,118
- Time zone: UTC+5

Galkynyş is a new town located in Balkan Province, Turkmenistan. It was granted township status on December 10, 2022, at the end of a greenfield project. As its establishment took place in parallel with the 2022 census, its population has not been censused yet. Subordinate villages combined have a total of 4,118 people.

== Etymology ==
In Turkmen, the word Galkynyş roughly means "revival" or "renewal" and is sometimes translated as "renaissance" or "rebirth".

== History ==
The town is established on December 10, 2022, by parliamentary decree. By the same decree, the Gulmaç rural council is abolished and all of its villages are now subordinate to Galkynyş.

== Dependencies ==
Galkynyş as a town has five dependent rural villages:

Galkynyş, town:

- Gamakly, village
- Gulmaç, village
- Isgender, village
- Ok, village
- Öýleguşluk, village
