= Ýolöten =

City in Mary Province, Turkmenistan

Ýolöten Ýolöten şäheri
- City
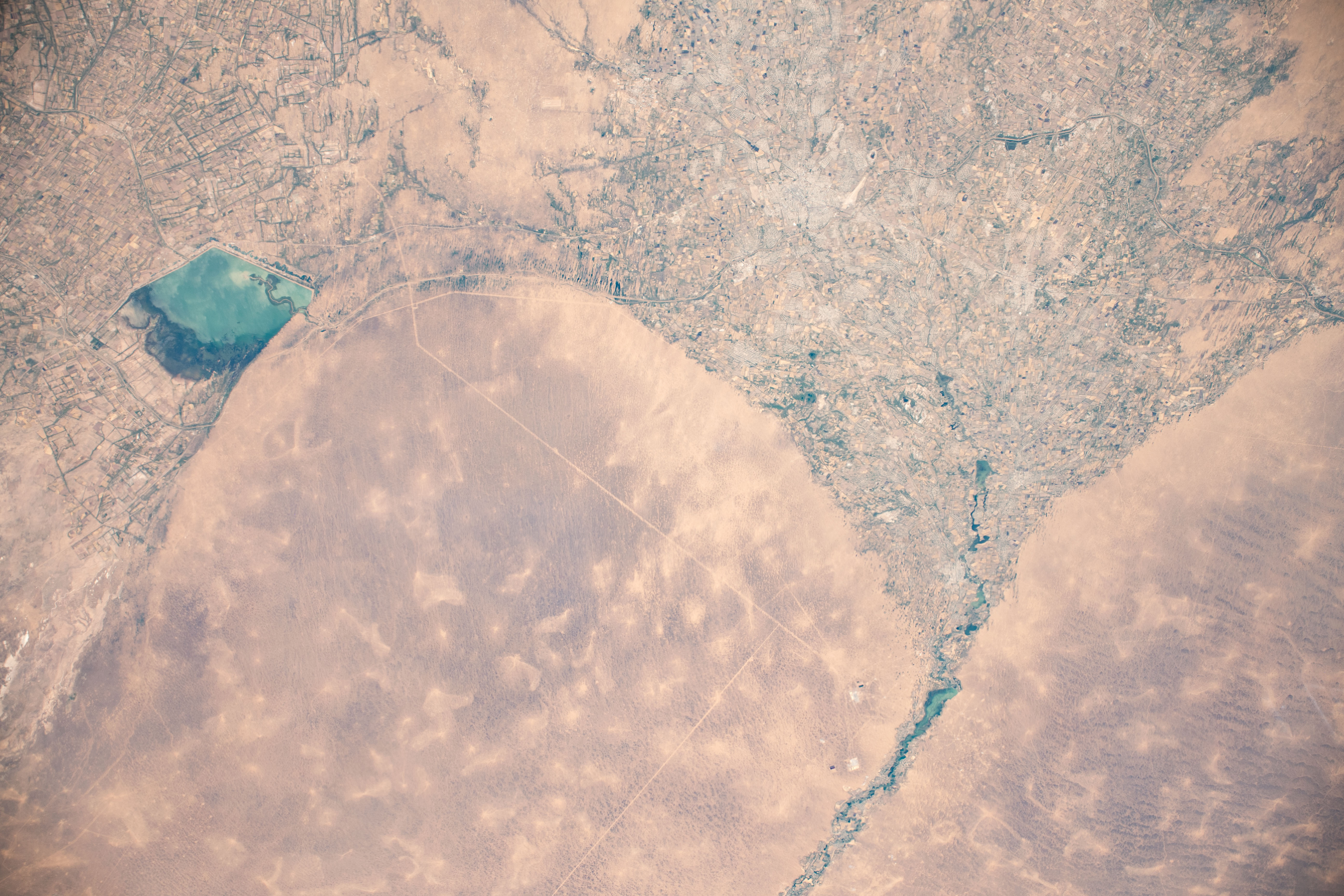
- View above Ýolöten

- Location within Turkmenistan
- Coordinates: 37°18′N 62°21′E
- Country: Turkmenistan
- Province: Mary Province
- District: Ýolöten District
- Elevation: 853 ft (260 m)

Population (2022 official census)
  - Total: 30,709
- Time zone: UTC+05:00 (TMT)

Ýolöten (Turkmen pronunciation: [ˌjoːlœˈtøn]) is the capital city of Ýolöten District, Mary Province, Turkmenistan. The city is located in the delta of the Murghab River, 55 kilometres (34 mi) southeast of Mary. It was granted the status of a city in 1939. In 2022, it had a population of 30,709 people.

== Etymology ==
Atanyýazow attributes the name to the settlement's location on the Silk Road between ancient Merv and Herat. The words ýol and öten mean "road" and "past" in Turkmen, respectively, i.e., "a place to cross".

== Transportation ==
Ýolöten lies on the Mary-Serhetabat railway line, and at the junction of the A-388 highway connecting Mary and Serhetabat and the P-25 highway connecting Ýolöten to Baýramaly.

== Population ==
In 1989 the city had a population of 18,644, with a total of some 35,000 in the city plus the surrounding district. The 2009 estimate is 37,705.

== Economy ==
Ýolöten is the nearest city to the Galkynysh Gas Field, formerly known as the Iolotan or South Yolotan–Osman field, the second-largest gas field in the world, and support of natural gas operations is a major part of the city's economy. It is also a center for agricultural product processing, due to its location in the Murghab River oasis.

== Notable people ==
- Ramis Bahshaliyev (born 1971), World Powerlifting Champion

== See also ==
- Cities of Turkmenistan
- List of municipalities in Mary Province
