= Wekilbazar District =

Wekilbazar District Wekilbazaar Etraby
- District
- Interactive map of Wekilbazar District
- Country: Turkmenistan
- Province: Mary Province
- Capital: Mollanepes

Area
  - Total: 3,518 sq mi (9,112 km^{2})

Population (2022 census)
  - Total: 124,642
  - Density: 35.43/sq mi (13.68/km^{2})
- Time zone: UTC+5

Wekilbazar District is a district of Mary Province in Turkmenistan. The administrative center of the district is the town of Mollanepes.

== Administrative Subdivisions ==
- Cities (şäherler)
  - N/A
- Towns (şäherçeler)
  - Mollanepes (inc. Üçdepe)
  - Wekilbazar
- Village councils (geňeşlikler)
  - A. (Alladurdy) Gandymow adyndaky (Watan)
  - Akgoňur (Goňur, Akgoňur, Narlyoba, Ýagtylyk)
  - Çarlakýap (Çarlakýap, Aýgyt, Diňli,
  - Egrigüzer (Egrigüzer, Bent)
  - Goňur (Garagoňur, Nurana)
  - Gökje (Arzuw, Bagşy, Garagökje)
  - Halyl (Halyl)
  - J. (Jumadurdy) Atajanow adyndaky (J.Atajanow adyndaky, Çebişgen, Garajaköw, Haşyrdyk, Işçi)
  - Mülkamaşa (Magtymguly adyndaky, Kümüşçi)
  - Mollanepes adyndaky (Gara)
  - Mülkbükri (Mülkbükri)
  - Mülkýusup (Parahatlyk, Kaklydepe, Mülkýusup)
  - Rysgally (Türkmenistan, Göreş)
  - Täzedurmuş (Täzedurmuş, Döwletli)

== Awards ==
Wekilbazar District won the award of "best district" in the country for 2017.
