= Sakarçäge District =

Sakarçäge District Sakarçäge etraby
- District
- Interactive map of Sakarçäge District
- Country: Turkmenistan
- Province: Mary Province
- Capital: Sakarçäge

Area
  - Total: 4,430 sq mi (11,480 km^{2})

Population (2022 census)
  - Total: 196,202
  - Density: 44.26/sq mi (17.09/km^{2})
- Time zone: UTC+5 (+5)

Sakarçäge District is a district of Mary Province in Turkmenistan. The administrative center of the district is the town of Sakarçäge.

Founded in December 1938 as Sakarçäge, it moved to Mary at November 1939. Sakarçäge was abolished in January 1963, but the following year it was restored in direct submission to the Turkmen SSR government. In December 1970, it rejoined Mary, where it was in place until this day.

== Administrative Subdivisions ==
- Cities (şäherler)
  - Sakarçäge
  - Şatlyk
- Towns (şäherçeler)
  - Döwletli zaman
  - Parahat
- Village councils (geňeşlikler)
  - Altyn zaman (Lälezar)
  - Agzybir (Arkadag, Agzybir)
  - Akýap (Akýap, Çetili)
  - Bereket (Bereket)
  - Çaşgyn (Çaşgyn)
  - Çerkezköl (Çerkezköl)
  - Daýhan (Dogryýol, Alajagöz)
  - Garaýap (Garaýap)
  - Gökhan (Gökhan, Aýhan, Daghan, Günhan)
  - Gorgangala (Bagşy)
  - Görelde (Görelde, Aýnaköl)
  - Gumgüzer (Gumgüzer, Dörtguýy, Garybata)
  - Gülüstan (Hakykat, Gülüstan)
  - Gyzylgum (Böri, D. (Daňatar) Sähedow adyndaky, Gyzylgum, Mawyteber)
  - Hojadepe (Hojadepe)
  - Keseýap (Keseýap)
  - Merdana (Azatlyk)
  - Sakarçäge (Düýedarçylyk, Gökgümmez)
  - Soltanyz (Soltanyz, Kyrköýli)
  - Söýünsary (Söýünsary)
  - Ýyldyzhan (Ýyldyzhan)
