= Baýramaly District =

Baýramaly District Baýramaly Etraby
- District
- Interactive map of Baýramaly District
- Country: Turkmenistan
- Province: Mary Province
- Capital: Baýramaly

Area
  - Total: 4,010 sq mi (10,390 km^{2})

Population (2022 census)
  - Total: 170,462
  - Density: 42.49/sq mi (16.41/km^{2})
- Time zone: UTC+5 (+5)

Baýramaly District is a district of Mary Province in Turkmenistan. The administrative center of the district is the town of Baýramaly.

Formed in 1925, it came under direct control of the central government of the Turkmen SSR in Ashgabat after the region of Merv was abolished in 1926; control was then transferred to the newly-formed regional government of Mary Region in November 1939.

December 12, 1957 saw the absorption of the district of Vekil-Bazar into this district.

It came under direct control of the central government for the second time in 1963 when the past Mary Region was abolished; control by the regional government only resumed in 1970, when Mary Region gets restored.

In August 1988, this district was abolished, only for it to be restored in 1992 and became what is it today.

== Administrative Subdivisions ==
- Cities (şäherler)
  - N/A
  - (Baýramaly, while not being part of the district, is its administrative centre)
- Towns (şäherçeler)
  - Bagtyýarlyk (Formerly Ücajy)
  - Berkarar
  - Mekan
- Village councils (geňeşlikler)
  - Agaýusup adyndaky (Şöhrat, Daýhan, Döwletli)
  - Azat (Azat, Dogryýap, Harazly, Pagtasaraý, Türkmenistan)
  - Bagt (Bagt, Kenar, Çöplidepe, Täzegüýç)
  - Bahar (Bahar, Baglyoba)
  - Beýikköpri (Beýikköpri, Depgin, Düýeçöken, Kanal, Odunçy)
  - Erkana (Erkana, Göksuw)
  - Gadyrýap (Gadyrýap, Çepekýap, Erikli, Galkynyş)
  - Gatakar (Aryk, Görelde, Mülk, Türkmen Goşun)
  - Guşlyoba (Guşlyoba, Gutlamgala, Gurbangala, Çöpli)
  - Hangala (Garaýörme)
  - Höwesli (Höwesli, Kyrkdepe)
  - Merw (Merw, Gäwürgala)
  - Murgap (Murgap, Ylham, Tutly)
  - Ýalkym (Ýalkym, Bereket, Rafsanjani, Şereket, Täzeoba, Tokaýly, Uçgun, Ýaýlak. Ýylgynly)
