= Türkmengala District =

Türkmengala District Türkmengala etraby
- District
- Interactive map of Türkmengala District
- Country: Turkmenistan
- Province: Mary
- Seat: Türkmengala

Area
  - Total: 9,112 km^{2} (3,518 sq mi)

Population (2022)
  - Total: 124,642
  - Density: 13.68/km^{2} (35.43/sq mi)
- Time zone: UTC+5 (+5)

Türkmengala District (Turkmen: Türkmengala etraby) is a district in Mary Province of Turkmenistan. Spread over an area of 9,112 km^{2} (3,518 sq mi), it had a population of 124,642 in 2022.

== Geography ==
Türkmengala is one of the nine districts in Mary Province of Turkmenistan. It is spread over an area of 9,112 km^{2} (3,518 sq mi), none of which is forested. Turkmengala elects its own member to the Assembly of Turkmenistan (Mejlis).

=== Administrative subdivisions ===
The district is administratively sub-divided into the city (şäherler) of Türkmengala, the urban area (şäherçeler) of Zähmet, and 12 village councils (geňeşliklers) consisting of 41 villages. In July 2016, the Government of Turkmenistan re-organized and renamed towns and villages in the country including those in the Türkmengala district. In November 2022, the National Council of Turkmenistan adopted a resolution that merged Tyazebirleshik village of the Kemine adyndaky village council with Kemine village, and Sarygoba of the Soltanyap village council with Yildiz.

== Demographics ==
According to the 2022 population and housing census, Türkmengala district had a population of 124,642, of whom 62,834 were male and 61,808 were female. About 104,091 (83.5%) of the inhabitants resided in rural and the remaining 20,551 (16.5%) living in urban areas. Of the urban population, 16,696 resided in the city of Türkmengala and the rest 3,855 in Zähmet.

== Economy ==
Agriculture is a major economic activity in the district, with the district being a center for cotton and wheat production. In 2018, the district produced 29,200 tonnes of cotton. The district is home to the Turkmenbashi Cotton Spinning Factory. Wheat is used to manufacture wheat flour and pasta. The district has four granaries with a storage capacity of 3,000 tonnes each. In 2026, the district produced 38,300 tons of flour and 14,000 tons of pasta products.
