= Bagtyýarlyk, Baýramaly =

Bagtyýarlyk Bagtyýarlyk şäherçesi
- Location in Turkmenistan
- Coordinates: 38°05′20″N 62°47′50″E
- Country: Turkmenistan
- Province: Mary Province
- District: Baýramaly District

Population (2022 official census)
  - Total: 1,727
- Time zone: UTC+5

Bagtyýarlyk, formerly known as Üçajy (romanized Russian Uch-Adzhi), is a town in Baýramaly District, Mary Province, Turkmenistan. The town was known as Üçajy (Cyrillic Turkmen Үчаҗы) until 20 September 2012, when by Parliamentary Resolution No. 331-IV it was renamed Bagtyýarlyk. In 2022, it had a population of 1,727 people.

== Etymology ==
The original name of the settlement is a compound of two words, üç and ajy, which mean "three" and "bitter", respectively. Atanyyazow explains that the first three water wells drilled here, when the rail line was being extended to Çärjew, yielded bitter water, hence the name, which was later applied to the town and a nearby state farm. The word bagtyýarlyk simply means "having luck or happiness". This name stems from the Persian word "Bakhtyar" (بختیار) meaning "luck or happiness", plus the suffix "-lyk", denoting one who has luck or happiness.

== Climate ==
The record high temperature of 48.4 °C (119.1 °F) was registered on July 7, 2021.

Climate data for Bagtyýarlyk (1991-2020 normals, coordinates:38°05′19″N 62°48′19″E)
Month	Jan	Feb	Mar	Apr	May	Jun	Jul	Aug	Sep	Oct	Nov	Dec	Year
Mean maximum °C (°F)	20.5 (68.9)	23.5 (74.3)	30.9 (87.6)	36.8 (98.2)	41.1 (106.0)	44.2 (111.6)	45.9 (114.6)	44.3 (111.7)	40.5 (104.9)	35.3 (95.5)	28 (82)	21.6 (70.9)	45.9 (114.6)
Daily mean °C (°F)	3.5 (38.3)	5.8 (42.4)	11.8 (53.2)	18.7 (65.7)	25.5 (77.9)	31 (88)	33 (91)	30.7 (87.3)	24.1 (75.4)	16.2 (61.2)	8.8 (47.8)	4.3 (39.7)	17.8 (64.0)
Mean minimum °C (°F)	−10 (14)	−9 (16)	−3.4 (25.9)	2.9 (37.2)	9.3 (48.7)	14.6 (58.3)	17.5 (63.5)	13.5 (56.3)	6.4 (43.5)	−1.9 (28.6)	−6.9 (19.6)	−9.4 (15.1)	−10 (14)
Average precipitation mm (inches)	21.4 (0.84)	22.8 (0.90)	27.6 (1.09)	16.3 (0.64)	9 (0.4)	1 (0.0)	0.3 (0.01)	0.1 (0.00)	0.9 (0.04)	4.4 (0.17)	14.2 (0.56)	11.7 (0.46)	129.7 (5.11)
Average precipitation days (≥ 1 mm)	12.2	14.5	15.8	10.6	5.8	0.9	0.3	0.1	0.7	2.8	8.9	8.4	81
Source: NOAA

== Transportation ==
The M37 highway passes through the town. It is also served by a station on the Trans-Caspian Railway.
