= Ýolöten District =

Coordinates: 37.2954°N 62.3625°E

Ýolöten etraby
- District
- Interactive map of Ýolöten etraby
- Country: Turkmenistan
- Province: Mary Province
- Capital: Ýolöten

Area
  - Total: 3,350 sq mi (8,677 km^{2})

Population (2022 census)
  - Total: 155,616
  - Density: 46.45/sq mi (17.93/km^{2})
- Time zone: UTC+5 (+5)

Ýolöten District is a district of Mary Province in Turkmenistan. The administrative center of the district is the town of Ýolöten.

== History ==
Formed in January 1926 as Iolotan Raion, its location is in Merv District of the Turkmen Soviet Socialist Republic. In July the same year, Merv District is abolished, and as a result Iolotan became directly subordinate to the Turkmen SSR.

In November 1939, Iolotan is included into Mary Oblast. However, in 1963, Mary is also abolished, and Iolotan is once again subordinate to the Turkmen SSR.

In December 1970, Iolotan rejoins the restored Mary Oblast that was previously abolished in 1963. In 1992, Iolotan was renamed into its current name Ýolöten and became part of Mary Province.

== Etymology ==
Atanyyazow attributes the name to the settlement's location on the Silk Road between ancient Merv and Herat. The words ýol and öten mean "road" and "past" in Turkmen, respectively, i.e., "a place to cross".

== Administrative subdivisions ==
- Cities (şäherler)
  - Ýolöten
- Towns (şäherçeler)
  - N/A
- Village councils (geňeşlikler)
  - Agzybirlik (Söýünalybedeň, Agzybirlik, Täzeýap)
  - Ahunbaba (Zindigani, Alamdepe, Bagtyýarlyk, Tokaýçy)
  - Akgüzer (Akgüzer, Bozýatan, Lälezar)
  - Arkadag (Azatlyk)
  - Baýraç (Janybek, Ýerki, Galkynyş)
  - Döwletli (Döwletli)
  - Gammarbaba (Ýeňiş, Gammarbaba, Gammarýap)
  - Goýunjy (Goýunjy, Gadyr)
  - Garaköl (Garaköl, Gazyklybent)
  - Hakykat (Hakykat)
  - Hüjüm (Hüjüm, Bereket)
  - Momataý (Momataý, Talhatanbaba, Üçköpri)
  - Rahat (Awçy, Alnyş, Gulanly, Rahatýap)
  - Soltanbent (Dostluk, Daýhanbent, Hojaköw, Soltanbent, Şark, Täzeýer)
  - Şöhrat (Şöhrat)
  - Ymambaba (Ymambaba, Nyýazow adyndaky)
  - Ýokary Suhty (Ýokary Suhty, Altyn toprak, Atçapar, Gojaly, Taňrygazan)
