= Murgap District, Turkmenistan =

Murgap District Murgap etraby 1961- Stalin etraby 1933-1961
- District
- Murgap etraby
- Interactive map of Murgap District
- Country: Turkmenistan
- Province: Mary Province
- Capital: Murgap

Area
  - Total: 2,327 sq mi (6,028 km^{2})

Population (2022 census)
  - Total: 190,218
  - Density: 81.73/sq mi (31.56/km^{2})
- Time zone: UTC+5

Murgap District is a district of Mary Province in Turkmenistan. The administrative center of the district is the town of Murgap.

Founded as Stalin District in February 1935, this district joined Mary four years later, in November 1939. Twenty-two years later, it was renamed to its current name, Murgap, as part of a de-Stalinization campaign. It was administered directly by the Turkmen SSR government after Mary dissolved in January 1963.

In December 1970, Murgap joined Mary again, where it stays until this day.

== Administrative Subdivisions ==
- Cities (şäherler)
  - Murgap
- Towns (şäherçeler)
  - Deňizhan (inc. Kiçi Hanhowuz, Sähra)
  - Oguzhan
- Village councils (geňeşlikler)
  - Azatlyk (Köşk)
  - Birleşik (Birleşik)
  - Çäçdepe (Çäçdepe)
  - Çöňür (Çöňür, Arygoba, Täzeoba)
  - Dostluk (Dostluk)
  - Deňizhan (Deňizhan, Agzybirlik)
  - Galkynyş (Çemçedepe)
  - Gatyýap (Gatyýap, Suhtyýap)
  - Gowşutbent (Penjiwar, Akýer, Garaşsyzlyk, Bentlioba)
  - Gökdepe (Gökdepe, Amaşaýap)
  - G. (Gylyçdurdy) Sähetmyradow adyndaky (G.Sähetmyradow adyndaky)
  - H. (Hyrslan) Jumaýew adyndaky (H.Jumaýew adyndaky)
  - Miras (Gowkuzereň)
  - Mülkýazy (Mülkýazy, Gökleň, Gülperi)
  - Rowaçlyk (Rowaçlyk, Amaşa)
  - Suhty (Suhty, Goşaköpri, Mülkaman, Birleşik)
  - Şordepe (Şordepe, Meýletinlik, Ýagtylyk
  - Watan (Daşaýak, Watan)
  - Ylham (Gojukkölýap)
