= Mary District =

District in Mary Province, Turkmenistan

Mary District Mary etraby
- District
- Interactive map of Mary District
- Country: Turkmenistan
- Province: Mary Province
- Capital: Mary

Area
  - Total: 522 sq mi (1,352 km^{2})

Population (2022 census)
  - Total: 173,140
  - Density: 331.7/sq mi (128.1/km^{2})
- Time zone: UTC+5 (+5)

Mary District (Turkmen: Mary etraby) is a district of Mary Province in Turkmenistan. The administrative center of the district is the town of Mary.

== Administrative Subdivisions ==
- Cities (şäherler)
  - N/A
  - (Mary, while not being part of the district, is its administrative centre)
- Towns (şäherçeler)
  - Peşanaly
- Village councils (geňeşlikler)
  - Abadanlyk (Garadepe, Akgoňur)
  - Adalat (Arykperreň)
  - Ak altyn (Gurama)
  - Akmyrat Hümmedow adyndaky (Hojaýap, Goşaja)
  - Akybaý (Akybaý)
  - A.Mämmedowa adyndaky (A.Mämmedowa adyndaky, Ýaýlagaraahmet, Gurtzäkir)
  - Aşgabat (Gowkyzereň, Ata, Egrigüzer, 8-nji Mart,
  - G.Atabaýew adyndaky (Döwletli)
  - Babasary (Babasary)
  - Diýar (Kelteler, Garainjik)
  - Jemgyýet (Müjewür, Hanutamyş, Jemgyýet)
  - Mukry Lorsy adyndaky (Mukry Lorsy)
  - Peşanaly (Jar)
  - Ruhubelent (Mülksyçmaz)
  - Täzegüýç (Täze oba, Aköýli, Söýünaly)
  - Türkmen ýoly (Gojuklar)
