= Baýramaly =

City in Mary Province, Turkmenistan

Baýramaly Baýramaly şäheri
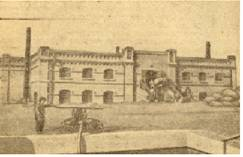
- Baýramaly in the late 1800s

- Location in Turkmenistan
- Coordinates: 37°37′N 62°09′E
- Country: Turkmenistan
- Province: Mary Province
- District: Baýramaly District

Area
  - Total: 28.94 km^{2} (11.17 sq mi)
- Elevation: 233 m (764 ft)

Population (2022 census)
  - Total: 70,376
  - Density: 2,432/km^{2} (6,298/sq mi)
- Time zone: UTC+5 (+5)
- Area code: +993 564

Baýramaly (formerly Bayram-Ali, also spelled Bairam Ali; earlier Bahrām Ali; Turkmen: Baýramaly) is a city in and the seat of Baýramaly District, Mary Province, Turkmenistan. It lies about 27 km east of the provincial capital Mary, along the main railway line from Ashgabat to Tashkent. In 2022, its population was 70,376 (up from 43,824 in the 1989 census).

The modern city of Baýramaly was established in 1887 as part of the Murgab Imperial Estate, a property of the Russian crown. Over the following decades, the town experienced rapid growth, with the Russian Empire investing in factories, irrigation systems, hospitals, orchards, nurseries, and parks. It became a symbol of the Russian Empire's "civilizing mission" in Central Asia and was prominently featured in Russian propaganda to showcase the empire's ability to transform inhospitable environments. However, in later years, the project was exposed as a sham. In particular, Count K. K. Pahlen, in his report on travels to Russian Turkestan, revealed that the glorified photographs of the Baýramaly estate had been staged "to present a rosy picture to the Tsar."

== Etymology ==
The city is named after Bayram 'Ali Khan Qajar, the most prominent ruler of the Qajar Principality of Merv. According to Atanyyazow, Bayramaly ruled Mary in the 18th century, from 1782 to 1785, although the actual length of his reign remains disputed. (Note: The length of his reign is disputed. Mir 'Abd al-Karim Bukhari states he reigned from 1782 to 1785. However, William Wood considers that to be a typo; Bayram 'Ali Khan's son, Hajji Mohammad Husayn, states he either reigned for 31 years or 50 years. Mohammad Sadeq Mervezi states that Bayram 'Ali Khan was chosen by the local leaders to lead after the collapse of the Afsharids (sometime after 1747). Christine Noelle-Karimi doesn't give a specific date, but mentions that Bayram 'Ali Khan's father Shah Qoli Beg Qajar was appointed governor in c.1741, and that by 1751 'Ali Naqi Khan Qajar was ruler of Merv before it switched to Bayram 'Ali Khan.)

== Overview ==
The city is located in a dry oasis formed by the Murghab River. Baýramaly is a climatic spa and visitors are often sent to the city for treatment of chronic kidney disease, acute forms of nephritis and nephrosis, hypertension, renal tuberculosis, and problems of blood circulation. The Baýramaly Sanitorium (Turkmen: Baýramaly Şypahanasy) has been in operation since 1933. In 2010 the sanitorium underwent renovation and two new buildings were added. The sanitorium specializes in ailments of the kidneys and urinary tract, diseases of the cardiovascular system, and diseases of the musculoskeletal system.

== Climate ==
Baýramaly has a cold desert climate (Köppen climate classification BWk), with cool winters and very hot summers. Rainfall is generally light and erratic, and occurs mainly in the winter and autumn months.

Climate data for Baýramaly (1991-2020, extremes 1885-present)
Month	Jan	Feb	Mar	Apr	May	Jun	Jul	Aug	Sep	Oct	Nov	Dec	Year
Record high °C (°F)	28.0 (82.4)	31.8 (89.2)	37.2 (99.0)	40.5 (104.9)	45.5 (113.9)	46.3 (115.3)	47.5 (117.5)	45.7 (114.3)	44.0 (111.2)	41.0 (105.8)	35.2 (95.4)	29.0 (84.2)	47.5 (117.5)
Mean daily maximum °C (°F)	10.1 (50.2)	12.6 (54.7)	18.6 (65.5)	25.6 (78.1)	32.0 (89.6)	36.8 (98.2)	38.6 (101.5)	37.0 (98.6)	31.9 (89.4)	25.1 (77.2)	16.8 (62.2)	11.1 (52.0)	24.7 (76.4)
Daily mean °C (°F)	4.3 (39.7)	6.4 (43.5)	12.0 (53.6)	18.5 (65.3)	24.8 (76.6)	28.7 (83.7)	31.5 (88.7)	29.3 (84.7)	23.6 (74.5)	16.7 (62.1)	9.9 (49.8)	5.3 (41.5)	17.6 (63.6)
Mean daily minimum °C (°F)	0.0 (32.0)	1.5 (34.7)	6.4 (43.5)	12.0 (53.6)	17.3 (63.1)	21.6 (70.9)	23.7 (74.7)	21.1 (70.0)	15.2 (59.4)	9.3 (48.7)	4.2 (39.6)	1.0 (33.8)	11.1 (52.0)
Record low °C (°F)	−26.3 (−15.3)	−24.8 (−12.6)	−16.8 (1.8)	−3.6 (25.5)	2.2 (36.0)	7.6 (45.7)	11.7 (53.1)	7.4 (45.3)	−1.8 (28.8)	−8.3 (17.1)	−21.5 (−6.7)	−23.0 (−9.4)	−26.3 (−15.3)
Average precipitation mm (inches)	22.4 (0.88)	29.0 (1.14)	34.2 (1.35)	23.5 (0.93)	10 (0.4)	0.9 (0.04)	0.0 (0.0)	0.3 (0.01)	0.5 (0.02)	5.5 (0.22)	16.0 (0.63)	14.8 (0.58)	157.1 (6.19)
Average precipitation days (≥ 0.1 mm)	7.2	6.2	5.9	3.8	2.3	0.5	0.2	0.3	0.3	2.2	5.1	6.1	40.1
Average relative humidity (%)	73.5	67.3	57.7	51.6	40.6	31.7	30.3	29.4	34.7	46.1	63.1	72.8	49.9
Mean monthly sunshine hours	120.9	131.9	165.4	210.3	288.4	337.3	358.8	344.5	294.7	240.2	157.6	120.8	2,770.8
Source 1: Pogoda.ru.net, climatebase.ru (precipitation days-humidity)
Source 2: NOAA

== Economy ==
The economy is based around food and construction materials industries. Natural gas is also extracted in the area.

== Sights ==
- Close to Baýramaly are the ruins of ancient Merv.
- 28 kilometres (17 mi) to the north is the mausoleum of Hudaýnazar Öwlüýä (early 12th century).

== Notable people ==
- Mähri Hojaniyazova
- Nury Halmammedov
- Suleyman Nazarov Berdiyevich
- Dzhamaldin Khodzhaniyazov
- Alvina Shpady
