= Mary Region =

Region of Turkmenistan

Coordinates: 37°0′N 62°0′E

Mary Mary Welaýaty
- Region
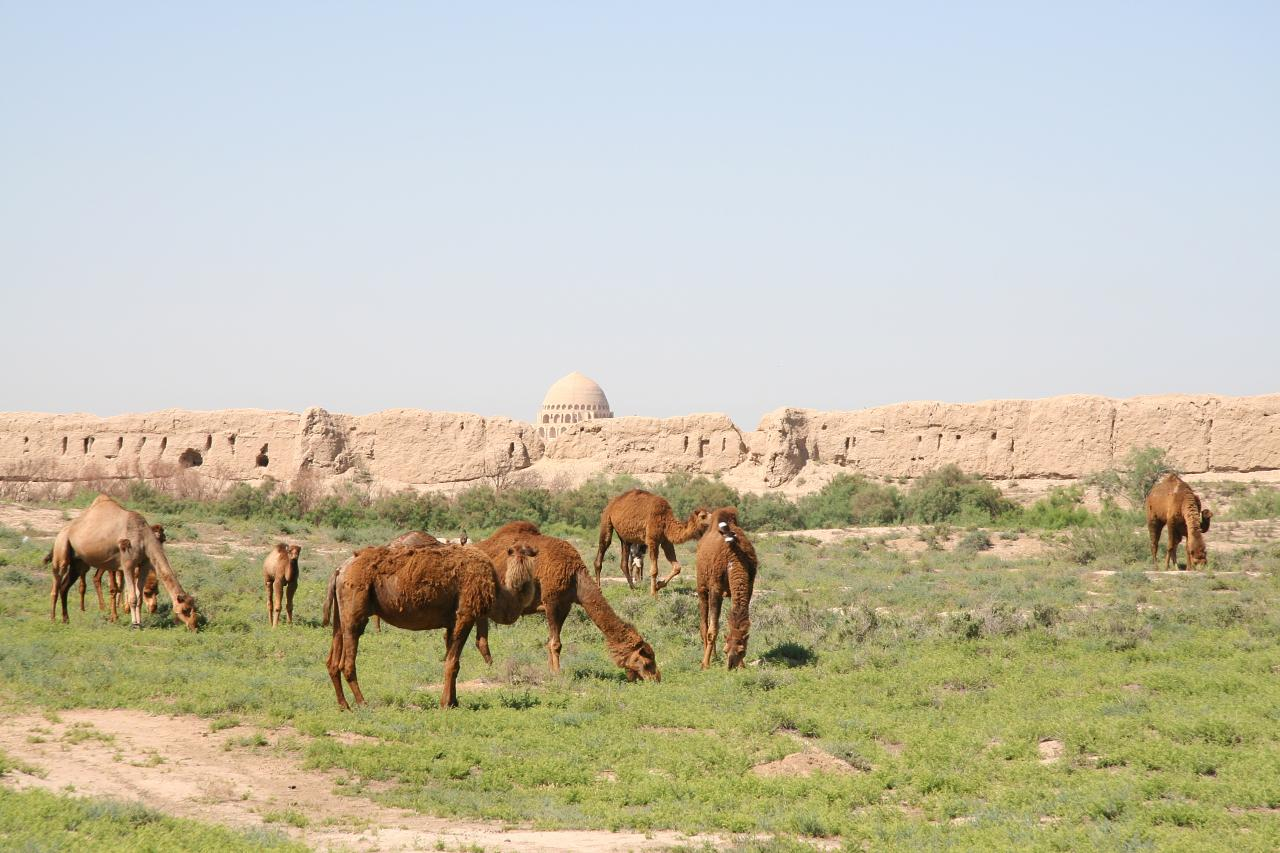
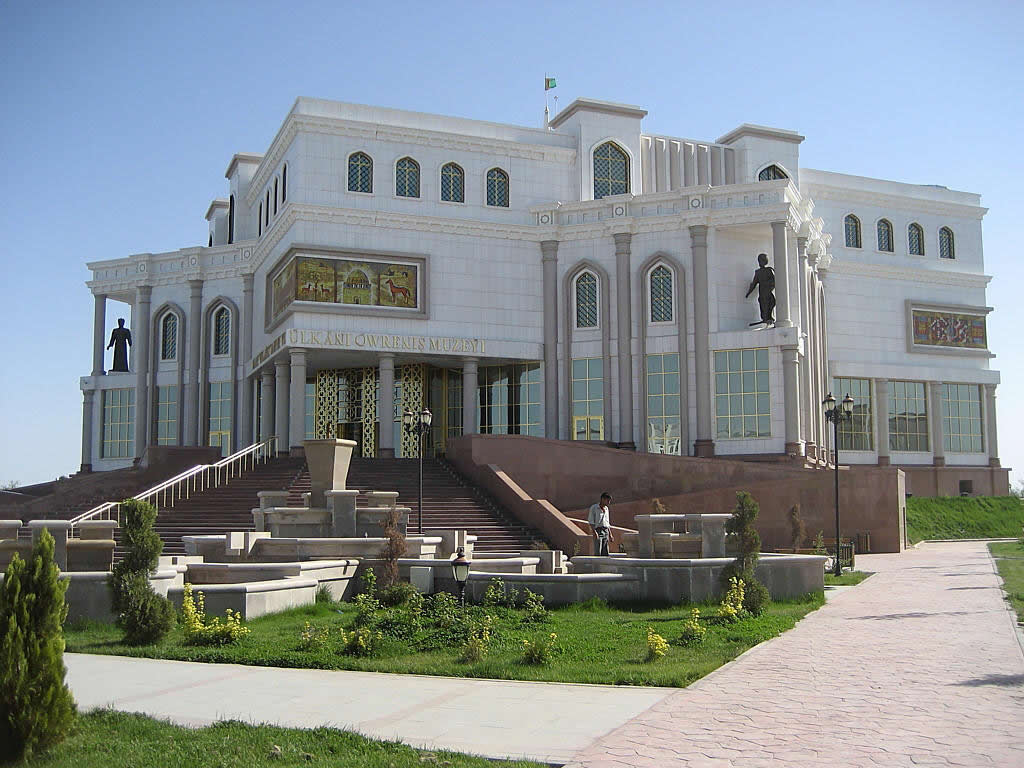
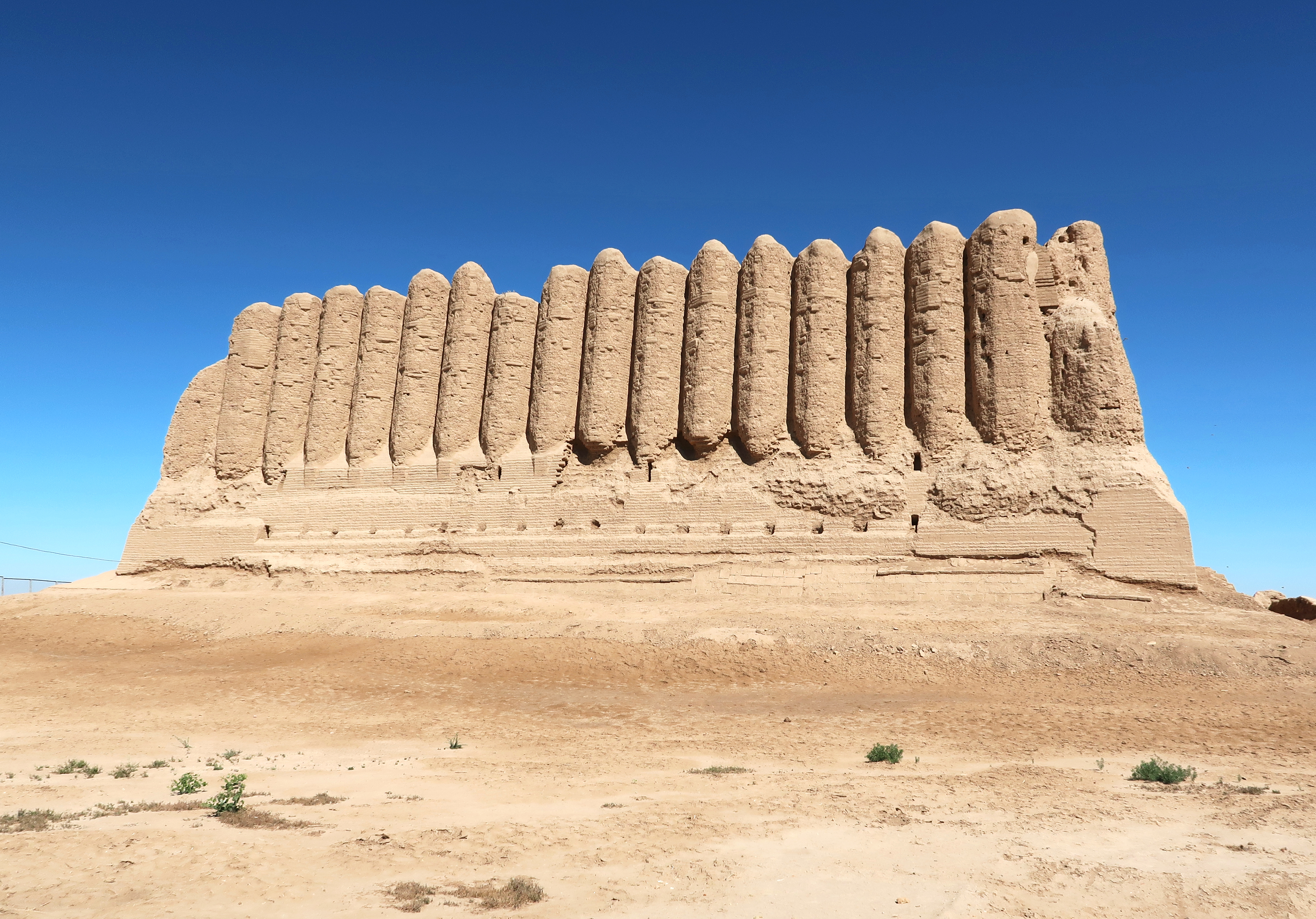
- From the top, Landscape of the Mary Region, Mary Museum, Kyz Kala Fortress

- Mary region in Turkmenistan
- Country: Turkmenistan
- Capital: Mary

Area
  - Total: 87,150 km^{2} (33,650 sq mi)

Population (2022 census)
  - Total: 1,613,386
  - Density: 18.51/km^{2} (47.95/sq mi)
- Website: maryhakimlik.gov.tm/tm

Mary Region (Turkmen: Mary welaýaty) is one of five provinces in Turkmenistan. It is located in the south-east of the country, bordering Afghanistan. Its capital is the city of Mary. Its area is 87,150 km^{2} (33,650 sq mi) and population 1,613,386 (2022 census). The average population density is about 15 persons per square kilometer, but it reaches 150–200 per square kilometer in the most developed oases.

In 2000, Mary Region accounted for 23% of Turkmenistan's population, 19% of the total number of employed, 26% of agricultural production (by value), and 21% of the country's total industrial production. The region's industries include natural gas extraction (the Galkynysh Gas Field), electric power generation, textiles, carpet weaving, chemical and food industry. In 2001 it accounted for 74% of Turkmenistan's electricity generation, and 26% of natural gas extraction.

Agriculture in Mary Region is irrigated by the Karakum Canal, which runs east to west through the center of the province, and by the Murghab River, which runs south to north, entering the province from Afghanistan. While the northern portion of the province is within the Central Asian southern desert ecoregion, the southern portion of the province is characterized by a savanna of pistachio and desert sedges, classified as the Badkhiz-Karabil semi-desert by the World Wildlife Fund.

Ancient Merv, designated a UNESCO World Heritage Site, is the main archeological attraction of Mary Province. This is one of the best-preserved oasis cities on the ancient Silk Road.

The capital of Mary Region is the city of Mary, located at the intersection of Murghab River with the Karakum Canal. Other major cities are Baýramaly (Russian: Байрам-Али), Ýolöten (Iolotan, Russian: Иолотань), and Serhetabat (Russian: Серхетабад, formerly Turkmen: Guşgy, Russian: Кушка) on the border with Afghanistan.

== Demographic ==
=== Table of National composition of the population of Mary region (2022) ===
Table:

Ethnicity	Total		Urban		Rural	
Ethnicity	Population	%	Population	%	Population	%
Turkmens	1,485,844	92.10%	376,386	91.21%	1,109,458	92.40%
Baloch	85,384	5.29%	2,840	0.69%	82,544	6.88%
Russians	14,995	0.93%	14,319	3.47%	676	0.06%
Uzbeks	6,676	0.42%	6,299	1.53%	377	0.03%
Azerbaijanis	6,336	0.40%	5,509	1.34%	827	0.07%
Afghans	2,325	0.15%	184	0.05%	2,141	0.18%
Armenians	2,148	0.13%	2,109	0.51%	39	0.00%
Tatars	1,641	0.10%	1,481	0.36%	160	0.01%
Kazakhs	722	0.05%	471	0.11%	251	0.02%
Kurds	377	0.02%	230	0.06%	147	0.01%
Ukrainians	355	0.02%	319	0.08%	36	0.00%
Lezgins	153	0.00%	142	0.03%	11	0.00%
Karakalpaks	21	0.00%	19	0.00%	2	0.00%
Koreans	20	0.00%	17	0.00%	3	0.00%
other nationalities	1,671	0.10%	1,435	0.34%	236	0.02%
Total	1,617,352	100%	1,445,046	100%	172,306	100%

== Administrative divisions ==
=== Districts ===
As of 9 November 2022, Mary Province (Mary welaýaty) is subdivided into 9 districts (Turkmen: etrapy; etraplar (plural)):

1. Baýramaly District
2. Garagum District
3. Mary District
4. Murgap District
5. Sakarçäge District
6. Tagtabazar District
7. Türkmengala District
8. Wekilbazar District
9. Ýolöten District

By parliamentary decree of 9 November 2022, two districts, Oguzhan and Serhetabat, were abolished and their land distributed to other districts.

=== Municipalities ===
As of January 1, 2017, the province includes 8 cities (города or şäherler), 14 towns (посёлки or şäherçeler), 143 rural or village councils (сельские советы or geňeşlikler), and 329 villages (села, сельские населенные пункты or obalar).

In the list below, cities with "district status" are bolded:

- **Baýramaly**
- **Mary**
- Murgap
- Sakarçäge
- Şatlyk
- Serhetabat (formerly Guşga or Kuşka)
- Türkmengala
- Ýolöten
- Üçajy, town

== Economy ==
=== Agriculture ===
Mary Province: area and production of selected crops, 2017–2019
	area, thousand hectares			production, thousand tonnes		
	2017	2018	2019	2017	2018	2019
Cereals and legumes	223.0	181.4	182.6	409.8	286.4	422.4
Cotton	165.0	165.0	165.0	327.6	337.2	330.5
Vegetables	7.3	7.6	7.6	177.5	177.9	178.2

=== Industry ===
Mary Province: Production of selected industrial and processed goods, 2017–2019
	2017	2018	2019
Electricity, million kwh	8,074.7	8,260.8	8,831.7
Natural gas, billion m^{3}	20.6	24.8	26.6
Gas condensate, thousand tonnes	45.7	47.4	42.7
Mineral fertilizers, NPK basis, thousand tonnes	324.4	318.5	256.7
Bricks, million	179.3	178.0	201.6
Cotton lint, thousand tonnes	99.9	63.6	89.8,
Wool, degreased, thousand tonnes	4.0	4.0	4.0
Cotton yarn, thousand tonnes	17.3	17.9	19.1
Cotton textile, million m^{2}	43.6	46.0	47.2
Unrefined vegetable oil, thousand tonnes	25.3	26.0	13.2
Flour, thousand tonnes	168.0	176.6	173.6

== History ==
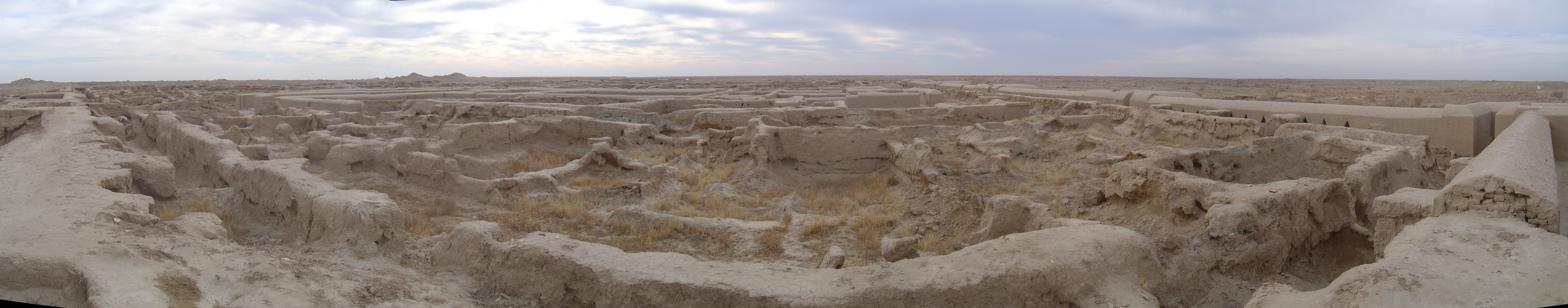
Panorama of the Margush ruins in Mary Province, Turkmenistan

=== Prehistory ===
Bronze Age and Iron Age finds support the probability of advanced civilizations in the area including finds associated with a society known to scholars as the Bactria-Margiana Archaeological Complex (BMAC) – near the modern city of Mary, and at the Jeitun and Gonur Tepe archeological sites.

=== Founding of Merv ===
Alexander the Great conquered the territory in the 4th century BC on his way to South Asia. In 330 BC, Alexander marched northward into Central Asia and founded the city of Alexandria Margiana (Merv) near the Murghab River. A busy Silk Road caravan route, connecting Tang dynasty China and the city of Baghdad (in modern Iraq), passed through Merv. The city of Merv was occupied by the lieutenants of the caliph Uthman ibn Affan, and was constituted as the capital of Khorasan. Using this city as their base, the Arabs, led by their commander Qutayba ibn Muslim, brought under subjection Balkh, Bokhara, Fergana and Kashgaria, and penetrated into China as far as the province of Gansu early in the 8th century.

Merv achieved some political spotlight in February 748 when Abu Muslim (d. 750) declared a new Abbasid dynasty at Merv, and set out from the city to conquer Iran and Iraq and establish a new capital at Baghdad. The goldsmith of Merv famously challenged Abu Muslim to do the right thing and not make war on fellow Muslims. The goldsmith was put to death.

In the latter part of the 8th century, Merv became obnoxious to Islam as the centre of heretical propaganda preached by al-Muqanna "The Veiled Prophet of Khorasan". Present Turkmenistan was ruled by Tahirids between 821 and 873. In 873, Arab rule in Central Asia came to an end due to the Saffarid conquest. During their dominion, Merv, like Samarkand and Bokhara, was one of the great schools of learning, and the celebrated historian Yaqut studied in its libraries. Merv produced several scholars in various branches of knowledge, such as Islamic law, Hadith, history, literature, and the like.

=== Arrival of the Turkmen ===
In 1055 Seljuk forces entered Baghdad, becoming masters of the Islamic heartlands and important patrons of Islamic institutions. Until these revolts, Turkmen tribesmen were an integral part of the Seljuk military forces. Turkmen migrated with their families and possessions on Seljuk campaigns into Azerbaijan and Anatolia, which began the Turkification of these areas. During this time, Turkmen also began to settle the area of present-day Turkmenistan. Prior to the Turkmen habitation, most of this desert had been uninhabited, while the more habitable areas along the Caspian Sea, Kopet Dag Mountains, Amu Darya, and Murghab River (Turkmen: Murgap deryasy) were populated predominantly by Iranians. The city-state of Merv was an especially large sedentary and agricultural area, important as both a regional economic-cultural center and a transit hub on the Silk Road. The last powerful Seljuk ruler, Sultan Sanjar (d. 1157), witnessed the fragmentation and destruction of the empire because of attacks by Turkmen and other tribes. During the reign of Sultan Sanjar or Sinjar of the same house, in the middle of the 11th century, Merv was overrun by the Turkish tribes of the Ghuzz from beyond the Oxus. It eventually passed under the sway of the rulers of Khwarezm (Khiva). After mixing with the settled peoples in today's Turkmenistan, the Oghuz living north of the Kopet Dag Mountains gradually became known as the Turkmen.

=== Mongols and Timurids ===
In 1157, the Seljuk dynasty came to an end in the province of Khorasan. The Turkic rulers of Khiva took control of the area of Turkmenistan, under the title of Khwarezmshah. In 1221, Central Asia suffered a disastrous invasion by Mongol warriors who swept across the region from their base in eastern Asia. Under their commander, Genghis Khan, founder of the Mongol Empire, the Mongols conquered Khwarezm and burned the city of Merv to the ground. The Mongol leader ordered the massacre of Merv's inhabitants as well as the destruction of the province's farms and irrigation works, which effectively ended the Iranian dominance in urban areas and agricultural communities of Khwarezm. These areas were soon repopulated by the Turkmen who survived the invasion and had retreated northward to the plains of Kazakhstan or westward to the shores of the Caspian Sea. After the division of the Mongol Empire, present Turkmenistan was passed to the Chagatai Khanate, except the southernmost part belonged to Ilkhanate.

=== Khiva and the Persians ===
The invasion of the Khan of Khiva, Abul Gazi Bahadur Khan, from 1645 to 1663, caused some difficulties to the Turkmens, coupled with the impact of the drought that occurred at about the same period. Most of the Turkmens within the khanate moved to Ahal, Atrek, Murgap and Tejen. Most of present-day Turkmenistan was divided between the Khanates of Khiva and Bukhara, except southernmost parts under Persian suzerainty. Nader of Persia conquered the entire region in 1740, but after his assassination in 1747 Turkmen lands were recaptured by the Uzbek khanates of Khiva and Bukhara. During the 1830s, the Teke Turkmen, then living on the Tejen River in today's Turkmen-Afghan borderlands, were forced by the Persians to migrate northward. Khiva contested the advance of the Tekes, but ultimately, by about 1856, the latter became the sovereign power of southern and southeastern parts of present Turkmenistan.

Lieutenant Colonel C.E. Stuart reported that in the 1830s the Teke tribe began to settle in the lower Murghab River delta near Merv, which, he said, they destroyed around 1855. From here the Teke extended their reach to Kizil-Arvat (today's city of Serdar), ultimately splitting into the Ahal Teke, located between Kizil-Arvat and Gawars (an area Stuart called "Daman-i-Kuh"), and the Merv (today Mary) Teke, mainly between the Tejen and Murghab Rivers. Edmund O'Donovan described Merv as of 1881 as

...a heap of melancholy ruins. There are remains of baths, and palaces, and ramparts crumbling around, with nothing living but snakes and jackals to be seen, or perhaps some wandering Turkoman looking out for his sheep...This is all that remains of Merv...

O'Donovan also asserted that as of 1881

The Turkomans of Merv have only been twenty-six years in the oasis. They formerly inhabited the district around Sarakhs on the upper part of the Tejend river. They were driven from there twenty-seven years ago by the Persians, who objected to the neighbourhood of persons so disagreeable as to insist in carrying off Persian men, their wives, and daughters, and selling them at 5L per head in Bokhara.

=== Russian Empire ===
Following Russia's defeat of the combined Ahal and Merv Teke army at the Battle of Geok-Tepe in 1881, Russian forces sought to pacify and occupy the area of today's Mary Region. Merv was taken in 1884, followed by Kushka (today's Serhetabat) in 1885. The latter precipitated the Panjdeh incident and very nearly a war between Russia and Great Britain, which feared Imperial Russia intended to push on through Afghanistan into India. A spur of the Trans-Caspian Railway was extended to Kushka, both to allow delivery and supply of troops guarding the border with Afghanistan, and to haul out cotton produced in the Murghab River valley.

=== Soviet period ===
Following the Russian Revolution, Soviet power was fully in place by 1924, when the Turkmen Soviet Socialist Republic was created. The name "Merv" was changed to "Mary" in 1937. The region initially was directly under control of the Turkmen SSR government, but in 1939 Mary oblast' (Russian: Mарыйская область, Turkmen: Mary oblasty) was created. It was abolished in 1963, then re-established in 1970.
