= Azerbaijanis in Turkmenistan =

Ethnic group in Turkmenistan

Azerbaijanis in Turkmenistan Türkmənistan azərbaycanlıları
Total population
- 33,365 (Census 1989)

Regions with significant populations
- Ashgabat, Türkmenbaşy, Baýramaly, Türkmenabat

Languages
- Azerbaijani • Turkmen • Russian

Religion
- Shia Islam

Related ethnic groups
- Azerbaijani diaspora

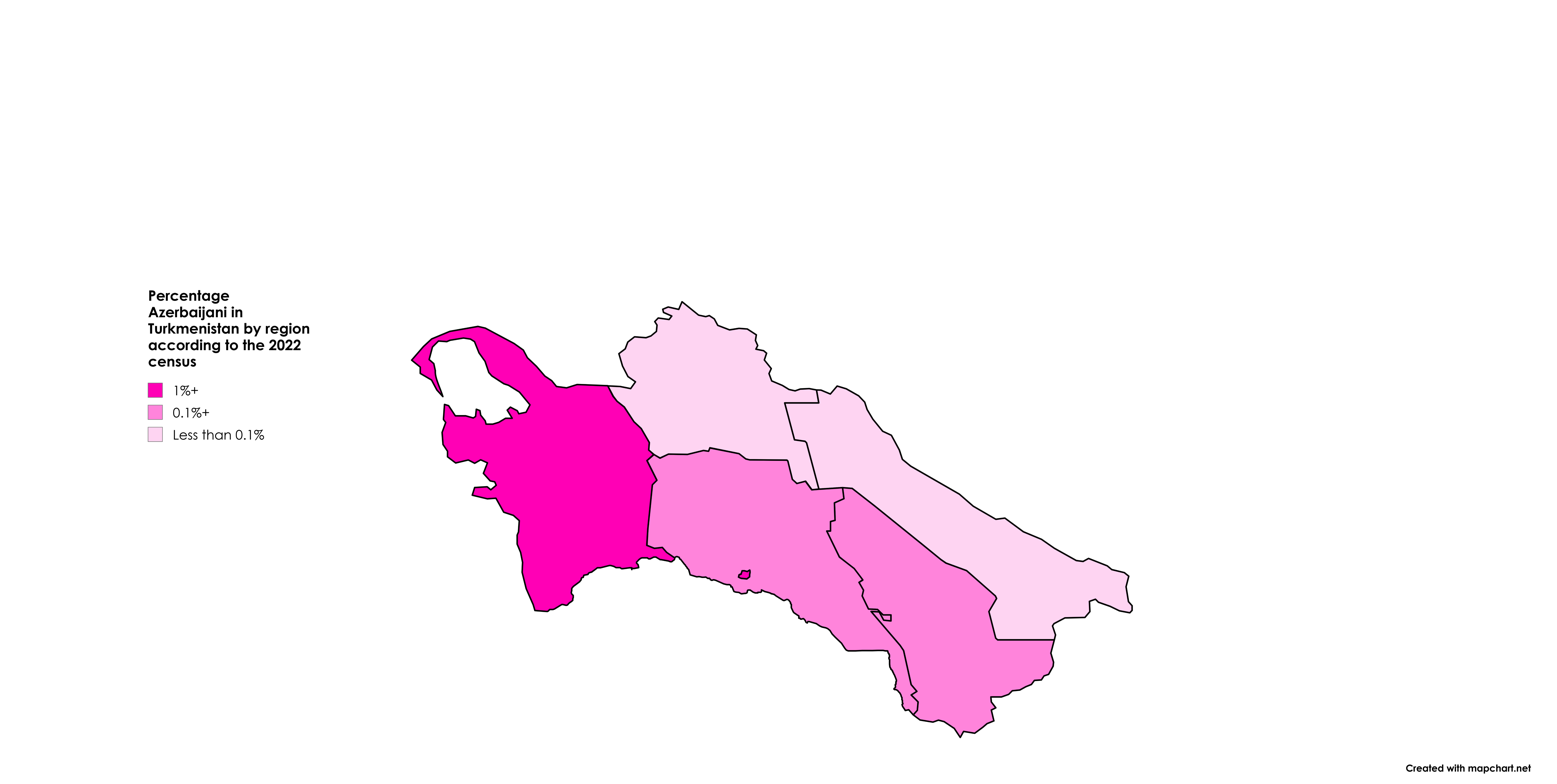
Percentage of Azerbaijanis in Turkmenistan by region

Azerbaijanis in Turkmenistan (Azerbaijani: Türkmənistan azərbaycanlıları) are part of the Azerbaijani diaspora. They are Turkmen citizens and permanent residents of ethnic Azerbaijani background. Azerbaijan and Turkmenistan used to be part of the Russian Empire and later the Soviet Union. As of the 2022 census, there were 26,576 Azerbaijanis in Turkmenistan.

== Demographics ==
Azerbaijanis in Turkmenistan live mainly in the coastal provinces of Turkmenbashi, the capital Ashgabat and Balkanabat. According to the 1926 census, 4.2 thousand Azerbaijanis lived there at that time. The period when the number of Azerbaijani population in the country was the largest was 1989. At that time, 33 thousand Azerbaijanis lived in the country. After the collapse of the Soviet Union and the independence of Turkmenistan, the migration of both Azerbaijanis and non-Turkmen to the outside of the country began. The reason for this was the need to return to one's motherland due to the bad economic situation in the country, as well as the changing political situation.

Population of Azerbaijanis in Turkmenistan to ethnic group 1926–1989
Ethnic group	census 1926^{1}		census 1939^{2}		census 1959^{3}		census 1970^{4}		census 1979^{5}		census 1989^{6}	
Ethnic group	4,229	0.4	7,442	0.6	12,868	0.8	16,775	0.8	23,548	0.9	33,365	0.9
^{1} Source: . ^{2} Source:. ^{3} Source: . ^{4} Source: . ^{5} Source: . ^{6} Source: .

== Political situation ==
After the independence of Turkmenistan, many non-Turkmen were removed from government jobs. It also affected Azerbaijanis living in this country. During the "Turkmenization" policy in Turkmenistan, Azerbaijanis working in important jobs in the civil service lost their positions for various reasons. Some were fired from their jobs because they were accused of not knowing the Turkmen language (which is mostly a lie, because all Azerbaijanis in the country know the Turkmen language very fluently), and some because they received their diplomas abroad and were no longer considered valid. Although this led to long-term complaints, it ultimately did not work. Turkmens were immediately recruited to replace those who were fired.

At the same time, in the early 2000s, the deterioration of relations between the Republic of Azerbaijan and Turkmenistan opened the way for the Azerbaijanis in Turkmenistan to face political pressure. In November 2002, an allegation of "conspiracy preparation" was made against the life of the President of Turkmenistan. It was claimed that Azerbaijani citizens participated in the assassination plan. After that, the Turkmen secret services began to see every Azerbaijani as an agent of the Republic of Azerbaijan. During this period, a mass deportation of Azerbaijanis who allegedly did not have visas to stay in Turkmenistan was recorded in Turkmenbashi port. Moreover, even families with children, whose parents work in commercial companies of Azerbaijan in Turkmenistan, were sent. After the death of Heydar Aliyev, on December 21, 2003, Azerbaijanis gathered at the Shia mosque in Turkmenbashi to celebrate his funeral. At that time, the employees of the Ministry of National Security of Turkmenistan, who came to the mosque, demanded that the Azerbaijanis leave the place. According to the Azerbaijanis who took part in the incident, they could not understand why and how this incident happened, they did not imagine that the state of Turkmenistan would not even allow the ceremony related to Heydar Aliyev's death until the incident happened. Currently, the relative improvement of relations between the two countries has a positive effect on the lives of Azerbaijanis there.

== Notable people ==
- Hajibala Abutalybov, Mayor of Baku (2001-2018)
- Ataya Aliyeva, Azerbaijani actress
- Tahir Baghirov, National Hero of Azerbaijan
- Rolan Guliyev, kickboxer; World Champion version WPKA (2009); Champion of 2004 Asian Kickboxing; Turkmenistan champion 2004 kickboxing among professionals; two-time champion in kickboxing Azerbaijan (2005 and 2006) among young people
- Natavan Habibi, Azerbaijani pop singer
- Elnur Hüseynov, one of the two singers who represented Azerbaijan in the Eurovision Song Contest 2008
- Azhdar Ibrahimov, Azerbaijani Soviet film director, one of the people involved in the creation of Turkmen and Vietnamese filmography
- Fakhraddin Musayev, National Hero of Azerbaijan
- Ramiz Mustafayev, Azerbaijani composer and conductor
- Tahira Tahirova, Minister of Foreign Affairs of Azerbaijan SSR (1959–1983)
- Hasan Mammadov, violinist, member of "Firuza", "Gunesh" and "Ashgabad" music groups, Honored Artist of Turkmenistan
- Shamil Azizbayov, geologist specializing in petrology and metallogeny. He was one of the founders (1945) and a vice-president of the Azerbaijan National Academy of Sciences.

== See also ==
- Azerbaijan–Turkmenistan relations
- Turkic Council
- Azerbaijani diaspora
- Demographics of Turkmenistan
