= Azerbaijan–Turkmenistan relations =

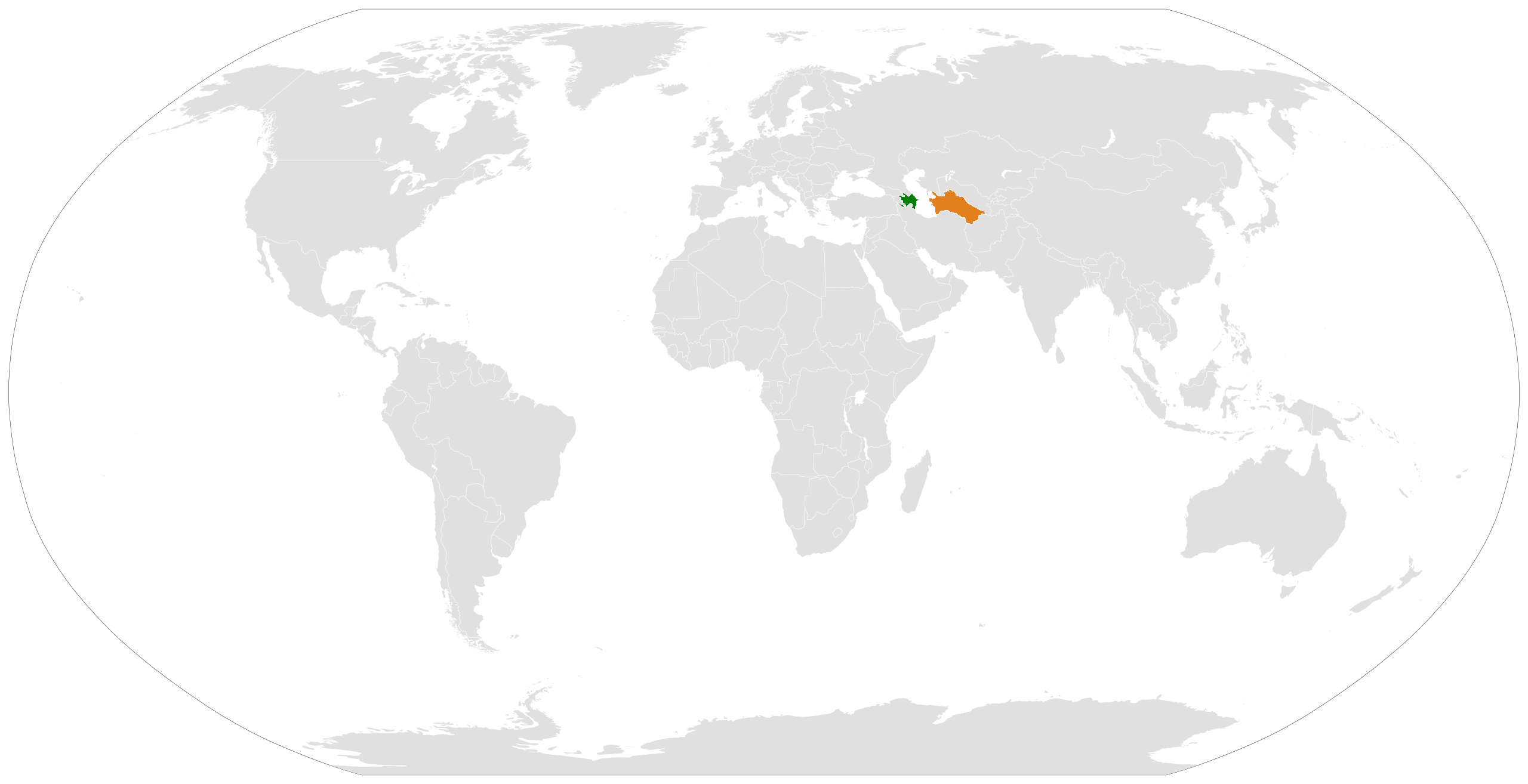

- Azerbaijan: Turkmenistan

Azerbaijan–Turkmenistan relations refers to the bilateral foreign relations between Azerbaijan and Turkmenistan. Azerbaijan has an embassy in Ashgabat. Turkmenistan has an embassy in Baku. Both countries were previously subordinated republics of the Soviet Union as Azerbaijan Soviet Socialist Republic and Turkmen Soviet Socialist Republic before the dissolution of the Soviet Union in 1991.

== Diplomatic relations ==
Diplomatic relations were established on June 9, 1992.

Azerbaijan opened its embassy in Turkmenistan on October 18, 2002. The embassy began operations on December 25, 2002.

Turkmenistan opened its embassy in Azerbaijan on May 4, 1999, and it began operations on June 8, 1999.

On June 4, 2001, Turkmenistan officially informed Azerbaijan about the temporary relocation of the residence of the Ambassador Extraordinary and Plenipotentiary of Turkmenistan from Azerbaijan to Ashgabat. The Embassy of Turkmenistan in Azerbaijan was closed. The official reason given for the closure was financial difficulties. In 2008, the Embassy of Turkmenistan in Azerbaijan was reopened.

In the Parliament of Azerbaijan, a working group on relations with Turkmenistan operates, headed by Fazail Agamali.

In the Assembly of Turkmenistan, there is also a working group on relations with Azerbaijan, headed by Gurbanmyrat Ashirov.

A total of 108 agreements have been signed between the two countries.

== Economic relations ==
A joint intergovernmental commission on cooperation operates between the two countries.

=== Oil and gas sector ===
Transit deliveries of Turkmen oil are carried out through the Baku–Tbilisi–Ceyhan pipeline.

Since December 2021, swap gas deliveries from Turkmenistan to Azerbaijan have been conducted through Iranian territory, amounting to 1.5–2 billion cubic meters per year. From March 2022 to March 2023, 4.5 million cubic meters of gas were supplied per day. From March to August 2023, the volume of supplies increased to 10 million cubic meters per day.

== Resident diplomatic missions ==
- Azerbaijan has an embassy in Ashgabat.
- Turkmenistan has an embassy in Baku.

== See also ==
- Azerbaijanis in Turkmenistan
- Diplomacy of the Caspian littoral states
- Foreign relations of Azerbaijan
- Foreign relations of Turkmenistan
