= Poland–Turkmenistan relations =

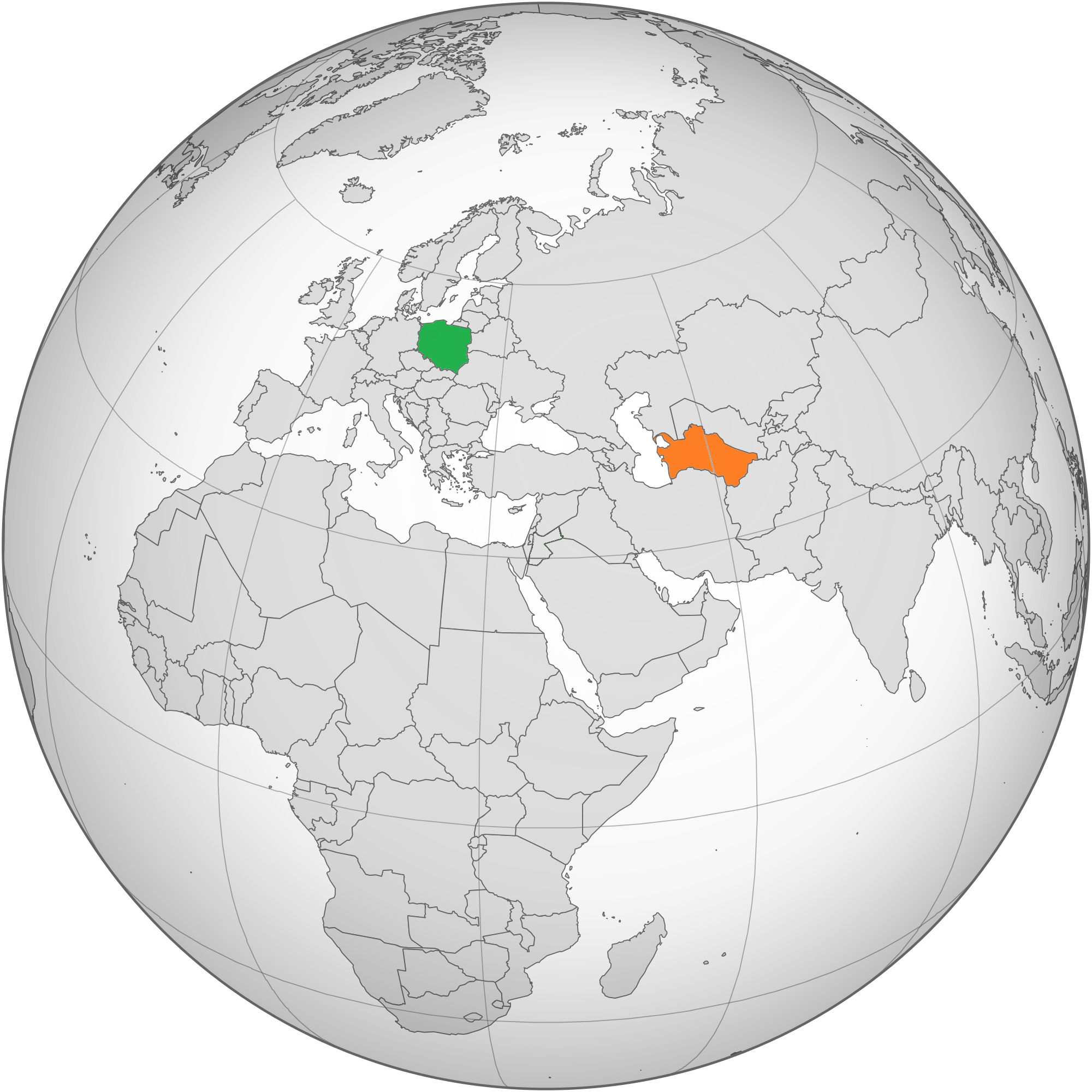
- Poland: Turkmenistan

Poland–Turkmenistan relations are the bilateral relations between Poland and Turkmenistan. Both nations are full members of the OSCE and United Nations.

== History ==
In the late modern period, both nations shared a similar fate, with parts of Poland annexed by Russia following the Partitions of Poland, and Turkmen lands falling to the Russian Empire. Since then, there were migrations, often forced, in both directions. According to the 1897 census, there were 3,774 Poles, mostly conscripted into the Russian Army, in the four southern uezds of the Transcaspian Oblast, roughly corresponding to present-day Turkmenistan, with the largest communities of 1,605 and 894 in Ashgabat and Mary, respectively, whereas there were very few Turkmens in the Russian Partition of Poland, with the largest population of 16 in the city of Wilno.

Following the joint German-Soviet invasion of Poland, which started World War II in 1939, the Soviets carried out deportations of Poles from occupied eastern Poland to the Turkmen Soviet Socialist Republic. After the Sikorski–Mayski agreement, a Polish diplomatic post was located in Ashgabat in 1942. In 1942, the Polish Anders' Army along with civilians was evacuated from the USSR via Turkmenistan to Iran, either by sea from the port of Krasnovodsk or by land from Ashgabat to Mashhad. As of 1943, there were still 572 Polish citizens in Turkmenistan, according to Soviet data. After the war, over 1,300 Poles were repatriated from the Turkmen SSR to Poland in 1946–1948.

Poland recognized Turkmenistan shortly after the Turkmen declaration of independence, and bilateral relations were established in 1992. An economic cooperation agreement was signed in 2015.

== Diplomatic missions ==
- Poland is accredited to Turkmenistan from its embassy in Baku, Azerbaijan.
- Turkmenistan is accredited to Poland from its embassy in Berlin, Germany.

== See also ==
- Foreign relations of Poland
- Foreign relations of Turkmenistan
- Poles in Turkmenistan
