= Turkmenistan–Uzbekistan relations =

Uzbekistan–Turkmenistan relations
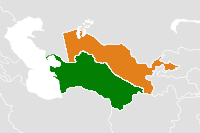

- Turkmenistan: Uzbekistan

Turkmenistan–Uzbekistan relations refers to the relations between the neighboring Turkmenistan and Uzbekistan. Uzbekistan has an embassy in Ashgabat. Turkmenistan has an embassy in Tashkent. Both countries were previously subordinated republics of the Soviet Union as Turkmen Soviet Socialist Republic and Uzbek Soviet Socialist Republic before its collapse in 1991.

== History ==
The Embassy of Turkmenistan in Tashkent was opened in 1996. The Embassy of Uzbekistan in Ashgabat was opened in 1995.

=== Rifts ===
Relations between Turkmenistan and Uzbekistan became tense in the 1990s as border controls and ethnic conflict became major sources of tension. Both the Turkmen minority of Uzbekistan and the Uzbek minority of Turkmenistan were intentionally subjected to discrimination, as poor quality education for both groups increased a lack of fluency in their respective country's dominant language as well as in Russian (languages necessary for higher education). Consequently, both minority communities experienced increased exclusion from job markets resulting in gradual social and economic decline throughout the 1990s.

==== Relations in late 2002 ====
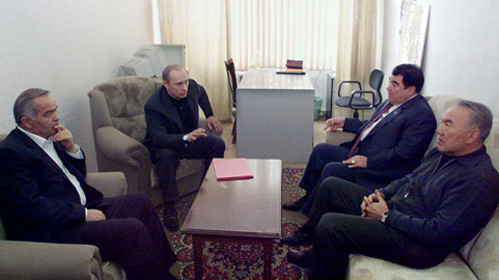
Karimov, Putin, Niyazov and Nazarbayev in 2002

Ties worsened particularly under the government of Turkmen President Saparmurat Niyazov, who in November 2002 accused Uzbekistan of being responsible for sponsoring an attempt on his life. He accused Uzbekistan's ambassador in Ashgabat, Abdurashid Kadyrov, of assisting an alleged coup leader, former Foreign minister Boris Şyhmyradow. As a result, the Uzbek ambassador was forced to leave and in the following days, Turkmen authorities forcibly relocated ethnic Uzbeks living near the Turkmen border. The peak in this tension rose a month later, when the special forces of the Ministry for National Security of Turkmenistan raided the Embassy of Uzbekistan in Ashgabat on 16 December to look for Şyhmyradow. The raid violated the Vienna Convention on the Immunity of Diplomatic Missions and Diplomats. The Turkmen authorities justified the raid by saying that they were trying to “search for terrorists hiding in the embassy”. During the invasion of the embassy, the Ambassador Kadyrov and his wife were at the Kazakh Embassy, at a gala reception in honor of the Independence Day of Kazakhstan. As a result, Uzbek President Islam Karimov on principle refused to personally participate in the funeral of Niyazov several years later.

==== Border ====
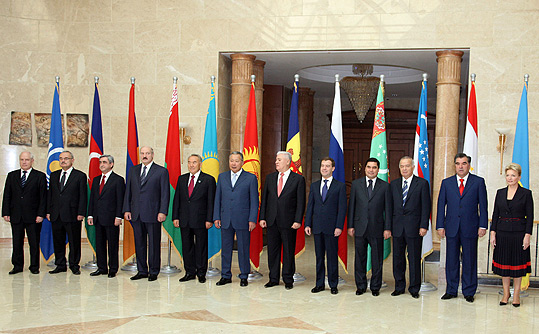
CIS meeting in 2008

Turkmenistan and Uzbekistan had serious "issues" regarding their mutual border until May 2004 when the Turkmen Foreign Ministry released a statement on May 31, 2004, saying disputes had been resolved. Relations on this issue have further improved in recent years, while work to achieve the full demarcation of the border is ongoing as of 2018.

=== Positive developments ===
The state visit of President Karimov to Turkmenistan in October 2007 and the state visit of the new Turkmen President Gurbanguly Berdimuhamedov to Uzbekistan in March 2008 became important stages in the positive development of Turkmen-Uzbek relations. Subsequent meetings (particularly their meeting in 2012) between Berdimuhamedov and Karimov contributed to the development of relations. Until Shavkat Mirziyoev became Uzbekistan's president in September 2016, Turkmenistan was considered to be the only Central Asian neighbor with which it had good bilateral relations.

== Ambassadors ==
Ambassadors from Turkmenistan to Uzbekistan:

- Soltan Pirmukhammedov (1996–2012)
- Shiri Shiriev (2012–2018)
- Yazkuli Mamedov (2018–present)

Ambassadors from Uzbekistan to Turkmenistan:

- Abdulakhat Jalilov (1995–1999)
- Abdurashid Kadyrov (1999–2002)
- Alisher Kadyrov (2005–2009)
- Sherzod Fayziev (2009–2012)
- Javkhar Izamov (2012–2016)
- Akmalzhon Kuchkarov (2016–present)

== Resident diplomatic missions ==
- Turkmenistan has an embassy in Tashkent.
- Uzbekistan has an embassy in Ashgabat.

== See also ==
- Foreign relations of Turkmenistan
- Foreign relations of Uzbekistan
