= South Korea–Turkmenistan relations =

- South Korea: Turkmenistan

Diplomatic mission
- Embassy of South Korea, Ashgabat: Embassy of Turkmenistan, Seoul

South Korea–Turkmenistan relations refer to the bilateral relations between South Korea and Turkmenistan. The two countries established diplomatic relations on February 7, 1992, and formed a mutually beneficial partnership in 2008. Since then, they have maintained economic cooperation, particularly in the energy and industrial equipment sectors, while expanding cooperation into trade, infrastructure, science and technology, healthcare, education, and culture.

== History ==
South Korea and Turkmenistan established diplomatic relations on February 7, 1992, following the dissolution of the Soviet Union.

In June 2007, the Embassy of the Republic of Korea in Turkmenistan was opened in Ashgabat. The following year, in May 2008, South Korean Prime Minister Han Seung-soo visited Turkmenistan, and the two countries agreed to expand cooperation in the economic and cultural fields.

In November 2013, the Embassy of Turkmenistan in South Korea was opened in Seoul. In March 2018, Turkmenistan's Foreign Minister Rashid Meredov visited South Korea and held talks with South Korean Foreign Minister Kang Kyung-wha. The two sides discussed ways to cooperate in the energy and infrastructure sectors.

In April 2019, South Korean President Moon Jae-in paid a state visit to Turkmenistan. The two countries agreed to strengthen economic cooperation in various fields, including energy and industrial equipment, and to expand bilateral exchanges.

In 2022, the two countries marked the 30th anniversary of the establishment of diplomatic relations. Building on their longstanding friendly ties, they agreed to continue expanding cooperation in the political, economic, and cultural fields.

In June 2024, South Korean President Yoon Suk Yeol visited Turkmenistan and held a summit with President Serdar Berdimuhamedow. The two countries agreed to strengthen cooperation in the energy and industrial sectors and expand their cooperation into other areas, including transportation and infrastructure.

== Economic Relations ==
Economic cooperation between the Republic of Korea and Turkmenistan has developed primarily around natural gas, the petrochemical industry, and industrial plant construction. Turkmenistan possesses abundant natural gas resources, and South Korean companies have participated in energy development and chemical plant construction projects. Building on this cooperation, the two countries are seeking to expand collaboration in trade, investment, transportation, and infrastructure.

The two countries discuss measures to expand trade and investment through the Intergovernmental Joint Commission on Trade, Economic, Scientific and Technological Cooperation. At the 9th session of the Joint Commission, held in June 2024, the two sides discussed potential cooperation in trade and investment, the chemical industry, the oil and gas industries, healthcare, and transportation. Both sides agreed on the need to develop bilateral cooperation by making use of their economic potential.

In June 2024, on the occasion of South Korean President Yoon Suk Yeol's state visit to Turkmenistan, the two countries signed a Trade and Investment Promotion Framework (TIPF). This agreement established a foundation for promoting business-to-business exchanges and investment cooperation, as well as systematically expanding economic cooperation between the two countries.

Concrete projects have also been pursued in the energy and industrial plant sectors. During the 2024 summit, Hyundai Engineering signed a basic agreement with Turkmenistan's state-owned gas company Turkmengas for the construction of a desulfurization facility at the Galkynysh Gas Field. In addition, the two sides signed a cooperation agreement aimed at resuming operations at Turkmenistan's Kiyanly Polymer Plant.

Beyond the oil and gas industries, the two countries are exploring potential cooperation in fertilizer production facilities, shipbuilding, transportation, urban development, and infrastructure. Turkmenistan seeks to utilize South Korea's industrial technologies and corporate expertise, while South Korea is pursuing expanded economic exchanges with Turkmenistan as part of its efforts to strengthen economic cooperation with Central Asian countries.

== Resident diplomatic missions ==
- South Korea has an embassy in Ashgabat.
- Turkmenistan has an embassy in Seoul.

== See also ==
- Foreign relations of South Korea
- Foreign relations of Turkmenistan
