= Malaysia–Turkmenistan relations =

- Malaysia: Turkmenistan

Malaysia–Turkmenistan relations refers to foreign relations between Malaysia and Turkmenistan. Malaysia has an embassy in Ashgabat, and Turkmenistan has an embassy in Kuala Lumpur.

== Economic relations ==
Both Malaysia and Turkmenistan are looking to increase bilateral ties especially on economic relations. A number of documents have been signed by both sides to forge closer ties between them. In addition, a number of Malaysian companies have shown interest in the development of tourism and infrastructure between the two countries. In 2012, the President of Turkmenistan Gurbanguly Berdimuhamedov invited more Malaysian firms to explore business opportunities in Turkmenistan. Malaysian state-owned oil and gas company Petronas has been operating within the country since 1996, with investments in Turkmenistan totaling US$10 billion as of 2019. Malaysia also seeks to expand its halal food trade, as well as total trade between the two countries. In 2013 this trade amounted to $33.13 million compared to $11.68 million in 2012 and $24.27 million in 2011.

== Resident diplomatic missions ==
- Malaysia has an embassy in Ashgabat.
- Turkmenistan has an embassy in Kuala Lumpur.

== See also ==
- Foreign relations of Malaysia
- Foreign relations of Turkmenistan
