= Poles in Turkmenistan =

Polish diaspora in Turkmenistan

Total population
- 501 (1995, census)

Poles in Turkmenistan form a small population of 501, according to the 1995 census, and Polish presence in Turkmenistan dates back to the 19th century.

== History ==
Historical population
Year	Pop.	±%
1939	933	—
1959	560	−40.0%
1970	675	+20.5%
1979	643	−4.7%
1989	620	−3.6%
1995	501	−19.2%

In the late 18th century, Poland lost its independence in the course of the Partitions of Poland, and its territory was annexed by Prussia (later Germany), Russia and Austria, while Turkmen lands were annexed by Russia in the 19th century. According to the 1897 census, there were 3,774 Poles, mostly conscripted into the Russian Army, in the four southern uezds of the Transcaspian Oblast, roughly corresponding to present-day Turkmenistan, with the largest communities of 1,605 and 894 in Ashgabat and Mary, respectively.

Following the joint German-Soviet invasion of Poland, which started World War II in 1939, the Soviets carried out deportations of Poles from occupied eastern Poland to the Turkmen Soviet Socialist Republic. In 1942, the Polish Anders' Army along with civilians was evacuated from the USSR via Turkmenistan to Iran, either by sea from the port of Krasnovodsk or by land from Ashgabat to Mashhad. As of 1943, there were still 572 Polish citizens in Turkmenistan, according to Soviet data. After the war, over 1,300 Poles were repatriated from the Turkmen SSR to Poland in 1946–1948.

== See also ==
- Poland–Turkmenistan relations
- Polish diaspora
- Demographics of Turkmenistan
