= Russia–Turkmenistan relations =

- Russia: Turkmenistan

Diplomatic mission
- Russian embassy, Ashgabat: Turkmen embassy, Moscow

Russia–Turkmenistan relations (Russian: Российско-туркменские отношения) are the bilateral relations between Russia and Turkmenistan. Russia has an embassy in Ashgabat and a consulate-general in Türkmenbaşy. Turkmenistan has an embassy in Moscow. In 1885 the modern-day Turkmenistani region became absorbed into the Russian Empire. After 1924 it became a Soviet Socialist Republic within the Soviet Union until declaring independence in 1991. The two nations have thus been mutually friendly for the past centuries.

== History ==
=== Background ===
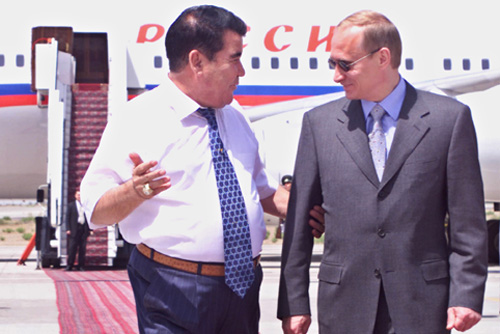
President Vladimir Putin and Turkmen President Saparmurat Niyazov at the airport, 2000

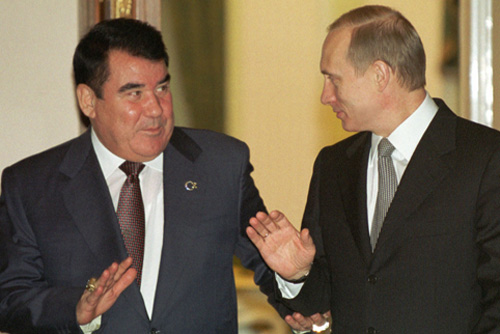
President Putin with President Saparmurat Niyazov of Turkmenistan in Moscow, 2002

Diplomatic relations were established on 8 April 1992 and the Treaty of Friendship and Cooperation was signed in Moscow on 31 July of that year. In the early day of his tenure, President Vladimir Putin paid a working visit to Turkmenistan and Saparmurat Niyazov reciprocated the visit in early 2002. On 23 April 2002, Presidents Niyazov and Putin signed a new Treaty of Friendship and Cooperation in Ashgabat. Turkmenistan does not allow dual citizenship, while those holding dual Russian-Turkmen citizenship were given three months to renounce their Russian citizenship in 2003 or face the confiscation of their property and forced departure from the country.

=== 2008 meeting ===
Dmitry Medvedev and Gurbanguly Berdymukhammedov discussed the prospects of further expanding their trade and economic ties. Particular attention was given to cooperation in energy and transport. The parties reviewed the implementation of multilateral agreements on the construction of Caspian gas pipeline and the development of existing gas transportation facilities in Central Asia. They also discussed the organisation of a direct rail-ferry service starting from the port of Astrakhan.

The parties exchanged views on important international and regional issues, and cooperation between Russia and Turkmenistan within the framework of international organisations.

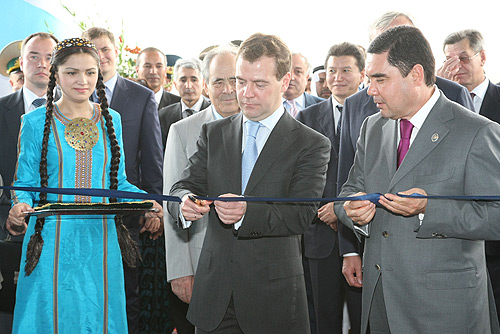
Dmitry Medvedev in Turkmenistan, in 2008

Following high-level talks between Russia and Turkmenistan the parties adopted a Joint Declaration. The document states that the two presidents confirm the strategic nature of relations between Russia and Turkmenistan and stress that these relations are gradually developing in a wide range of areas.

A number of documents were signed in the presence of the heads of state. In particular, the Agreement on Cooperation between the Governments of Russia and Turkmenistan on the Protection of Classified Information. The countries' ministries of culture signed a Memorandum of Cooperation and an Agreement on Cooperation in Education. The countries' ministries of foreign affairs signed a cooperation programme for 2008–2009.

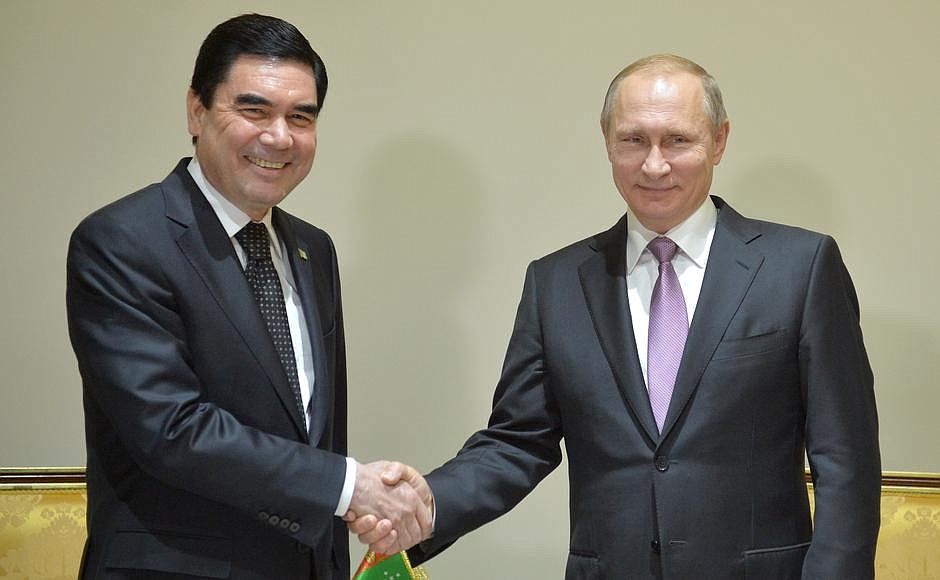
Berdimuhamedow and Putin in November 2015

Speaking at the opening ceremony, President Dmitry Medvedev expressed his hope that cooperation between Turkmenistan and Russia will develop, and stressed that Russia is always open to meaningful and committed partnership.

The presidents toured the new centre, accompanied by the chief executive of KamAZ, Sergei Kogogin. The head of the company described the technical features of the vehicles, noting in particular that they are capable of working in temperatures ranging from minus 45 to plus 50 degrees. One of its affiliated companies has been working in Turkmenistan since May 2006. To ensure warranty and post-warranty service a temporary centre in Ashgabat has been opened. The servicing of vehicles is done by experts from the KamAZ factory. The new service centre was founded in May 2007. It houses not only a working area but also classrooms and offices.

=== 2022 meeting ===
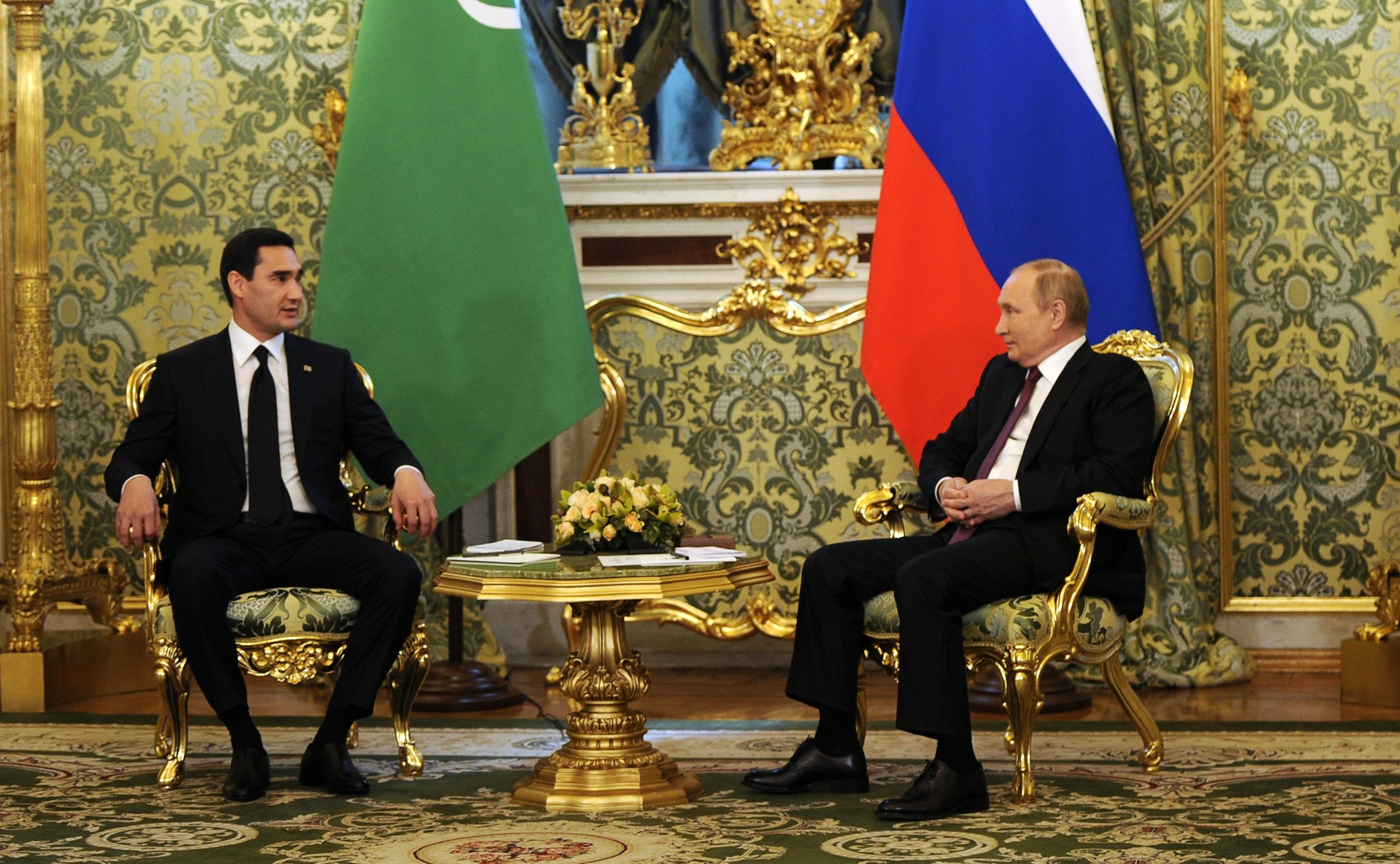
Serdar Berdimuhamedow and Vladimir Putin in 2022

On June 10, President Serdar Berdimuhamedow and Vladimir Putin met in Moscow. It was the first official foreign visit by the newly elected president.

== Economic ties ==
In the structure of Russian exports to Turkmenistan, the main volume in 2012 falls on the share of metals and metal products (45.1% of total exports), as well as machinery, equipment and vehicles (25.1%), food products and agricultural raw materials (11.2 %).

Imports from Turkmenistan are dominated by chemical products (55.4% of total imports from Turkmenistan; an increase of 106.3% compared to 2011), textiles, textile products (29.1%; a decrease of 17.2%), machinery, equipment and vehicles (5.6%; an increase of 332.9% compared to 2011), fuel and energy products (9.3%, a decrease of 30.2%).

=== Ties regarding gas ===
Recently, Russian–Turkmenistan relations have revolved around Russia's efforts to secure natural gas export deals from Turkmenistan. Russia is competing with China, the European Union, and the United States for access to Turkmenistan's rich supply of hydrocarbons. The two countries often conflict over price negotiations for gas exports to Russia.

Turkmen president Gurbanguly Berdimuhamedow has agreed to help supply and expand the Russian-backed Pricaspiysky pipeline, however no action has yet occurred towards this goal.

== Military cooperation ==
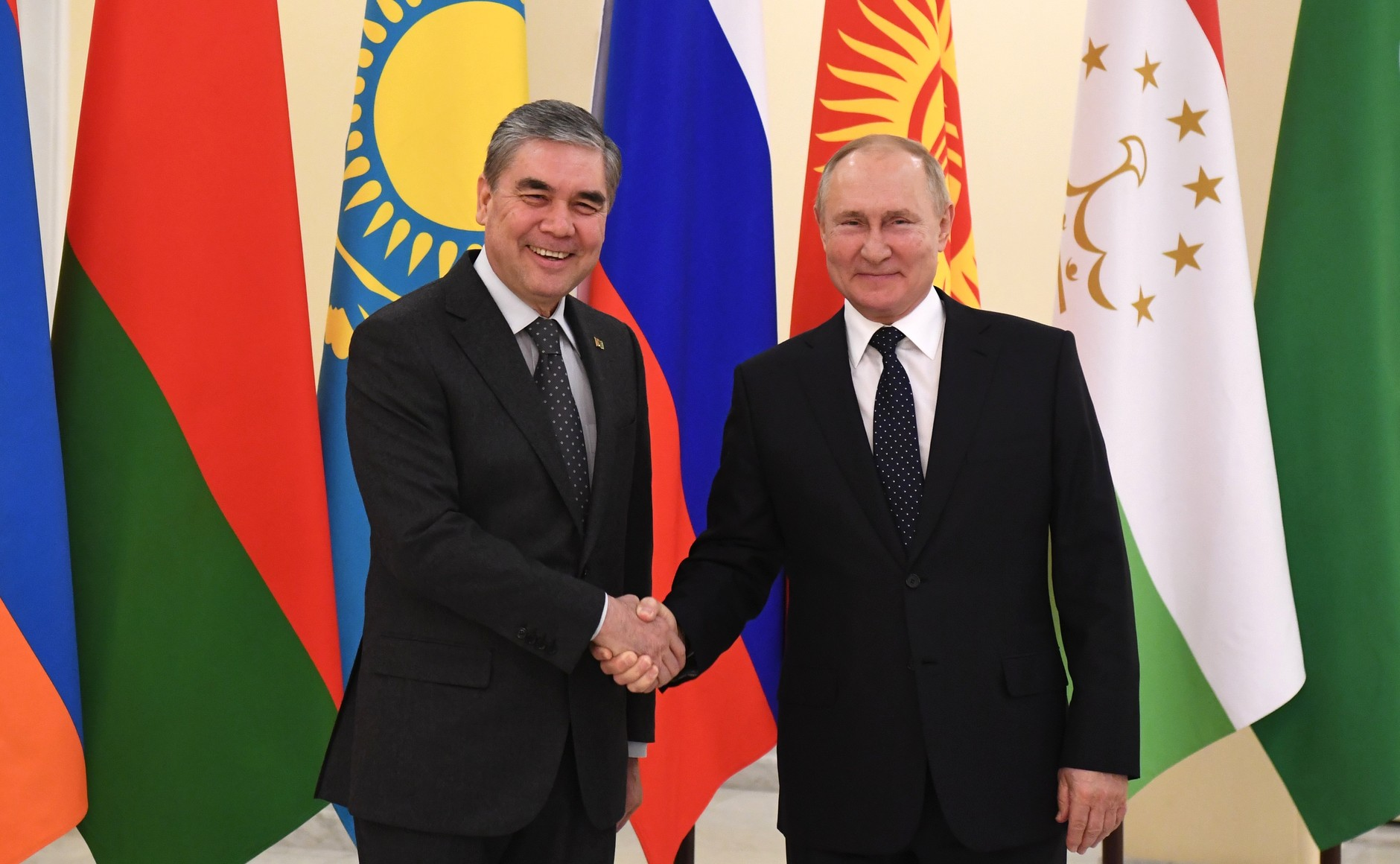
Putin with Berdimuhamedow during Informal meeting of the CIS heads of state in St. Petersburg, 2021

In the early years of independence, the Armed Forces of Turkmenistan were under the joint Russian-Turkmen command, with the country's borders being guarded by Russian border guards. The Russian military commander in the nation was Lieutenant General Nikolai Kormiltsev, commander of the Separate Combined-Arms Army of Turkmenistan. In total, 7,000 Russian officers and border forces served in Turkmenistan. With Turkmenistan becoming a permanent neutral country and former CIS troops withdrew, the two countries still maintain some defense cooperation, and Turkmenistan imported Russian-made T90 tanks.

== See also ==
- Foreign relations of Russia
- Foreign relations of Turkmenistan
- History of Turkmenistan
- List of ambassadors of Russia to Turkmenistan
