= List of diplomatic missions in Turkmenistan =

This is a list of diplomatic missions in Turkmenistan. At present, the capital city, Ashgabat, hosts 33 embassies and 6 other missions with diplomatic status, including one bilateral mission, two international financial institutions, and three multilateral missions.

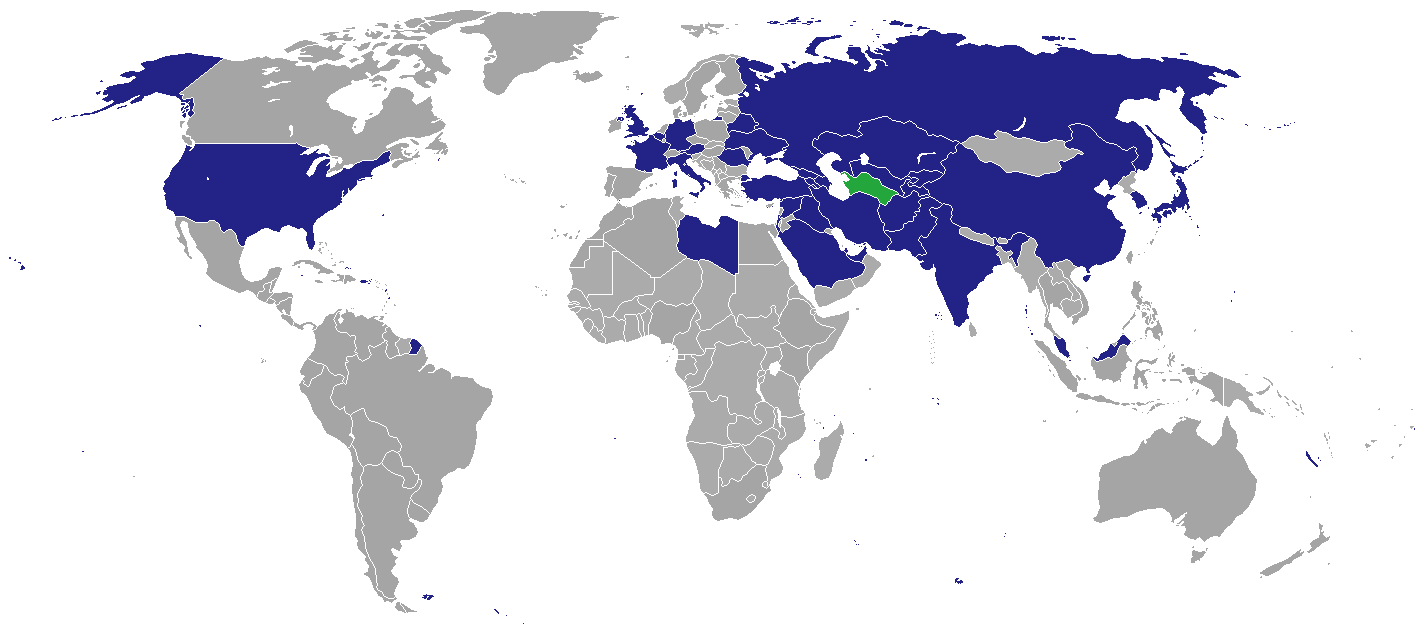
Diplomatic missions in Turkmenistan

== Diplomatic missions in Ashgabat ==
=== Embassies ===
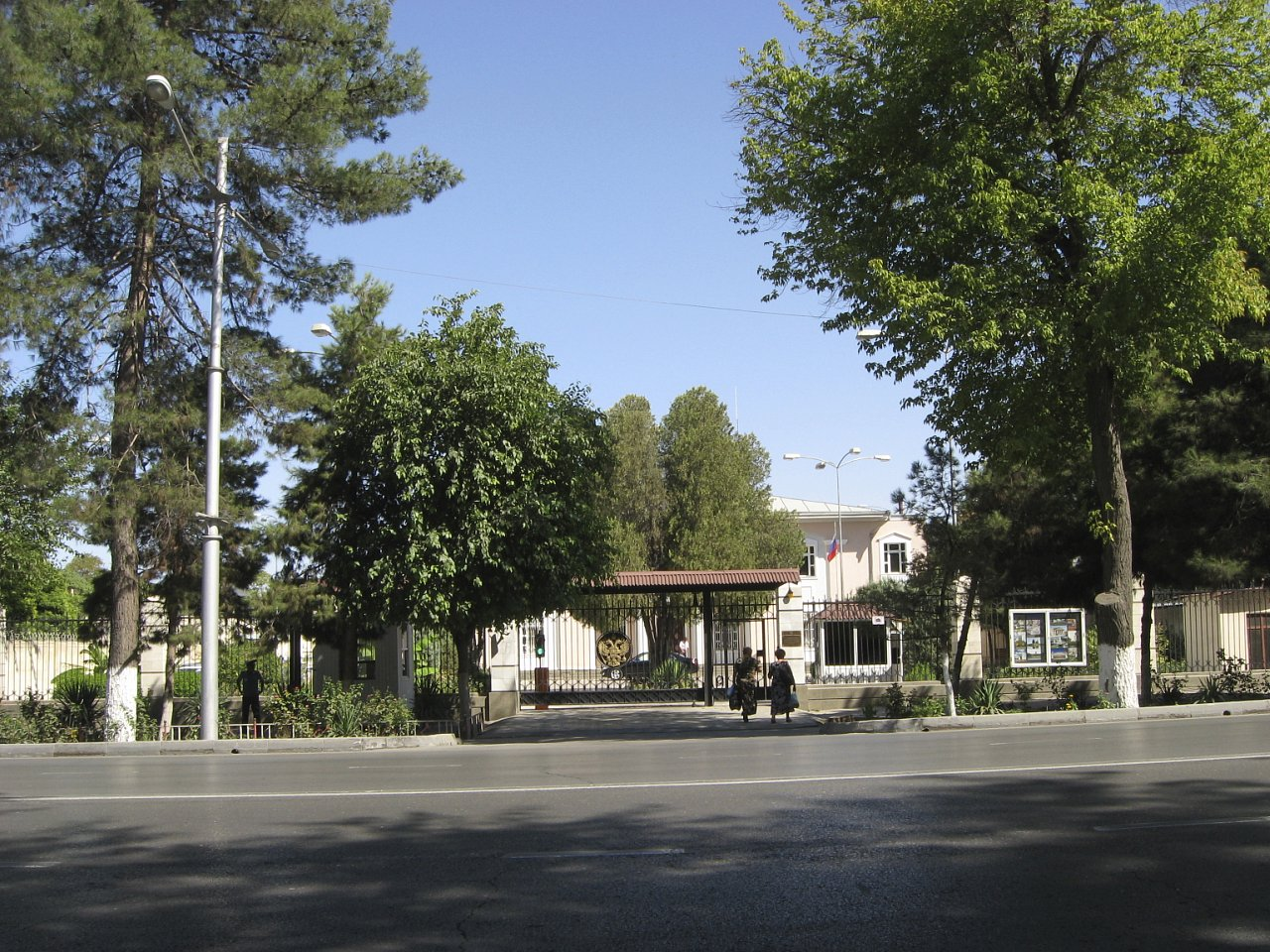
Consular office of the Russian Embassy in Ashgabat

1. Afghanistan
2. Armenia
3. Azerbaijan
4. Belarus
5. China
6. France
7. Georgia
8. Germany
9. Holy See
10. India
11. Iran
12. Iraq
13. Israel
14. Italy
15. Japan
16. Kazakhstan
17. Kyrgyzstan
18. Libya
19. Malaysia
20. Pakistan
21. Palestine
22. Qatar
23. Romania
24. Russia
25. Saudi Arabia
26. South Korea
27. Tajikistan
28. Turkey
29. Ukraine
30. United Arab Emirates
31. United Kingdom
32. United States
33. Uzbekistan

=== Other missions/representative offices/delegations ===
- Tatarstan, Russia (Representative Office)
- ADB (Mission)
- EBRD (Representative Office)
- European Union (Delegation)
- OSCE (Mission)
- United Nations (Resident Coordinator's office)
  - UNDP Resident Mission
  - UNICEF Representative Office
  - United Nations Regional Centre for Preventive Diplomacy for Central Asia
  - World Health Organization Country Office in Turkmenistan

== Consular missions ==
=== Mary ===
- Afghanistan
- Iran (Consulate-General)

=== Türkmenbaşy ===
- Kazakhstan (Consulate)
- Russia (Consular point)

== Embassies to open ==
- Hungary

== Non-resident embassies ==
Resident in Ankara, Turkey:

- Algeria
- Belgium
- Canada
- Croatia
- Jordan
- Mexico
- Nicaragua
- Oman
- Portugal
- Thailand

Resident in Astana, Kazakhstan:

- Austria
- Brazil
- Bulgaria
- Estonia
- Morocco
- Netherlands
- South Africa

Resident in Baku, Azerbaijan:

- Cuba
- Lithuania
- Poland
- Switzerland

Resident in Moscow, Russia:

- Argentina
- Australia
- Chad
- Cyprus
- Denmark
- Egypt
- Equatorial Guinea
- Greece
- Iceland
- Ireland
- Nepal
- New Zealand
- North Korea
- Panama
- Serbia
- Slovenia
- Spain
- Vietnam

Resident in Tehran, Iran:

- Ghana
- Bosnia and Herzegovina
- Hungary
- Indonesia
- Kenya
- Niger
- Philippines
- Sierra Leone
- Sri Lanka
- Venezuela

Resident elsewhere:

- Czech Republic (Tashkent)
- Ethiopia (Islamabad)
- Finland (Helsinki)
- Guatemala (New York City)
- Latvia (Tashkent)
- Maldives (New Delhi)
- Malta (Valletta)
- Moldova (Kyiv)
- Seychelles (Abu Dhabi)
- Slovakia (Tashkent)
- Sweden (Stockholm)

== See also ==
- Foreign relations of Turkmenistan
