= Austria–Turkmenistan relations =

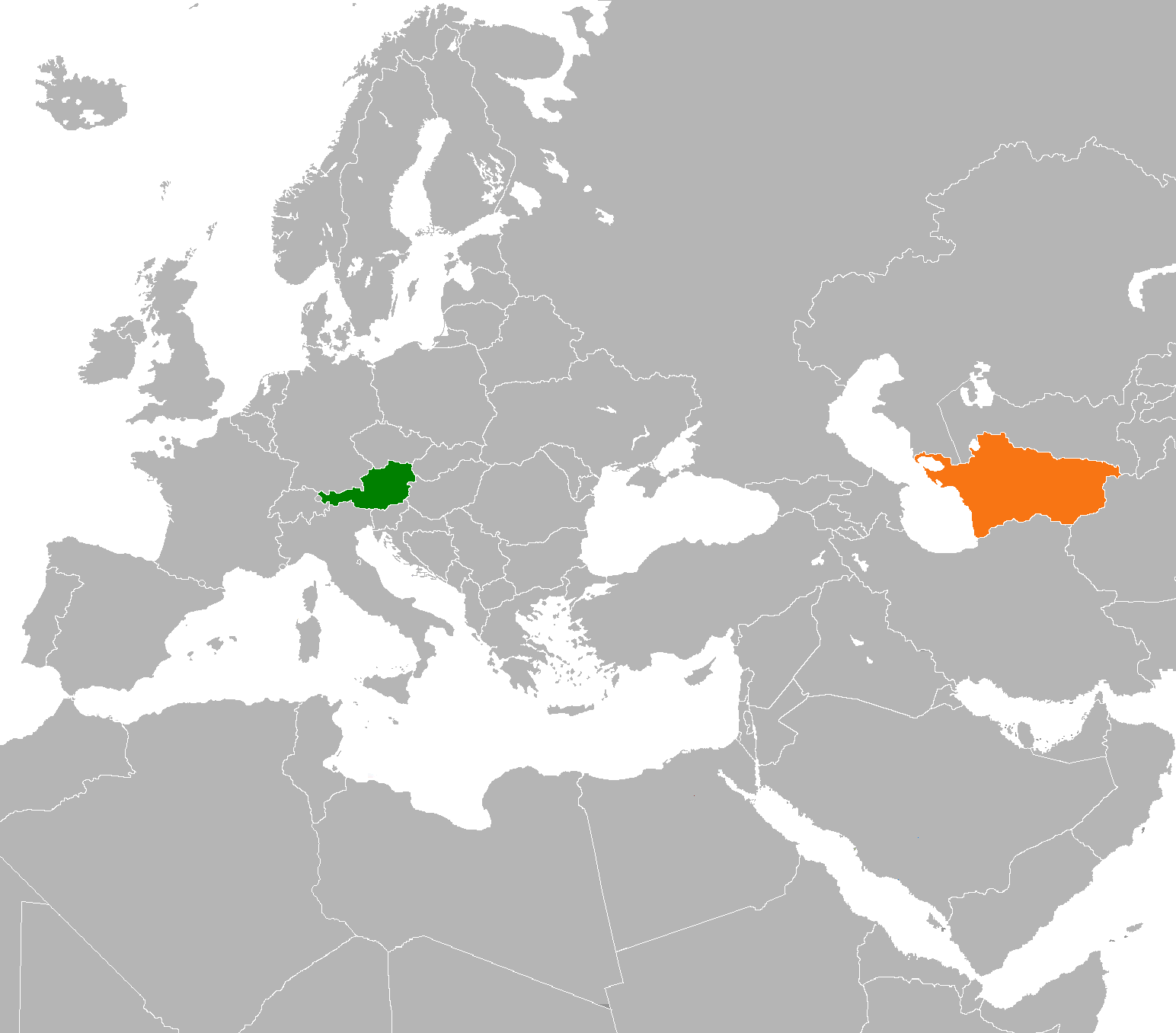
- Austria: Turkmenistan

Bilateral relations exist between Austria and Turkmenistan. Austria is accredited to Turkmenistan from its embassy in Astana, Kazakhstan. and a Turkmenistan maintains an embassy in Vienna.

== History ==
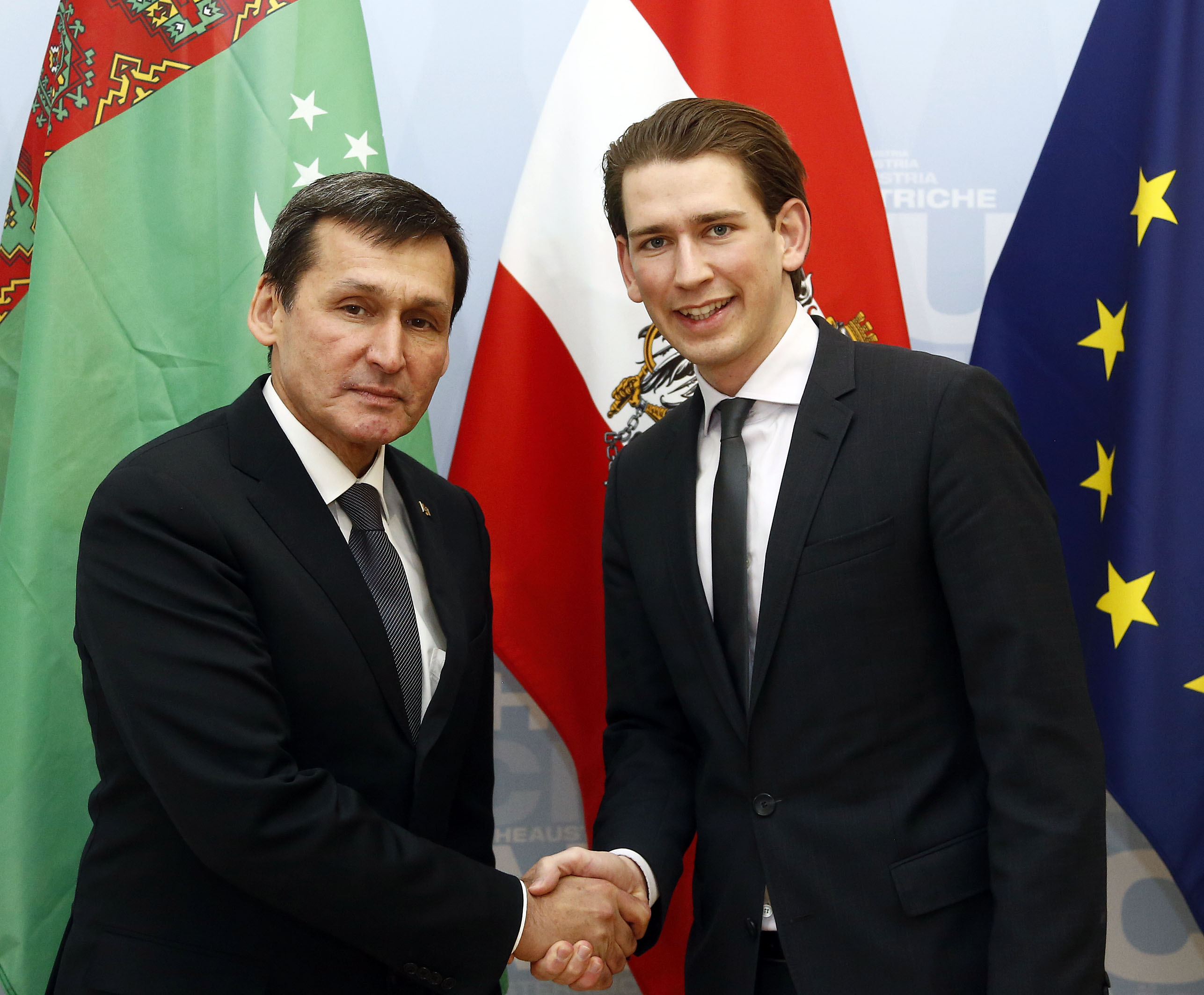
Meeting of Ministers of Foreign Affairs of Turkmenistan and Austria

Diplomatic relations between the two countries were established on 16 October 1992, during the signing of a joint communique.

The UN resolution on Turkmenistan's neutrality was developed with the assistance of Austria.

On 16 October 2011, the Austrian Federal President Heinz Fischer visited Turkmenistan.

== Resident diplomatic missions ==
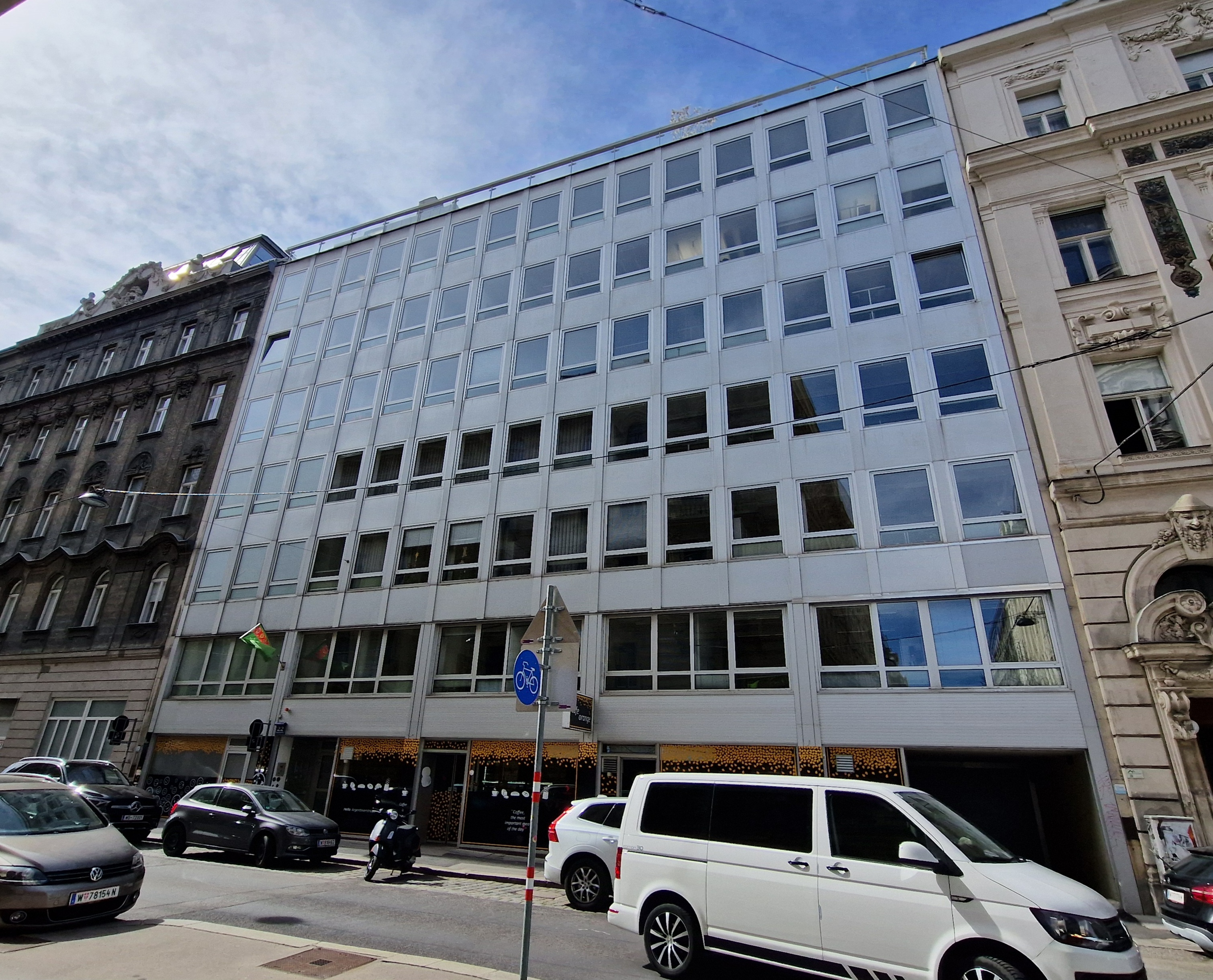
Embassy of Turkmenistan in Vienna

- Austria is accredited to Turkmenistan from its embassy in Astana, Kazakhstan.
- Turkmenistan has an embassy in Vienna.

== See also ==
- Foreign relations of Austria
- Foreign relations of Turkmenistan
