= India–Turkmenistan relations =

- Turkmenistan: India

India–Turkmenistan relations are the bilateral relations between India and Turkmenistan. India has an embassy in Ashgabat which opened in 1994. Turkmenistan has an embassy in New Delhi.

== TAPI Pipeline ==
India has a particular interest in Turkmenistan's hydrocarbon reserves.

Turkmenistan, Afghanistan, Pakistan and India, collectively known as the TAPI countries, are working on a gas pipeline which was initially scheduled for completion in early 2017. However, as of April 2024, the pipeline is yet to be completed. This is particularly important for India's burgeoning energy needs as on completion, the pipeline is expected to provide nearly 60% of India's energy needs.

== Trade ==
Total trade between Turkmenistan and India is meagre, amounting only to around US$42 million according to the Ministry of External Affairs of the Indian government.

== Gallery ==
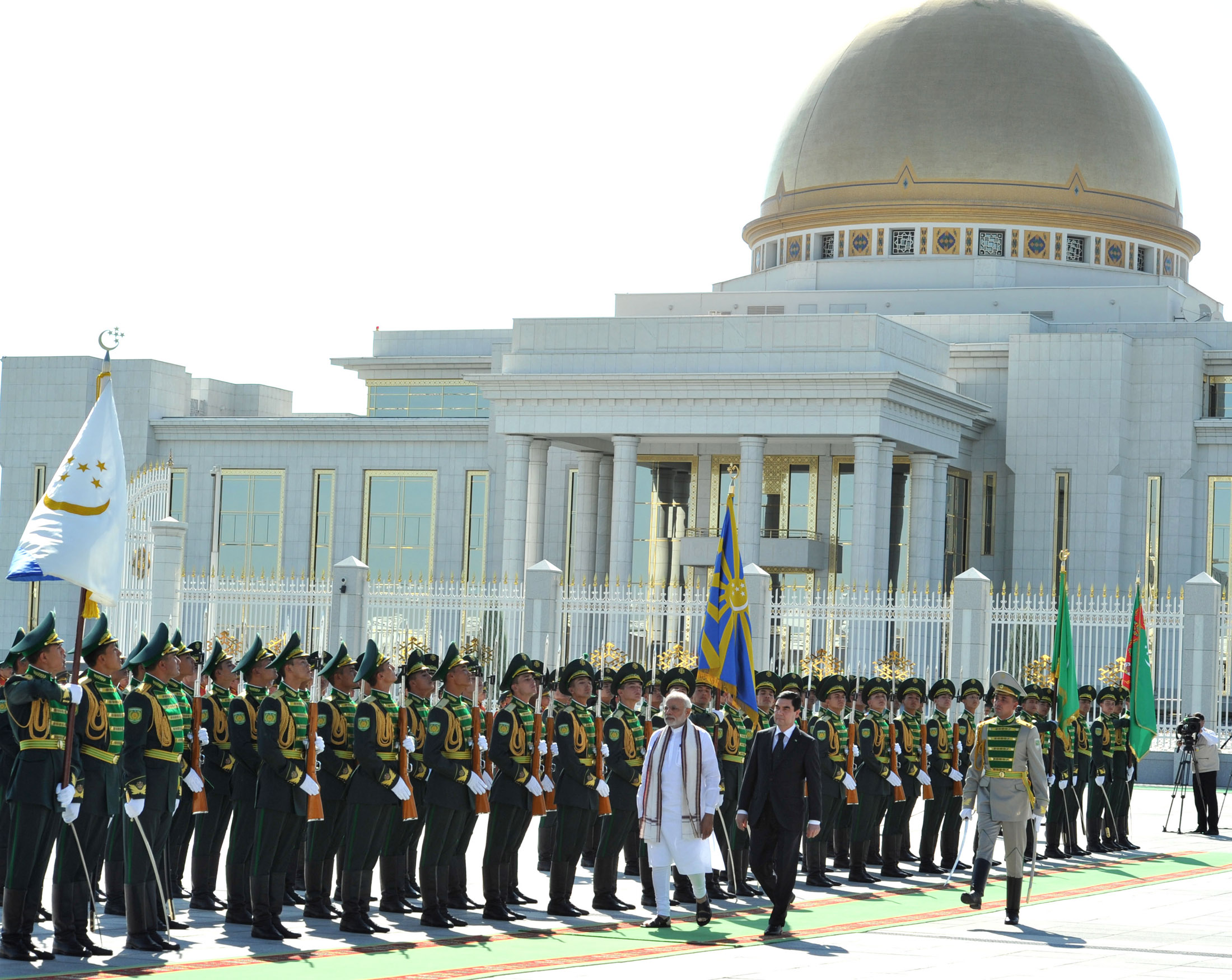
Prime Minister Narendra Modi in Turkmenistan.

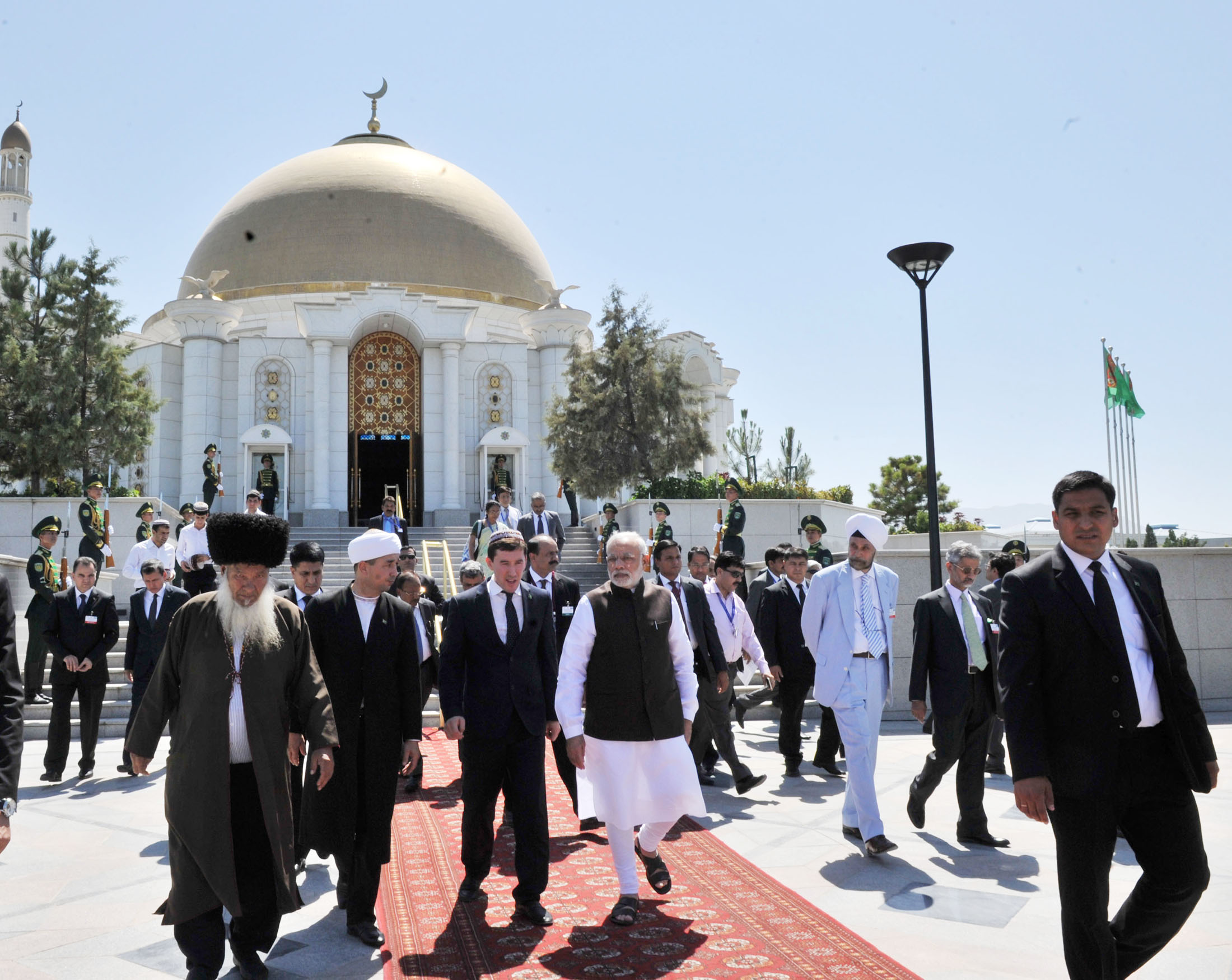
Narendra Modi at the Mausoleum of the First President of Turkmenistan, in Ashgabat, Turkmenistan, on July 11, 2015.

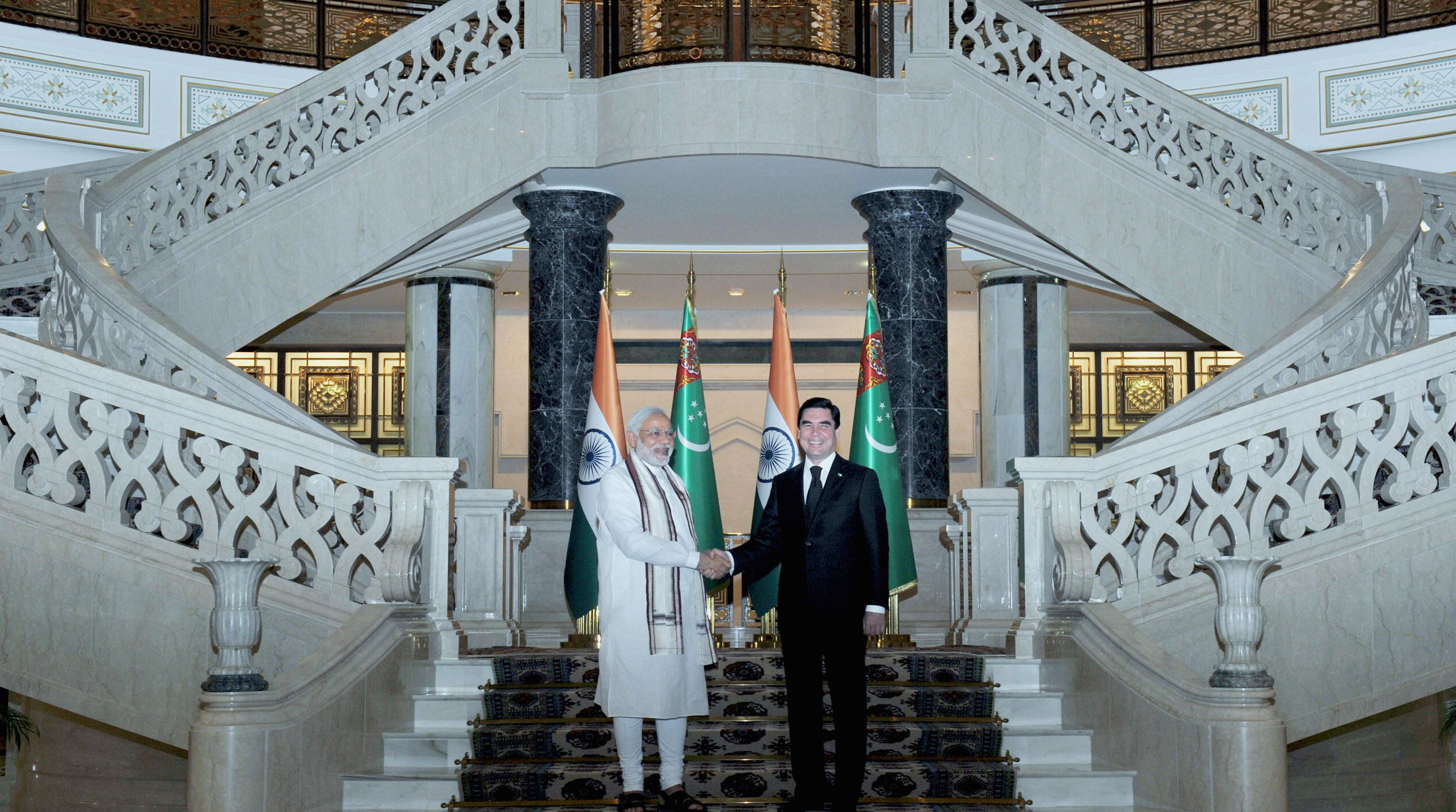
Narendra Modi in tete-a-tete with the President of Turkmenistan Gurbanguly Berdimuhamedov at Oguzkhan Palace in Ashgabat, Turkmenistan, on July 11, 2015.

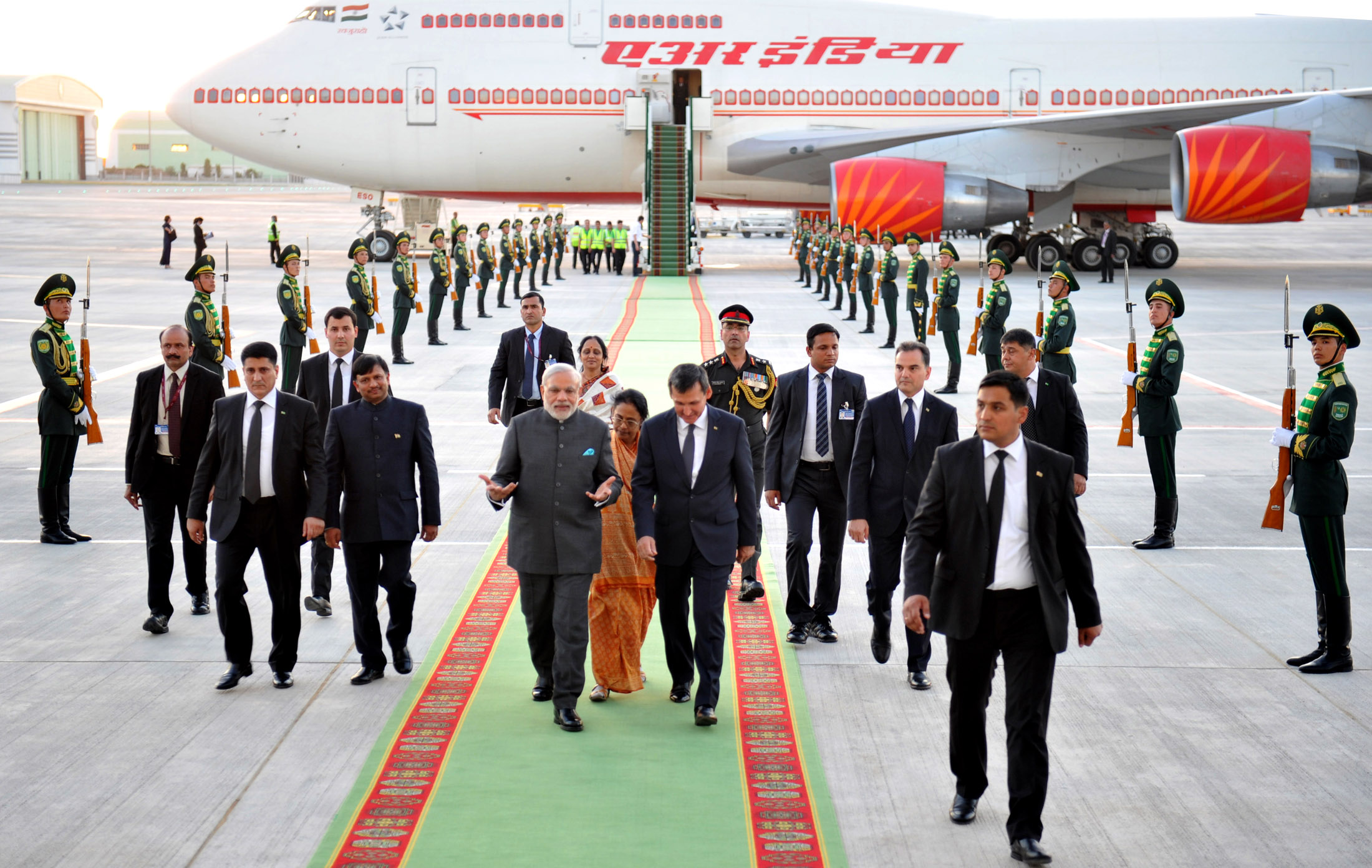
Narendra Modi being welcomed by the Deputy Prime Minister and Minister of Foreign Affairs of Turkmenistan Rasit Meredow on his arrival at Ashgabat International Airport, Turkmenistan, on July 10, 2015.

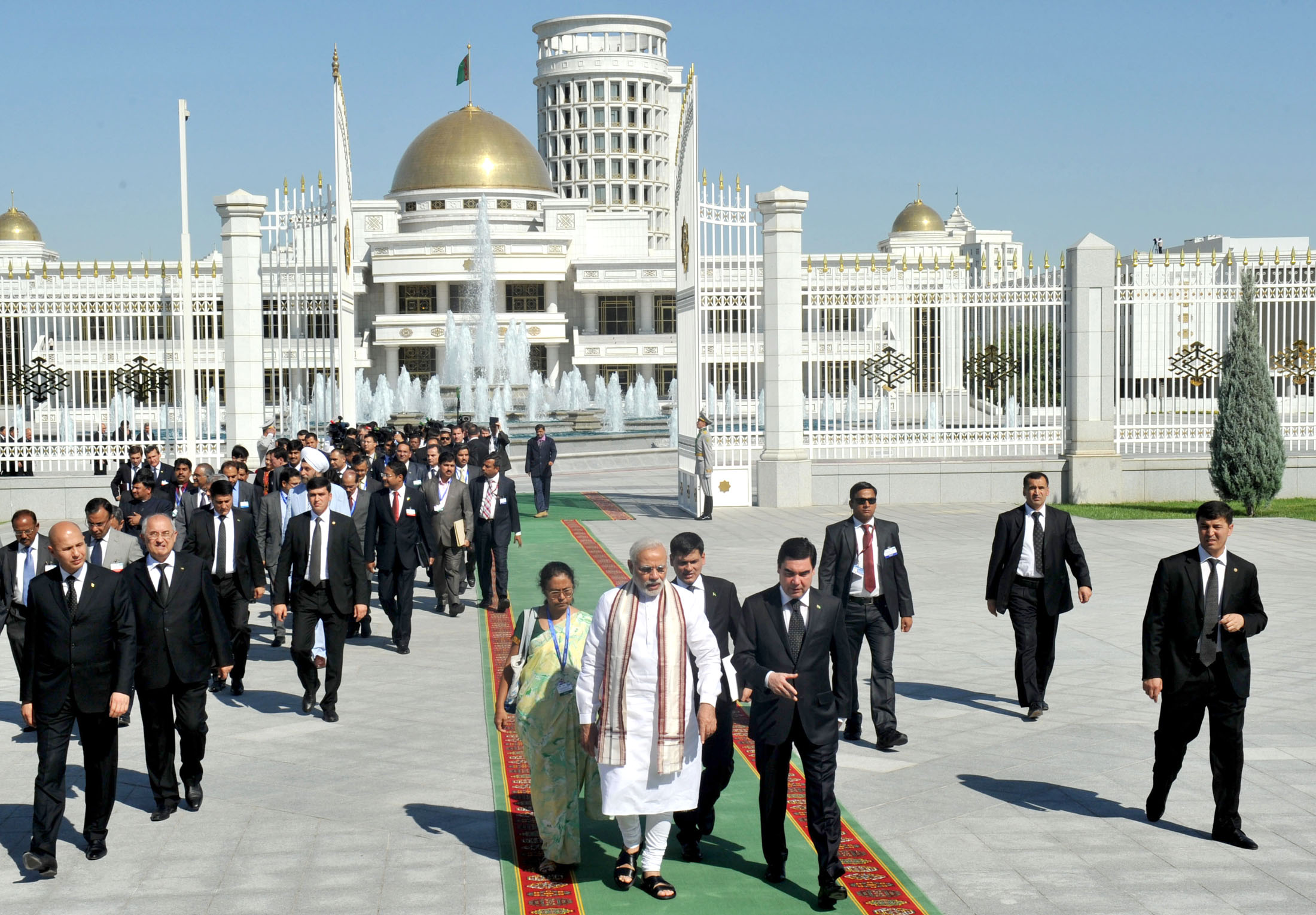
Narendra Modi being welcomed by the President of Turkmenistan Gurbanguly Berdimuhamedov at Independence Square in Oguzkhan Palace, Ashgabat, Turkmenistan, on July 11, 2015.

== Resident diplomatic missions ==
- India has an embassy in Ashgabat.
- Turkmenistan has an embassy in New Delhi.

== See also ==
- Foreign relations of India
- Foreign relations of Turkmenistan
