= Belarus–Turkmenistan relations =

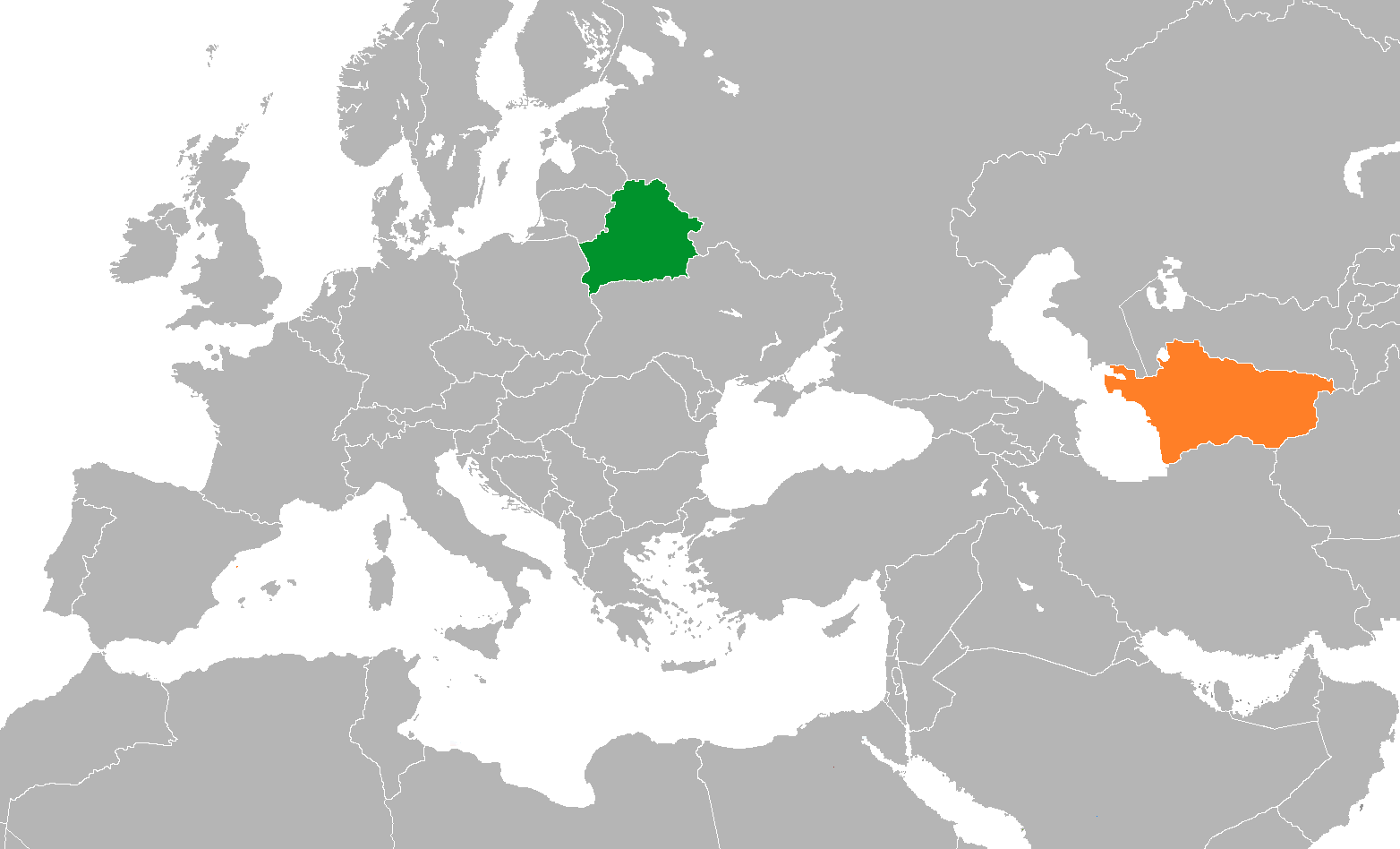

- Belarus: Turkmenistan

Belarus has an embassy in Ashgabat. Turkmenistan has an embassy in Minsk. Both countries are full members of the UN, and the OSCE. Belarus is a full member and Turkmenistan is associated with the CIS. Currently, the ambassador of Turkmenistan to Belarus is Murad Yazberdyev. The Belarusian Ambassador to Turkmenistan is Stanislav Chepurnoi.

== History ==
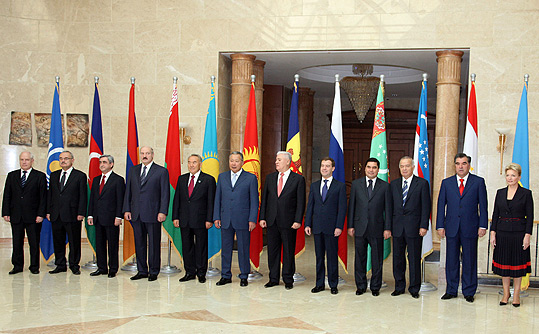
CIS 2008 summit in Bishkek (left to right): Sergei Lebedev, Artur Rasizade, Serzh Sargsyan, Alexander Lukashenko, Nursultan Nazarbayev, Kurmanbek Bakiyev, Vladimir Voronin, Dimitry Medvedev, Gurbanguly Berdimuhamedow, Islam Karimov, Emomali Rahmon and Raisa Bogatyrova.

Diplomatic relations were established 21 January 1993. Turkmenistan's embassy was opened in October 1995 in Minsk, with the first ambassador being Ilya Veljanov. The embassy Belarus to Turkmenistan opened in 2002. President of Belarus Alexander Lukashenko visited Turkmenistan four times (May 2002, June 2009, April 2011, and November 2013). In January 2010, the President of Turkmenistan Gurbanguly Berdimuhamedov visited Belarus.

== Trade and economic cooperation ==
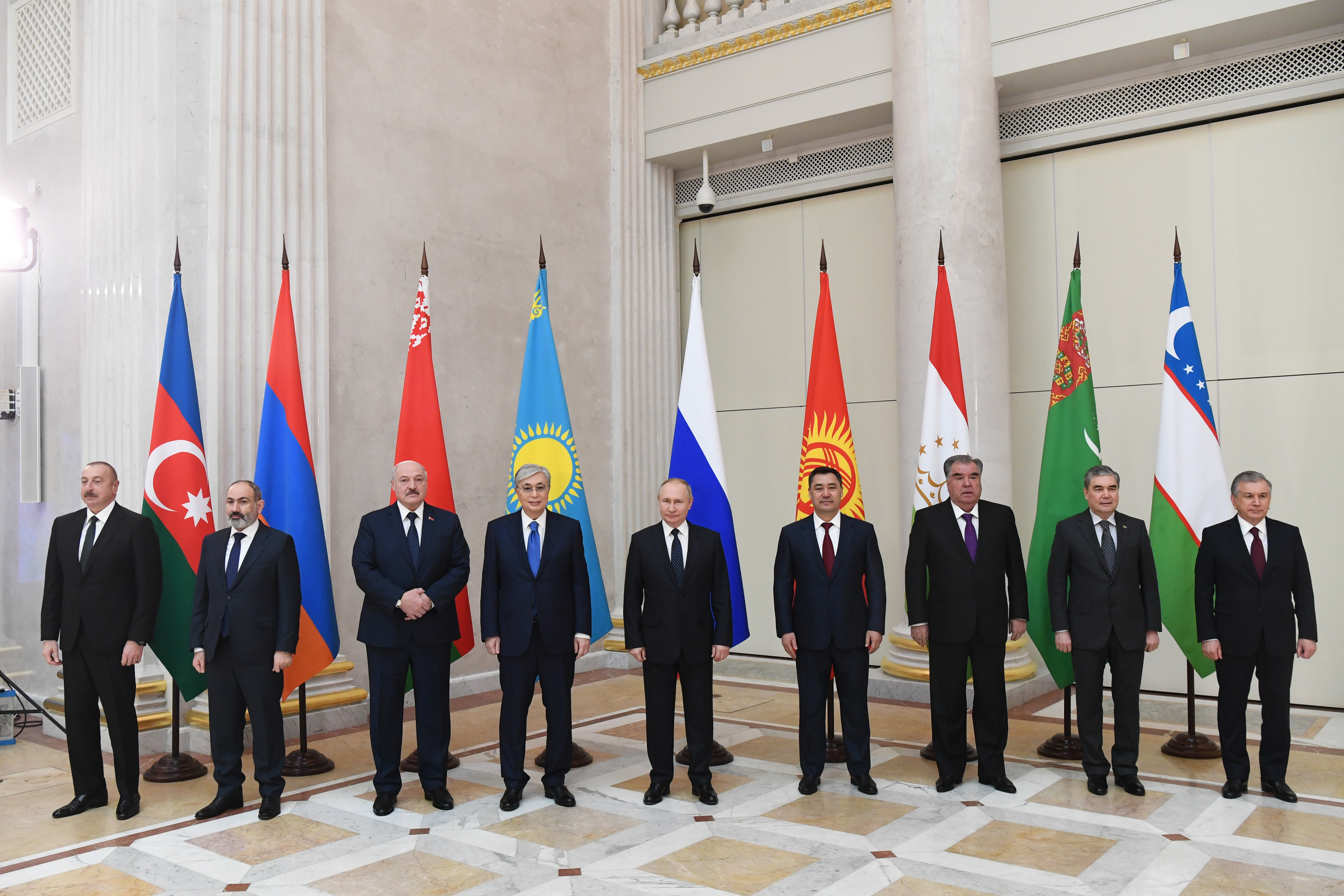
CIS leadership meeting in 2021

Trade turnover between the two countries in 2013 exceeded $300 million. Belarus exports to Turkmenistan engineering products: traffic, construction and agricultural machinery, municipal and urban passenger transport, tractors, trucks, as well as bicycles, trucks, pharmaceuticals, chemical fibers, wood products, food products. Belgorkhimprom builds Garlyk Mining Plant for the production of potash capacity of 1.4 million tons per year in the Lebap District Turkmenistan. The total contract value is $1 billion. In Minsk exists a Turkmen-Belarusian Trading House, and respectively in Ashgabat is a Belarusian-Turkmen Trade House.

== Cultural cooperation ==
Both countries held joint exhibitions and other events. Additionally, there are 7,400 Turkmen students studying at universities in Belarus.

== Resident diplomatic missions ==
- Belarus has an embassy in Ashgabat.
- Turkmenistan has an embassy in Minsk.

== See also ==
- Foreign relations of Belarus
- Foreign relations of Turkmenistan
