= Armenia–Turkmenistan relations =

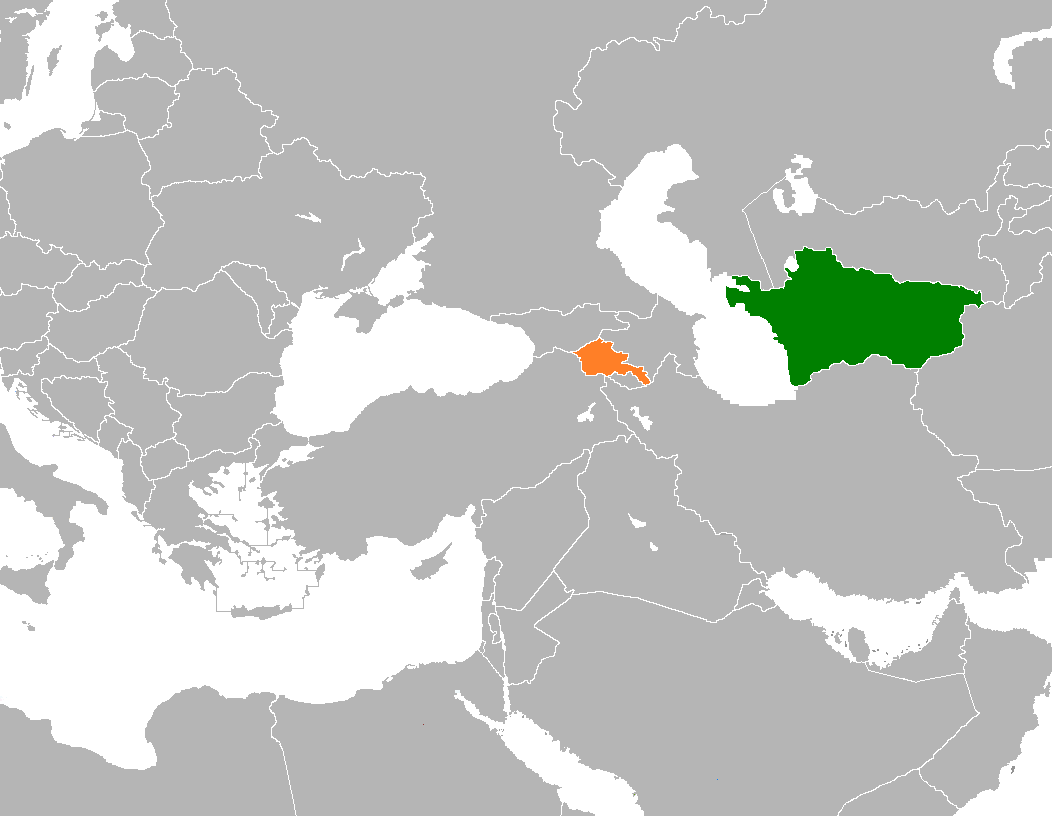

- Turkmenistan: Armenia

Bilateral diplomatic relations exist between Armenia and Turkmenistan. Armenia has an embassy in Ashgabat. Turkmenistan has an embassy in Yerevan.

== History ==
In the 19th century, both nations shared a similar fate, with Eastern Armenia and Turkmen lands conquered by the Russian Empire. According to the 1897 census, there were 4,256 Armenians in the four southern uezds of the Transcaspian Oblast, roughly corresponding to present-day Turkmenistan.

In 1990, following the Baku pogrom of Armenians, Saparmurat Niyazov received several ferries with Armenian refugees in Krasnovodsk. Subsequently, the Baku Armenians were scattered across Turkmenistan. Diplomatic relations were established on 9 October 1992. Armenia has had an embassy in Ashgabat since July 1994. During the visit of President Sargsyan in early October 2014, the opening of Days of Culture of Armenia in Turkmenistan at the tourist zone of Awaza on the Caspian Sea coast.

== Cultural relations ==
Currently, there are about 25,000-30,000 Armenians living in Turkmenistan, with the most significant portion living in Ashgabat (around 15,000), Türkmenbaşy (around 5,000-6,000), and Mary (around 5,000-6,000). Others live in cities like Balkanabat, in Turkmenabat, and in Tejen. Armenians living in Turkmenistan mainly speak the Karabakh or Syunik dialects of the Armenian language, with most of them also being fluent in the Turkmen and Russian languages. One of the three Armenian Sunday schools in Turkmenistan, operates under the supervision of the Embassy of Armenia, with the other two being founded with the support of the Ministry of Diaspora Affairs. In 2014, an Armenian class was opened in Elotan, ceasing to operate by 2017. The only Armenian cultural cite in Turkmenistan is the now non-operational Church of Turkmenbashi, built in 1903.

== Economic cooperation ==
Turkmen gas is delivered to Armenia via the territory of Iran. The issue of the construction of the Armenia-Iran gas pipeline was settled in 2004, with gas flowing through a 141 km long pipeline costing 120 million dollars.

== State visits between nations ==
=== Presidential visits from Armenia to Turkmenistan ===
- President Levon Ter-Petrosyan (1993)
- President Levon Ter-Peterosyan (1997)
- President Robert Kocharyan (2001)
- Minister of Foreign Affairs Eduard Nalbandyan (2009)
- President Serzh Sargsyan (2010)
- President Serzh Sargsyan (2014)
- Prime Minister Karen Karapetyan (2017)
- President Serzh Sargsyan (2017)

=== Presidential visits from Turkmenistan to Armenia ===
- President Saparmurat Niyazov (2001)
- President Gurbanguly Berdimuhamedow (2012)
- President Gurbanguly Berdimuhamedow (2017)

== Ambassadors of both nations ==
=== Ambassadors of Turkmenistan to Armenia ===
- Toili Kurbanov (2000-2003)
- Khadyr Saparlyev (2005-2007)
- Shohrat Jumaev (2007-2010)
- Ata Serdarov (2010-2013)
- Kurbannazar Nazarov (2013-2015)
- Muhammadniyaz Mashalov (2015–present)

=== Ambassadors of Armenia to Turkmenistan ===
- Aram Grigoryan (1994-2008)
- Vladimir Badalyan (2008–present)

== See also ==
- Foreign relations of Armenia
- Foreign relations of Turkmenistan
- Armenians in Turkmenistan
