= France–Turkmenistan relations =

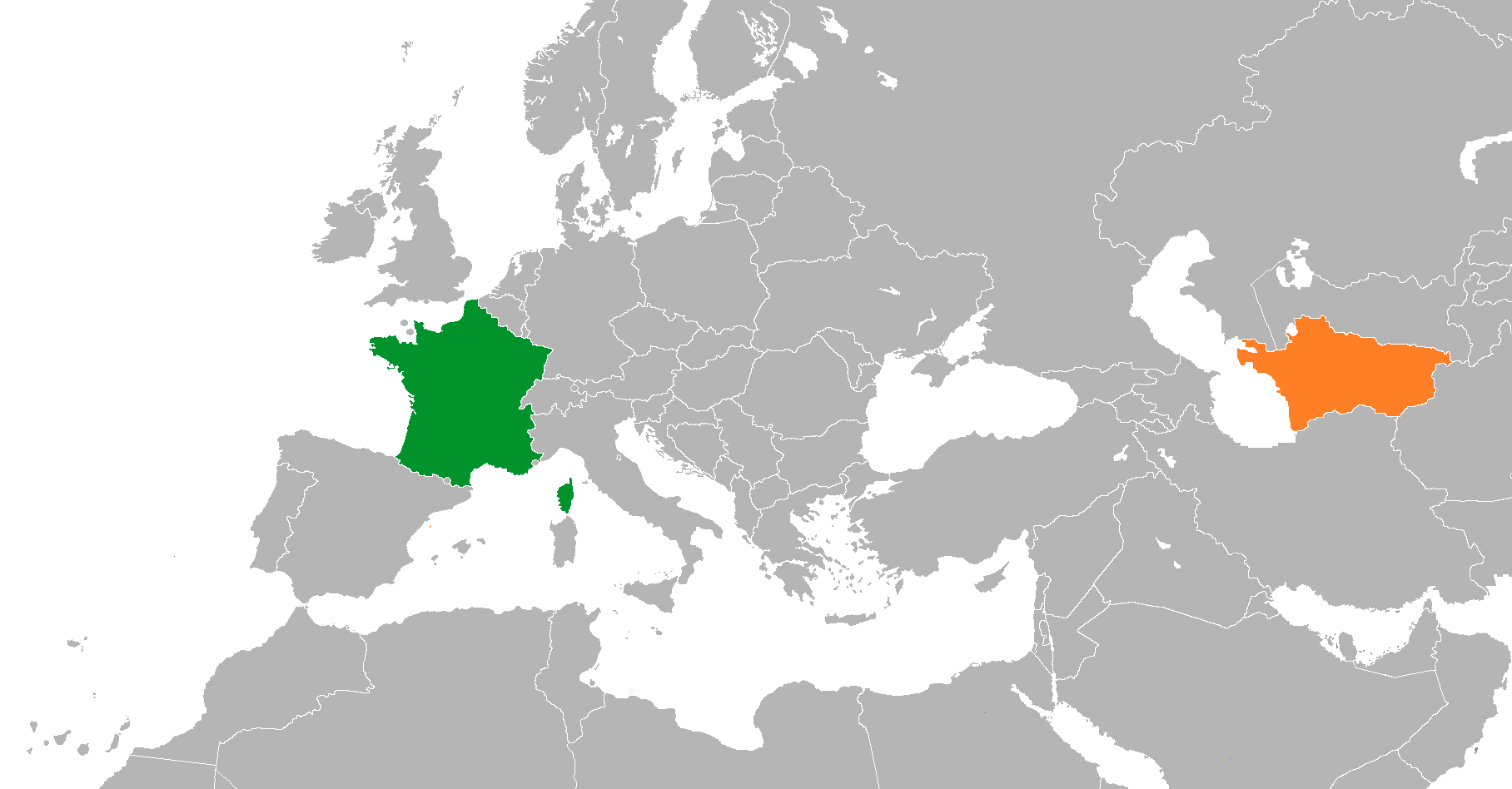
- France: Turkmenistan

France–Turkmenistan relations are bilateral relations between France and Turkmenistan. France has an embassy in Ashgabat and Turkmenistan has an embassy in Paris. Both countries are full members of the OSCE and the United Nations.

== History ==
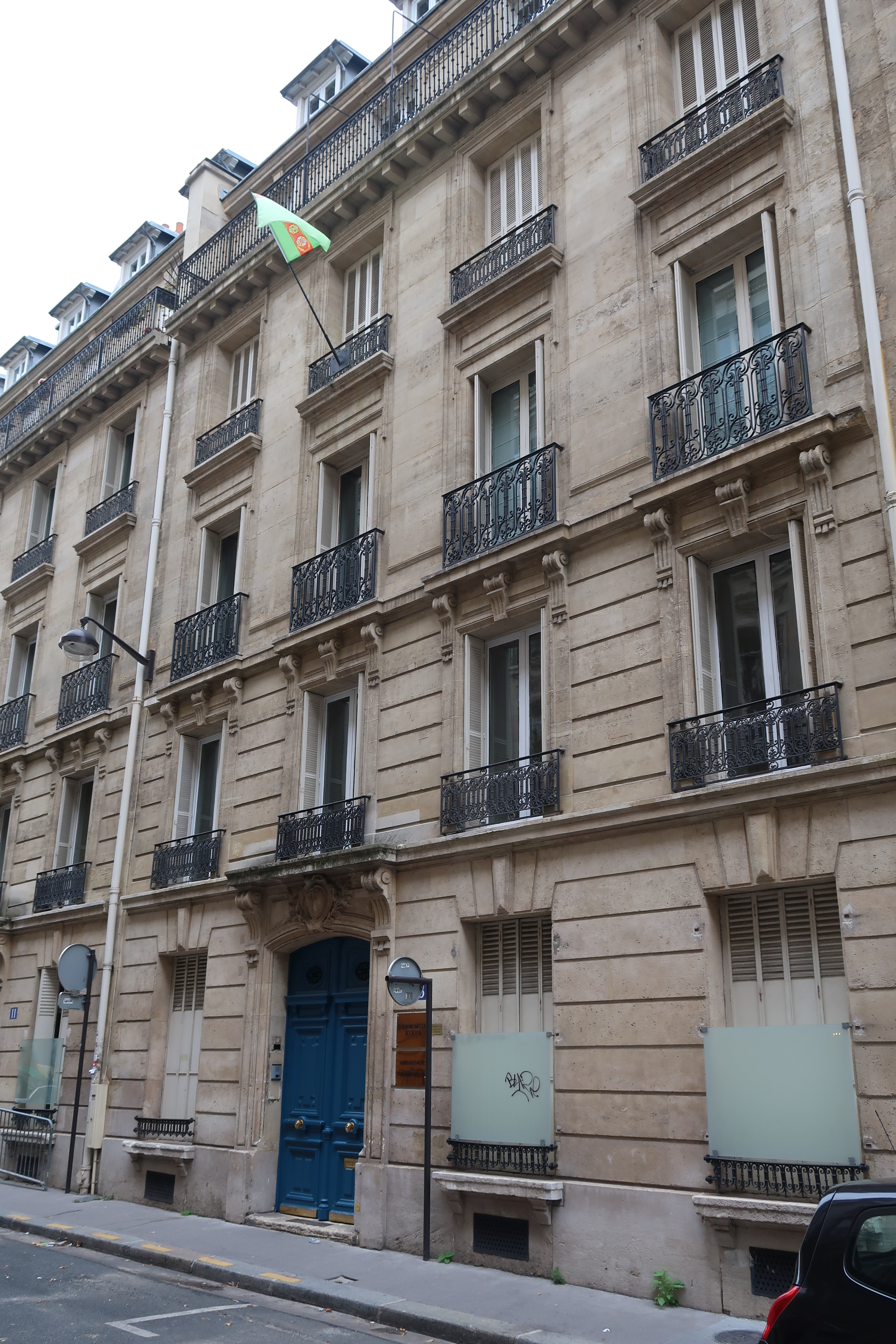
Embassy of Turkmenistan in Paris

Diplomatic relations were established on March 6, 1992 following the signing of a declaration of friendship. On May 28, 1994 France and Turkmenistan ratified a bilateral agreement for the reciprocal promotion and protection of investments.

== High level visits ==
The first official visit to Ashgabat by a French President was made on April 28, 1994 by François Mitterrand. 2 years later on September 9, 1996, President Saparmurat Niyazov paid an official visit to France, where he held talks with President Jacques Chirac, and Foreign Minister Hervé de Charette. In April 2008, French Minister of Foreign and European Affairs Bernard Kouchner visited Turkmenistan to inaugurate a new building of the French Embassy in Ashgabat, with the Ambassador of France to Turkmenistan Christian Lechervy. Gurbanguly Berdimuhamedow visited Paris twice during his presidency, holding talks with French President Nicolas Sarkozy on February 1, 2012, and attending a prestigious horse race in October of that year.

== Economic cooperation ==
First appeared on the Turkmen market in 1994, the French construction company Bouygues is the second largest in Turkmenistan and has signed contracts for the construction of buildings. French company Thales Alenia Space construction of the first space satellite TurkmenSat 1.

== Resident diplomatic missions ==
There is a French embassy in Ashgabat and a Turkmen embassy in Paris.

== See also ==
- Foreign relations of France
- Foreign relations of Turkmenistan
