= Turkmenistan–United Kingdom relations =

- Turkmenistan: United Kingdom

Diplomatic mission
- Embassy of Turkmenistan, London: Embassy of the United Kingdom, Ashgabat

Turkmenistan–United Kingdom relations are the bilateral relations between Turkmenistan and the United Kingdom of Great Britain and Northern Ireland. The two countries established diplomatic relations on 23 January 1992.

Both countries share common membership of the OSCE. Bilaterally the two countries have a Development Partnership, a Double Taxation Convention, and an Investment Agreement.

== Diplomatic missions ==
- Turkmenistan maintains an embassy in London.
- The UK is accredited to Turkmenistan through its embassy in Ashgabat.

== See also ==
- Foreign relations of Turkmenistan
- Foreign relations of the United Kingdom
