= Shamil Azizbayov =

Azerbaijani geologist

Shamil Azizbayov Şamil Əzizbəyov
- Born: February 16, 1906; Ashgabat, Transcaspian Oblast, Russian Turkestan, Russian Empire
- Died: May 14, 1976 (aged 70); Baku, Azerbaijan SSR, USSR

Shamil Abdurrahim oglu Azizbayov (1906–1976) was an Azerbaijani geologist specializing in petrology and metallogeny. He was one of the founders (1945) and a vice-president of the Azerbaijan National Academy of Sciences.

- Chairman of the Department of Geology, chemistry sciences and oil (1945–1947).
- Member of Presidium and academic Secretary of the Department of Earth Sciences of (1959–1976).
- Head of the Department of Crystallography, Mineralogy and Petrography of the Azerbaijan Industrial Institute (1945–1959).
- One of the founders of geology and petrography school in Azerbaijan.
- Honored scientist of Azerbaijan Republic (1960).
