= Fakhraddin Musayev =

National Hero of Azerbaijan

- Fəxrəddin Musa oğlu Musayev
- Born: 30 July 1957; Baýramaly, Turkmenistan SSR, USSR
- Died: 11 April 1992 (aged 34); Fuzuli District, Azerbaijan
- Military career
- Allegiance: Republic of Azerbaijan
- Branch: Azerbaijani Air and Air Defence Force
- Service years: 1991–1992
- Conflicts: First Nagorno-Karabakh War
- Awards: National Hero of Azerbaijan; 1992

Fakhraddin Musa oghlu Musayev (Azerbaijani: Fəxrəddin Musayev) (30 July 1957, Baýramaly, Turkmenistan – 11 April 1992, Fuzuli District, Azerbaijan) was the National Hero of Azerbaijan and warrior during the First Nagorno-Karabakh War.

== Early life and education ==
Fakhraddin Musayev was born on 30 July 1957 in Baýramaly, Turkmenistan. He went to secondary school from 1964 to 1974. He was drafted to the military service. Initially, he was sent to Czechoslovakia, and then completed his military service in the Orenburg Oblast. In 1979 he was admitted to the Civil Aviation School, where he graduated in 1982 with honors.

=== Personal life ===
Musayev was married and had one son.

== First Nagorno-Karabakh War ==
After the establishment of the national army, he returned to Azerbaijan and participated in military operations in Karabakh. In March 1992 he started to work as a pilot-operator in Mi-24 military helicopter. Fakhraddin destroyed most of the Armenian forces and armored vehicles with relative rocket strikes. On 11 April 1992, Lieutenant Fakhradin was killed when carrying out a missile attack in the territory of Fizuli region.

== Honors ==
Fakhraddin Musayev was posthumously awarded the title of the "National Hero of Azerbaijan" by Presidential Decree No. 833 dated 7 June 1992. He was buried in the Martyrs' Lane in Baku.

One of the central streets in Qusar District of Azerbaijan was named after him.

== See also ==
- First Nagorno-Karabakh War
- National Hero of Azerbaijan

== Sources ==
- Vugar Asgarov. Azərbaycanın Milli Qəhrəmanları (Yenidən işlənmiş II nəşr). Bakı: "Dərələyəz-M", 2010, səh. 218.
