= Foreign relations of Turkmenistan =

Turkmenistan's declaration of "permanent neutrality" was formally recognized by the United Nations in 1995. Former President Nyýazow stated that the neutrality would prevent Turkmenistan from participating in multi-national defense organizations, but allows military assistance. Its neutral foreign policy has an important place in the country's constitution. Although the Government of Turkmenistan claims to favour trade with and export to the United States, and Turkey, its single largest commercial partner is China, which buys the vast bulk of Turkmen natural gas via the Central Asia–China gas pipeline. Turkmenistan has significant commercial relationships with Russia and Iran and growing cross-border trade with Afghanistan. The Government of Turkmenistan often appears to use the conflicting interests of these regional powers as a means to extract concessions, especially on energy issues.

== International disputes ==
Signing of the Caspian Sea convention in 2018 brought only partial resolution of boundary disputes in the Caspian. Turkmenistan and Uzbekistan have disputes over water-sharing. Turkmenistan shares a long border with Afghanistan, a principal producer of heroin and opium. As a result, a large volume of narcotics are trafficked through Turkmenistan on their way to lucrative markets in Europe and Russia.

== Natural resources ==
Turkmenistan is rich in natural gas, and currently sells most of its gas to China. Turkmenistan unilaterally cut off exports of pipeline natural gas to Iran in 2017 over a payment arrears dispute. Russia ceased buying gas from Turkmenistan in 2016, but resumed small purchases of pipeline gas in 2019. Afghanistan buys liquid petroleum gas, shipped by rail to Ymamnazar and Torghundi for onward delivery by truck. Pakistan provides Turkmenistan warm water as well as Iran and Russia.

Turkmenistan is a partner country of the EU INOGATE energy programme, which has four key topics: enhancing energy security, convergence of member state energy markets on the basis of EU internal energy market principles, supporting sustainable energy development, and attracting investment for energy projects of common and regional interest.

== Organisations ==
Turkmenistan is a member of the United Nations, the International Monetary Fund, the World Bank, the Economic Cooperation Organization, the Organization for Security and Cooperation in Europe, the Organisation of Islamic Cooperation, the Islamic Development Bank, Asian Development Bank, European Bank for Reconstruction and Development, the Food and Agriculture Organization, and the International Organization of Turkic Culture.

Turkmenistan maintains permanent representatives to the United Nations offices in New York City, Vienna, and Geneva.

The United Nations maintains a permanent representation staffed by a resident coordinator along with representatives of some UN agencies in Ashgabat. The Asian Development Bank, European Bank for Reconstruction and Development, Organization for Security and Cooperation in Europe, and European Union have missions in Ashgabat, as well.

According to the European Commission's website, as of 2025, "A Partnership and Cooperation Agreement concluded with Turkmenistan in 1998 is yet to be ratified by all EU Member States. Pending ratification, an Interim Agreement on trade and trade-related matters entered into force on 1 August 2010. Other areas of cooperation remain based on the Trade and Cooperation Agreement signed with the Soviet Union in 1989 and subsequently endorsed by Turkmenistan."

== Diplomatic relations ==
List of countries which Turkmenistan maintains diplomatic relations with:

#	Country	Date
1	China	6 January 1992
2	North Korea	10 January 1992
3	Denmark	21 January 1992
4	United Kingdom	23 January 1992
5	South Korea	7 February 1992
6	Iran	18 February 1992
7	Afghanistan	21 February 1992
8	Saudi Arabia	22 February 1992
9	Bangladesh	28 February 1992
10	Turkey	29 February 1992
11	France	6 March 1992
12	Germany	6 March 1992
13	Spain	19 March 1992
14	Cuba	23 March 1992
15	Syria	26 March 1992
16	Mexico	27 March 1992
17	Russia	8 April 1992
18	Sweden	10 April 1992
19	United States	10 April 1992
20	Canada	17 April 1992
—	State of Palestine	17 April 1992
21	India	20 April 1992
22	Japan	22 April 1992
23	Mongolia	23 April 1992
24	Pakistan	9 May 1992
25	Hungary	11 May 1992
26	South Africa	11 May 1992
27	Australia	14 May 1992
28	Malaysia	17 May 1992
29	Bulgaria	20 May 1992
30	Netherlands	20 May 1992
31	Oman	29 May 1992
32	Norway	8 June 1992
33	Azerbaijan	9 June 1992
34	Italy	9 June 1992
35	Finland	10 June 1992
36	Greece	10 June 1992
37	Thailand	6 July 1992
38	Switzerland	13 July 1992
39	Georgia	16 July 1992
40	Lithuania	21 July 1992
41	Romania	21 July 1992
42	Vietnam	29 July 1992
43	Portugal	13 August 1992
44	New Zealand	8 September 1992
45	Ghana	17 September 1992
46	Argentina	24 September 1992
47	Maldives	25 September 1992
48	Morocco	25 September 1992
49	Poland	29 September 1992
50	Luxembourg	2 October 1992
51	Kazakhstan	5 October 1992
52	Moldova	5 October 1992
53	Armenia	9 October 1992
54	Kyrgyzstan	9 October 1992
55	Ukraine	10 October 1992
56	Austria	16 October 1992
57	Mali	16 November 1992
58	Tunisia	30 November 1992
59	Equatorial Guinea	8 December 1992
60	Libya	8 December 1992
61	Indonesia	10 December 1992
62	Slovakia	1 January 1993
63	Latvia	13 January 1993
64	Belarus	21 January 1993
65	Tajikistan	27 January 1993
66	Czech Republic	31 January 1993
67	Belgium	1 February 1993
68	Egypt	3 February 1993
69	Uzbekistan	7 February 1993
70	Jordan	18 February 1993
71	Malta	25 February 1993
72	Lebanon	6 May 1993
73	Philippines	23 July 1993
74	Israel	8 October 1993
75	Slovenia	11 November 1993
76	Zambia	2 December 1993
77	Laos	4 February 1994
78	Albania	24 March 1994
79	Chile	27 July 1994
80	Estonia	26 August 1994
81	Algeria	21 September 1994
82	Chad	4 October 1994
83	Kuwait	13 January 1995
84	Yemen	27 February 1995
85	Cambodia	6 April 1995
86	United Arab Emirates	10 October 1995
87	Madagascar	1 December 1995
88	Bahrain	15 December 1995
89	Brazil	3 April 1996
90	Sri Lanka	18 April 1996
91	Venezuela	30 April 1996
92	Bosnia and Herzegovina	17 June 1996
93	North Macedonia	21 June 1996
94	Croatia	2 July 1996
95	Bolivia	9 July 1996
—	Holy See	10 July 1996
96	Jamaica	16 July 1996
97	Uruguay	16 July 1996
98	Guatemala	22 August 1996
99	Serbia	26 August 1996
100	Colombia	27 August 1996
101	Nicaragua	29 August 1996
102	Belize	11 September 1996
103	Singapore	12 September 1996
104	Marshall Islands	8 October 1996
105	Mozambique	22 November 1996
106	Qatar	22 November 1996
107	Iceland	13 February 1997
108	Peru	7 May 1997
109	Ecuador	11 June 1997
110	Guyana	11 June 1997
111	Angola	18 June 1997
112	Mauritius	2 July 1997
113	Haiti	26 September 1997
114	Malawi	20 February 1998
115	Brunei	22 February 1999
116	Zimbabwe	22 March 1999
117	El Salvador	20 May 1999
118	Suriname	25 June 1999
119	Uganda	5 August 1999
120	Myanmar	26 August 1999
121	Nepal	17 October 2005
122	Ireland	16 October 2007
—	Sovereign Military Order of Malta	30 October 2007
123	Cyprus	13 November 2007
124	Andorra	17 April 2008
125	Montenegro	26 November 2008
126	Dominican Republic	9 February 2009
127	Iraq	31 July 2009
128	Gambia	9 August 2012
129	South Sudan	17 August 2012
130	Fiji	2 May 2014
131	Senegal	25 September 2014
132	Togo	25 September 2014
133	Panama	24 July 2015
134	Sudan	17 August 2015
135	Monaco	27 August 2015
136	Ethiopia	11 November 2015
137	Burundi	12 December 2015
138	Burkina Faso	12 March 2016
139	Bahamas	7 October 2016
140	Dominica	13 October 2016
141	Saint Kitts and Nevis	31 May 2017
142	Djibouti	4 July 2017
143	Paraguay	28 July 2017
144	Benin	26 July 2018
145	Somalia	4 November 2019
146	Grenada	13 February 2020
147	Sierra Leone	15 June 2020
148	Republic of the Congo	21 May 2021
149	Niger	22 June 2021
150	Kenya	14 March 2023
151	Trinidad and Tobago	21 June 2023
152	Seychelles	13 August 2024
153	Liechtenstein	1 November 2024
154	Honduras	12 June 2025
155	Rwanda	14 July 2025
156	Eswatini	5 August 2025
157	Botswana	20 October 2025
158	San Marino	7 November 2025
159	São Tomé and Príncipe	11 December 2025

== Bilateral relations ==
Country	Formal Relations Began	Notes
Afghanistan	21 February 1992	See Afghanistan–Turkmenistan relations Afghanistan has an embassy in Ashgabat and a consulate in Mary. Turkmenistan has an embassy in Kabul plus consulates in Herat and Mazar-i-Sharif. The rise of India as an economic giant and its increasing energy needs make Turkmenistan and Central Asia energy markets of choice for that country and also China. The Turkmenistan-Afghanistan-Pakistan-India pipeline (TAPI) has been one of the most important regional initiatives to be undertaken by these countries. The agreement to build the pipeline to transport Turkmen gas to Afghanistan and Pakistan and beyond to India was signed in 2010. In addition, Afghanistan depends on Turkmenistan for meeting a large part of the country's electricity needs. At present, Afghanistan imports more than 320 million kilowatt hours of electricity every year from Turkmenistan. In 2011, Turkmenistan agreed to build a 150-km extension to a railway line to connect the rail line to Serhetabat to Andkhoy in Faryab province, Afghanistan. In February 2018, the existing rail line between Serhetabat and Torghundi in Afghanistan was restored to service. This line is planned to be extended to Herat, where it could potentially connect to a rail line under construction from Khaf, Iran. The line to Andkhoy went into service in January 2021. In 2013, work began on a link from Kerki via Ymamnazar on the Turkmen-Afghan border to Aqina in Andkhoy District. This link was opened in November 2016. It was extended 38 km to Andkhoy in January 2021, and is intended eventually to become part of a railway corridor through northern Afghanistan, linking it via Sherkhan Bandar, Mazar-i-Sharif and Kunduz to Tajikistan. As of 1 April 2011, there were 44 enterprises with Afghan assets in Turkmenistan. Though Turkmenistan has not recognized the Taliban's state, the Islamic Emirate of Afghanistan, it has facilitated the Taliban's appointment of diplomats to the Afghan Embassy in Ashgabat. The current chargé d'affaires is Fazal Muhammad Sabir, appointed in March 2022.
Albania	24 March 1994	Both countries established diplomatic relations on March 24, 1994.
Armenia	9 October 1992	See Armenia–Turkmenistan relations: Formal relations were established in 1992; Armenia has an embassy in Ashgabat.; Turkmenistan has an embassy in Yerevan.; Both countries are full members of the Organization for Security and Co-operation in Europe.; There are between 30,000 and 44,000 people of Armenian descent living in Turkmenistan.
Austria	16 October 1992	See Austria–Turkmenistan relations Turkmenistan has an embassy in Vienna, which doubles as the permanent mission to United Nations agencies in Vienna.
Azerbaijan	9 June 1992	See Azerbaijan–Turkmenistan relations The two countries have embassies in each other's capitals. Despite close linguistic affinities (Turkmen and Azerbaijani are about 65 percent mutually intelligible), Turkmenistan and Azerbaijan suffer from a strained relationship, in part because Turkmenistan is majority Sunni and Azerbaijan is majority Shi'a. Nonetheless the two countries have begun to cooperate more in commercial spheres, most notably with signing of a memorandum in 2020 on joint exploitation of the cross-boundary Serdar oil field in the Caspian.
Belarus	21 January 1993	See Belarus–Turkmenistan relations: Formal relations were established in 1993; Belarus has an embassy in Ashgabat.; Turkmenistan has an embassy in Minsk.; Roughly 12,000 to 13,000 Turkmen university students are matriculated annually in Belarusian institutions of higher education.
Belize	11 September 1996	The countries established diplomatic relations on 11 September 1996.
Bulgaria		Bulgaria is accredited to Turkmenistan from its embassy in Moscow, Russia.; Turkmenistan is accredited to Bulgaria from its embassy in Astana, Kazakhstan.
Cambodia	6 April 1995	Both countries established diplomatic relations on 6 April 1995.
China	6 January 1992	See China-Turkmenistan relations The two countries have embassies in each other's capitals. The relationship is dominated by China's position as the largest importer by far of natural gas from Turkmenistan, making China Turkmenistan's largest source of foreign exchange earnings. China offers free higher education to several hundred Turkmen students each year.
Croatia	2 July 1996	See Croatia–Turkmenistan relations: Croatia is represented in Turkmenistan through its embassy in Ankara, Turkey.; Turkmenistan is represented in Croatia through its embassy in Bucharest, Romania.
Djibouti	4 July 2017	The countries established diplomatic relations on July 4, 2017.
Dominica	13 October 2016	Both countries established diplomatic relations on October 13, 2016.
France	6 March 1992	See France–Turkmenistan relations Diplomatic relations were established with the March 6, 1992 signing of the Protocol. The French construction company Bouygues, the second-largest in Turkmenistan, has signed many construction contracts. The French company Thales Alenia Space constructed the first space satellite TürkmenÄlem 52°E / MonacoSAT.: France has an embassy in Ashgabat.; Turkmenistan has an embassy in Paris.
Georgia	8 July 1992	Georgia has an embassy in Ashgabat, and Turkmenistan has an embassy in Tbilisi.
Germany	6 March 1992	The two countries have embassies in each other's capitals. Turkmenistan have a consulate in Frankfurt am Main. Two German banks, Deutsche Bank and Commerzbank, have offices in Ashgabat, since much of Turkmenistan's foreign exchange accounts are held in those two German banks. Such German firms as Siemens and Claas have made significant sales of medical and agricultural equipment, respectively, to Turkmenistan. Turkmenistan Air offers scheduled service to Frankfurt am Main.
Guyana	11 June 1997	Both countries established diplomatic relations on June 11, 1997.
Holy See	10 July 1996	The Vatican maintains a nunciature in Ashgabat, although the nuncio is resident in Ankara. The Turkmen ambassador in Rome is multiple-accredited, including to the Holy See.
Iceland	13 February 1997	Both countries established diplomatic relations on February 13, 1997.
India	20 April 1992	See India-Turkmenistan relations India and Turkmenistan have embassies in each other's capitals. Turkmenistan Airlines used to operate flights between Ashgabat and both New Delhi and Amritsar, which connect in Ashgabat to flights to London and Birmingham. India is a destination for medical tourism by middle-class Turkmen. To some degree the relationship is framed by Turkmenistan's desire to export natural gas to India via the Turkmenistan–Afghanistan–Pakistan–India Pipeline.
Iran	18 February 1992	See Iran–Turkmenistan relations Iran and Turkmenistan have had relations since Turkmenistan's independence from the Soviet Union in 1991. Iran has an embassy in Ashgabat and a consulate in Mary. Turkmenistan has an embassy in Teheran and a consulate in Mashhad. Iran was the second nation to recognize Turkmenistan as an independent nation. Since then, the two countries have cooperated in the economic, infrastructure, and energy sectors. The $139 million Körpeje-Kordkuy gas pipeline in western Turkmenistan and the $167 million Dostluk ("friendship" in Turkmen) Dam in the south of the country were built through a joint venture. The Caspian Sea territorial boundaries are a cause of tension between the two. Iran's Islamic theocracy and Turkmenistan's secular dictatorship also prevent the development of a closer friendship.
Israel	8 October 1993	Israel has an embassy in Ashgabat.
Italy	9 June 1992	Italy and Turkmenistan have embassies in each other's capitals. The Turkmen ambassador in Rome is also accredited to the United Nations agencies there, and to the Holy See. The relationship is dominated by the presence of Italian petroleum firm Eni, which operates oil wells in the Caspian Sea under a production sharing agreement.
Japan	22 April 1992	Diplomatic relations between Japan and Turkmenistan were established in April 1992. Japan opened an embassy at Ashgabat in January 2005, and Turkmenistan opened an embassy in Tokyo in May 2013. Japan is heavily involved in operation of the Oguz Han Engineering Technology University in Ashgabat. The Japan Bank for International Cooperation has financed several major industrial projects in Turkmenistan, including plants constructed with participation of Kawasaki and Sumitomo.
Kazakhstan	5 October 1992	See Kazakhstan–Turkmenistan relations: Kazakhstan has an embassy in Ashgabat and a consulate in Turkmenbashy.; Turkmenistan has an embassy in Astana and a consulate in Aqtau.; During a meeting in October 2023, Kazakhstan and Turkmenistan released a statement affirming their strategic partnership and cooperation. Kazakh Deputy Prime Minister and Foreign Minister Mūrat Nūrtıleu and Turkmen Deputy Prime Minister and Foreign Minister Raşit Meredow issued the statement during a meeting in Ashgabat on 30 October 2023.
Kyrgyzstan	5 October 1992	See Kyrgyzstan–Turkmenistan relations The two countries have embassies in each other's capitals.
Libya	8 December 1992	Libya maintains an economic and commercial office rather than an embassy in Ashgabat.
Malaysia	17 May 1992	See Malaysia-Turkmenistan relations Turkmen-Malaysian relations mainly revolve around the work of the Malaysian state petroleum corporation, Petronas, which extracts petroleum condensate in the Caspian Sea. Turkmenistan Airlines offers scheduled service between Ashgabat and Kuala Lumpur.
Mexico	27 March 1992	Mexico is accredited to Turkmenistan from its embassy in Ankara, Turkey.; Turkmenistan is accredited to Mexico from its embassy in Washington, D.C., United States.
Netherlands		Netherlands is represented in Turkmenistan through its embassy in Astana, Kazakhstan.; Turkmenistan is represented in Netherlands through its embassy in Brussels, Belgium.
North Macedonia	21 June 1996	The countries established diplomatic relations on June 21, 1996.
Pakistan	10 May 1992	See Pakistan–Turkmenistan relations: Formal relations were established on May 10, 1992. The countries have embassies in each other's capitals.; To celebrate the 10th anniversary of Turkmenistan's independence in 2001 Pakistan issued stamps bearing the flag of Turkmenistan.
Palestine	17 April 1992	Palestine has an embassy in Ashgabat.
Poland	29 September 1992	See Poland–Turkmenistan relations: Poland is represented in Turkmenistan through its embassy in Baku, Azerbaijan.; Turkmenistan is represented in Poland through its embassy in Berlin, Germany.
Qatar	22 November 1996	Qatar has an embassy in Ashgabat. Turkmenistan has no permanent diplomatic representation in Doha
Romania	21 July 1992	The two countries have embassies in each other's capitals. Romania's primary interest is development of the Lapis Lazuli corridor, which would use Romanian seaports on the Black Sea.
Russia	8 April 1992	See Russia–Turkmenistan relations: Russia has an embassy in Ashgabat and a consular office in Türkmenbaşy.; Turkmenistan has an embassy in Moscow and consulates in Astrakhan and Kazan.
Saudi Arabia	22 February 1992	Saudi Arabia has an embassy in Ashgabat, and Turkmenistan has an embassy in Riyadh.
Slovakia		Slovakia is accredited to Turkmenistan from its embassy in Tashkent, Uzbekistan.; Turkmenistan is accredited to Slovakia from its embassy in Vienna, Austria.
South Korea	7 February 1992	See South Korea–Turkmenistan relations Diplomatic relations were established on February 7, 1992. The countries have embassies in each other's capitals. South Korean firms such as Hyundai and LG have won major contracts for building industrial plants.
Spain	19 March 1992	Spain is accredited to Turkmenistan from its embassy in Moscow, Russia.; Turkmenistan is accredited to Spain from its embassy in Moscow, Russia.
Suriname	25 June 1999	The countries established diplomatic relations on June 25, 1999.
Sweden	10 April 1992	Both countries established diplomatic relations on April 10, 1992.
Switzerland	13 July 1992	Turkmenistan maintains a diplomatic mission in Geneva, which doubles as its embassy to Switzerland and is permanent representative to United Nations agencies in Geneva as well as to the World Trade Organization. The Swiss ambassador in Baku is accredited to Turkmenistan.
Tajikistan	27 January 1993	Tajikistan has an embassy in Ashgabat.; Turkmenistan has an embassy in Dushanbe.
Turkey	29 February 1992	See Turkey–Turkmenistan relations: Turkey was the first state to recognize Turkmenistan on October 27, 1991.; Turkmenistan has an embassy in Ankara and a consulate in Istanbul; Turkey has an embassy in Ashgabat.; Both countries are members of Economic Cooperation Organization, International Organization of Turkic Culture and OIC.; Trade volume between the two countries was 1.35 billion USD in 2019 (Turkmen exports/imports: 601/745 million USD. Turkish firms Çalık Holding, Polimeks, Rönesans, GAP Inşaat and Tepe Inşaat have garnered billions of dollars of construction contracts since 1992.
Ukraine	10 October 1992	Ukraine and Turkmenistan have embassies in each other's capitals. Ukrainian companies have been involved in major construction projects, including the rail and automobile bridges across the Amu Darya at Türkmenabat.
United Arab Emirates	10 October 1995	The countries have embassies in each other's capitals. In addition, Turkmenistan has a consulate in Dubai. The Emirates are a major entrepot for imports of foodstuffs and consumer items into Turkmenistan. In addition, one of three oil-drilling concessions in the Caspian Sea is held by Dragon Oil, which is wholly owned by the Emirates National Oil Company. The international office of Turkmenistan's TAPI Pipeline Company is in Dubai.
United Kingdom	23 January 1992	See Turkmenistan–United Kingdom relations The UK established diplomatic relations with the United Kingdom on 23 January 1992.: Turkmenistan maintains an embassy in London.; The UK is accredited to Turkmenistan through its embassy in Ashgabat.; Both countries share common membership of the OSCE. Bilaterally the two countries have a Development Partnership, a Double Taxation Convention, and an Investment Agreement.
United States	10 April 1992	See Turkmenistan–United States relations The United States and Turkmenistan continue to disagree about the latter country's path toward democratic and economic reform. The United States has publicly advocated industrial and agricultural privatization, market liberalization, and fiscal reform, as well as legal and regulatory reforms to open up the economy to foreign trade and investment, as the best way to achieve prosperity and true independence and sovereignty.: Turkmenistan has an embassy in Washington, D.C., and a mission to the United Nations in New York City. The Turkmen ambassador is accredited to Canada and Mexico, as well.; A United States embassy, including a USAID country office, is located in Ashgabat.
Uzbekistan	7 February 1993	See Turkmenistan–Uzbekistan relations: Turkmenistan has an embassy in Tashkent.; Uzbekistan has an embassy in Ashgabat.
Venezuela	30 April 1996	Venezuela briefly opened an embassy in Ashgabat following a state visit by Hugo Chávez, but the staff returned to Teheran after six months. A chancery is located in Ashgabat, but the bilateral relationship is managed by the Venezuelan embassy in Iran.
Zimbabwe	22 March 1999	Both countries established diplomatic relations on March 22, 1999.

== See also ==
- List of diplomatic missions in Turkmenistan
- List of diplomatic missions of Turkmenistan
