= Turkmenization =

Turkmenization is the set of domestic policies the Niyazov administration used in Turkmenistan from 1991–2006 to force ethnic minorities to adopt Turkmen culture. Those who resisted the state-sponsored cultural transformation were often deported.

Antoine Blua of Radio Free Europe defined Turkmenization as the "policy of the Turkmen government targeting the education, employment, and religion of all of the country's non-Turkmen ethnic groups."

== Homogenization policy ==
Shukrat Babajanov and Khurmat Babadjanov of Radio Free Europe/Radio Liberty's Uzbek Service said that following Turkmenistan's independence, the Niyazov administration had fired most non-ethnic Turkmen civil servants. Officials had to prove they had three generations of Turkmen heritage to be hired. Russian language schools were closed except for one that catered to elites, and the government worked to squeeze Russian from public discourse, including roadside advertisements, while mandating Turkmen as the national language. Informal social control was used to ensure that citizens speak Turkmen and wear traditional Turkmen clothing. Uzbek women who try to marry Turkmen men were exiled to Uzbekistan with their children. Babajanov and Babadjanov claimed that these policies led to Russians, Kazakhs, and Uzbeks to emigrate.

In a few instances Uzbek children in Turkmen schools were instructed to wear Turkmen clothing or be expelled from school.

== Marriage discrimination ==
Ziyoda Ruzimova, an ethnic Uzbek woman who lived in Turkmenistan, married an ethnic Turkmen in 1994 and had four children. In order to attend public school, parents had to register the birth with the government. Ruzimova did not register her marriage or her children's births at the time. When she tried to get a marriage license in February 2006, she claimed that the government brought her and her children to the Shovat border post and turned her family over to Uzbek border guards. Ruzimova says her family had no money, although the border guards gave her 1,000 soum (US$0.85). "Then they called a taxi to take us [to my grandmother's home]." At the border the Uzbek guards kept her family on a grate where they slept. "For the children, they provided a piece of fabric; the children got a mattress, but I slept on the cement."

Mahmud Tangriberganov, head of the Gozovot village council, expressed opposition to Turkmenistan's policies, saying, "These are our relatives; these are Uzbeks. And they say that because you are Uzbek, you must leave. Why didn't [the authorities] register their marriages, the births of their children? They could have asked them to pay fines and that way they could have kept the families together, but they didn't do that."

== Ethnic discrimination ==
The region around the Turkmenistan–Uzbekistan border is known as Khorezm to Uzbeks and Dashoguz to Turkmen. Copies of Niyazov's Ruhnama and the Turkmen flag are located at the entrance of every mosque and Russian Orthodox church. Believers must touch the Ruhnama prior to entering the building. In 2006 the government replaced ethnic Uzbek imam-hatybs with ethnic Turkmens in Dashoguz. Uzbeks comprise over 50% of the population of Dashoguz. Norwegian human rights activist Igor Rotar said, "Historically, in the Soviet times for example, most imam-hatybs in this region were [Uzbeks]. But now most of [them] are Turkmen. This is a problem because local Uzbeks complained that Turkmen imams have no good education and prefer that imam-hatybs [are] Uzbeks." In the Kunya-Urgench district in Dashoguz, Uzbek imam-hatybs were not allowed to work at Muslim cemeteries and holy sites. All sermons were required to begin with praise of Niyazov. Ethnic Russians were dismissed from workplaces, while those holding dual Russian-Turkmen citizenship were given three months to renounce their Russian citizenship or face the confiscation of their property and forced departure from the country. Foreign-educated Turkmen citizens—including those with Soviet-era degrees from institutions elsewhere in the Soviet Union—were dismissed from their jobs in 2004.

== See also ==
- Turkification
- Azerbaijanization
