= Metallogeny =

Study of the genesis and geographic distribution of mineral deposits

Metallogeny is the study of the genesis and regional-to-global distribution of mineral deposits, with emphasis on their relationship in space and time to regional petrologic and tectonic features of the Earth's crust. The term metallogeny (métallogénie) was created by Louis de Launay, a professor at the Ecole des Mines de Paris, in his 1913 book.
