= Məmmədxanlı =

Məmmədxanlı may refer to:

- Məmmədxanlı, Khachmaz, Azerbaijan
- Məmmədxanlı, Masally, Azerbaijan

== See also ==
- Məmmədcanlı, Jalilabad, Azerbaijan
