= İlxıçı =

İlxıçı or Ilxıçı or Ilkhychi or Ilkhychy may refer to:

- İlxıçı, Agsu, Azerbaijan
- İlxıçı, Khachmaz, Azerbaijan
- İlxıçı, Sayad, Khachmaz Rayon, Azerbaijan
