= Qarğalıq =

Qarğalıq or Kargalyk or Qargalig may refer to:

- Qarğalıq, Khachmaz, Azerbaijan
- Qarğalıq, Masally, Azerbaijan
