= Sayad, Azerbaijan =

Sayad
- Municipality
- Location within Azerbaijan
- Coordinates: 41°24′44″N 48°56′20″E
- Country: Azerbaijan
- Rayon: Khachmaz

Population
  - Total: 1,247
- Time zone: UTC+4 (AZT)
  - Summer (DST): UTC+5 (AZT)

Sayad (also, Sayat) is a village and municipality in the Khachmaz Rayon of Azerbaijan. It has a population of 1,247. The municipality consists of the villages of Sayad and İlxıçı.
