= Məmmədxanlı, Masally =

Məmmədxanlı
- Municipality
- Location within Azerbaijan
- Coordinates: 39°05′43″N 48°42′55″E
- Country: Azerbaijan
- Rayon: Masally

Population
  - Total: 469
- Time zone: UTC+4 (AZT)
  - Summer (DST): UTC+5 (AZT)

Məmmədxanlı (also, Mamedkhanly) is a village and municipality in the Masally Rayon of Azerbaijan. It has a population of 469.
