= İlxıçı, Agsu =

İlxıçı
- Municipality
- Location within Azerbaijan
- Coordinates: 40°29′49″N 48°17′54″E
- Country: Azerbaijan
- Rayon: Agsu

Population
  - Total: 781
- Time zone: UTC+4 (AZT)
  - Summer (DST): UTC+5 (AZT)

İlxıçı (also, Ilxıçı, Ilkhychi, and Ilkhychy) is a village and municipality in the Agsu Rayon of Azerbaijan. It has a population of 781.
