= Qarğalıq, Masally =

Qarğalıq
- Municipality
- Location within Azerbaijan
- Coordinates: 39°04′37″N 48°44′52″E
- Country: Azerbaijan
- Rayon: Masally

Population
  - Total: 1,516
- Time zone: UTC+4 (AZT)
  - Summer (DST): UTC+5 (AZT)

Qarğalıq (also, Qarğalıg and Kargalyk) is a village and municipality in the Masally Rayon of Azerbaijan. It has a population of 1,516.
