= Məmmədcanlı =

- Municipality
- Location within Azerbaijan
- Coordinates: 39°17′56″N 48°21′21″E
- Country: Azerbaijan
- Rayon: Jalilabad

Population
  - Total: 256
- Time zone: UTC+4 (AZT)
  - Summer (DST): UTC+5 (AZT)

Məmmədcanlı (also, Mamed-Dzhanly) is a village and municipality in the Jalilabad Rayon of Azerbaijan. It has a population of 256.
