= İlxıçı, Khachmaz =

İlxıçı
- Municipality
- Location within Azerbaijan
- Coordinates: 41°27′52″N 48°55′48″E
- Country: Azerbaijan
- Rayon: Khachmaz

Population
  - Total: 617
- Time zone: UTC+4 (AZT)
  - Summer (DST): UTC+5 (AZT)

İlxıçı (also, Ilxıçı, Gasan Efendi, Həsən Əfəndi, Il’khychy-Gasanefendi, Il’kichi-Kazeya, and Ilkhychy) is a village and municipality in the Khachmaz Rayon of Azerbaijan. It has a population of 617. The municipality consists of the villages of İlxıçı and Qarğalıq.
