= Qarğalıq, Khachmaz =

Qarğalıq
- Location within Azerbaijan
- Coordinates: 41°27′20″N 48°58′20″E
- Country: Azerbaijan
- Rayon: Khachmaz
- Municipality: İlxıçı
- Time zone: UTC+4 (AZT)
  - Summer (DST): UTC+5 (AZT)

Qarğalıq (also, Kargalyk and Il’kychy-Gasanefendi) is a village in the Khachmaz Rayon of Azerbaijan. The village forms part of the municipality of İlxıçı.
