= Məmmədxanlı, Khachmaz =

Məmmədxanlı
- Location within Azerbaijan
- Coordinates: 41°24′54″N 48°59′56″E
- Country: Azerbaijan
- Rayon: Khachmaz
- Municipality: Sayad
- Time zone: UTC+4 (AZT)
  - Summer (DST): UTC+5 (AZT)

Məmmədxanlı (known as İlxıçı or İlxıçı-Məmmədxan until 2015) is a village in the Khachmaz Rayon of Azerbaijan. The village forms part of the municipality of Sayad.
