= List of municipalities in Lebap Province =

Map of the five provinces of Turkmenistan. Lebap is highlighted in red.

This article is referencing as a list all lawfully recognized municipalities of Lebap Province, Turkmenistan. Since 19 September 2025, there are 466 municipalities in Lebap, including one city with district status, 14 cities, 24 towns, and 427 villages.

In Turkmenistan, any administrative division, including municipalities, is designated by law and may be changed by decree by the Assembly of Turkmenistan, as stated by the 23rd article of the constitution. They all are referenced in a list rarely shared by the Turkmen government, yet available for consultation through the 2022 census.

Criticized by external observers, the census figures should be taken very carefully as they seem to overestimate the actual population of the country.

== Lists ==
Municipalities listed here are sorted by their administrative division, then by alphabetical order.

=== Cities ===
Cities with district status are bolded.

| Name | Population (2022) | District |
|---|---|---|
| Dänew | 15,409 | Dänew |
| Seýdi | 29,670 | Dänew |
| Darganata | 13,777 | Darganata |
| Gazojak | 21,035 | Darganata |
| Dostluk | 13,655 | Döwletli District |
| Farap | 20,547 | Farap |
| Garabekewül | 15,135 | Garabekewül |
| Halaç | 20,778 | Halaç |
| Hojambaz | 13,485 | Hojambaz |
| Kerki | 32,489 | Kerki |
| Köýtendag | 18,816 | Köýtendag |
| Magdanly | 44,508 | Köýtendag |
| Sakar | 12,769 | Saýat |
| Saýat | 21,619 | Saýat |
| **Türkmenabat** | 230,861 | **Türkmenabat** |

=== Towns ===
| Name | Population (2022) | District |
|---|---|---|
| Çärjew | 1,825 | Çärjew District |
| Hojagala | 4,752 | Çärjew District |
| Kiştiwan | 5,989 | Çärjew District |
| Asuda | 6,807 | Dänew District |
| Bahar | 3,090 | Dänew District |
| Garaşsyzlyk | 7,136 | Dänew District |
| Lebap | 3,058 | Darganata District |
| Amyderýa | 10,330 | Döwletli District |
| Döwletli | 4,942 | Döwletli District |
| Kerkiçi | 14,996 | Döwletli District |
| Jeýhun | 9,496 | Farap District |
| Yslam | 4,869 | Garabekewül District |
| Çohpetde | 7,503 | Halaç District |
| Beşir | 6,971 | Hojambaz District |
| Astanababa | 11,466 | Kerki District |
| Başsaka | 3,498 | Kerki District |
| Garamätnyýaz | 1,844 | Kerki District |
| Garaşsyzlygyň 15 ýyllygy | 1,598 | Kerki District |
| Garlyk | 16 | Köýtendag District |
| Gurşun magdan käni | 3,953 | Köýtendag District |
| Kelif | 3,701 | Köýtendag District |
| Mukry | 7,013 | Köýtendag District |
| Çaltut | 4,857 | Saýat District |
| Suwçyoba | 1,758 | Saýat District |

=== Villages ===
Villages which hold the seat of their rural council are bolded.

| Name | Population (2022) | District | Included in |
|---|---|---|---|
| Gumly | 1,759 | Çärjew District | Amyderýa geňeşligi |
| Guýymugal | 1,401 | Çärjew District | Amyderýa geňeşligi |
| Hydyrili | 1,164 | Çärjew District | Amyderýa geňeşligi |
| Täzeoba | 1,448 | Çärjew District | Amyderýa geňeşligi |
| Ýokarymugal | 1,004 | Çärjew District | Amyderýa geňeşligi |
| **Zähmetkeş** | 2,570 | Çärjew District | Amyderýa geňeşligi |
| Zarpçy | 1,200 | Çärjew District | Amyderýa geňeşligi |
| **Açyl Mürzäýew** | 3,714 | Çärjew District | Balta Myradow adyndaky geňeşlik |
| Balta Myradow | 1,655 | Çärjew District | Balta Myradow adyndaky geňeşlik |
| Baýatlar | 1,605 | Çärjew District | Balta Myradow adyndaky geňeşlik |
| Bereketli | 2,566 | Çärjew District | Balta Myradow adyndaky geňeşlik |
| Birleşik | 1,156 | Çärjew District | Balta Myradow adyndaky geňeşlik |
| Hojamekan | 811 | Çärjew District | Balta Myradow adyndaky geňeşlik |
| Ulyçarlak | 2,364 | Çärjew District | Balta Myradow adyndaky geňeşlik |
| Egrigüzer | 1,472 | Çärjew District | Bereket geňeşligi |
| Gazagoba | 195 | Çärjew District | Bereket geňeşligi |
| Gaýybaýat | 2,139 | Çärjew District | Bereket geňeşligi |
| Gökler | 2,137 | Çärjew District | Bereket geňeşligi |
| Rowaçlyk | 1,537 | Çärjew District | Bereket geňeşligi |
| Täzeaý | 1,118 | Çärjew District | Bereket geňeşligi |
| **Ýasydepe** | 3,053 | Çärjew District | Bereket geňeşligi |
| Adak | 233 | Çärjew District | Boýrabap geňeşligi |
| Baýdakçy | 2,074 | Çärjew District | Boýrabap geňeşligi |
| Boýrabap | 714 | Çärjew District | Boýrabap geňeşligi |
| Galkynyş | 828 | Çärjew District | Boýrabap geňeşligi |
| **Gaýmakçy** | 1,635 | Çärjew District | Boýrabap geňeşligi |
| Hojamiresen | 5,631 | Çärjew District | Boýrabap geňeşligi |
| Petdeli | 191 | Çärjew District | Boýrabap geňeşligi |
| Tally | 2,665 | Çärjew District | Boýrabap geňeşligi |
| Darganly | 1,284 | Çärjew District | Çärjew |
| Garawul | 1,284 | Çärjew District | Çärjew |
| Marküş | 2,979 | Çärjew District | Çärjew |
| Orazaly | 1,046 | Çärjew District | Çärjew |
| Ulywahym | 2,109 | Çärjew District | Çärjew |
| Ýaňyaryk | 687 | Çärjew District | Çärjew |
| Babadaýhan | 1,324 | Çärjew District | Hojaili geňeşligi |
| **Bekaryk** | 2,564 | Çärjew District | Hojaili geňeşligi |
| Dogryýap | 1,406 | Çärjew District | Hojaili geňeşligi |
| Dostluk | 722 | Çärjew District | Hojaili geňeşligi |
| Duryýap | 1,805 | Çärjew District | Hojaili geňeşligi |
| Hojaaryk | 1,047 | Çärjew District | Hojaili geňeşligi |
| Hojaili | 1,467 | Çärjew District | Hojaili geňeşligi |
| Kerpiçli | 538 | Çärjew District | Hojaili geňeşligi |
| Pagtaçy | 3,384 | Çärjew District | Hojaili geňeşligi |
| Peşelioba | 1,176 | Çärjew District | Hojaili geňeşligi |
| Sahyjan | 926 | Çärjew District | Hojaili geňeşligi |
| Ýeňiş | 2,183 | Çärjew District | Hojaili geňeşligi |
| Bagtyýarlyk | 1,784 | Çärjew District | Kiştiwan |
| Garagum | 1,877 | Çärjew District | Kiştiwan |
| Ikinji Çärjew | 1,013 | Çärjew District | Kiştiwan |
| Mekan | 924 | Çärjew District | Kiştiwan |
| Miras | 2,499 | Çärjew District | Kiştiwan |
| Nebitçi | 140 | Çärjew District | Kiştiwan |
| Parahatçylyk | 2,401 | Çärjew District | Kiştiwan |
| Ussaçy | 662 | Çärjew District | Kiştiwan |
| Ak altyn | 188 | Çärjew District | Kölaryk geňeşligi |
| Araplar | 1,912 | Çärjew District | Kölaryk geňeşligi |
| Asudalyk | 1,778 | Çärjew District | Kölaryk geňeşligi |
| Balykçy | 1,094 | Çärjew District | Kölaryk geňeşligi |
| Esgioba | 793 | Çärjew District | Kölaryk geňeşligi |
| Joraýew | 1,317 | Çärjew District | Kölaryk geňeşligi |
| **Kölaryk** | 4,415 | Çärjew District | Kölaryk geňeşligi |
| Könegulançy | 1,422 | Çärjew District | Kölaryk geňeşligi |
| Üçbaş | 1,046 | Çärjew District | Kölaryk geňeşligi |
| Çömmekdepe | 1,402 | Çärjew District | Nobat Gutlyýew adyndaky geňeşlik |
| Çöpligarawul | 1,435 | Çärjew District | Nobat Gutlyýew adyndaky geňeşlik |
| Könearyk | 1,071 | Çärjew District | Nobat Gutlyýew adyndaky geňeşlik |
| Magtymguly Pyragy | 1,206 | Çärjew District | Nobat Gutlyýew adyndaky geňeşlik |
| **Nobat Gutlyýew** | 3,606 | Çärjew District | Nobat Gutlyýew adyndaky geňeşlik |
| Owlakdepe | 2,184 | Çärjew District | Nobat Gutlyýew adyndaky geňeşlik |
| Saýatly | 1,152 | Çärjew District | Nobat Gutlyýew adyndaky geňeşlik |
| Saýatlyoba | 916 | Çärjew District | Nobat Gutlyýew adyndaky geňeşlik |
| Täzedurmuş | 1,135 | Çärjew District | Nobat Gutlyýew adyndaky geňeşlik |
| Ýaşlar | 685 | Çärjew District | Nobat Gutlyýew adyndaky geňeşlik |
| Ýokaryaryk | 2,057 | Çärjew District | Nobat Gutlyýew adyndaky geňeşlik |
| Agalaň | 1,911 | Çärjew District | Sarykbala geňeşligi |
| Dogryýol | 1,321 | Çärjew District | Sarykbala geňeşligi |
| Döwletli | 1,234 | Çärjew District | Sarykbala geňeşligi |
| Gagarin | 1,239 | Çärjew District | Sarykbala geňeşligi |
| Garawuldepe | 1,237 | Çärjew District | Sarykbala geňeşligi |
| Gurluşykçy | 233 | Çärjew District | Sarykbala geňeşligi |
| Guýyaryk | 949 | Çärjew District | Sarykbala geňeşligi |
| **Sarykbala** | 2,328 | Çärjew District | Sarykbala geňeşligi |
| Alagöz | 2,577 | Çärjew District | Zergär geňeşligi |
| Arap | 1,427 | Çärjew District | Zergär geňeşligi |
| Döwletmämmet Azady | 552 | Çärjew District | Zergär geňeşligi |
| Düýeçi | 2,353 | Çärjew District | Zergär geňeşligi |
| **Gyzylýap** | 2,132 | Çärjew District | Zergär geňeşligi |
| Hojamaşat | 1,492 | Çärjew District | Zergär geňeşligi |
| Seýdi | 186 | Çärjew District | Zergär geňeşligi |
| Şyhlar | 439 | Çärjew District | Zergär geňeşligi |
| Zergär | 1,109 | Çärjew District | Zergär geňeşligi |
| Abadan | 1,845 | Dänew District | Aşgabat geňeşligi |
| Amyderýa | 632 | Dänew District | Aşgabat geňeşligi |
| **Aşgabat** | 3,295 | Dänew District | Aşgabat geňeşligi |
| Çandyroba | 1,677 | Dänew District | Asuda |
| Erdel | 694 | Dänew District | Asuda |
| Kiçiaryk | 619 | Dänew District | Asuda |
| Ataoba | 1,547 | Dänew District | Azatlyk geňeşligi |
| **Azatlyk** | 2,516 | Dänew District | Azatlyk geňeşligi |
| Kerpiç zawodynyň şäherjigi | 1,048 | Dänew District | Bahar |
| Agar | 1,112 | Dänew District | Baragyz geňeşligi |
| Ärsary | 987 | Dänew District | Baragyz geňeşligi |
| **Baragyz** | 1,000 | Dänew District | Baragyz geňeşligi |
| Gazakçy | 148 | Dänew District | Baragyz geňeşligi |
| **Berzeň** | 2,116 | Dänew District | Berzeň geňeşligi |
| Derýabaş | 1,571 | Dänew District | Berzeň geňeşligi |
| Garaşsyzlyk | 631 | Dänew District | Berzeň geňeşligi |
| Händeklioba | 2,293 | Dänew District | Berzeň geňeşligi |
| Jendi | 1,592 | Dänew District | Berzeň geňeşligi |
| Ulyaryk | 815 | Dänew District | Berzeň geňeşligi |
| Boýnyuzyn | 2,253 | Dänew District | Boýnyuzyn geňeşligi |
| Durmuşly | 1,100 | Dänew District | Boýnyuzyn geňeşligi |
| **Kaksaçan** | 2,631 | Dänew District | Boýnyuzyn geňeşligi |
| Kepderili | 1,876 | Dänew District | Boýnyuzyn geňeşligi |
| Traktorçy | 961 | Dänew District | Boýnyuzyn geňeşligi |
| Ýazaryk | 3,026 | Dänew District | Boýnyuzyn geňeşligi |
| Puşkin | 1,179 | Dänew District | Döwletabat geňeşligi |
| Şöhrat | 1,095 | Dänew District | Döwletabat geňeşligi |
| **Watan** | 3,515 | Dänew District | Döwletabat geňeşligi |
| Ýaşlyk | 2,472 | Dänew District | Döwletabat geňeşligi |
| Zergömen | 2,472 | Dänew District | Döwletabat geňeşligi |
| **Gabakly** | 2,617 | Dänew District | Gabakly geňeşligi |
| Gabaklyoba | 365 | Dänew District | Gabakly geňeşligi |
| Halkabat | 231 | Dänew District | Gabakly geňeşligi |
| Üçkersen | 681 | Dänew District | Gabakly geňeşligi |
| Goşaköpri | 233 | Dänew District | Göýnük geňeşligi |
| **Göýnük** | 4,102 | Dänew District | Göýnük geňeşligi |
| Kulyýewa | 2,018 | Dänew District | Göýnük geňeşligi |
| Nogaý | 369 | Dänew District | Göýnük geňeşligi |
| Şenbebazar | 3,295 | Dänew District | Göýnük geňeşligi |
| **Isbaz** | 1,892 | Dänew District | Isbaz geňeşligi |
| Täzeýurt | 733 | Dänew District | Isbaz geňeşligi |
| Araphana | 635 | Dänew District | Maý geňeşligi |
| Bilal | 1,080 | Dänew District | Maý geňeşligi |
| Dürýap | 982 | Dänew District | Maý geňeşligi |
| **Maý** | 5,236 | Dänew District | Maý geňeşligi |
| Mürzegala | 876 | Dänew District | Maý geňeşligi |
| Ýolum | 821 | Dänew District | Maý geňeşligi |
| Ak altyn | 2,186 | Dänew District | Ödeý geňeşligi |
| Belme | 601 | Dänew District | Ödeý geňeşligi |
| Çeges | 1,101 | Dänew District | Ödeý geňeşligi |
| Garagum | 1,473 | Dänew District | Ödeý geňeşligi |
| **Ödeý** | 3,626 | Dänew District | Ödeý geňeşligi |
| Dostluk | 1,777 | Dänew District | Parahat geňeşligi |
| **Parahat** | 4,258 | Dänew District | Parahat geňeşligi |
| Baýat | 1,108 | Dänew District | Ýyldyz geňeşligi |
| Gazarçy | 978 | Dänew District | Ýyldyz geňeşligi |
| Händekli | 773 | Dänew District | Ýyldyz geňeşligi |
| Sazaklyk | 981 | Dänew District | Ýyldyz geňeşligi |
| Täzegüýç | 1,243 | Dänew District | Ýyldyz geňeşligi |
| Wahym | 1,120 | Dänew District | Ýyldyz geňeşligi |
| **Ýyldyz** | 1,736 | Dänew District | Ýyldyz geňeşligi |
| **Çarwadar** | 2,760 | Darganata District | Çarwadar geňeşligi |
| Çandyr | 1,978 | Darganata District | Hojalyk geňeşligi |
| **Hojalyk** | 3,418 | Darganata District | Hojalyk geňeşligi |
| **Kyrançoba** | 4,816 | Darganata District | Lebap geňeşligi |
| Sakararyk | 2,277 | Darganata District | Lebap geňeşligi |
| Sazakly | 432 | Darganata District | Lebap |
| Ataoba | 1,292 | Darganata District | Magtymguly geňeşligi |
| **Magtymguly** | 1,057 | Darganata District | Magtymguly geňeşligi |
| **Sediwer** | 2,052 | Darganata District | Sediwer geňeşligi |
| Ak altyn | 830 | Döwletli District | Berkararlyk geňeşligi |
| **Berkararlyk** | 806 | Döwletli District | Berkararlyk geňeşligi |
| Magtymguly | 375 | Döwletli District | Berkararlyk geňeşligi |
| Çanakçy | 2,980 | Döwletli District | Burguçy geňeşligi |
| Daýhan | 1,553 | Döwletli District | Burguçy geňeşligi |
| **Hatap** | 2,234 | Döwletli District | Burguçy geňeşligi |
| Olamsurhy | 4,571 | Döwletli District | Burguçy geňeşligi |
| Bozarygoba | 1,404 | Döwletli District | Daşrabat geňeşligi |
| **Daşrabat** | 3,688 | Döwletli District | Daşrabat geňeşligi |
| Güneşli | 1,962 | Döwletli District | Daşrabat geňeşligi |
| Sarymeýdan | 1,971 | Döwletli District | Daşrabat geňeşligi |
| Ýagtylyk | 2,550 | Döwletli District | Daşrabat geňeşligi |
| Aşgabat | 630 | Döwletli District | Döwletli |
| Garagum | 426 | Döwletli District | Döwletli |
| Miras | 213 | Döwletli District | Döwletli |
| Gyzguýy | 723 | Döwletli District | Hojahaýran geňeşligi |
| Hojagürlük | 2,283 | Döwletli District | Hojahaýran geňeşligi |
| **Hojahaýran** | 1,117 | Döwletli District | Hojahaýran geňeşligi |
| Hojatutly | 932 | Döwletli District | Hojahaýran geňeşligi |
| Körkak | 1,648 | Döwletli District | Hojahaýran geňeşligi |
| Jeýhun | 652 | Döwletli District | Pagtaçy geňeşligi |
| Nowruz | 1,309 | Döwletli District | Pagtaçy geňeşligi |
| **Pagtaçy** | 1,383 | Döwletli District | Pagtaçy geňeşligi |
| Demirýolçy | 112 | Döwletli District | Tallymerjen geňeşligi |
| Sardaba | 1,726 | Döwletli District | Tallymerjen geňeşligi |
| **Tallymerjen** | 3,399 | Döwletli District | Tallymerjen geňeşligi |
| Lebap | 2,901 | Döwletli District | Täzedurmuş geňeşligi |
| **Täzedurmuş** | 1,061 | Döwletli District | Täzedurmuş geňeşligi |
| Watan | 99 | Döwletli District | Täzedurmuş geňeşligi |
| Arpasaý | 446 | Döwletli District | Türkmenistan geňeşligi |
| Dostluk | 238 | Döwletli District | Türkmenistan geňeşligi |
| Garaşsyzlyk | 215 | Döwletli District | Türkmenistan geňeşligi |
| Lebap | 544 | Döwletli District | Türkmenistan geňeşligi |
| Täzegüýç | 282 | Döwletli District | Türkmenistan geňeşligi |
| **Tutlykak** | 1,226 | Döwletli District | Türkmenistan geňeşligi |
| Ýaşlyk | 606 | Döwletli District | Türkmenistan geňeşligi |
| Ýylgynagyz | 312 | Döwletli District | Türkmenistan geňeşligi |
| Baýdak | 2,851 | Döwletli District | Ýalkym geňeşligi |
| **Surhy** | 4,676 | Döwletli District | Ýalkym geňeşligi |
| Türkmenistan | 3,890 | Döwletli District | Ýalkym geňeşligi |
| 9-njy Maý | 1,556 | Farap District | Bitik geňeşligi |
| Bahar | 392 | Farap District | Bitik geňeşligi |
| Bitik | 392 | Farap District | Bitik geňeşligi |
| Çarmerde | 2,144 | Farap District | Bitik geňeşligi |
| Gülabat | 1,685 | Farap District | Bitik geňeşligi |
| **Magtymguly** | 2,003 | Farap District | Bitik geňeşligi |
| Täzeýol | 1,440 | Farap District | Bitik geňeşligi |
| Ýeketut | 1,064 | Farap District | Bitik geňeşligi |
| Älemdar | 1,335 | Farap District | Garamyş geňeşligi |
| Bozarykly | 2,351 | Farap District | Garamyş geňeşligi |
| **Garamyş** | 1,192 | Farap District | Garamyş geňeşligi |
| Ýolbaşçy | 1,044 | Farap District | Garamyş geňeşligi |
| **Goýgala** | 3,107 | Farap District | Hanoba geňeşligi |
| Händek | 716 | Farap District | Hanoba geňeşligi |
| Parahat | 1,490 | Farap District | Hanoba geňeşligi |
| Tuýgun | 1,862 | Farap District | Hanoba geňeşligi |
| Akrabat | 992 | Farap District | Hojakenepsi geňeşligi |
| Eljik | 1,944 | Farap District | Hojakenepsi geňeşligi |
| **Hojakenepsi** | 5,181 | Farap District | Hojakenepsi geňeşligi |
| Ýylmangaýa | 909 | Farap District | Hojakenepsi geňeşligi |
| Başsaka | 616 | Farap District | Jendi geňeşligi |
| Goşaaryk | 1,134 | Farap District | Jendi geňeşligi |
| **Jendi** | 1,987 | Farap District | Jendi geňeşligi |
| Kündearyk | 918 | Farap District | Jendi geňeşligi |
| Sandykly | 1,225 | Farap District | Jendi geňeşligi |
| Ýalkym | 1,789 | Farap District | Jendi geňeşligi |
| **Kyraç** | 3,033 | Farap District | Kyraç geňeşligi |
| Mergenli | 1,214 | Farap District | Kyraç geňeşligi |
| Ýaşlyk | 459 | Farap District | Kyraç geňeşligi |
| Gadyn | 1,482 | Farap District | Osty geňeşligi |
| **Osty** | 2,555 | Farap District | Osty geňeşligi |
| **Akgala** | 2,638 | Garabekewül District | Akgala geňeşligi |
| Gutnamgala | 840 | Garabekewül District | Akgala geňeşligi |
| Hasyl | 1,065 | Garabekewül District | Akgala geňeşligi |
| Kekreli | 1,378 | Garabekewül District | Akgala geňeşligi |
| Şalyk | 837 | Garabekewül District | Akgala geňeşligi |
| Aşgaly | 1,335 | Garabekewül District | Ärsarybaba geňeşligi |
| **Haryn** | 2,559 | Garabekewül District | Ärsarybaba geňeşligi |
| Ögem | 1,523 | Garabekewül District | Ärsarybaba geňeşligi |
| **Baý** | 3,624 | Garabekewül District | Baý geňeşligi |
| Lebap | 719 | Garabekewül District | Baý geňeşligi |
| Hojagunduz | 1,022 | Garabekewül District | Baý geňeşligi |
| Şaglar | 1,350 | Garabekewül District | Baý geňeşligi |
| **Abdallar** | 231 | Garabekewül District | Dostluk geňeşligi |
| Bataşjeňňel | 520 | Garabekewül District | Dostluk geňeşligi |
| Bozaryk | 948 | Garabekewül District | Dostluk geňeşligi |
| **Çakmak** | 1,913 | Garabekewül District | Lamma geňeşligi |
| Täzeoba | 2,157 | Garabekewül District | Lamma geňeşligi |
| Garaşýer | 112 | Garabekewül District | Rahmançäge geňeşligi |
| **Rahmançäge** | 1,111 | Garabekewül District | Rahmançäge geňeşligi |
| Akdepe | 645 | Garabekewül District | Seýdi geňeşligi |
| Bürgüt | 1,113 | Garabekewül District | Seýdi geňeşligi |
| Garaltaý | 1,005 | Garabekewül District | Seýdi geňeşligi |
| Saltyk | 1,207 | Garabekewül District | Seýdi geňeşligi |
| **Seýdi** | 2,351 | Garabekewül District | Seýdi geňeşligi |
| Şorly | 776 | Garabekewül District | Seýdi geňeşligi |
| **Soltanýazgala** | 3,547 | Garabekewül District | Soltanýazgala geňeşligi |
| Gumakly | 639 | Garabekewül District | Yslam |
| Soltanjeňňel | 336 | Garabekewül District | Yslam |
| Gökdepe | 1,096 | Garabekewül District | Zelili adyndaky geňeşlik |
| Arygaýak | 3,348 | Halaç District | Altyn asyr geňeşligi |
| Baýhalky | 3,225 | Halaç District | Altyn asyr geňeşligi |
| Çilan | 3,271 | Halaç District | Altyn asyr geňeşligi |
| **Kazyaryk** | 1,520 | Halaç District | Altyn asyr geňeşligi |
| Mäşpaýa | 4,073 | Halaç District | Altyn asyr geňeşligi |
| Pesti | 3,010 | Halaç District | Altyn asyr geňeşligi |
| Bagşyly | 4,553 | Halaç District | Çohpetde |
| Jeňňel | 1,261 | Halaç District | Çohpetde |
| Okçandyr | 4,077 | Halaç District | Çohpetde |
| Täzemekan | 875 | Halaç District | Çohpetde |
| Akýap | 2,726 | Halaç District | Esenmeňli geňeşligi |
| **Esenmeňli** | 7,969 | Halaç District | Esenmeňli geňeşligi |
| Magtymguly | 5,387 | Halaç District | Esenmeňli geňeşligi |
| Zynhary | 2,311 | Halaç District | Esenmeňli geňeşligi |
| **Güneşlik** | 2,057 | Halaç District | Güneşlik geňeşligi |
| Azatlyk | 3,107 | Halaç District | Güýçbirleşik geňeşligi |
| **Güýçbirleşik** | 5,640 | Halaç District | Güýçbirleşik geňeşligi |
| **Ajy** | 4,220 | Halaç District | Halaç geňeşligi |
| Azady | 3,286 | Halaç District | Halaç geňeşligi |
| Babadaýhan | 4,297 | Halaç District | Halaç geňeşligi |
| Garagaç | 3,828 | Halaç District | Halaç geňeşligi |
| Jeýhun | 766 | Halaç District | Halaç geňeşligi |
| **Etbaş** | 2,551 | Halaç District | Oguz han geňeşligi |
| Maňgyşlaly | 2,749 | Halaç District | Oguz han geňeşligi |
| Müsür | 939 | Halaç District | Oguz han geňeşligi |
| Gülegenje | 2,993 | Halaç District | Pelwert geňeşligi |
| **Pelwert** | 5,580 | Halaç District | Pelwert geňeşligi |
| Reýimberdili | 3,542 | Halaç District | Pelwert geňeşligi |
| Omargyzylja | 4,673 | Halaç District | Surh geňeşligi |
| **Surh** | 6,013 | Halaç District | Surh geňeşligi |
| Täzemaksat | 1,781 | Halaç District | Surh geňeşligi |
| Boraşly | 3,940 | Hojambaz District | Beşir |
| Gabyrdy | 3,855 | Hojambaz District | Beşir |
| Garaja | 1,444 | Hojambaz District | Beşir |
| Güneş | 2,596 | Hojambaz District | Beşir |
| Ýokarkyşor | 1,884 | Hojambaz District | Beşir |
| Baýat | 2,544 | Hojambaz District | Burdalyk geňeşligi |
| **Burdalyk** | 4,558 | Hojambaz District | Burdalyk geňeşligi |
| Babadaýhan | 639 | Hojambaz District | Galkynyş geňeşligi* |
| Eleç | 3,512 | Hojambaz District | Galkynyş geňeşligi* |
| Tölekguýy | 1,530 | Hojambaz District | Galkynyş geňeşligi* |
| Ýaşlyk | 1,530 | Hojambaz District | Galkynyş geňeşligi* |
| Bekewül | 893 | Hojambaz District | Gultak geňeşligi |
| Buýankökçi | 272 | Hojambaz District | Gultak geňeşligi |
| **Gultak** | 3,709 | Hojambaz District | Gultak geňeşligi |
| Isamly | 1,214 | Hojambaz District | Gultak geňeşligi |
| Ýabanyoba | 601 | Hojambaz District | Gultak geňeşligi |
| **Çalyşlar** | 2,729 | Hojambaz District | Gyzylgum geňeşligi |
| Çekiç | 2,924 | Hojambaz District | Gyzylgum geňeşligi |
| Gazanaryk | 2,204 | Hojambaz District | Gyzylgum geňeşligi |
| Egriýagyr | 1,314 | Hojambaz District | Kyrköýli geňeşligi |
| Gülüstan | 749 | Hojambaz District | Kyrköýli geňeşligi |
| **Kyrköýli** | 4,373 | Hojambaz District | Kyrköýli geňeşligi |
| Abdal | 1,260 | Hojambaz District | Mekan geňeşligi |
| Altynkök | 465 | Hojambaz District | Mekan geňeşligi |
| Dänajy | 1,107 | Hojambaz District | Mekan geňeşligi |
| **Mekan** | 2,524 | Hojambaz District | Mekan geňeşligi |
| Müsür | 1,454 | Hojambaz District | Mekan geňeşligi |
| **Sabynly** | 3,962 | Hojambaz District | Surhy geňeşligi |
| Surhy | 2,529 | Hojambaz District | Surhy geňeşligi |
| Botaýer | 5,468 | Kerki District | Astanababa |
| Gabşal | 8,121 | Kerki District | Astanababa |
| Sopyýer | 931 | Kerki District | Astanababa |
| Könebaşsaka | 1,736 | Kerki District | Başsaka |
| **Çekir** | 8,155 | Kerki District | Çekir geňeşligi |
| Etbaşoba | 644 | Kerki District | Çekir geňeşligi |
| Gabasakgal | 8,666 | Kerki District | Çekir geňeşligi |
| Garaja | 3,987 | Kerki District | Çekir geňeşligi |
| Güýç | 5,196 | Kerki District | Çekir geňeşligi |
| Jeňňel | 1,974 | Kerki District | Çekir geňeşligi |
| Daşlyk | 3,327 | Kerki District | Daşlyk geňeşligi |
| **Lebap** | 3,001 | Kerki District | Daşlyk geňeşligi |
| Tokaýçylar | 624 | Kerki District | Daşlyk geňeşligi |
| Ussalar | 4,717 | Kerki District | Daşlyk geňeşligi |
| Niçge | 854 | Kerki District | Garamätnyýaz |
| Gülüstan | 203 | Kerki District | Garaşsyzlygyň 15 ýyllygy |
| Güneşoba | 877 | Kerki District | Guwak geňeşligi |
| **Guwak** | 4,534 | Kerki District | Guwak geňeşligi |
| Mukryoba | 2,455 | Kerki District | Guwak geňeşligi |
| Mürzebeg | 2,199 | Kerki District | Guwak geňeşligi |
| Bazarjaý | 377 | Kerki District | Gyzylaýak geňeşligi |
| Parahat | 551 | Kerki District | Gyzylaýak geňeşligi |
| Gyzylaýak | 5,293 | Kerki District | Gyzylaýak geňeşligi |
| Çömmeklihatap | 880 | Kerki District | Hatap geňeşligi |
| Galaly | 1,781 | Kerki District | Hatap geňeşligi |
| Galalyaryk | 1,486 | Kerki District | Hatap geňeşligi |
| **Hatap** | 829 | Kerki District | Hatap geňeşligi |
| Jeňňellihatap | 1,202 | Kerki District | Hatap geňeşligi |
| Mukryaryk | 1,599 | Kerki District | Hatap geňeşligi |
| **Akgumolam** | 5,977 | Köýtendag District | Akgumolam geňeşligi |
| Aýrybaba | 662 | Köýtendag District | Çärjew geňeşligi |
| **Çärjew** | 1,311 | Köýtendag District | Çärjew geňeşligi |
| Ýürekdepe | 399 | Köýtendag District | Çärjew geňeşligi |
| **Garahowuz** | 3,128 | Köýtendag District | Garahowuz geňeşligi |
| Garlyk (village) | 879 | Köýtendag District | Garlyk |
| Hojak | 144 | Köýtendag District | Garlyk |
| Künjek | 735 | Köýtendag District | Garlyk |
| Balh | 2,111 | Köýtendag District | Garnas geňeşligi |
| **Çarşaňňy** | 2,601 | Köýtendag District | Garnas geňeşligi |
| Garabagşyly | 2,810 | Köýtendag District | Garnas geňeşligi |
| Garnas | 1,804 | Köýtendag District | Garnas geňeşligi |
| **Garrygala** | 614 | Köýtendag District | Garrygala geňeşligi |
| Gökmiýar | 718 | Köýtendag District | Garrygala geňeşligi |
| Mes | 163 | Köýtendag District | Kelif |
| Bazardepe | 698 | Köýtendag District | Köýten geňeşligi |
| Gyzylaý | 1,000 | Köýtendag District | Köýten geňeşligi |
| Hojeýpil | 1,047 | Köýtendag District | Köýten geňeşligi |
| **Köýten** | 3,535 | Köýtendag District | Köýten geňeşligi |
| Leýlimekan | 932 | Köýtendag District | Köýten geňeşligi |
| Täzeçarwa | 728 | Köýtendag District | Köýten geňeşligi |
| Akderi | 1,264 | Köýtendag District | Megejik geňeşligi |
| Gumpetde | 2,127 | Köýtendag District | Megejik geňeşligi |
| **Megejik** | 3,457 | Köýtendag District | Megejik geňeşligi |
| Şagundy | 752 | Köýtendag District | Megejik geňeşligi |
| **Ters** | 3,618 | Köýtendag District | Ters geňeşligi |
| **Zarpçy** | 1,297 | Köýtendag District | Zarpçy geňeşligi |
| **Awçy** | 3,181 | Saýat District | Awçy geňeşligi |
| Lebapoba | 3,258 | Saýat District | Awçy geňeşligi |
| Nerezim | 1,032 | Saýat District | Awçy geňeşligi |
| Nurbak | 1,333 | Saýat District | Awçy geňeşligi |
| **Bakjaçylar** | 2,767 | Saýat District | Bakjaçy geňeşligi |
| Görelde | 1,830 | Saýat District | Çaltut |
| Gyzylýarymaý | 790 | Saýat District | Çarbagdepe geňeşligi |
| Miweçiler | 1,000 | Saýat District | Çarbagdepe geňeşligi |
| **Tejribeçiler** | 1,761 | Saýat District | Çarbagdepe geňeşligi |
| Azatlyk | 957 | Saýat District | Çekiç geňeşligi |
| Bagtyýarlyk | 1,440 | Saýat District | Çekiç geňeşligi |
| **Çekiçler** | 2,000 | Saýat District | Çekiç geňeşligi |
| **Çowdur** | 3,208 | Saýat District | Çowdur geňeşligi |
| Garagum | 2,243 | Saýat District | Çowdur geňeşligi |
| Saýatly | 2,115 | Saýat District | Çowdur geňeşligi |
| Watan | 1,630 | Saýat District | Çowdur geňeşligi |
| Esli | 2,542 | Saýat District | Esgi geňeşligi |
| **Gyzylgaýa** | 4,278 | Saýat District | Esgi geňeşligi |
| Ýagtyýol | 1,793 | Saýat District | Esgi geňeşligi |
| Ak altyn | 1,357 | Saýat District | Garamahmyt geňeşligi |
| **Babadaýhan** | 2,140 | Saýat District | Garamahmyt geňeşligi |
| **Alpanoba** | 1,235 | Saýat District | Hojainebeg geňeşligi |
| Täzeýol | 1,329 | Saýat District | Hojainebeg geňeşligi |
| **Bereketli** | 3,006 | Saýat District | Jeňňel geňeşligi |
| Gulançy | 1,348 | Saýat District | Jeňňel geňeşligi |
| Gutjuly | 763 | Saýat District | Jeňňel geňeşligi |
| Raýdaşlyk | 1,190 | Saýat District | Jeňňel geňeşligi |
| Ýaşlyk | 1,126 | Saýat District | Jeňňel geňeşligi |
| Gawunçy | 600 | Saýat District | Lebaby geňeşligi |
| Guşçy | 945 | Saýat District | Lebaby geňeşligi |
| Kelteýap | 1,180 | Saýat District | Lebaby geňeşligi |
| **Lebaby** | 2,147 | Saýat District | Lebaby geňeşligi |
| Alpan | 2,002 | Saýat District | Merýe geňeşligi |
| **Goşdepe** | 2,940 | Saýat District | Merýe geňeşligi |
| Hazarekdepe | 2,208 | Saýat District | Merýe geňeşligi |
| Bitaraplyk | 1,310 | Saýat District | Mülk geňeşligi |
| Bujak | 2,053 | Saýat District | Mülk geňeşligi |
| Garkyn | 1,850 | Saýat District | Mülk geňeşligi |
| Guşçulyk | 369 | Saýat District | Mülk geňeşligi |
| Gyzan | 3,791 | Saýat District | Mülk geňeşligi |
| **Mülk** | 1,647 | Saýat District | Mülk geňeşligi |
| Dostluk | 2,133 | Saýat District | Syýadagsakar geňeşligi |
| Hasylçy | 1,404 | Saýat District | Syýadagsakar geňeşligi |
| **Syýadagsakar** | 2,890 | Saýat District | Syýadagsakar geňeşligi |
| **Täzelikçi** | 1,605 | Saýat District | Täzelikçi geňeşligi |
| **Topurkak** | 818 | Saýat District | Topurkak geňeşligi |
| **Ýeňiş** | 2,535 | Saýat District | Ýeňiş geňeşligi |

- Galkynyş Rural Council, Hojambaz District, has its administrative center in Hojambaz City.

== Former settlements ==
This list is sorted by alphabetical order only.

| Name | Type | Included in | End date | Current status |
|---|---|---|---|---|
| Gyrteki | Village | Osty geňeşligi | 19 September 2025 | |
| Hojaşüllük | Village | Garrygala geňeşligi | 19 September 2025 | |
| Mälik | Village | Köýten geňeşligi | 19 September 2025 | |

== See also ==
- Demographics of Turkmenistan
- Cities of Turkmenistan
- Towns of Turkmenistan
- List of cities, towns and villages in Turkmenistan
