= Hatap, Kerki =

Hatap Hatap obasy
- Village
- Location in Turkmenistan
- Coordinates: 37.62919°N 65.52628°E
- Country: Turkmenistan
- Province: Lebap Province
- District: Köýtendag District
- Rural Council: Burguçy geňeşligi
- Elevation: 241 m (791 ft)

Population (2022 official census)
  - Total: 829
- Time zone: UTC+5

Hatap, or Hatab, is a village in Kerki District, Lebap Province, Turkmenistan, near the border with Afghanistan. It is located on the left bank of the Amu Darya River, circa 20 km west of the border, and circa 35 km southeast of the Kerki. In 2022, it had reportedly a population of 829 people.

Just like many rural settlements in Turkmenistan, its economy is primarily geared towards agriculture, including cotton.

== Rural Council ==
Hatap is the seat of a rural council including six villages:

- Hatap, village
- Çömmeklihatap, village
- Galaly, village
- Galalyaryk, village
- Jeňňellihatap, village
- Mukryaryk, village

== See also ==
- List of cities, towns and villages in Turkmenistan
- List of municipalities in Lebap Province
