= Isbaz, Dänew =

Village in Turkmenistan

Isbaz Isbaz obasy
- Village
- Location in Turkmenistan
- Coordinates: 39°33′28″N 62°54′15″E
- Country: Turkmenistan
- Province: Lebap Province
- District: Dänew District
- Rural council: Isbaz geňeşligi

Population (2022 official census)
  - Total: 1,892
- Time zone: UTC+5

Isbaz, sometimes spelled as Ispaz (in Russian: Испаз), is a village in Dänew District, Lebap Province, Turkmenistan. It is located on the left bank of the Amu Darya River, 8 km north of Seýdi and about 40 km northwest of Dänew. In 2022, it had a population of 1,892 people.

On 25 November 2017, as Seýdi's status was changed from "city with district status" to "city in a district," Isbaz Rural Council jurisdiction was transferred from Seýdi to Dänew District.

Isbaz is the seat of a rural council including of two villages:

- Isbaz, village
- Täzeýurt, village

== See also ==
- List of municipalities in Lebap Province
