= Çärjew =

Çärjew Çärjew şäherçesi
- Town
- Location in Turkmenistan
- Coordinates: 39°05′31″N 63°29′37″E
- Country: Turkmenistan
- Province: Lebap Province
- District: Çärjew District

Population (2022 official census)
  - Town: 10,242
  - Urban: 1,825
  - Rural: 8,417
- Time zone: UTC+5

Çärjew, formerly known as Guşçular or Ptitsesovkhoz (in Russian: "Птицесовхоз"), is a town and capital of Çärjew District, Lebap Province, Turkmenistan. The town is located nearly 5 km west of Türkmenabat. In 2022, it had a population of 1,825 people.

== Etymology ==
Çärjew is a Turkmen borrowing from the Persian chahârjuy (چهارجوى), meaning "four streams".

Its former name, Ptitsesovkhoz, refers to a sovkhoz, a state-managed farm, specialized in poultry breeding. Its next name, Guşçular, is inherited from the Soviet-Russian name; "Guşçu" refers to a "poultry breeder," and the suffix "-lar" is the mark of the plural.

== History ==
On 10 May 2010, the administrative center of Serdarabat District was moved to the village of Guşçular. On 25 November 2017, the village was granted township and renamed to Çärjew.

== Dependencies ==
Çärjew includes six dependent rural villages:

- Çärjew, town
  - Darganly, village
  - Garawul, village
  - Marküş, village
  - Orazaly, village
  - Ulywahym, village
  - Ýaňyaryk, village

== See also ==
- List of municipalities in Lebap Province
- Towns of Turkmenistan
