= Garaşsyzlyk =

Garaşsyzlyk Garaşsyzlyk şäherçesi
- Town
- Location in Turkmenistan
- Coordinates: 39°13′22″N 63°19′11″E
- Country: Turkmenistan
- Province: Lebap Province
- District: Dänew District

Population (2022 official census)
  - Total: 7,136
- Time zone: UTC+5

Garaşsyzlyk, formerly known as Moskovsk (in Russian: "Московск") then Nyýazow, is a town in Dänew District, Lebap Province, Turkmenistan. Several toponyms use the same name in Turkmenistan. In 2022, Garaşsyzlyk had a population of 7,136 people.

== Etymology ==
The Turkmen language is a very agglutinative language which, along with other Turkic languages, uses a lot of suffixes. Thus, the name Garaşsyzlyk is a succession of a word and two suffixes. "Garaş" could be translated as "Relation," "-syz" is a suffix meaning "Without" or "No," "With no relation," and the suffix "-lyk" could be translated as the suffix "-ness." Consequently, the whole word "Garaşsyzlyk" translates as "Independence."

== History ==
Moskovsk was initially the administrative center of Boýnyuzyn Raion. On 9 March 1993, the town was renamed Nyýazow in reference to President Saparmyrat Nyýazow.

On 25 November 2017, the town was renamed Garaşsyzlyk.

== See also ==
- List of municipalities in Lebap Province
- Towns of Turkmenistan
