= Astana Baba Mausoleum =

Astana Baba is the name of two eponymous mausoleums, both in Central Asia:

- Ak Astana-Baba in Sariosiyo District, Uzbekistan
- Astana Baba in Lebap Province, Turkmenistan
