= Dayahatyn =

Medieval caravanserai in Lebap velayat, Turkmenistan

Dayahatyn Caravanserai
- Dayakhatyn, Daya-khatyn, Bai khatyn
- Interactive map of Dayahatyn Caravanserai
- 40.074570°N 62.398800°E
- Location: Turkmenistan
- Region: Lebap

History
- Built: 9th century and transformed in the 11th to 12th centuries
- Abandoned: 16th century

Site notes
- Material: Adobe bricks and burnt bricks
- Length: 53 m (174 ft)
- Width: 53 m (174 ft)
- Condition: under restoration
- Public access: yes

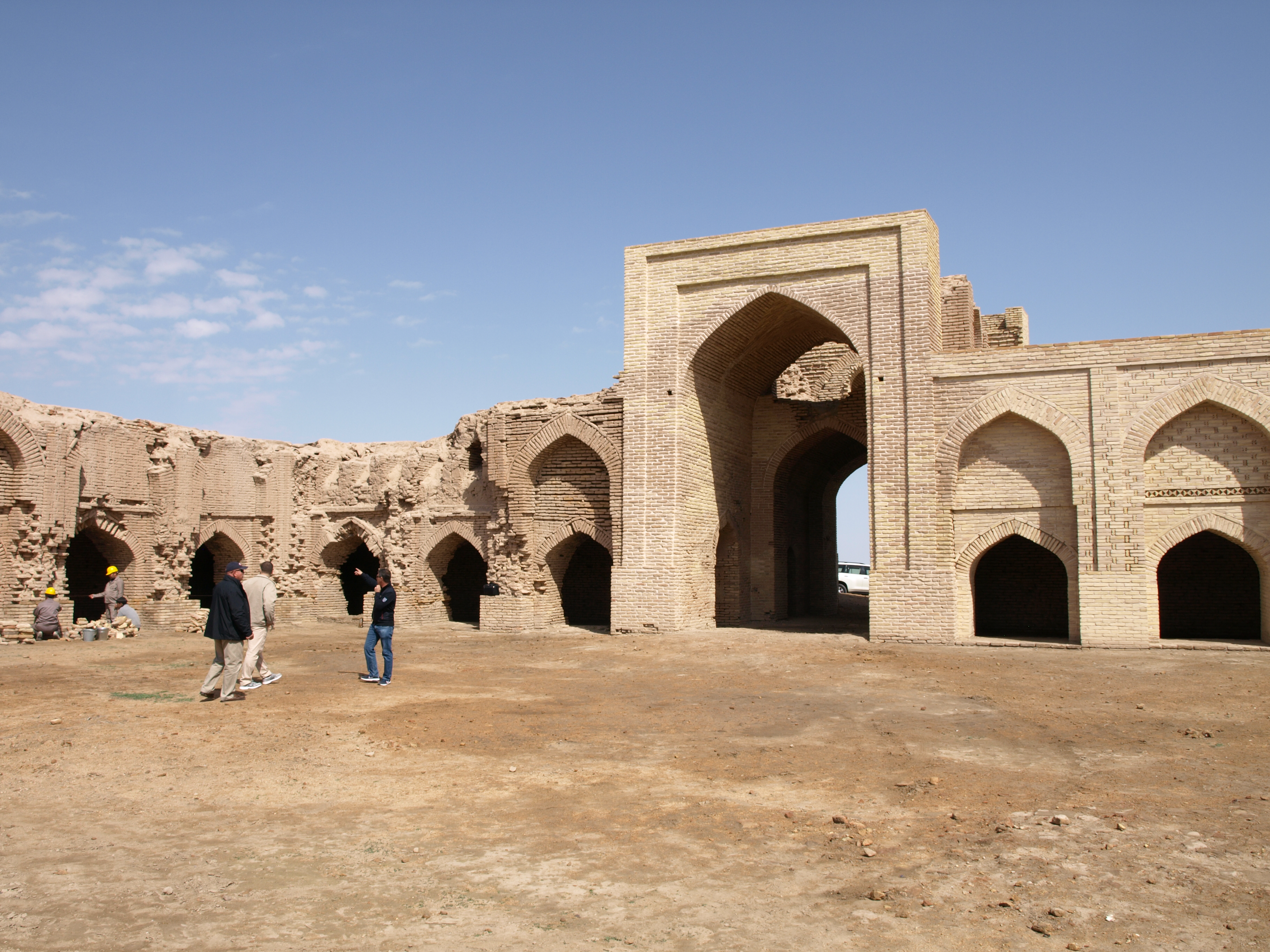
View from the courtyard of the main entrance of the Dayahatyn caravanserai, March 2018

Daýahatyn (Turkmen pronunciation: [dɑːˌjɑχɑːˈtɯn]), also spelled Dayakhatun (Persian: دایه‌خاتون), is a medieval caravanserai, sitting on the left bank of the Amu Darya. It is around 170 kilometres (110 mi) to the northwest of Turkmenabat, near the Turkmenistan–Uzbekistan border. Daýahatyn is a fortified square enclosure with sides 53 metres (174 ft) long. It is believed to have been originally a fortress built by Tahir ibn Husayn in the 9th century. In the 11th century, it was transformed into a caravanserai with fascinating brick-structures, providing shelter for not only caravans but also elites during their long journeys. The integrity of Daýahatyn is a typical example of the mastery of Seljuk architects in brickwork during the 11th and 12th centuries. Because of its artistic excellence, Daýahatyn is regarded as one of the most valuable examples, and perhaps the finest example, of a caravanserai extant in Central Asia, aside from that of Ribat of Sharaf.

== History ==
=== Folklore ===
Several legends relate the construction of Dayahatyn. One is that the Rabat of Dayahatyn was built by a local ruler, who wished to hide from a beauty named Daya. Another version is about a rich man named Bay, who suspected his wife in infidelity and left home in the cloth of poor dervish. His wife Bay-Hatyn waited for him to return for many years. In order to ease his suspicion, she built the beautiful Dayahatyn to demonstrate her love and fidelity to her husband. After years of wandering, Bay finally returned to his homeland as a worker in the caravanserai construction. Bay-Hatyn recognized him and they lived happily ever after.

== Conservation ==
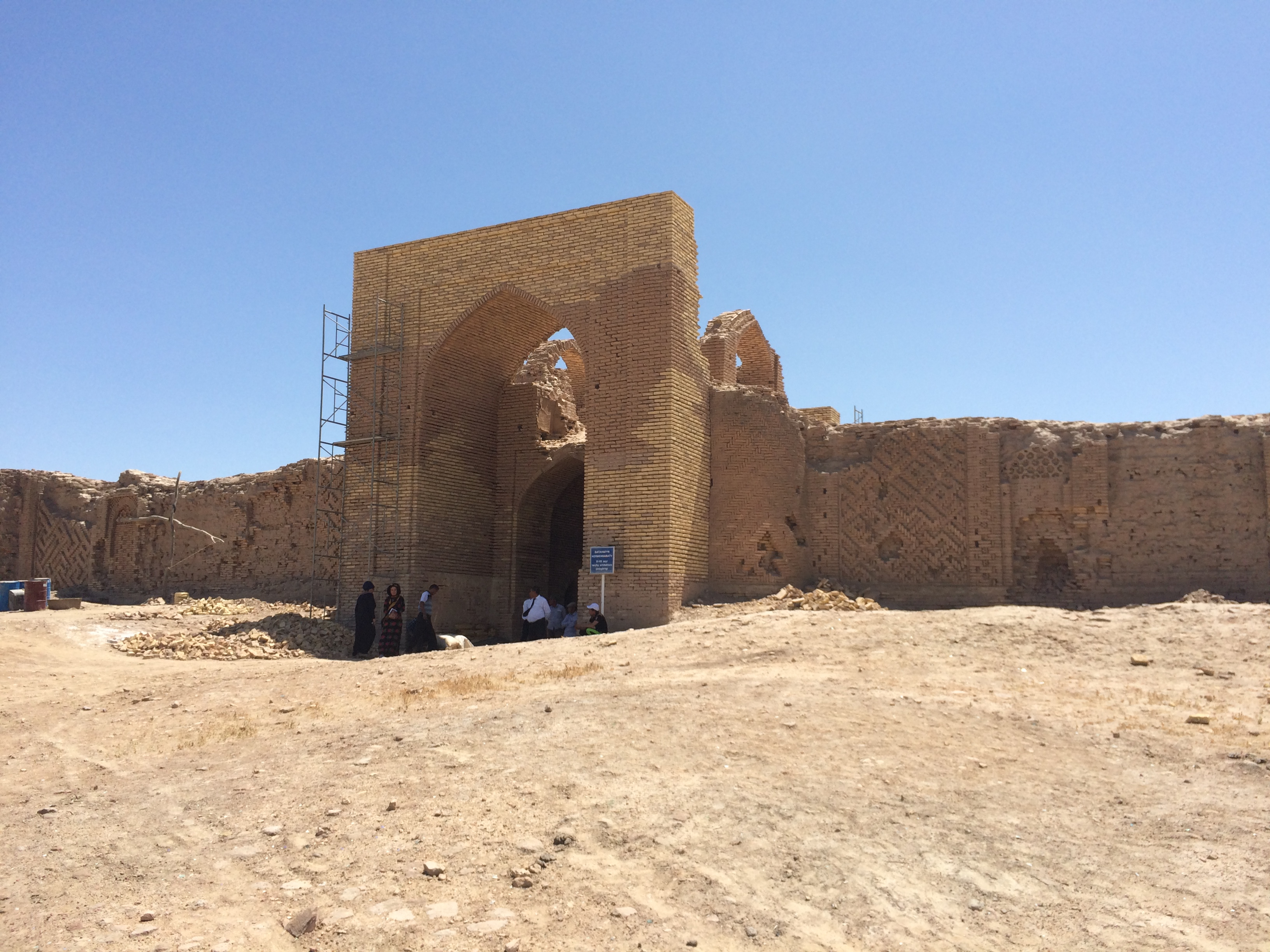
Partially restored main gate of the Dayahatyn Caravansaray as of June 2015.

The site has been recommended by the Government of Turkmenistan for inclusion in the UNESCO World Heritage List. In 2012, Dayahatyn was awarded a conservation grant from the Ambassadors Fund for Cultural Preservation by the U.S. Government; the National Administration for Protection, Research and Restoration of Historical and Cultural Monuments of Turkmenistan undertook the responsibilities.

== Tourism ==
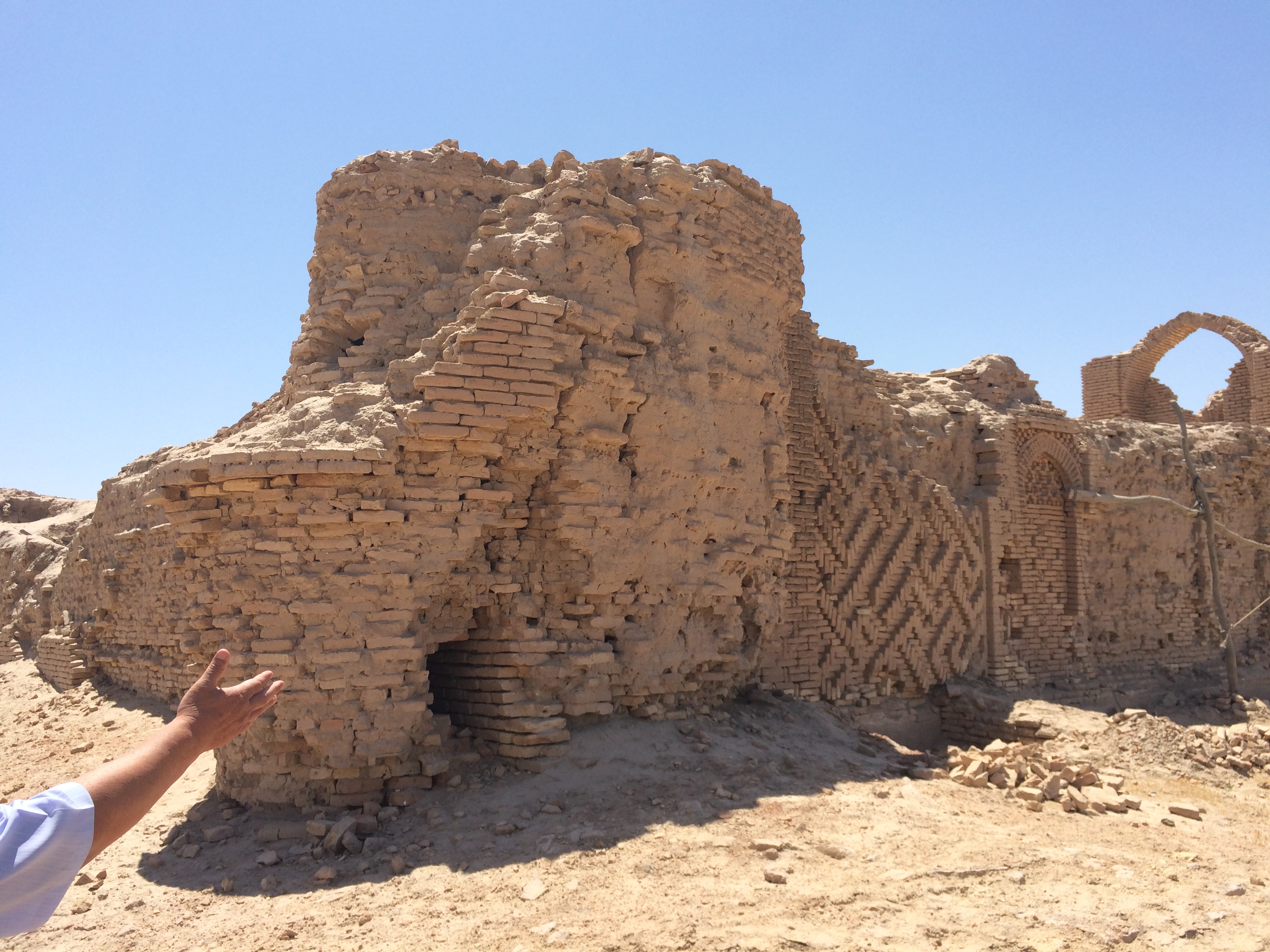
Tower and wall of the Dayahatyn caravansaray.

As Dayahatyn is located far from common tourist routes and movements of foreign visitors are still monitored by an extremely authoritarian government, tourism development conditions of Dayahatyn are not very favourable. Very few tourists are able visit, although since 2018 the caravansarai is no longer behind the border fence. In order to develop tourism, the Dayahatyn caravanserai is included in the Programme for Tourism Industry Development in Turkmenistan in 2012–2016. Within this programme, improvement of tourism development in Dayahatyn could be carried out in the near future.

== See also ==
- Caravanserai
- Rabati Malik
