= Seýdi =

Seýdi Seýdi şäheri
- City
- Location within Turkmenistan
- Coordinates: 39.48126°N 62.91577°E
- Country: Turkmenistan
- Province: Lebap Province
- District: Dänew District
- Established: 1973

Population (2022 official census)
  - Total: 29,670
- Time zone: UTC+5
- Postal code: 746222
- Area code: (+993-446)

Seýdi, formerly known as Neftezavodsk (in Russian: Нефтезаводск), is a city in Dänew District, Lebap Province, Turkmenistan. The city is located on the left bank of the Amu Darya River, circa 35 km northwest of Dänew. The country's second largest oil refinery is located in Seýdi. In 2022, it had reportedly a population of 29,670 people.

== Etymology ==
The city was named Neftezavodsk from 1973 until 1990. It derives from two Russian words: "neft," (нефть) which means "oil," and "zavod," (завод) which means "factory."

The city was then renamed Seýdi, which refers to Seýitnazar Seýdi, a Turkmen poet and warrior.

== History ==
The city was founded in 1973 along with the oil refinery; according to Russian census data, it was categorized as a "town of urban type". On 23 August 1990, it was upgraded to city, and renamed Seýdi in honor of Turkmen poet Seýitnazar Seýdi.

On 25 November 2017, Seýdi was downgraded from a city with "district status" to a city "in a district", subordinate to Dänew District. All rural settlements under its jurisdiction, included in Gabakly and Isbaz Rural Councils, were transferred to the same district.

== Geography ==
Seýdi lies on the edge of the Transuguz Desert, 70 kilometers NW of Türkmenabat on the left bank of the Amu Darya. The city houses the headquarters of the Amudarya State Nature Reserve, including a museum.

== Economy ==
The lifeline of the city remains the Seýdi refinery, which was built during the late Soviet period to process oil, piped from Siberia; it remains one of Turkmenistan's only two oil refineries. Since the collapse of Soviet Union, the Seýdi refinery has been reintegrated with the Kokdumalak, Ýaşyldepe, Ýolöten, and Kerwen oil-fields. The unit processed about half a million tonnes of oil in 2020; among the products were gasoline, asphalt, and diesel.

== See also ==
- Cities of Turkmenistan
- List of municipalities in Lebap Province
