= Ashgabat–Turkmenabat Motorway =

Expressway located in Turkmenistan

- Aşgabat–Türkmenabat ýokary tizlikli awtomobil ýoly
- Ashgabat–Turkmenabat Autobahn

Route information
- Maintained by Türkmenawtoban Closed Joint Stock Company
- Length: 600 mi (970 km)
- Existed: c. 2021–present

Major junctions
- Ashgabat end: Tejen
- Mary end: Turkmenabat

Location
- Country: Turkmenistan
- States: Ahal Region, Mary Region, Lebap Region

Highway system
- Transport in Turkmenistan

The Ashgabat–Turkmenabat Motorway (Turkmen: Aşgabat–Türkmenabat ýokary tizlikli awtomobil ýoly) is a high-speed motorway in Turkmenistan that connects the country's capital, Ashgabat, with the city of Turkmenabat. The total length of the motorway is 600 kilometers. The motorway goes through the cities of Ashgabat and Mary, spanning across the Ahal, Mary, and Lebap regions.

The motorway was completed in April 2026, and all sections of the highway were open to traffic.

== History ==
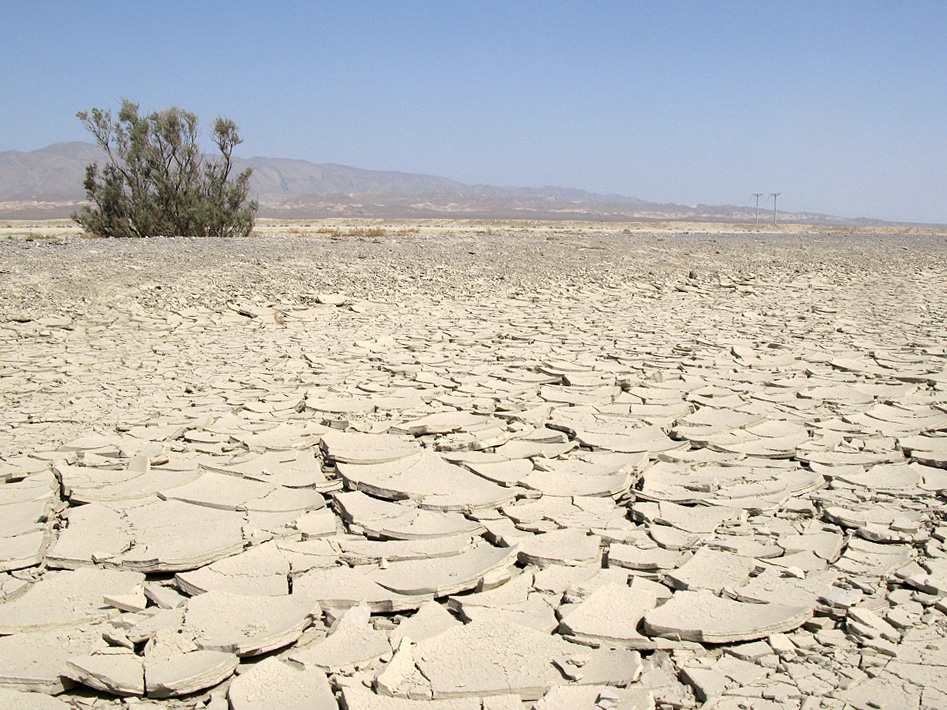
The highway passes north through the Karakum Desert

Closed joint-stock company Türkmenawtoban was established to construct the high-speed motorway Ashgabat–Turkmenabat. The company is formed from entrepreneurial structures that are members of the Union of Industrialists and Entrepreneurs of Turkmenistan. VCE Vienna Consulting Engineers ZT GmbH (Austria) was contracted by Türkmenawtoban CJSC in 2019 to oversee the quality control of the Ashgabat–Turkmenabat motorway project.

Construction of the motorway began on January 24, 2019, and is being implemented in three phases: Ashgabat–Tejen (203 km), Tejen–Mary (109 km), and Mary–Turkmenabat (288 km). The total cost of the project is $2.4 billion USD.

The first section of the motorway, Ashgabat–Tejen, spanning 203 kilometers, was opened for traffic in October 2021.

The second section, Tejen–Mary, with a length of 109 kilometers, was inaugurated in April 2024. The motorway has achieved ISO 9001 certification.

On April 10, 2026, the 288-kilometer Mary–Turkmenabat section was officially opened.

Construction of the Ashgabat–Turkmenabat motorway is being managed by the Closed Joint Stock Company Türkmenawtoban. Subcontractors include individual enterprises such as Nusaýýollary and Hyzmat Merkezi, along with joint-stock companies Edermen and Altyn Nesil, which are responsible for various construction stages and the development of essential infrastructure along the motorway.

== Description ==
The motorway consists of six traffic lanes and additional emergency lanes. The width of the road surface is 34.5 meters, with each side of the carriageway measuring 11.25 meters. The movement zones are 3.75 meters wide. Each direction includes an emergency lane, a ditch, and metal barriers to prevent animals and people from entering the motorway.

The road surface is made of high-quality asphalt concrete and modern materials, enhancing the strength and load-bearing capacity of the motorway. The road construction includes a 60 cm layer of stone covering, followed by layers of 20 cm each. Additionally, three layers of 22 cm asphalt were laid for the highway.

Facilities such as parking lots, rest areas, shops, cafes, fuel stations, and other infrastructure have been established along the motorway for the convenience of drivers and passengers.

The highway infrastructure includes several traffic police posts equipped with surveillance cameras, technical maintenance stations, and road service facilities. A dedicated traffic management system collects data from surveillance cameras and meteorological stations and transmits it to road monitoring services.

During construction, measures were taken to minimize environmental impact, including roadside landscaping and initiatives to protect local ecosystems. The motorway includes 69 structures, such as bridges, tunnels, and overpasses. These include hydrotechnical facilities, wildlife tunnels, agricultural machinery crossings, and engineering communication systems.

Special telephone stations are located along the road, connected to the control center for emergency calls and assistance.

== Importance ==
The Ashgabat–Turkmenabat Motorway is one of the largest infrastructure projects in Turkmenistan. It provides access for automobile cargo flows to highways leading to the Asia-Pacific region and serves as a high-speed transport artery for the efficient and cost-effective transportation of goods over long distances.

== Mobile network coverage ==
Since 2026, Turkmen operator Altyn Asyr covers the route with LTE connectivity.

== See also ==
- M37 highway
