= Garabekewül District =

Garabekewül District (abolished) Garabekewül etraby 1992-2017 Karabekaul etraby 1925-1992
- District
- Garabekewül etraby
- Interactive map of Garabekewül District (abolished)
- Country: Turkmenistan
- Province: Lebap Province
- Capital: Garabekewül
- Time zone: UTC+5 (+5)

Garabekewül District is a former district of Lebap Province in Turkmenistan. The administrative center of the district was the town of Garabekewül. It is now part of Halaç District, which annexed it on 25 November 2017 by Parliamentary Resolution No. 679-V.

== History ==
It was formed in February 1925 as Karabekaul etrap (District) of Leninsk oblast', Turkmen SSR. In May 1927, Leninsk oblast' was renamed to Chardzhou oblast'. In September 1930, when Chardzhou oblast' was abolished, Karabekaul District was directly subordinated to the Turkmen SSR. In November 1939, Karabekaul District moved back to the newly reformed Chardzhou oblast'. In January 1963, Karabekaul was abolished, but it was restored in direct submission to the Turkmen SSR government in December 1964. In December 1970, the district rejoined the restored Chardzhou oblast'.

Following independence, on December 14, 1992, Karabekaul District became part of Lebap Province (with identical borders to the old Chardzhou Oblast) and was renamed Garabekewül.

On November 25, 2017, the Parliament of Turkmenistan eliminated Garabekewül District, transferring its territory to Halaç District.

== Berkarar Zaman ==
Berkarar Zaman Berkarar Zaman
- Location within Turkmenistan
- Coordinates: 38°17′45″N 64°21′42″E
- Country: Turkmenistan
- Region: Lebap
- District: Garabekewül District

Population (2021)
  - Total: 0

In 2016, this district saw the grand opening of a new village called Berkarar Zaman, which translates to "the epoch of accomplishment." The village itself was dedicated by President Gurbanguly Berdimuhamedow. The Turkmens saw on TV spacious homes, good roads, and utilities. The village was full of celebrations, the roads were lined with people, and the markets were full of goods on the day of the opening. To promote this village, authorities used phrases such as "new model Turkmen village," "new living standards," "innovations," "reform programs," and "village regeneration" to attract newcomers. However, days later, after the president left and the "residents" went home, the village was deserted and workers erased the town's sign. Electricity and roads have been provided, but only in the places visited by Berdimuhamedow. Opposition media cited phrases "new model Turkmen village," "new living standards," "innovations," "reform programs," and "village regeneration" as "fine words and catchy phrases in the local media that reveal the authorities’ total disconnection from reality, from the real conditions of daily life." RFE/RL claimed that Berkarar Zaman is actually a Potemkin village for Berdimuhamedow.
