= Garabekewül =

Garabekewül Карабекаул
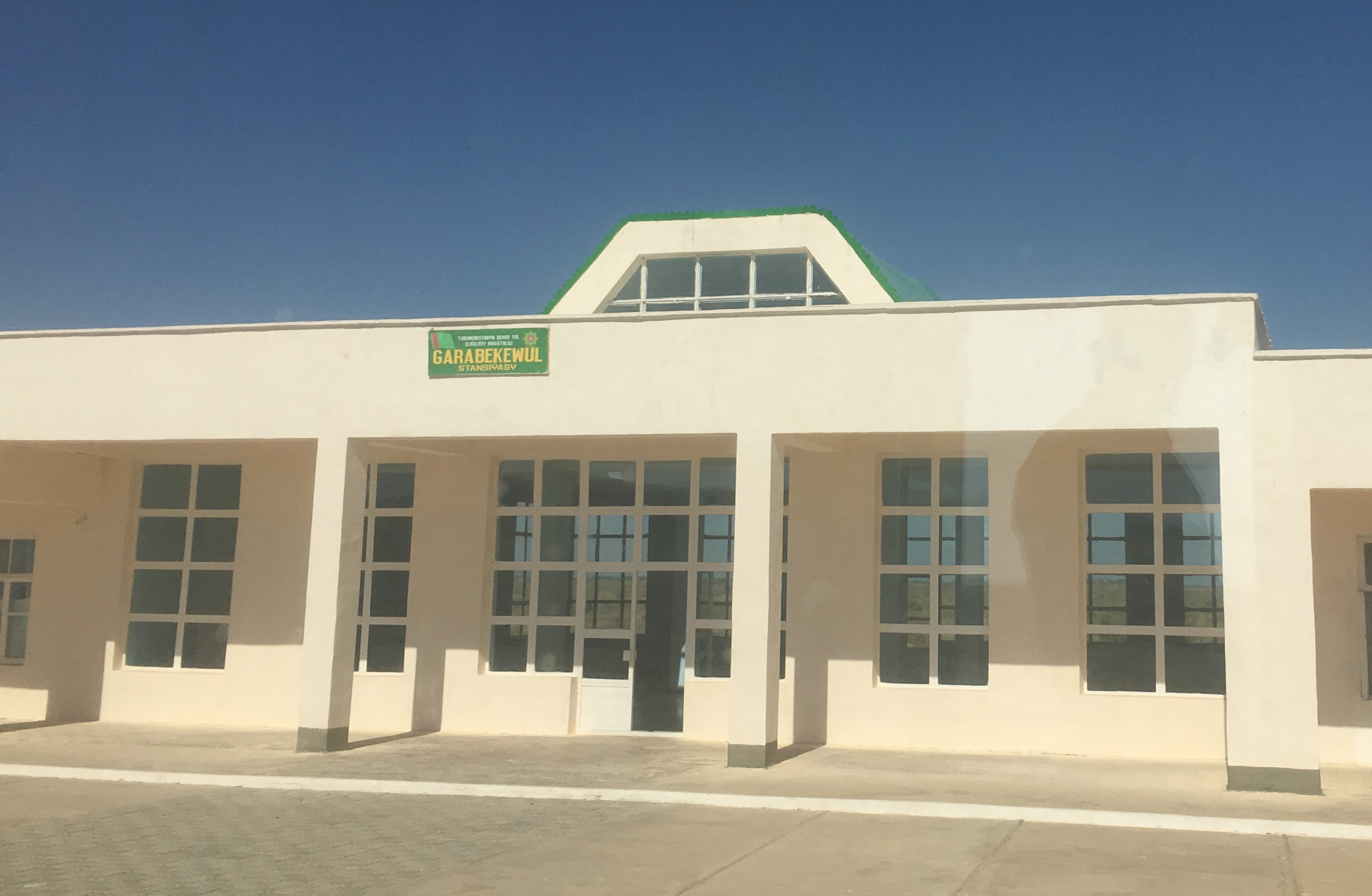
- Garabekewül rail station

- Location in Turkmenistan
- Coordinates: 38°28′59″N 64°09′09″E
- Country: Turkmenistan
- Province: Lebap Province
- District: Saýat District

Population (1989)
  - Total: 5,509
- Time zone: UTC+5
- Postal code: 746140
- Area code: (+993-443)

Garabekewül is a city in Saýat District, Lebap Province, Turkmenistan.

== Etymology ==
The terms Gara ("black") and Bekewül refer to two of the clans that make up the Ersari tribe, and Atanyyazow asserts that this is the origin of the toponym.

== Transportation ==
The city is located near the Amu Darya close to an eponymous rail station on the Türkmenabat-Kerki rail line.

== History ==
The town is famed as the birthplace of Seyitnazar Seydi, a classical poet as well as the military commander of Soltaniyaz Beg, who had unsuccessfully rebelled against the Bukhara Emirate. The ruins of Beg's fortress is located a short distance, north of the town.

=== Administration ===
Garabekewül was designated a "town of urban type" as of 1940. Until 5 May 1993 it was called Karabekaul (Russian: Карабекаул). It was upgraded to city status in July 2016. The city served as the administrative center of Garabekewül District until that district was abolished on 25 November 2017 by parliamentary decree. It was assigned to Halaç District until November 2022, when it was transferred to Saýat District.

== Population ==
1959	1970	1979	1989
2002	3113	3966	5509
