= Astanababa =

Town in Turkmenistan

Astanababa Astanababa şäherçesi
- Town
- Location in Turkmenistan
- Coordinates: 37°54′07″N 65°07′30″E
- Country: Turkmenistan
- Province: Lebap Province
- District: Kerki District

Population (2022 official census)
  - Town: 25,986
  - Urban: 11,466
  - Rural: 14,520
- Time zone: UTC+5

Astanababa (Russian: Астана-Баба) is a town in the Kerki District, Lebap Province, Turkmenistan. The town is located on the left bank of the Amu Darya River, about 12 km northwest of Kerki. There lies Astana-baba Mausoleum, which gives its name to the town. In 2022, Astanababa proper had a population of 11,466 people.

== Etymology ==
Astana, in Farsi, means mausoleum.

== History ==
The site was first studied by Russian orientalist Boris Litvinov in the fall of 1899. It was further studied by Galina Pugachenkova and Mikhail Masson.

== Sites ==
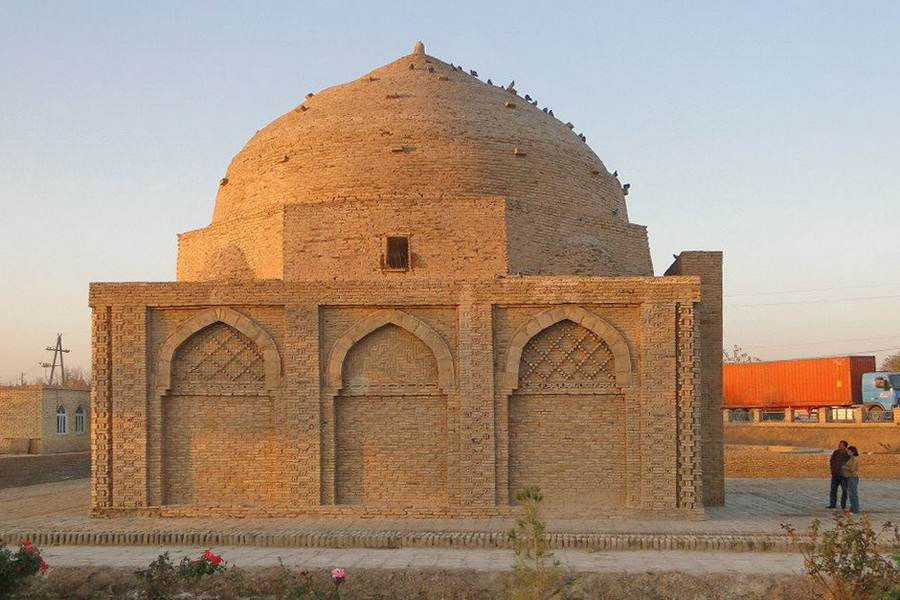
Alamberdar Mausoleum

=== Alamberdar Mausoleum ===
Some historians believe the structure to have been commissioned by Mahmud of Ghazni in memory of his ally (and Samanid ruler) Isma'il Muntasir; others attribute Muntasir himself. (Note: The Tarikh Yamini—a court-chronicle, drafted by Mahmud's secretary—dedicates the construction to his patron.) A square structure, three of its walls have blind niches; the brickwork is intensely decorative — Paul Brummell noted it to be among the finest examples of 11th c. Turkmen architecture. That the mausoleum did not become a shrine indicates that no saint was buried; it might have been a person from the secular spheres or none at all. In Turkmen tradition, an eponymous commander of Ali was buried at the site. (Note: Alamberdar went out in the dead of the night to locate a well, and fetch water for his thirsty troops. However, he misrecognized the flames and ended up at the enemy camp only to be assassinated. The next morning, his troops recovered his body, buried his ashes, and erected the mausoelum.)

=== Astana Baba Mausoleum ===
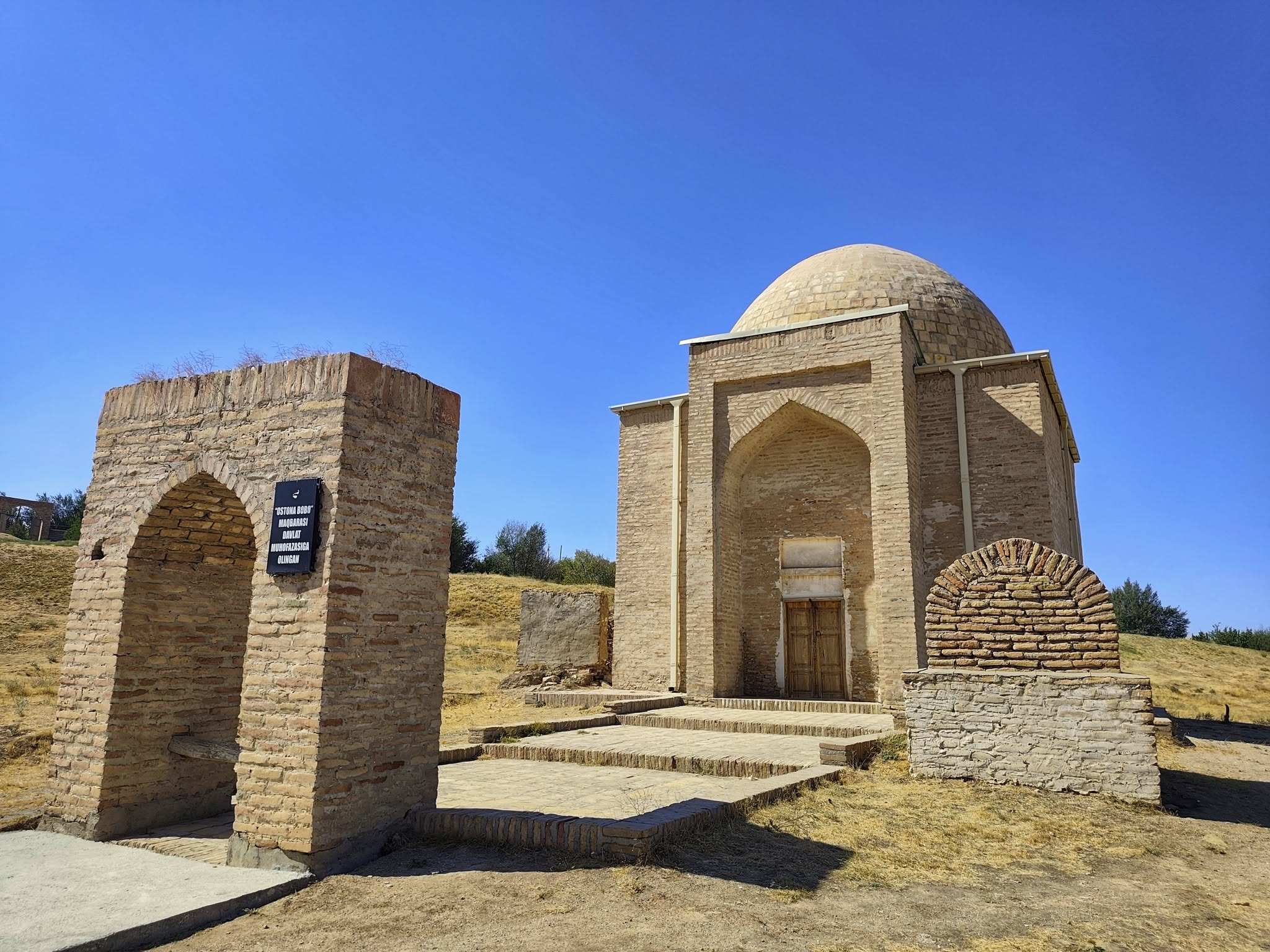
Astana Baba Mausoleum. Photographed by Pavel Novik

The complex — primarily, a set of four domed rooms — has been progressively expanded over the centuries. The entrance portal leads into a hall, before two successive pairs of domed rooms: the first pair is believed to be the oldest constructions, and contain a tomb and mosque. Beyond, comes the second pair constructed c. 19th century, containing two tombs each and known as the Kizlyar-Bibi Mausoleum. Identities of all the buried people remain unknown; local tradition asserts Ibn Ali Nur, a local ruler of Balkh, to have constructed the mausoleum for his daughter..

== Dependencies ==
Astanababa has three dependant rural settlements within its administrative boundaries:

- Astanababa, town
  - Botaýer, village
  - Gabşal, village
  - Sopyýer, village

== See also ==
- List of municipalities in Lebap Province
- Towns of Turkmenistan
