= Farap District =

District in Lebap Province, Turkmenistan

Farap District Farap Etraby
- District
- Interactive map of Farap District
- Country: Turkmenistan
- Province: Lebap Province
- Capital: Farap
- Time zone: UTC+5 (+5)

Farap District was a district of Lebap Province in Turkmenistan. The administrative center of the district was the town of Farap.

On 9 November 2022, this district was dissolved, and its territories were transferred to Çärjew District.
