= Jeňellihatap =

Jeňellihatap Jyňňylhatap, Dzhingilkhatab
- Location in Turkmenistan
- Coordinates: 37°39′40″N 65°27′27″E
- Country: Turkmenistan
- Province: Lebap Province
- District: Kerki District
- Rural Council: Hatap geňeşligi
- Elevation: 242 m (794 ft)

Jeňellihatap (also Jyňňylhatap or Dzhingilkhatab) is a village in Kerki District, Lebap Province, Turkmenistan near the border with Afghanistan.

== See also ==
- List of cities, towns and villages in Turkmenistan
