= Dostluk =

City in Turkmenistan

- Location in Turkmenistan Dostluk (Asia)
- Coordinates: 37°45′N 65°20′E
- Country: Turkmenistan
- Region: Lebap Region
- District: Köýtendag District
- Time zone: UTC+5

Dostluk (Turkmen pronunciation: [dostˈɫʊq]; lit. 'friendship') is a city in Köýtendag District, Lebap Province, Turkmenistan. On 27 July 2016, by Resolution No. 425-V it was upgraded from town status to a city. In 2010, the village of Azatlyk was subordinated to Dostluk.

During the Soviet period, it was called Yuzhnyy ("southern") in Russian.
