= Çärjew District =

- District
- Serdarabat District
- Interactive map of Çärjew District
- Country: Turkmenistan
- Province: Lebap Province
- Capital: Çärjew

Area
  - Total: 11,770 sq mi (30,490 km^{2})

Population (2022 census)
  - Total: 233,699
  - Density: 19.85/sq mi (7.665/km^{2})
- Time zone: UTC+5 (+5)

Çärjew District (formerly Türkmenabat/Serdarabat District) is a district of Lebap Province in Turkmenistan.

The administrative center of the district is the town of Çärjew, a town created on 28 November 2017 from the promotion of the village of "Guşçular" and the absorption of the following villages: Darganly, Garawul, Marküş, Orazaly, Ulywahym, Ýaňyaryk.

On the same date, 28 November, 2017, the district was renamed from Serdarabat District to its current name, Çärjew .

On 9 November 2022, Farap District was dissolved, and its territories were transferred to this district.

== Administrative Subdivisions ==
- Cities (şäherler)
  - Farap
- Towns (şäherçeler)
  - Çärjew (formerly "Guşçular" village council")(Guşçular, Darganly, Garawul, Marküş, Orazaly, Ulywahym, Ýaňyaryk)
  - Hojagala
  - Kiştiwan
- Village councils (geňeşlikler)
  - Amyderýa (Zähmetkeş, Gumly, Guýymugal, Hydyrili, Täzeoba, Ýokarymugal, Zarpçy)
  - Balta Myradow adyndaky (Açyl Mürzäýew adyndaky, Balta Myradow adyndaky, Baýatlar, Bereketli, Birleşik, Hojamekan, Ulyçarlak)
  - Bereket (Ýasydepe, Egrigüzer, Gaýybaýat, Gazagoba, Gökler, Täzeaý, Rowaç)
  - Bitik (Magtymguly, Bahar, Bitik, Çarmerde, 9-njy Maý, Gülabat, Täzeýol, Ýeketut)
  - Boýrabap (Gaýmakçy, Adak, Baýdakçy, Boýrabap, Galkynyş, Hojamiresen, Tally)
  - Garamyş (Garamyş, Bozarykly, Älemdar, Ýolbaşçy)
  - Hanoba (Goýgala, Händek, Parahat, Tuýgun)
  - Hojaili (Bekaryk, Babadaýhan, Dogryýap, Duryýap, Dostluk, Hojaaryk, Hojaili, Kerpiçli, Pagtaçy, Peşelioba, Sahyjan, Ýeňiş)
  - Hojakenepsi (Hojakenepsi, Akrabat, Eljik, Ýylmangala)
  - Jendi (Jendi, Başsaka, Goşaaryk, Joşgun, Kündearyk, Sandykly, Ýalkym)
  - Kölaryk (Kölaryk, Araplar, Asudalyk, Ak altyn, Balykçy, Esgioba, Joraýew, Könegulançy, Petdeli, Üçbaş)
  - Kyraç (Kyraç, Gumkent, Mergenli, Ýaşlyk)
  - Nobat Gutlyýew adyndaky (N.Gutlyýew adyndaky, Çümmekdepe, Çöpligarawul, Könearyk, Magtymguly Pyragy, Owlakdepe, Saýatly, Saýatlyoba, Täzedurmuş, Ýaşlar, Ýokaryaryk)
  - Osty (Osty, Gadyn, Gyrteki)
  - Sarykbala (Sarykbala, Agalaň, Dogryýol, Döwletli, Gagarin, Garawuldepe, Gurluşykçy, Guýyaryk)
  - Zergär (Gyzylýap, Alagöz, Arap, Döwletmämmet Azady adyndaky, Düýeçi, Hojamaşat, Seýdi, Şyhlar, Zergär)
