= Seh Juy =

Seh Juy سه جوي
- Village
- Location within Iran
- Coordinates: 32°03′00″N 50°06′36″E
- Country: Iran
- Province: Chaharmahal and Bakhtiari
- County: Kuhrang
- Bakhsh: Bazoft
- Rural District: Doab

Population (2006)
  - Total: 67
- Time zone: UTC+3:30 (IRST)
  - Summer (DST): UTC+4:30 (IRDT)

Seh Juy (Persian: سه جوي, also Romanized as Seh Jūy; also known as Seh Jū) is a village in Doab Rural District, Bazoft District, Kuhrang County, Chaharmahal and Bakhtiari Province, Iran. At the 2006 census, its population was 67, between 10 families. The village is populated by Lurs.
