= Halaç =

- Location in Turkmenistan
- Coordinates: 38°04′N 64°53′E
- Country: Turkmenistan
- Province: Lebap Province
- District: Halaç District
- Time zone: UTC+5

Halaç is a city and capital of Halaç District, Lebap Province, Turkmenistan.

== Etymology ==
Halaç (Halach) is the name of an ancient Oghuz Turkmen tribe. The meaning is obscure. Early linguists divided the name into two parts, gal aç ("remain hungry") or gal, aç ("stay, open"). Vambery considered it to be a corruption of gylyç ("sword").

The word is written in Persian as "Khalaj" (خلج) and also refers to an Oghuz Turkic ethnic group, the Khalaj people.
