= Halaç District =

Halaç District Halaç etraby
- District
- Interactive map of Halaç District
- Country: Turkmenistan
- Region: Lebap Region
- Capital: Halaç

Area
  - Total: 1,800 km^{2} (690 sq mi)

Population (2022)
  - Total: 133,909
  - Density: 74/km^{2} (190/sq mi)
- Time zone: UTC+5 (+5)

Halaç District (Turkmen: Halaç etraby) is a district in Lebap Region, Turkmenistan. Its administrative centre is the city of Halaç. Established in 1925, Halaç District had a population of 133,909 inhabitants, according to the 2022 Turkmenistan census and covers an area of 1,800 square kilometres (690 sq mi).

== History ==
Halaç District was founded in January 1925, on the western (left) bank of the Amu Darya, as part of Kerkin Region of the Turkmen Soviet Socialist Republic. The district was subsequently transferred between several administrative divisions during the Soviet period. On 25 November 2017, following a resolution of the Parliament of Turkmenistan, Garabekewül District was abolished and its territory incorporated into Halaç District.

== Administration ==
The administrative centre of the Halaç District is the city of Halaç. The district is divided into eight village councils (geňeşlikler): Altyn asyr, Esenmeňli, Güneşlik, Güýçbirleşik, Halaç, Oguzhan, Pelwert, and Surh.

== Demographics ==
Based on the 2022 Turkmenistan census, published by the State Committee for Statistics, Halaç had a population of 133,909 inhabitants. The area of the district is 1,800 square kilometres (690 sq mi), meaning a population density of 74.39 inhabitants per square kilometre. The district had slightly more females with 67,281 (50.2%), in comparison to 66,628 (49.8%) males and a mostly rural lifestyle with a majority of 105,628 (78.9%) inhabitants living in rural areas and 28,281 (21.1%) inhabitants living in urban areas.

== Infrastructure ==
In 2018, a groundwater deposit was discovered in Halaç District and registered at the end of the year as Halaç-II. The deposit covers an area of 58.7 square kilometres (22.7 sq mi) and has a water supply capacity of over 30,000 cubic metres per day. In February 2019, near the Esenmeňli Main Canal, a treatment plant for drinking water was in construction, with a designed capacity of 30,000 cubic metres per day.
