= Farap =

Capital of Farap District, Lebap Province, Turkmenistan

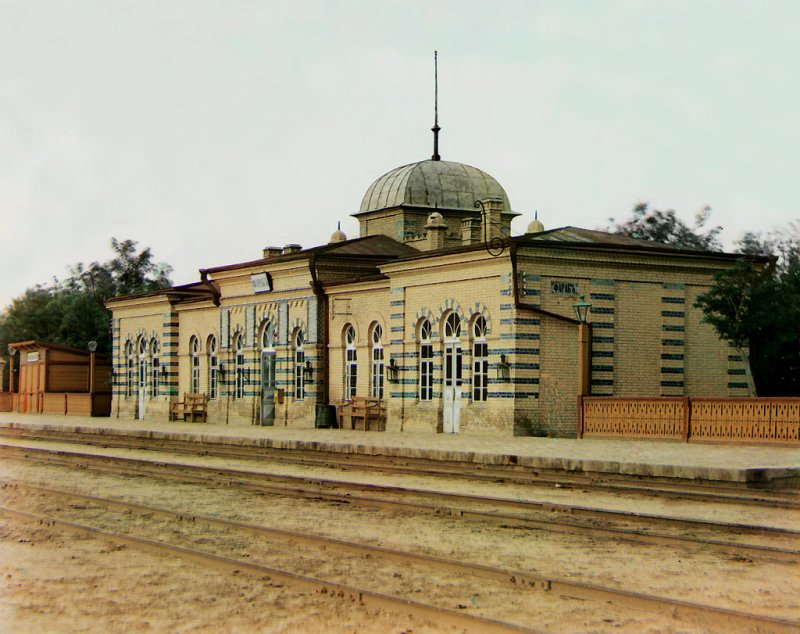
- 1911 photograph, created by Sergei Mikhailovich Prokudin-Gorskii.

- Location in Turkmenistan Farap (Asia)
- Coordinates: 39°10′N 63°36′E
- Country: Turkmenistan
- Region: Lebap Region
- District: Çärjew District
- Elevation: 187 m (614 ft)

Population (2012)
  - Total: 14,503
- Time zone: UTC+5 (+5)
- Postal code: 746070
- Area code: (+993) 448
- Vehicle registration: LB

Farap, also known as Farab, or Firabr, is a city in Çärjew District, Lebap Province, Turkmenistan.

== Etymology ==
The name is of obscure origin and meaning. Vambery considered it a corruption of a Persian phrase meaning "pure water".

== Overview ==
Farap is the site of a border crossing into Alat, Uzbekistan.

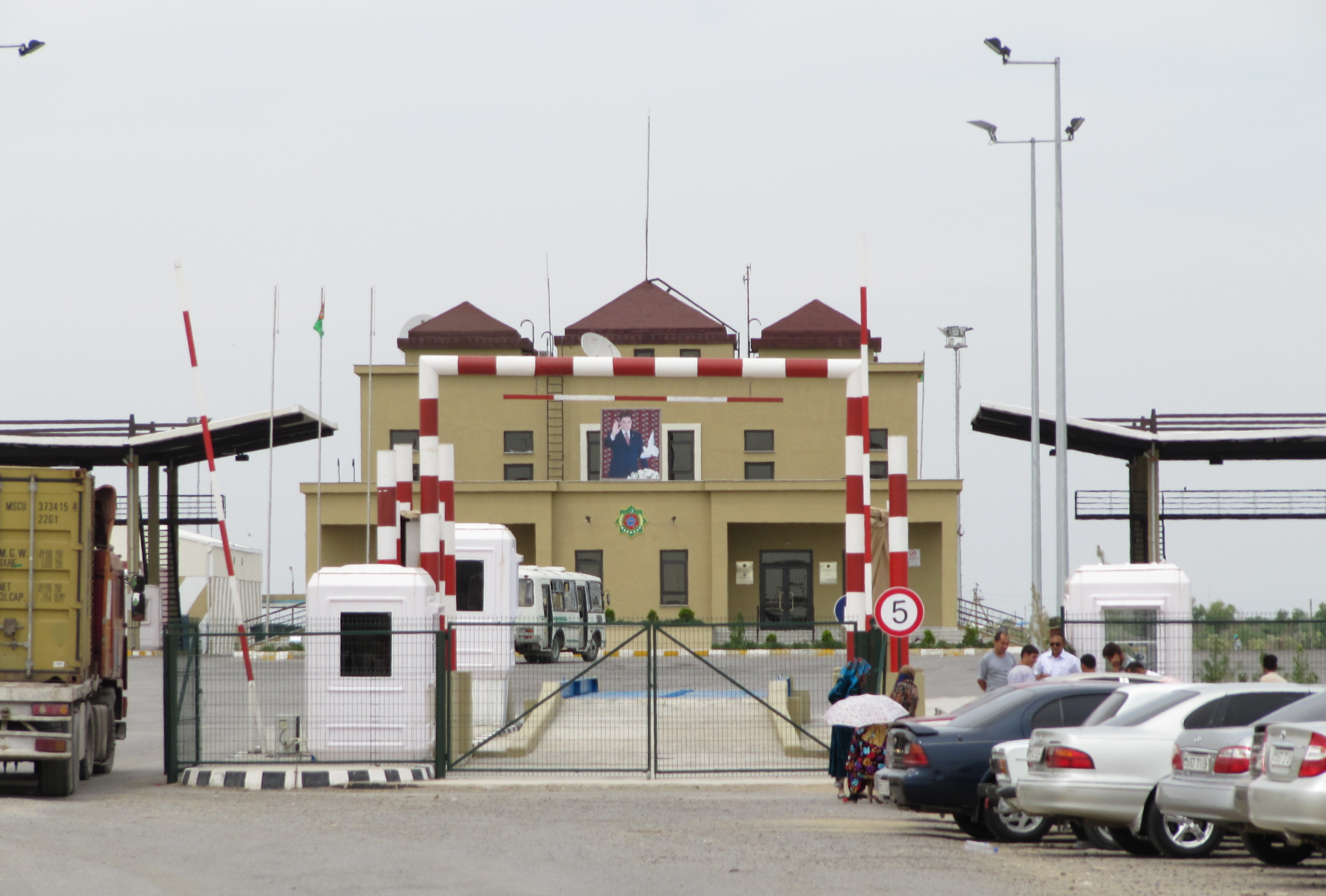
Border crossing from Farap into Alat, Uzbekistan.
