= Dänew District =

Dänew District Dänew etraby
- District
- Interactive map of Dänew District
- Country: Turkmenistan
- Province: Lebap Province
- Capital: Dänew

Area
  - Total: 2,351 sq mi (6,089 km^{2})

Population (2022 census)
  - Total: 159,634
  - Density: 67.90/sq mi (26.22/km^{2})
- Time zone: UTC+5 (+5)

Dänew District (formerly Galkynyş District) is a district of Lebap Province in Turkmenistan. The administrative center of the district is the town of Dänew. It was recognized as the "best district" in Turkmenistan for the year 2021.

== Administrative Subdivisions ==
- Cities (şäherler)
  - Dänew
  - Seýdi
- Towns (şäherçeler)
  - Asuda
  - Bahar (inc. Kerpiç zawodynyň şäherjigi)
  - Garaşsyzlyk
- Village councils (geňeşlikler)
  - Aşgabat (Aşgabat, Amyderýa, Abadan)
  - Azatlyk (Azatlyk, Ataoba)
  - Baragyz (Baragyz, Agar, Ärsary, Gazakçy)
  - Berzeň (Berzeň, Derýabaş, Händeklioba, Jendi, Ulyaryk, Garaşsyzlyk)
  - Boýnyuzyn (Kaksaçan, Boýnyuzyn, Durmuşly, Kepderli, Traktorçy, Ýazaryk)
  - Döwletabat (Watan, Puşkin, Şöhrat, Ýaşlyk, Zergömen)
  - Gabakly (Gabaklyoba)
  - Göýnük (Göýnük, Goşaköpri, Kulyýewa adyndaky, Nogaý, Şenbebazar)
  - Isbaz (Isbaz)
  - Maý (Maý, Araphana, Bilal, Dürýap, Mürzegala, Ýolum)
  - Ödeý (Ödeý, Akaltyn, Belme, Garagum, Çeges)
  - Parahat (Parahat, Dostluk)
  - Ýyldyz (Ýyldyz, Baýat, Gazarçy, Händekli, Sazaklyk, Täzegüýç, Wahym)
