= Kerki District =

Kerki District Kërki Etraby
- District
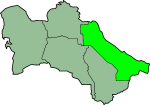
- Lebap province, where Kerki is located
- Interactive map of Kerki District
- Country: Turkmenistan
- Province: Lebap Province
- Capital: Kerki
- Established: 1925

Area
  - Total: 6,780 sq mi (17,550 km^{2})

Population (2022 census)
  - Total: 132,562
  - Density: 19.56/sq mi (7.553/km^{2})
- Time zone: UTC+5 (+5)

Kerki District (formerly Atamyrat District) (1999–2017) is a district of Lebap Province in Turkmenistan. The administrative center of the district is the town of Kerki. It is found in 1925.

Between 29 December 1999 and 25 November 2017, the district was known as Atamyrat District.

== Administrative Subdivisions ==
- Cities (şäherler)
  - Kerki
- Towns (şäherçeler)
  - Astanababa
  - Başsaka (inc. Könebaşsaka)
- Village councils (geňeşlikler)
  - Çekir (Çekir, Etbaşoba, Gabasakgal, Garaja, Güýç, Jeňňel)
  - Daşlyk (Lebap, Daşlyk, Tokaýçylar, Ussalar)
  - Guwak (Guwak, Güneşoba, Mukryoba, Mürzebeg)
  - Gyzylaýak (Gyzylaýak, Bazarjaý, Parahat)
  - Hatap (Hatap, Çömmeklihatap, Galaly, Galalyaryk, Jeňellihatap, Mukryaryk)
