= Türkmenabat =

Capital of Lebap Province, Turkmenistan

Türkmenabat Türkmenabat şäheri
- City
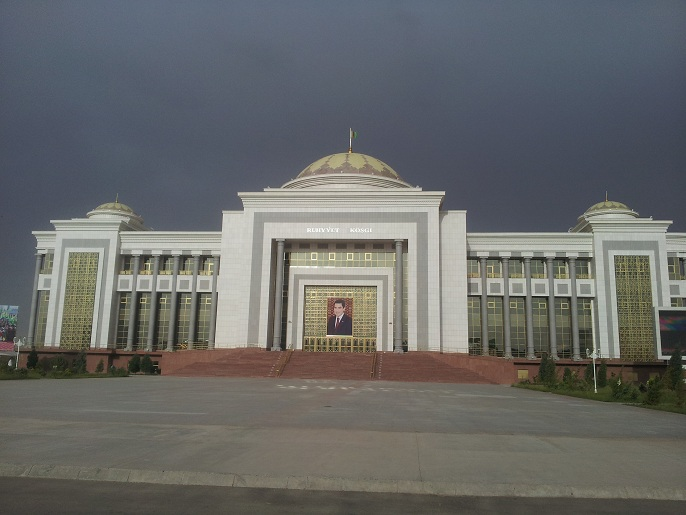
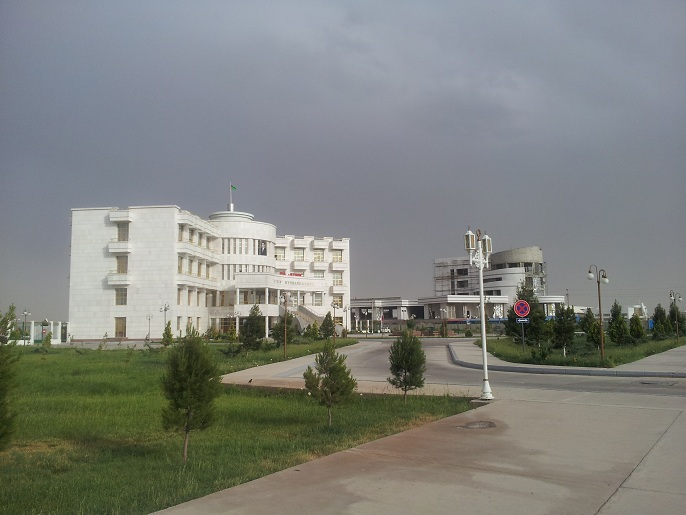
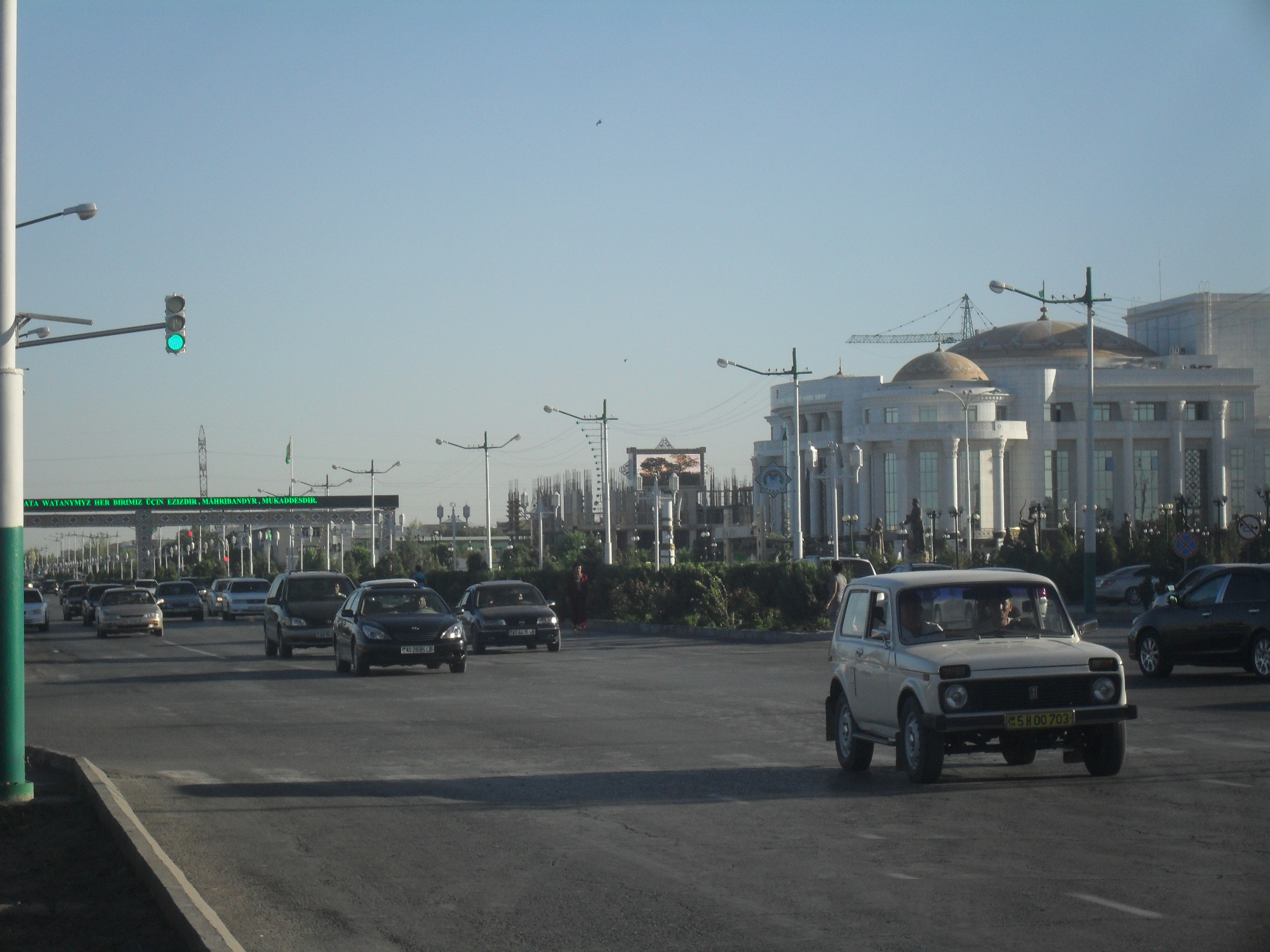
- Ruhyýet Palace (above), Marble buildings along the street Bitarap Türkmenistan (left); City's East Side (right)

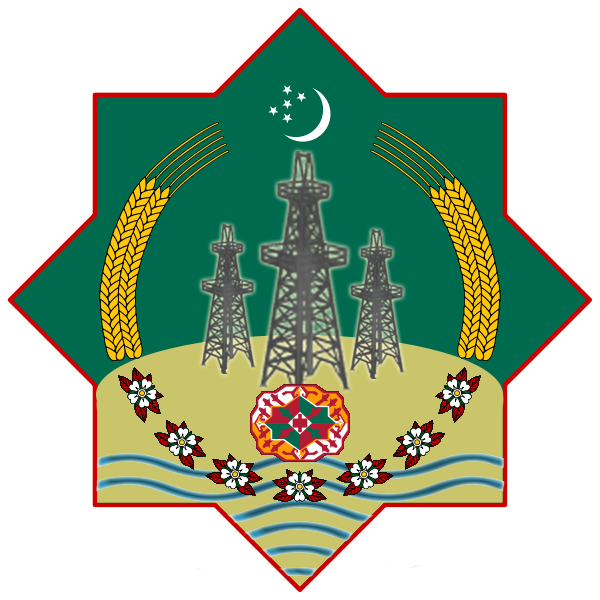
- Seal

- Location in Turkmenistan
- Coordinates: 39°00′14″N 63°34′07″E
- Country: Turkmenistan
- Province: Lebap Province

Government
  - Häkim: Guwanç H. Bazarow

Area
  - Total: 158.5 km^{2} (61.2 sq mi)
- Elevation: 187 m (614 ft)

Population (2022 census)
  - Total: 230,861
  - Density: 1,457/km^{2} (3,772/sq mi)
- Time zone: UTC+05:00 (TMT)
- Postal code: 746100
- Area code: +993 422
- Vehicle registration: LB

Türkmenabat (Note: Formerly known as Amul until 1924; Leninsk from 1924 to 1927; Çarjuý (Russian: Чарджуй, romanized: Chardzhuy) from 1927 to 1940; Çärjew (Russian: Чарджев, romanized: Chardzhev) from 1940 to 1992; Çarjow from 1992 to 1999.) (Turkmen pronunciation: [tʏɾkˌmønɑˈbɑːt]), is the second-largest city in Turkmenistan and the administrative centre of Lebap Province. As of 2022, it had a population of approximately 231,000 people (up from 161,000 in the 1989 census).

== Etymology ==
The former name of the city, Çärjew, is a Turkmen borrowing from the Persian chahârjuy (چهارجوى), meaning 'four streams'. This type of naming is also common in Iran, such as the village Se Juy ('three streams'). The current name of the city is simply a combining of Türkmen and the Persian suffix âbâd (آباد), meaning 'dwelling of'.

== Geography ==
Türkmenabat is located at an altitude of 187 m (614 ft) on the banks of the Amu Darya River, near the border with Uzbekistan. Türkmenabat is at the center of Lebap province, which has borders with three provinces in Turkmenistan: Mary, Ahal and Daşoguz. The province also borders Uzbekistan and Afghanistan.

Some 70 kilometres (43 miles) south of Türkmenabat in the East Karakum Desert is the Repetek Nature Reserve, famed for its zemzen, or desert crocodiles.

== History ==
A modern industrial city, Türkmenabat's history spans 2,000 years. In ancient times, it was known as Āmul (to be distinguished from the Iranian city of Amol). The river Amu Darya is said to mean River of Āmul, named after this ancient city. Türkmenabat was the hub in an intersection of three routes of the Great Silk Road leading to Bukhara, Khiva and Merv. For centuries, Āmul was an important town of the Uzbek feudal khanate (later emirate) of Bukhara.

When the Russian Empire began annexing Central Asian Turkestan, Āmul was surrendered to Russians by the Bukhara emirate, which subsequently became a vassal of Russia and pledged allegiance to the Russian emperor. The modern city was founded in 1886, when Russian Cossacks settled in Uralka in what is now the eastern part of Türkmenabat, naming their settlement New-Chardjuy. Settlement here was necessary to complete construction of the Trans-Caspian railway.

After the 1917 Russian Revolution, during which the Bolsheviks came into power, communists merged the former Central Asian oblasts of the Russian Empire along with the former Khanates of Khiva (Khorezm) and Bukhara into republics on the basis of nationality. In 1924, Türkmenabat (known as Çärjew at the time) city's sedentary and urban population was Uzbek. But at the time, as Turkmens were a largely nomadic nation, and Soviet economic and industrialization plans for the proposed Turkmen SSR required a relatively large anchor city; thus the city was passed to the newly created Turkmen Soviet Socialist Republic.

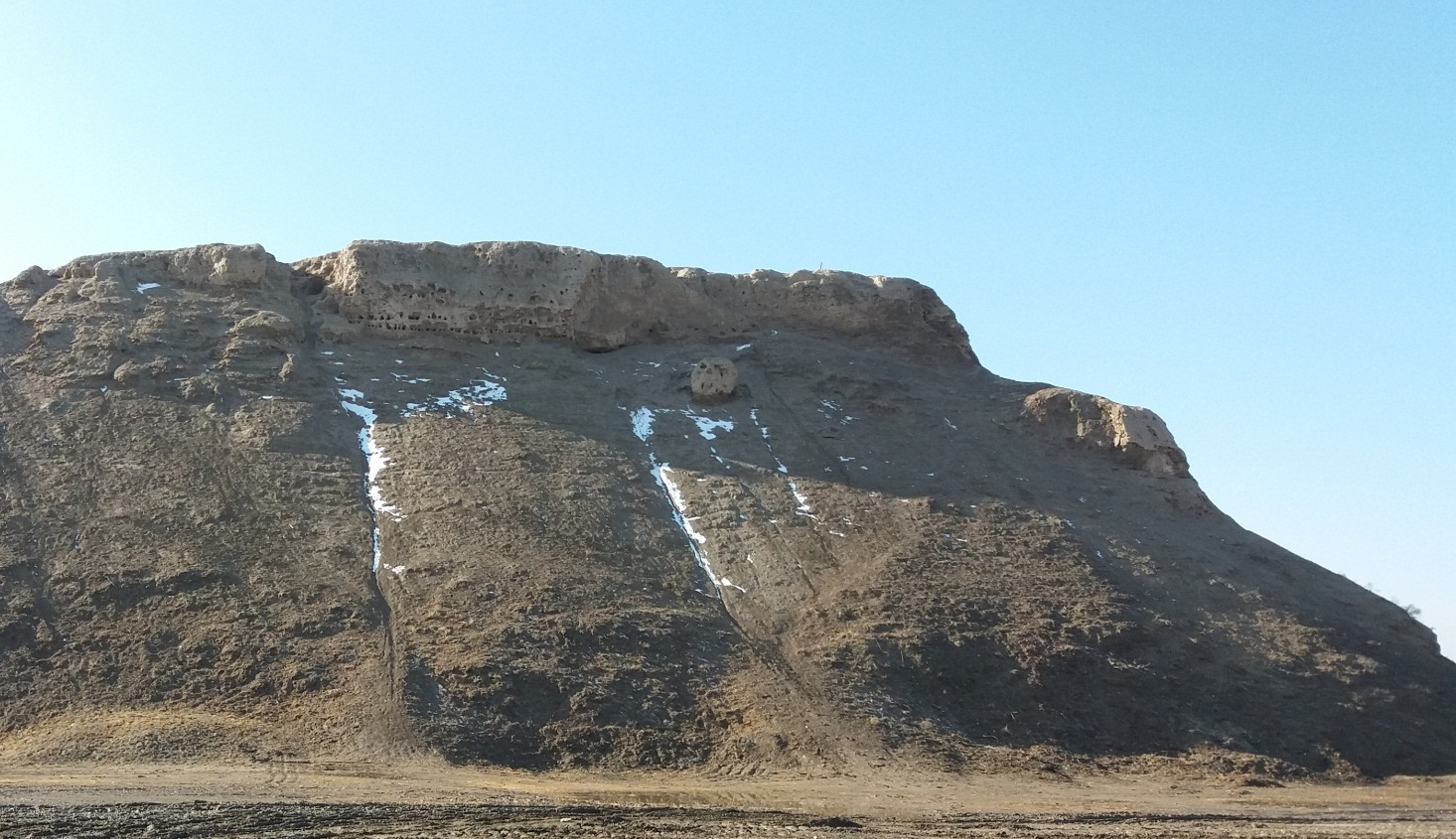
Ruins of the medieval fortress of Amul, an ancient Silk Road city located on the southern outskirts of modern Türkmenabat

Its role as a railway junction, and the high fertility of the Amu Darya region, made it the major trade center for agricultural products in the northeast region of the country. The city features food processing, textile (cotton processing and silk) factories. Çärjew was Turkmenistan's industrial and transport hub during the Soviet period, but most of these related jobs and transport opportunities have been relocated to Ashgabat or closed since Turkmenistan's independence.

From the article about Çärjew in the Brockhaus and Efron Encyclopedic Dictionary (beginning of the 20th century):

Chardjuy is an urban settlement formed near the Amu-Darya station (1070 c. from Krasnovodsk) of the Central Asian Railway, on the left bank of the Amu-Darya River, on land ceded by the emir of Bukhara to the Russian government. There are 4,068 inhabitants (2,651 men and 1,417 women), including 3,501 Russians. There are wide straight streets, enough greenery, many shops, and a rather lively bazaar. Chardjuy is an important trade center, where goods going to Bukhara, Khiva, and partly to Afghanistan, are loaded onto river vessels. The steamboat of the Amu Darya fleet maintains communication between Patta Gissar (Termez) in the south and Petro-Aleksandrovsky (Khiva)... At 16 verst from Chardjuy lies the rather large Bukharan city of Chardjuy (native Chardjuy), the center of Chardjuy province (bekstvo), with the remains of walls and a fortress; 15 thousand inhabitants. Old Chardjuy (Amu-Darya) is characterized by a lively trade exchange. In 1900, 1820244 pd arrived at the station. (military supplies, sugar, timber, building material, iron, flour, tea, rice, etc.); Sent from the Chardjuy station in the same year: 963382 (leather, carpets, sheepskin, cotton seed, cotton - 516641 pd, wool, etc.).

The third edition of the Great Soviet Encyclopedia wrote of the city:

Chardzhou, city, center of Chardzhou oblast of Turkmen SSR, pier on the left bank of the Amu Darya (where the Krasnovodsk-Tashkent railroad line crosses). From Chardzhou the Kungrad-Makat rail line begins. 113,000 residents in 1977 (51,000 in 1939). It arose in the 1880s as a Russian fortification on the territory of the Khanate of Bukhara. From 1886 the city, named New Chardzou, was a commercial and transportation hub of Central Asia (in 1888 the Central Asian Railway came through Chardzhou). From 1918-24 it was part of the Turkestan ASSR; from 1924, the Turkmen SSR. From 1937, it was named Chardzhou. From 1939-63 and since 1970, it was an oblast center.

== Climate ==
Türkmenabat has a cold desert climate (Köppen climate classification BWk), with cool winters and very hot summers. Rainfall is generally light and erratic, and occurs mainly in the winter and spring months.

Climate data for Türkmenabat (1991–2020, extremes 1894-present)
Month	Jan	Feb	Mar	Apr	May	Jun	Jul	Aug	Sep	Oct	Nov	Dec	Year
Record high °C (°F)	24.0 (75.2)	28.4 (83.1)	35.9 (96.6)	40.3 (104.5)	42.9 (109.2)	46.4 (115.5)	46.2 (115.2)	43.0 (109.4)	40.4 (104.7)	37.3 (99.1)	31.9 (89.4)	26.6 (79.9)	46.4 (115.5)
Mean daily maximum °C (°F)	7.9 (46.2)	10.8 (51.4)	17.5 (63.5)	24.8 (76.6)	30.7 (87.3)	35.5 (95.9)	36.7 (98.1)	35.2 (95.4)	30.1 (86.2)	23.3 (73.9)	14.9 (58.8)	8.7 (47.7)	23.0 (73.4)
Daily mean °C (°F)	2.6 (36.7)	4.9 (40.8)	11.0 (51.8)	17.8 (64.0)	23.7 (74.7)	28.3 (82.9)	29.6 (85.3)	27.4 (81.3)	21.5 (70.7)	14.7 (58.5)	8.0 (46.4)	3.5 (38.3)	16.1 (61.0)
Mean daily minimum °C (°F)	−1.7 (28.9)	0.0 (32.0)	5.2 (41.4)	11.0 (51.8)	16.0 (60.8)	19.9 (67.8)	21.3 (70.3)	18.9 (66.0)	13.1 (55.6)	7.2 (45.0)	2.4 (36.3)	−0.8 (30.6)	9.4 (48.9)
Record low °C (°F)	−25.4 (−13.7)	−22.2 (−8.0)	−16.3 (2.7)	−4.6 (23.7)	0.8 (33.4)	9.4 (48.9)	11.2 (52.2)	8.9 (48.0)	0.0 (32.0)	−9.5 (14.9)	−19.8 (−3.6)	−22.8 (−9.0)	−25.4 (−13.7)
Average precipitation mm (inches)	17 (0.7)	25 (1.0)	25 (1.0)	17 (0.7)	15 (0.6)	1 (0.0)	0.7 (0.03)	0.4 (0.02)	0.6 (0.02)	3 (0.1)	12 (0.5)	13 (0.5)	131 (5.2)
Average precipitation days (≥ 0.1 mm)	6.3	5.8	5.6	4.7	2.0	0.5	0.2	0.3	0.2	1.5	5.2	6.3	38.6
Average relative humidity (%)	76.9	69.6	59.4	51.4	43.1	36.0	37.4	38.1	43.3	54.4	69.3	77.2	54.7
Mean monthly sunshine hours	131.8	153.2	197.6	242.1	330.3	384.5	395.3	379.1	322.7	267.7	193.7	132.0	3,130
Mean daily sunshine hours	4.3	5.4	6.4	8.1	10.7	12.8	12.8	12.2	10.8	8.6	6.5	4.3	8.6
Source 1: Pogoda.ru.net
Source 2: NOAA (humidity, sun 1961–1990), Deutscher Wetterdienst (daily sun 1961-1990)

== Demographics ==
Türkmenabat is noted for possessing its own dialect of the Turkmen language. This regional dialect is a hybrid of the Turkmen and Uzbek languages, which have heavily influenced the area's culture and customs. This dialect is primarily spoken in Türkmenabat and the northern districts of Lebap province.

== Transportation ==
=== Urban transport ===
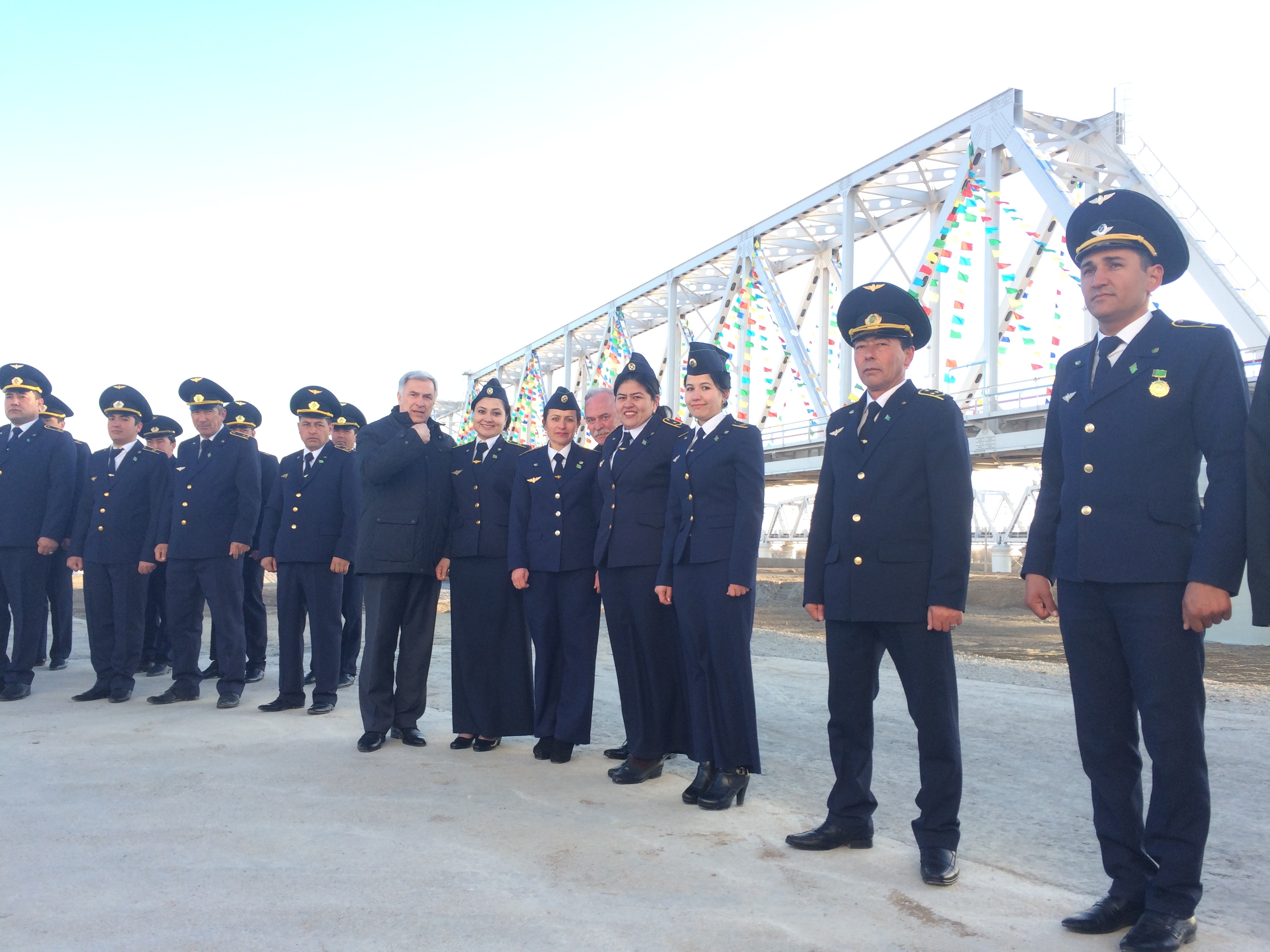
Turkmen Railways employees pose in front of the newly commissioned rail bridge across the Amu Darya at Türkmenabat, 7 March 2017

Türkmenabat is connected with the Turkmen capital Ashgabat and Turkmen port city Türkmenbaşy by M37 highway. In March 2017, two new bridges, one for rail and one for motor vehicles, were opened for crossing the Amu Darya at Türkmenabat. The rail bridge replaced one built in the early 1900s, and the automobile bridge replaced a pontoon bridge.

Türkmenabat bus terminal provides regional bus connections and intercity bus connections. The bus station is designed to serve 700 passengers per day.

In Türkmenabat taxis are available at any time of the day or night. Passengers may also hire taxicabs via mobile apps. Other hailing methods, such as telephone based calls or raising one's hand on the street, are also common as well.

The city is a short distance from the international border crossing with Uzbekistan at Farap.

=== Air ===
A new terminal of Türkmenabat International Airport opened in 2018, located in a newly annexed part of the city at its southern edge. The capacity of the airport complex is 500 passengers per hour. Türkmenabat offers scheduled air service to and from Ashgabat and Balkanabat

=== Railways ===
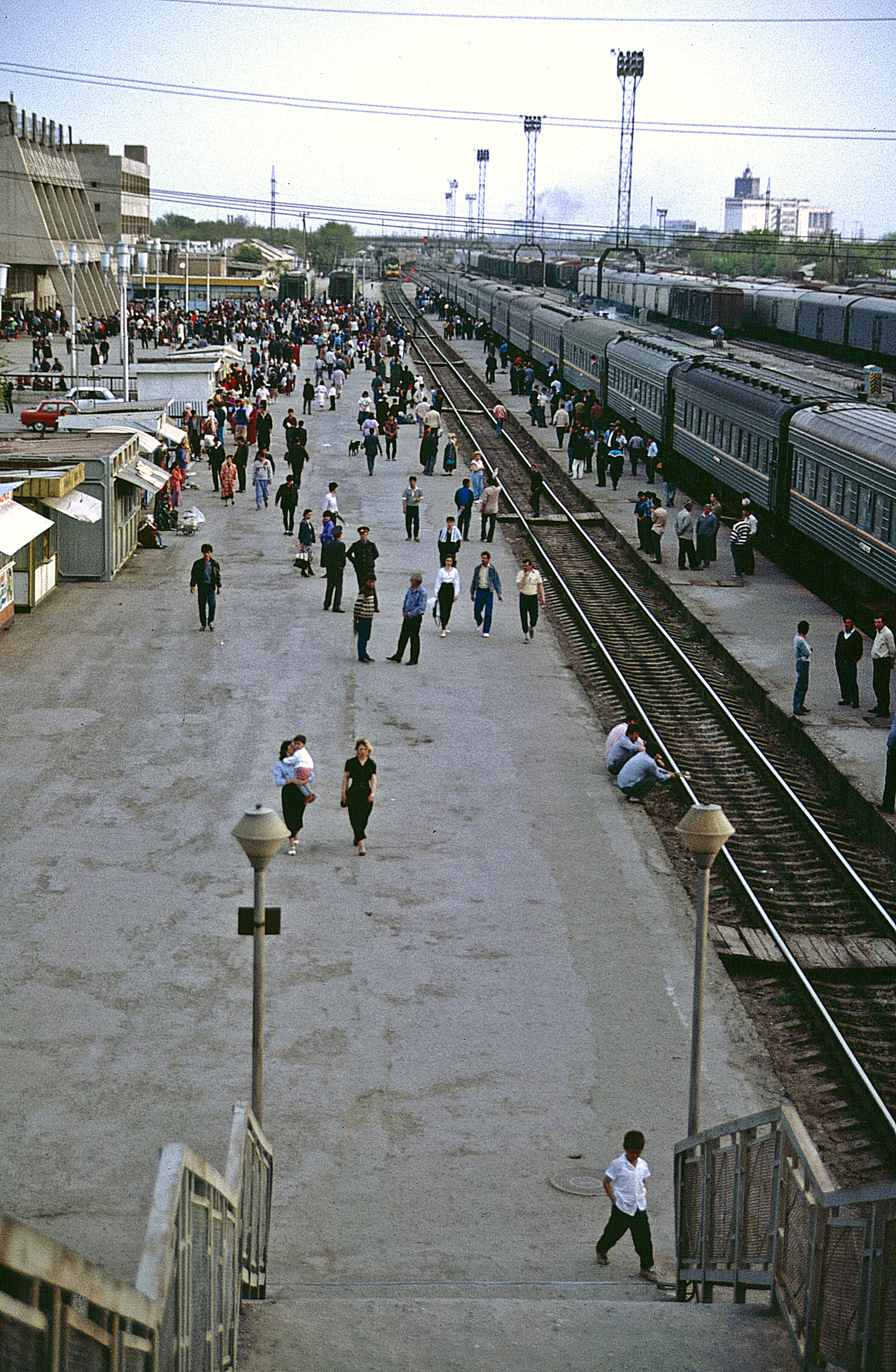
Türkmenabat Railway Station in 1992

Türkmenabat is connected with Ashgabat, Mary, Kerki, Gazojak and other cities in Turkmenistan by train. The Türkmenabat-Kerki line was opened on 29 September 1999, with a length of 203 kilometers.

The main railway station is located in the Türkmenabat city centre and includes a main two-story building, a ticket office building and some other technical buildings.

=== Motorways ===
Türkmenabat is linked to Ashgabat, Mary, Tejen and neighbouring countries by the country's 970 km motorway network.

== Telecommunication ==
2G, 3G and LTE networks from Altyn Asyr are available in the city. The most popular forms of Internet access are cable networks and ADSL by Turkmentelecom. Previously popular Dial-up has almost lost its position, at the same time actively developing wireless technology Wi-Fi.

There are 9 Türkmenpoçta postal operator branches in the city.

== Culture ==
Tasinlikler meýdançasy is a park where people celebrate national holidays.

Türkmenabat is known for its bazaars. The largest bazaar is "World Bazaar" (Turkmen: Dünýa bazar). Other well-known bazaars are Gök bazar (Green Bazaar) and Merkezi bazar (Central Bazaar). People throughout the country come to Türkmenabat to purchase local, Chinese, Turkish, Uzbek and Russian goods. Dünýä bazar has many sections, including those for jewelry, home appliances, clothes, dairy products, and automobiles.

Zaton, an artificial beach located about 5 kilometres (3.1 mi) from the center of the city, is a major recreational area. During the summer, youth gather at Zaton to relax.

== Education ==
Türkmenabat has one state-owned pedagogical university, Seýitnazar Seýdi adyndaky Türkmen Döwlet Mugallymçylyk Instituty; a medical college, public schools, and specialised art and sports schools.

== International relations ==
- İzmir, Turkey (1994)
- Rizhao, China (2014)
