= Lebap Region =

Region of Turkmenistan

Coordinates: 39°0′N 63°0′E

Lebap Lebap welaýaty
- Region
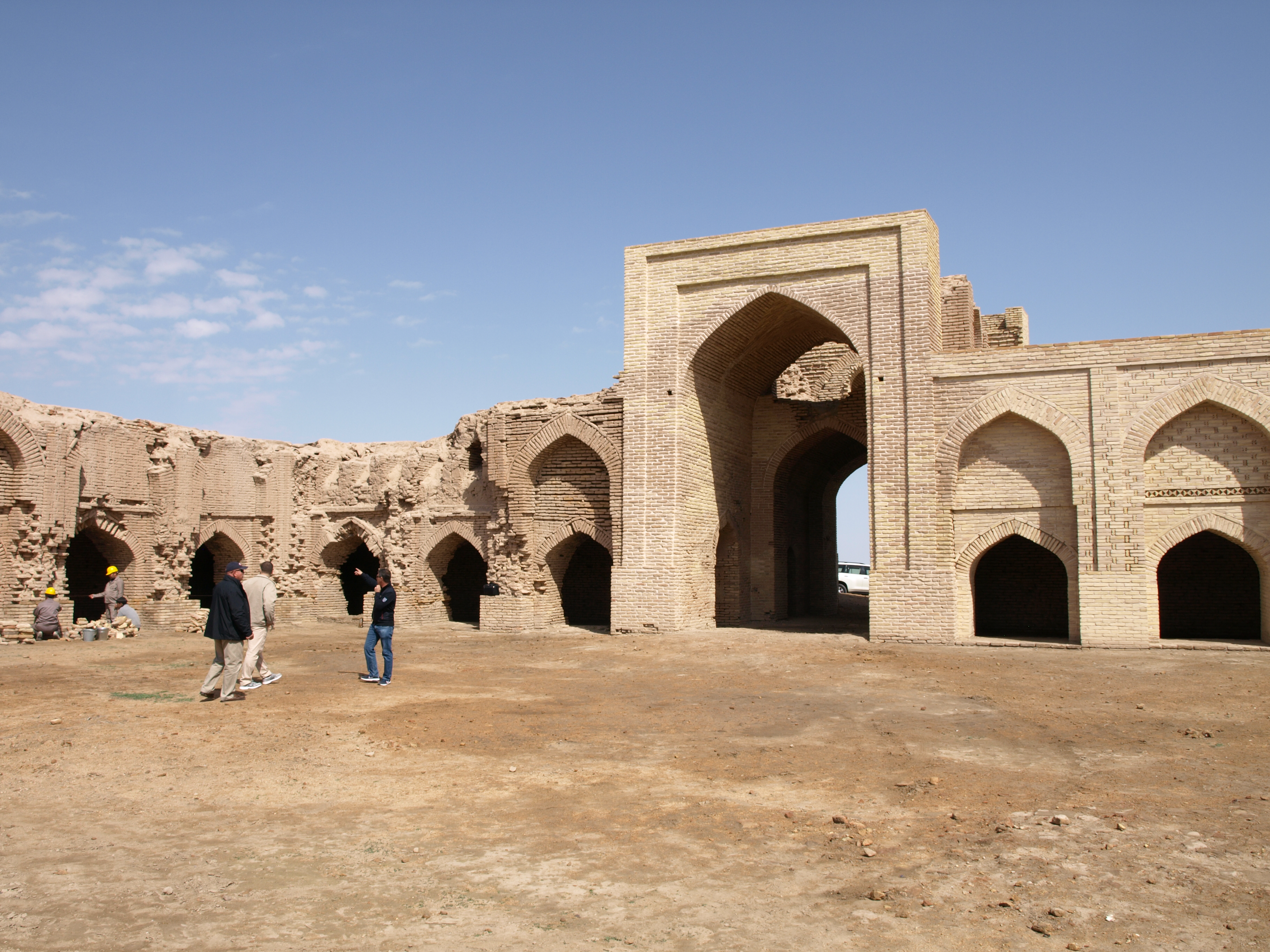
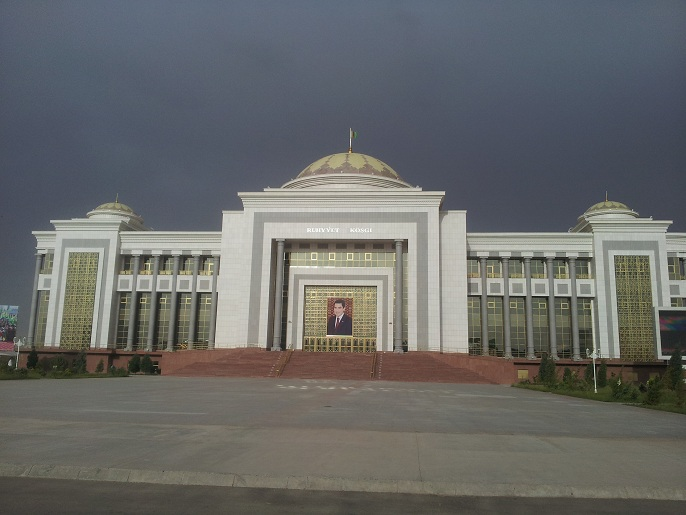
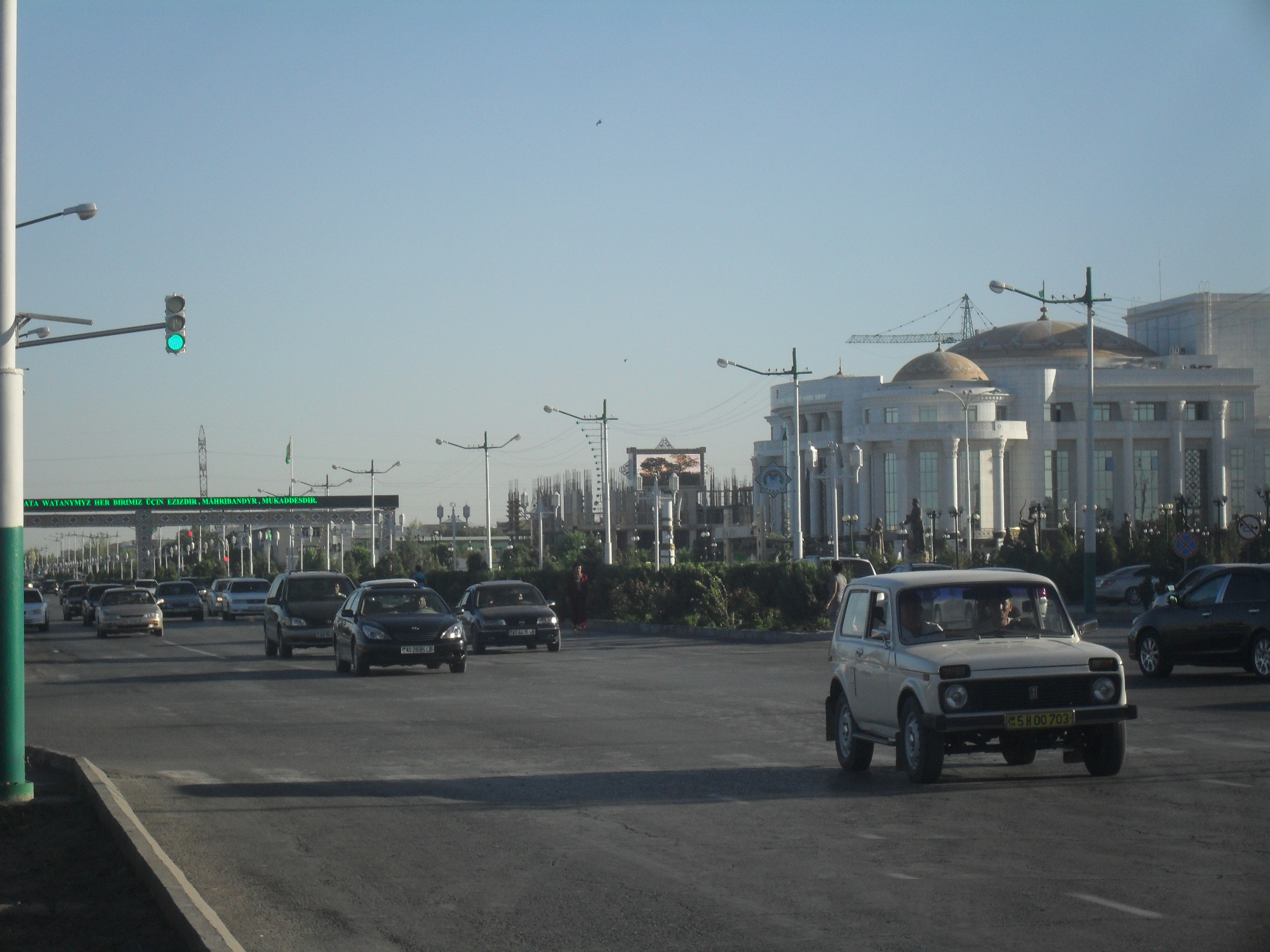
- From the top, Entrance to Dayahatyn, Lebap Region Palace of Spirituality, Türkmenabat

- Lebap region in Turkmenistan
- Country: Turkmenistan
- Capital: Türkmenabat

Area
  - Total: 93,727 km^{2} (36,188 sq mi)

Population (2022 (census))
  - Total: 1,447,298
  - Density: 15.442/km^{2} (39.994/sq mi)
- Website: lebap.gov.tm

Lebap Region (Turkmen: Lebap welaýaty, IPA: [leˈbɑːp βeˌɫɑːjɑˈtɯ]) is one of the five regions of Turkmenistan. It borders Afghanistan and Uzbekistan along the Amu Darya river. Its administrative centre is Türkmenabat (formerly Çärjew). Lebap covers an area of 93,727 square kilometres (36,188 mi^{2}), and it has a population of 1,447,298 as of the 2022 census.

The name Lebap is derived from Persian Lab-e âb (لب آب [ˌlæb‿e ˈʔɒːb]) 'riverside', and has long been used to designate the middle reaches of the Amu Darya.

It contains the Repetek Nature Reserve as well as the Köýtendag Nature Reserve, which includes Turkmenistan's highest mountain, Aýrybaba. Lebap is also home to the Dayahatyn caravansaray.

The region is located along the Amu Darya. The Kyzylkum Desert is located on the east side of the river and Karakum Desert is located on the west side of the river. About three-quarters of the region's land area is in the Karakum Desert. The region's sunny weather and abundance of water resources help produce high-quality long-staple cotton.

== History ==
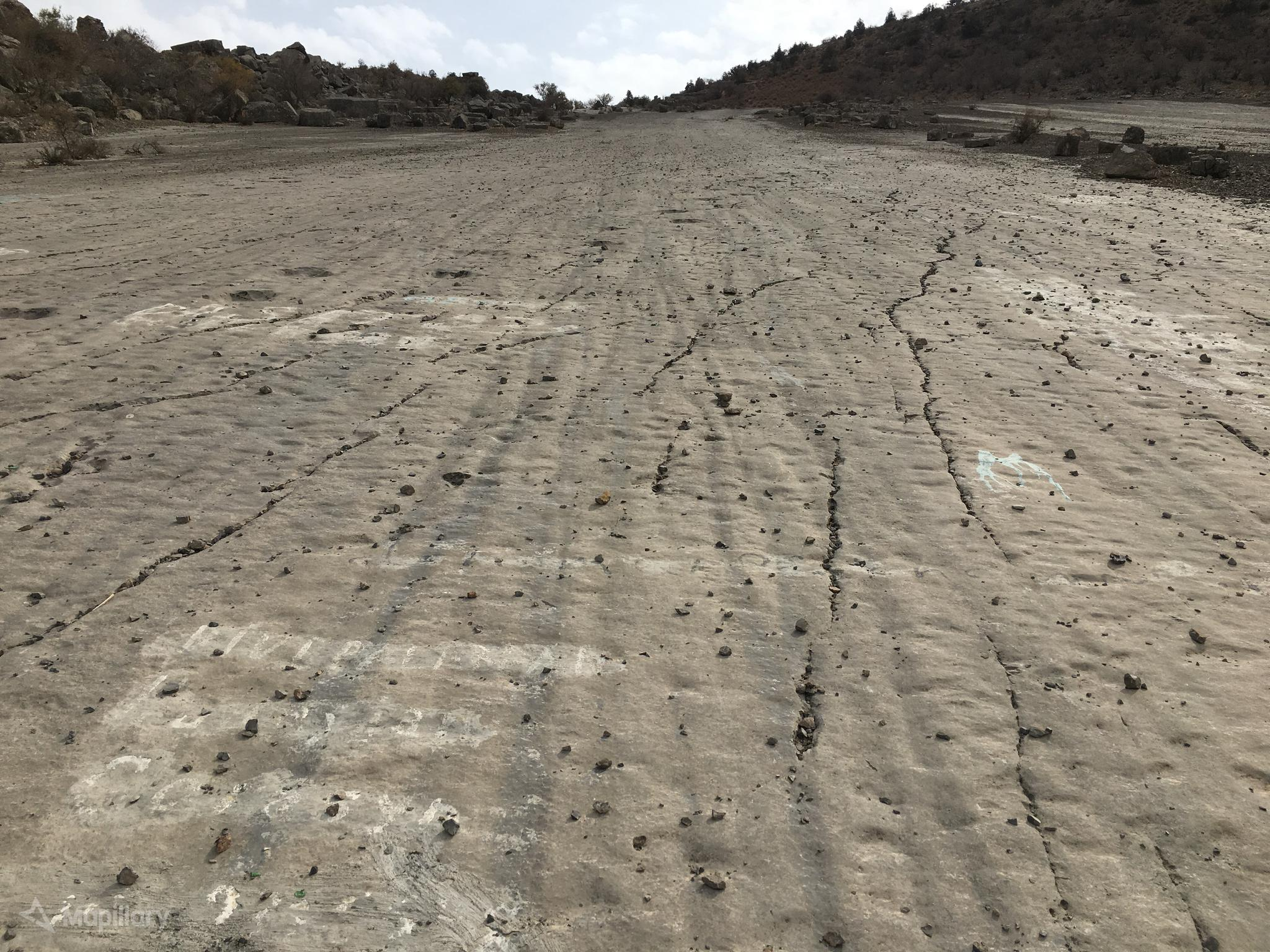
Dinosaur Plateau in Koytendag District

The region of present-day Lebap once occupied a spot along the Silk Road. The 9th-10th century caravansaray of Dayahatyn is located within Lebap.

=== Bukhara and Khiva khanates ===
Prior to the Russian Revolution, much of today's Lebap Region was part of either the Khanate of Bukhara or the Khanate of Khiva. The last khan of Bukhara, Sayyid Mir Muhammad Alim Khan, nominally submitted to Soviet authority, but in reality joined the Basmachi movement and rebelled against the Bolsheviks. He fled in 1920, and the area was declared a people's republic until Soviet power was firmly established in 1924. In that same year, the settlements at Çärjew and Kerki were formally assigned to the Turkmen Soviet Socialist Republic, along with the western parts of the Khiva khanate along the Amu Darya.

=== Recent history ===
On April 27, 2020, the region was hit by a severe windstorm. RadioFreeEurope/RadioLiberty alleged that the storm disrupted much of the region's electrical grid, public water supplies, natural gas connections, cell service, and internet connection. A local human rights website, Turkmen.news, reported that many people were admitted to the regional hospital in Türkmenabat after suffering injuries. They also alleged that there was sporadic looting in the storm's aftermath and that food prices in the region rose as a result of the storm. Local Turkmen media reported 10 deaths resulting from the storm, while Turkmen.news suggested that the true death toll was likely in the dozens, and dozens remained unaccounted for in the storm's aftermath. The rights group Human Rights Watch condemned what it perceived as "censorship" by local officials following the storm, noting that one group alleged that local police were watching out for people filming the storm's damage, and another group reported that dozens of people were detained for allegedly sending videos "abroad".

In December 2020, RadioFreeEurope/RadioLiberty reported that regional officials threatened to cut off the region's population from subsidized food if they were not up to date on their utility bills. The agency reported that many in the region received seasonal income from farming, and often did not earn money in the winter, and such matters were complicated by a decrease in remittances to the region as a result of the economic fallout from COVID-19.

== Demographic ==
=== Table of National composition of the population of Lebap region (2022) ===
Table:

Ethnicity	Total		Urban		Rural		
Ethnicity	Population	%	Population	%	Population	%	
Ethnicity	Turkmens	1,292,180	89.28%	555,200	84.63%	736,980	93.14%
Uzbeks	136,499	9.43%	83,556	12.74%	52,943	6.69%	
Russians	11,791	0.82%	11,604	1.77%	187	0.03%	
Kazakhs	1,793	0.12%	956	0.14%	837	0.11%	
Tatars	1,653	0.12%	1,616	0.25%	37	0.00%	
Azerbaijanis	938	0.06%	773	0.12%	165	0.02%	
Balochi	500	0.03%	494	0.07%	6	0.00%	
Armenians	397	0.03%	386	0.06%	11	0.00%	
Ukrainians	297	0.02%	286	0.04%	11	0.00%	
Koreans	168	0.01%	164	0.02%	4	0.00%	
Persians	131	0.01%	107	0.02%	24	0.00%	
Lezgins	102	0.01%	102	0.02%	−	−	
Afghans	99	0.01%	99	0.02%	−	−	
Karakalpaks	15	0.00%	13	0.00%	2	0.00%	
Kurds	12	0.00%	10	0.00%	2	0.00%	
other nationalities	723	0.05%	655	0.10%	68	0.01%	
Total	1,446,282	100%	1,292,024	100%	154,258	100%	

== Administrative divisions ==
As of 2021, according to the official website of the regional government, Lebap Region included one city with status equivalent to a district, 10 districts, 14 cities "in the district" (Turkmen: etrapdaky), 24 towns, 105 rural councils, and 429 villages.

=== Districts ===
As of 9 November 2022 Lebap Region (Turkmen: Lebap welaýaty) is subdivided into eight districts (etrap, plural etraplar):

- Çarjew (formerly Serdarabat)
- Darganata (formerly Birata)
- Dänew (formerly Galkynyş)
- Halaç
- Hojambaz
- Kerki (formerly Atamyrat)
- Köýtendag (formerly Çarşaňňy)
- Saýat

In November 2017 four districts, (Beýik Türkmenbaşy, Garaşsyzlyk, Garabekwül, and Sakar), were abolished and their territories absorbed by other districts. In November 2022 another two districts, Döwletli and Farap, were similarly abolished.

=== Municipalities ===
As of January 1, 2017, the region included 15 cities (Turkmen: şäherler, Russian: города), 23 towns (Turkmen: şäherçeler, Russian: посёлки), 106 rural or village councils (Turkmen: geňeşlikler, Russian: сельские советы), and 430 villages (Turkmen: obalar, Russian: сёла, or Russian: сельские населенные пункты).

In the list below, the lone city with "district status" is bolded:

- Dänew (formerly Galkynyş)
- Darganata (formerly Birata)
- Dostluk (formerly Yuzhnyy)
- Farap
- Garabekewül
- Gazojak
- Halaç
- Hojambaz
- Kerki (formerly Atamyrat)
- Köýtendag (formerly Çarşaňňy)
- Magdanly (formerly Gowurdak)
- Sakar
- Saýat
- Seýdi (formerly Neftezavodsk)
- **Türkmenabat** (formerly Çärjew)

== Economy ==
=== Agriculture ===
Crop production in Lebap is heavily dependent on irrigation from the Amu Darya. Fields are cultivated when one-and-a-half to two meters above the floodplains of the river, primarily cereal grains and cotton.

Lebap Region: area and production of selected crops, 2017-2019
	area, thousand hectares			production, thousand tonnes		
	2017	2018	2019	2017	2018	2019
Cereals and legumes	191.1	172.5	174.5	428.0	274.9	428.7
Cotton	120.0	120.0	120.0	302.3	301.6	307.4
Vegetables	13.0	13.8	14.9	183.3	193.4	211.3

=== Extraction industries ===
Lebap is rich in various natural resources, most notably, natural gas. The region is home to the Malai Gas Field and the Bagtyýarlyk Gas Field, which both serve as major suppliers of natural gas to China.

The Garlyk Mining and Enrichment Amalgamate in Köýtendag District produces potash fertilizer, and the Seýdi Oil Refinery is one of two petroleum refineries in Turkmenistan.

From antiquity, local residents quarried sulfur, zinc and lead in the Köýtendag (Kungitang) foothills for domestic needs, including casting of bullets. During the Soviet period, a lead mine was dug and the town of Svintsovyy Rudnik was founded.

=== Construction materials ===
The Lebap Cement Plant in Turkmenabat has a design capacity of one million tons per year. Polimeks built it in 2012. In 2020, construction of a second plant, in Köýtendag District, also with a design capacity of one million tons, got underway.

=== Power generation ===
The Zerger power plant under construction by Sumitomo, Mitsubishi, Hitachi, and Rönesans Holding in Çärjew District will have a design capacity of 432 megawatts. It is primarily intended for export of electricity. The Zerger plant will use natural gas from the Üçajy Gas Field (Russian: Учаджинскоe газодобывающеe месторождениe), delivered via a 125-km high-pressure pipeline.

Lebap Region: Production of selected industrial and processed goods, 2017-2019
	2017	2018	2019
Electricity, million kwh	2,144.1	2,003.9	1,820.7
Natural gas, billion m^{3}	27.8	24.8	23.0
Oil (including gas condensate), thousand tonnes	595.9	567.8	581.9
Gasoline, thousand tonnes	215.0	218.5	221.8
Diesel fuel, thousand tonnes	173	190	162
Bunker oil, thousand tonnes	76	-	90
Mineral fertilizers, NPK basis, thousand tonnes	30.2	46.1	51.1
Cement, thousand tonnes	861.9	935.6	857.3
Bricks, million	217.3	256.0	269.9
Cotton lint, thousand tonnes	86.2	41.0	107.1
Raw silk, tonnes	83	74	81
Cotton yarn. thousand tonnes	21.8	22.4	22.7
Silk textiles, million m^{2}	0.5	0.4	0.4
Cotton textiles, million m^{2}	8.5	8.3	11.6
Unwoven fabric, thousand m^{2}	9,173	-	-

== Nature preserves and reservations ==
- Amudarya State Nature Reserve
- Köýtendag Nature Reserve
- Repetek Biosphere State Reserve

== Tourist attractions ==
- Aýrybaba
- Dayahatyn caravansaray (in use 9th to 16th centuries)
- Dinosaur Plateau

== See also ==
- OpenStreetMap Wiki: Lebap Province
- OpenStreetMap Wiki: Districts in Turkmenistan
