= List of cities, towns and villages in Turkmenistan =

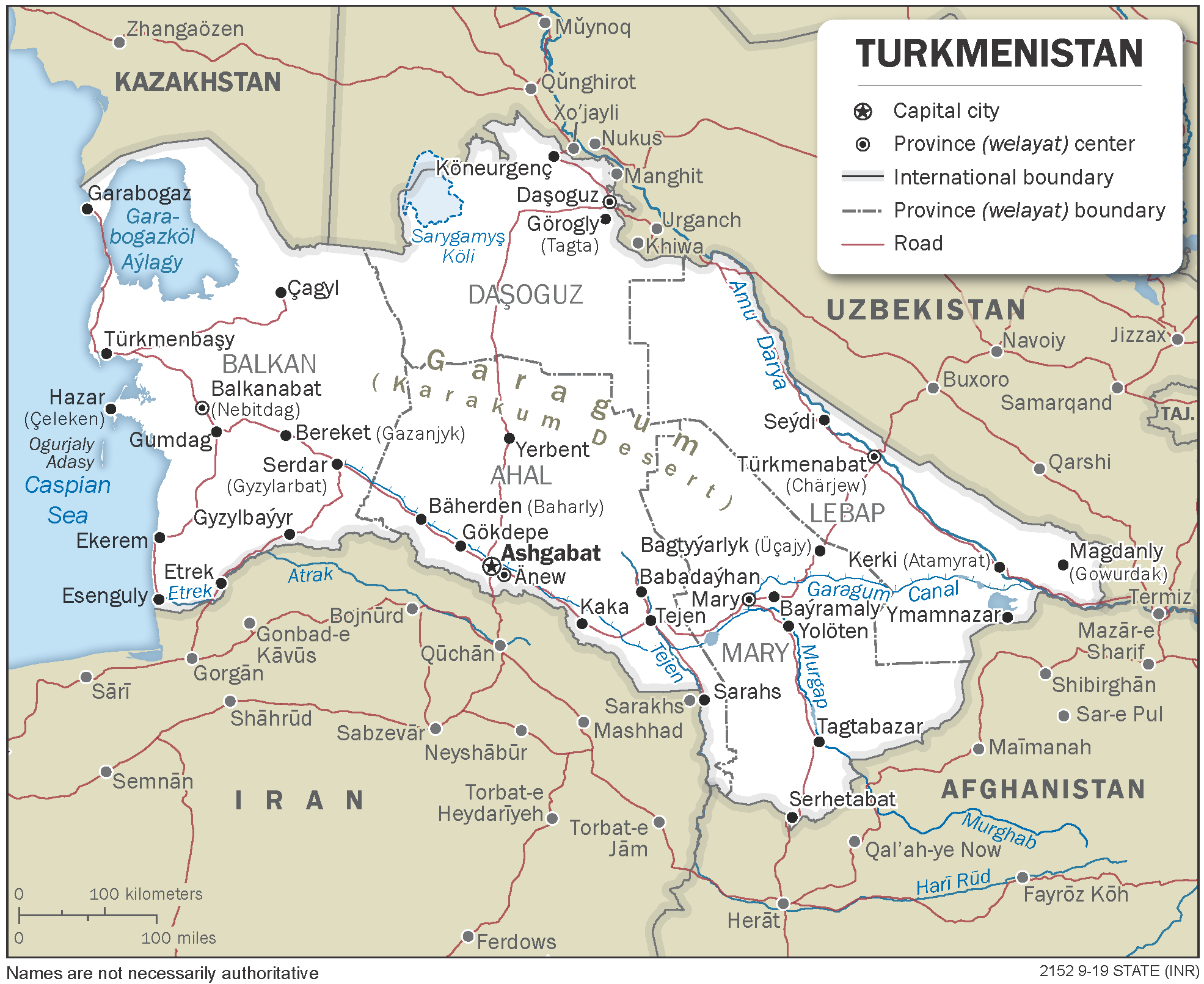
A map of Turkmenistan.

This article is referencing as a list all lawfully recognized municipalities of Turkmenistan. Since 19 September 2025, there are 1,822 municipalities in Turkmenistan, including seven cities with district status, 44 cities, 71 towns, 1,692 villages, and the capital city, Aşgabat.

In Turkmenistan, any administrative division, including municipalities, is designated by law and may be changed by decree by the Assembly of Turkmenistan, as stated by the 23rd article of the constitution. They all are referenced in a list rarely shared by the Turkmen government, yet available for consultation through the 2022 census.

Criticized by external observers, the census figures should be taken very carefully as they seem to overestimate the actual population of the country.

== List ==
Municipalities listed here are sorted by their administrative division, then by alphabetical order.

Municipalities annotated with C are cities, T are towns, and G are villages holding the seat of a rural council.

Name	Note	Population (2022)	District	Included in
Änew	C	28,653	Ak bugdaý	Änew
Bereket	G	10,597	Ak bugdaý	Bereket geňeşligi
Borjakly		233	Ak bugdaý	Bereketli geňeşligi
Bükri	G	1,393	Ak bugdaý	Bereketli geňeşligi
Diňli		666	Ak bugdaý	Bereketli geňeşligi
Gamyşly		302	Ak bugdaý	Bereketli geňeşligi
Gyzyltakyr		269	Ak bugdaý	Bereketli geňeşligi
Kükürtli		212	Ak bugdaý	Bereketli geňeşligi
Sakarçäge		432	Ak bugdaý	Bereketli geňeşligi
Sözenli		278	Ak bugdaý	Bereketli geňeşligi
Bereketli zaman	T	1,429	Ak bugdaý	Bereketli zaman
Gäwers		3,396	Ak bugdaý	Bereketli zaman
Gäwers bekedi		835	Ak bugdaý	Bereketli zaman
Berkarar	T	2,747	Ak bugdaý	Berkarar
Bokurdak	T	7,726	Ak bugdaý	Bokurdak
Bussy		201	Ak bugdaý	Bokurdak
Çalyş		878	Ak bugdaý	Bokurdak
Çürçüri		876	Ak bugdaý	Bokurdak
Dawaly		261	Ak bugdaý	Bokurdak
Düýeli		99	Ak bugdaý	Bokurdak
Garaberdi		33	Ak bugdaý	Bokurdak
Gargalaňdiňlisi		270	Ak bugdaý	Bokurdak
Garryçyrla		404	Ak bugdaý	Bokurdak
Garryja		274	Ak bugdaý	Bokurdak
Gazykly		226	Ak bugdaý	Bokurdak
Goşalar		23	Ak bugdaý	Bokurdak
Gowşakgyzyltakyr		430	Ak bugdaý	Bokurdak
Göbekli		60	Ak bugdaý	Bokurdak
Gujurly		125	Ak bugdaý	Bokurdak
Güneşli		52	Ak bugdaý	Bokurdak
Gyzylsakal		426	Ak bugdaý	Bokurdak
Hajyguly		75	Ak bugdaý	Bokurdak
Kelleli		110	Ak bugdaý	Bokurdak
Kerpiçli		7	Ak bugdaý	Bokurdak
Mollagurban		268	Ak bugdaý	Bokurdak
Oraz		404	Ak bugdaý	Bokurdak
Oýukly		194	Ak bugdaý	Bokurdak
Töwekgel		127	Ak bugdaý	Bokurdak
Ýerbent		2,561	Ak bugdaý	Bokurdak
Bugdaýly	G	2,479	Ak bugdaý	Bugdaýly geňeşligi
Saryk		1,017	Ak bugdaý	Bugdaýly geňeşligi
Tokaý hojalygy		331	Ak bugdaý	Bugdaýly geňeşligi
Mekan	G	2,178	Ak bugdaý	Burunojar geňeşligi
Gämi	G	18,148	Ak bugdaý	Gämi geňeşligi
Ýeketut		568	Ak bugdaý	Gämi geňeşligi
Garagum	G	1,492	Ak bugdaý	Garagum geňeşligi
Magtymguly	G	9,173	Ak bugdaý	Magtymguly adyndaky geňeşlik
Döwletli mekan	G		Ak bugdaý	Öňaldy geňeşligi
Gaplaň		252	Ak bugdaý	Öňaldy geňeşligi
Garadamak		183	Ak bugdaý	Öňaldy geňeşligi
Kepele			Ak bugdaý	Öňaldy geňeşligi
Kesikburun		154	Ak bugdaý	Öňaldy geňeşligi
Körçaý		249	Ak bugdaý	Öňaldy geňeşligi
Narly		200	Ak bugdaý	Öňaldy geňeşligi
Nazarly		762	Ak bugdaý	Öňaldy geňeşligi
Öňaldy		2,502	Ak bugdaý	Öňaldy geňeşligi
Toraňňyly, Ak bugdaý		686	Ak bugdaý	Öňaldy geňeşligi
Tozanly		782	Ak bugdaý	Öňaldy geňeşligi
Parahat	G	4,594	Ak bugdaý	Parahat geňeşligi
Bozköl		94	Ak bugdaý	Sähra geňeşligi
Çörli		386	Ak bugdaý	Sähra geňeşligi
Derýa		763	Ak bugdaý	Sähra geňeşligi
Gulangyrlan		912	Ak bugdaý	Sähra geňeşligi
Gypjak		74	Ak bugdaý	Sähra geňeşligi
Gysy		450	Ak bugdaý	Sähra geňeşligi
Sähra	G	791	Ak bugdaý	Sähra geňeşligi
Syzaly		63	Ak bugdaý	Sähra geňeşligi
Täzeoba		977	Ak bugdaý	Sähra geňeşligi
87-nji duralga		54	Ak bugdaý	Täzedurmuş geňeşligi
88-nji duralga		63	Ak bugdaý	Täzedurmuş geňeşligi
Garanur		214	Ak bugdaý	Täzedurmuş geňeşligi
Giňoý		62	Ak bugdaý	Täzedurmuş geňeşligi
Gyzylgöz		406	Ak bugdaý	Täzedurmuş geňeşligi
Söwütli		357	Ak bugdaý	Täzedurmuş geňeşligi
Täzedurmuş	G	6,945	Ak bugdaý	Täzedurmuş geňeşligi
Aksuw		474	Ak bugdaý	Ýaşlyk
Akýaýla		1,337	Ak bugdaý	Ýaşlyk
Balykçy		1,241	Ak bugdaý	Ýaşlyk
Ýaşlyk	T	8,172	Ak bugdaý	Ýaşlyk
Ýaşlyk bekedi		419	Ak bugdaý	Ýaşlyk
Ýaşyldepe	G	6,563	Ak bugdaý	Ýaşyldepe geňeşligi
Ak altyn		593	Altyn asyr	Altyn asyr
Altyn asyr	C	13,660	Altyn asyr	Altyn asyr
Bugdaýly		448	Altyn asyr	Altyn asyr
Maldarçylyk		364	Altyn asyr	Altyn asyr
Balykçy		363	Altyn asyr	Balykçylyk geňeşligi
Çäçe	G	5,067	Altyn asyr	Çäçe geňeşligi
Döwletli	G	8,162	Altyn asyr	Döwletli geňeşligi
Göksüýri		192	Altyn asyr	Döwletli geňeşligi
Däneçilik		420	Altyn asyr	Gurban Durdy adyndaky geňeşlik
Galkynyş		520	Altyn asyr	Gurban Durdy adyndaky geňeşlik
Gurban Durdy	G	2,245	Altyn asyr	Gurban Durdy adyndaky geňeşlik
Mäne	G	4,877	Altyn asyr	Mäne geňeşligi
Lukman		781	Altyn asyr	Waharman geňeşligi
Waharman	G	1,877	Altyn asyr	Waharman geňeşligi
Aba Annaýew	T		Altyn asyr	Arkadag
Arkadag	C	567	Altyn asyr	Arkadag
Ak altyn	G	8,936	Babadaýhan	Ak altyn geňeşligi
Akwekil	G	16,946	Babadaýhan	Akwekil geňeşligi
Çili		962	Babadaýhan	Akwekil geňeşligi
Babadaýhan	C	13,440	Babadaýhan	Babadaýhan
Garawekil	G	345	Babadaýhan	Garawekil geňeşligi
Garajaowlak		17,229	Babadaýhan	Garawekil geňeşligi
Hasyl	G	6,886	Babadaýhan	Hasyl geňeşligi
Götin		1,156	Babadaýhan	Täzeýol geňeşligi
Täzeýol	G	9,259	Babadaýhan	Täzeýol geňeşligi
Ýarygökje	G	9,897	Babadaýhan	Ýarygökje geňeşligi
Alty Garlyýew		972	Babadaýhan	Zähmet geňeşligi
Mamur		10,571	Babadaýhan	Zähmet geňeşligi
Zähmet	G	713	Babadaýhan	Zähmet geňeşligi
97-nji duralga		178	Bäherden	Akdepe geňeşligi
Akdepe	G	9,066	Bäherden	Akdepe geňeşligi
Arçman	T	6,014	Bäherden	Arçman
Arçman bekedi		1,860	Bäherden	Arçman
Keletdag		373	Bäherden	Arçman
Bäherden	C	37,588	Bäherden	Bäherden
Bamy	G	7,884	Bäherden	Bamy geňeşligi
Ymarat		658	Bäherden	Bamy geňeşligi
Börme	G	5,288	Bäherden	Börme geňeşligi
103-nji duralga		324	Bäherden	Börme geňeşligi
Döwgala	G	4,482	Bäherden	Döwgala geňeşligi
Durun	G	10,967	Bäherden	Durun geňeşligi
Garagan	G	5,788	Bäherden	Garagan geňeşligi
Garawul	G	8,235	Bäherden	Garawul geňeşligi
Könegümmez		1,064	Bäherden	Garawul geňeşligi
Atabeg		641	Bäherden	Kirpili geňeşligi
Hajyölen		143	Bäherden	Kirpili geňeşligi
Kirpili	G	1,322	Bäherden	Kirpili geňeşligi
Sözenlioýy		207	Bäherden	Kirpili geňeşligi
Mürçe	G	5,056	Bäherden	Mürçe geňeşligi
Etegoýy		79	Bäherden	Mürçe geňeşligi
Tagyoýy		76	Bäherden	Mürçe geňeşligi
Nohur	G	6,258	Bäherden	Nohur geňeşligi
Deşt		677	Bäherden	Saýwan geňeşligi
Saýwan	G	1,628	Bäherden	Saýwan geňeşligi
100-nji duralga		134	Bäherden	Sünçe geňeşligi
Sünçe	G	1,785	Bäherden	Sünçe geňeşligi
Kelete		2,582	Bäherden	Ýarajy geňeşligi
Ýarajy	G	6,052	Bäherden	Ýarajy geňeşligi
Ahal	G	16,025	Gökdepe	Ahal geňeşligi
Çyrla		96	Gökdepe	Ahal geňeşligi
Gatydüýp		233	Gökdepe	Ahal geňeşligi
Gorýa		70	Gökdepe	Ahal geňeşligi
Goşatakyr		58	Gökdepe	Ahal geňeşligi
Gutlyaýak		308	Gökdepe	Ahal geňeşligi
Ilek		136	Gökdepe	Ahal geňeşligi
Syplaňgyzyltakyr		104	Gökdepe	Ahal geňeşligi
War		63	Gökdepe	Ahal geňeşligi
Akgoňur	G	5,375	Gökdepe	Akgoňur geňeşligi
Babaarap	G	9,681	Gökdepe	Babaarap geňeşligi
Ataguýy		1,370	Gökdepe	Derweze geňeşligi
Böri		1,548	Gökdepe	Derweze geňeşligi
Derweze	G	2,166	Gökdepe	Derweze geňeşligi
Gökdepe	C	33,381	Gökdepe	Gökdepe
Hurmantgökje		9,302	Gökdepe	Hurmantgökje geňeşligi
Keleje	G	7,260	Gökdepe	Keleje geňeşligi
Bowga		4,094	Gökdepe	Köpetdag geňeşligi
Bükri		2,316	Gökdepe	Köpetdag geňeşligi
Köpetdagyň ýalkymy	G		Gökdepe	Köpetdag geňeşligi
Nowata		892	Gökdepe	Köpetdag geňeşligi
Artykhoja		553	Gökdepe	Owadandepe geňeşligi
Nedir		1,396	Gökdepe	Owadandepe geňeşligi
Nurly zaman	G		Gökdepe	Owadandepe geňeşligi
Orazow		3,777	Gökdepe	Owadandepe geňeşligi
Sähra		129	Gökdepe	Owadandepe geňeşligi
Şapy		97	Gökdepe	Owadandepe geňeşligi
Talhanly		1,525	Gökdepe	Owadandepe geňeşligi
Ýandakly		159	Gökdepe	Owadandepe geňeşligi
Ajykäriz		1,239	Gökdepe	S.A. Nyýazow adyndaky geňeşlik
Galkynyş		108	Gökdepe	S.A. Nyýazow adyndaky geňeşlik
Garrykäriz		2,145	Gökdepe	S.A. Nyýazow adyndaky geňeşlik
S.A. Nyýazow	G	5,530	Gökdepe	S.A. Nyýazow adyndaky geňeşlik
Şorgala	G	4,432	Gökdepe	Şorgala geňeşligi
Gökdepe	G	9,150	Gökdepe	Tagan Baýramdurdyýew adyndaky geňeşlik
Täze eýýam	G	5,196	Gökdepe	Täze eýýam geňeşligi
Goňurajy		41	Gökdepe	Türkmenistan geňeşligi
Orazsähet		89	Gökdepe	Türkmenistan geňeşligi
Türkmenistan	G	7,666	Gökdepe	Türkmenistan geňeşligi
Şähridag		318	Gökdepe	Ýaňgala geňeşligi
Sekizýap		1,005	Gökdepe	Ýaňgala geňeşligi
Ýaňgala	G	8,657	Gökdepe	Ýaňgala geňeşligi
Çaran		370	Gökdepe	Yzgant
Garaajy		364	Gökdepe	Yzgant
Mämmetýar		1,184	Gökdepe	Yzgant
Sowma		324	Gökdepe	Yzgant
Yzgant	T	6,547	Gökdepe	Yzgant
Arapgala		4,125	Kaka	Arapgala geňeşligi
Artyk		2,466	Kaka	Artyk geňeşligi
Duşak	T	8,405	Kaka	Duşak
Şükür bagşy		12,136	Kaka	Duşak
Garahan	G	1,832	Kaka	Garahan geňeşligi
Bagtly zamana	G		Kaka	Gowşut geňeşligi
Gowşut		7,881	Kaka	Gowşut geňeşligi
Gowşut bekedi		822	Kaka	Gowşut geňeşligi
Gozgan	G	2,749	Kaka	Gozgan geňeşligi
Harçiňňan	G	1,412	Kaka	Harçiňňan geňeşligi
Hywaabat		444	Kaka	Kaka
Kaka	C	33,315	Kaka	Kaka
Kürengala	G	1,587	Kaka	Kürengala geňeşligi
Soltandeşt		854	Kaka	Kürengala geňeşligi
Bükriölen		17	Kaka	Mehinli geňeşligi
Bulanyk		105	Kaka	Mehinli geňeşligi
Haşşan			Kaka	Mehinli geňeşligi
Hojameňli		101	Kaka	Mehinli geňeşligi
Hümmetli		30	Kaka	Mehinli geňeşligi
Köpguýy		150	Kaka	Mehinli geňeşligi
Kümeli		113	Kaka	Mehinli geňeşligi
Kyrkguýy		75	Kaka	Mehinli geňeşligi
Mehinli	G	5,089	Kaka	Mehinli geňeşligi
Alam	G	2,169	Sarahs	Alam geňeşligi
Aşgabat	G	4,470	Sarahs	Aşgabat geňeşligi
Ata	G	3,701	Sarahs	Ata geňeşligi
Gökhan	G	2,635	Sarahs	Bagtyýarlyk geňeşligi
Watan		443	Sarahs	Bagtyýarlyk geňeşligi
Zähmet		179	Sarahs	Bagtyýarlyk geňeşligi
Çalja		701	Sarahs	Galkynyş geňeşligi
Galkynyş	G	1,988	Sarahs	Galkynyş geňeşligi
Gözli ata		52	Sarahs	Galkynyş geňeşligi
Salyr		3,663	Sarahs	Galkynyş geňeşligi
Tekehan		1,175	Sarahs	Galkynyş geňeşligi
Gaňňaly	T	3,580	Sarahs	Gaňňaly
Hanýap	G	2,282	Sarahs	Hanýap geňeşligi
Agzybirlik	G	3,813	Sarahs	Kiçiaga geňeşligi
Berkarar		4,675	Sarahs	Kiçiaga geňeşligi
Oraz salyr		1,194	Sarahs	Kiçiaga geňeşligi
Rysgally		3,681	Sarahs	Kiçiaga geňeşligi
Ak altyn		2,837	Sarahs	Parahatçylyk geňeşligi
Parahatçylyk	G	2,229	Sarahs	Parahatçylyk geňeşligi
Ýeňiş		366	Sarahs	Parahatçylyk geňeşligi
Sarahs	C	31,269	Sarahs	Sarahs
Ýalawaç	G	3,541	Sarahs	Ýalawaç geňeşligi
Adalat	G	320	Tejen	Adalat geňeşligi
Ajyköl		416	Tejen	Adalat geňeşligi
Akmolla		467	Tejen	Adalat geňeşligi
Böwrideşik		214	Tejen	Adalat geňeşligi
Mürzeçyrla		390	Tejen	Adalat geňeşligi
Ezizhan	G	9,023	Tejen	Agalaň geňeşligi
Babadaýhan	G	8,070	Tejen	Babadaýhan geňeşligi
Bagtyýarlyk	T	9,804	Tejen	Bagtyýarlyk
Berdi Kerbabaýew	G	4,576	Tejen	Berdi Kerbabaýew adyndaky geňeşlik
Birleşik	G	8,092	Tejen	Birleşik geňeşligi
Bitaraplyk	G	7,180	Tejen	Bitaraplyk geňeşligi
Gowkyzereň pagta bazasy		1,065	Tejen	Bitaraplyk geňeşligi
74-nji duralga		106	Tejen	Garaşsyzlyk geňeşligi
Garaşsyzlyk	G	8,673	Tejen	Garaşsyzlyk geňeşligi
Takyr		293	Tejen	Garaşsyzlyk geňeşligi
Garryçyrla	G	7,405	Tejen	Garryçyrla geňeşligi
Göniamaşa	G	7,046	Tejen	Göniamaşa geňeşligi
Täzeoba	G	8,614	Tejen	Täzeoba geňeşligi
Tejen	C	67,488	Tejen	Tejen
Seleňli		1,326	Tejen	Zaman geňeşligi
Serdar		633	Tejen	Zaman geňeşligi
Zaman	G	1,498	Tejen	Zaman geňeşligi
Aşgabat	C	1,030,063		Aşgabat
Balkanabat	C	123,190	Balkanabat	Balkanabat
Gumdag	T	30,884	Balkanabat	Gumdag
Garagöl		765	Balkanabat	Hazar
Hazar	T	14,671	Balkanabat	Hazar
123-nji duralga		155	Balkanabat	Jebel
Jebel	T	15,056	Balkanabat	Jebel
Mollagara		492	Balkanabat	Jebel
Zähmet		113	Balkanabat	Jebel
Oglanly		658	Balkanabat	Oglanly
Oglanly	T	1,715	Balkanabat	Oglanly
Uzboý	T	730	Balkanabat	Uzboý
Bereket	C	23,697	Bereket	Bereket
Galkynyş	T		Bereket	Galkynyş
Gamakly		159	Bereket	Galkynyş
Gulmaç		1,998	Bereket	Galkynyş
Isgender		858	Bereket	Galkynyş
Ok		590	Bereket	Galkynyş
Öýleguşluk		513	Bereket	Galkynyş
Akjaguýma		119	Bereket	Oboý geňeşligi
Arkaç		383	Bereket	Oboý geňeşligi
Aýdyň		1,513	Bereket	Oboý geňeşligi
Çitli		230	Bereket	Oboý geňeşligi
Däneata		96	Bereket	Oboý geňeşligi
Oboý	G	1,890	Bereket	Oboý geňeşligi
Magtymguly		351	Bereket	S.A. Nyýazow adyndaky geňeşlik
Uzynsuw	G	1,676	Bereket	S.A. Nyýazow adyndaky geňeşlik
Uzynsuw bekedi		483	Bereket	S.A. Nyýazow adyndaky geňeşlik
Türkmenistan		351	Bereket	S.A. Nyýazow adyndaky geňeşlik
Ajyguýy		536	Bereket	Ýasga geňeşligi
Burgun		676	Bereket	Ýasga geňeşligi
Düwünçi		532	Bereket	Ýasga geňeşligi
Garaýylgyn		79	Bereket	Ýasga geňeşligi
Jemal		331	Bereket	Ýasga geňeşligi
Kiçijikýazy		63	Bereket	Ýasga geňeşligi
Ýasga	G	1,460	Bereket	Ýasga geňeşligi
Ajyýap	G	4,042	Esenguly	Ajyýap geňeşligi
Alaňňyrtly		179	Esenguly	Bugdaýly geňeşligi
Balguýy		304	Esenguly	Bugdaýly geňeşligi
Bugdaýly	G	3,041	Esenguly	Bugdaýly geňeşligi
Gögerendag		1,679	Esenguly	Bugdaýly geňeşligi
Orunçäge		467	Esenguly	Bugdaýly geňeşligi
Şahman		1,411	Esenguly	Bugdaýly geňeşligi
Yňdarlan		91	Esenguly	Bugdaýly geňeşligi
Çaloýyk	G	1,989	Esenguly	Çaloýyk geňeşligi
Bazarly		188	Esenguly	Çekişler geňeşligi
Çekişler	G	2,213	Esenguly	Çekişler geňeşligi
Ekerem	T	3,972	Esenguly	Ekerem
Gamyşlyja		2,086	Esenguly	Ekerem
Garadegiş	G	1,840	Esenguly	Garadegiş geňeşligi
Garadepe	T	9,016	Esenguly	Garadepe
Esenguly	C	12,918	Esenguly	Esenguly
Akýaýla	G	1,163	Etrek	Akýaýla geňeşligi
Çetli		364	Etrek	Akýaýla geňeşligi
Güdürolum		529	Etrek	Akýaýla geňeşligi
Garaagaç	G	615	Etrek	Garaagaç geňeşligi
Gyzylbaýyr	G	3,516	Etrek	Gyzylbaýyr geňeşligi
Etrek	C	12,508	Etrek	Etrek
Madaw	G	5,052	Etrek	Madaw geňeşligi
Çerkezli		1,150	Gyzylarbat	Arkaç geňeşligi
Garabogaz		2,836	Gyzylarbat	Arkaç geňeşligi
Melegoç		136	Gyzylarbat	Arkaç geňeşligi
Rowaç	G	1,084	Gyzylarbat	Arkaç geňeşligi
Tutly		2,094	Gyzylarbat	Arkaç geňeşligi
Ýalkym		254	Gyzylarbat	Arkaç geňeşligi
Ýylgynly		109	Gyzylarbat	Arkaç geňeşligi
Azady	G	924	Gyzylarbat	Azady adyndaky geňeşlik
Hasar		377	Gyzylarbat	Azady adyndaky geňeşlik
Sarp		369	Gyzylarbat	Azady adyndaky geňeşlik
Şatlyk		377	Gyzylarbat	Azady adyndaky geňeşlik
Ýaşlyk		379	Gyzylarbat	Azady adyndaky geňeşlik
Goç	G	1,579	Gyzylarbat	Goç geňeşligi
Goç bekedi		486	Gyzylarbat	Goç geňeşligi
Parahat		236	Gyzylarbat	Goç geňeşligi
Zaw		532	Gyzylarbat	Goç geňeşligi
Zaw bekedi		136	Gyzylarbat	Goç geňeşligi
Gyzylarbat	C	48,558	Gyzylarbat	Gyzylarbat
Bendesen		1,269	Gyzylarbat	Hasar geňeşligi
Çukur	G	915	Gyzylarbat	Hasar geňeşligi
Jejirs		180	Gyzylarbat	Hasar geňeşligi
Hojagala	G	1,917	Gyzylarbat	Hojagala geňeşligi
Arkaç		186	Gyzylarbat	Janahyr
Janahyr	T	3,664	Gyzylarbat	Janahyr
Janahyr bekedi		346	Gyzylarbat	Paraw geňeşligi
Paraw	G	1,070	Gyzylarbat	Paraw geňeşligi
Purnuwar	G	1,652	Gyzylarbat	Purnuwar geňeşligi
Ak	G	918	Magtymguly	Çendir geňeşligi
Gyzylymam		1,396	Magtymguly	Çendir geňeşligi
Ýartygala		957	Magtymguly	Çendir geňeşligi
Gargyly		629	Magtymguly	Daghojagala geňeşligi
Hojagala	G	740	Magtymguly	Daghojagala geňeşligi
Daýna	G	1,161	Magtymguly	Daýna geňeşligi
Arapata		118	Magtymguly	Gerkez geňeşligi
Arapjyk		382	Magtymguly	Gerkez geňeşligi
Magtymgala		422	Magtymguly	Gerkez geňeşligi
Uzyntokaý		108	Magtymguly	Gerkez geňeşligi
Ýuwangala	G	1,286	Magtymguly	Gerkez geňeşligi
Çukurýurt		542	Magtymguly	Könekesir geňeşligi
Könekesir	G	2,846	Magtymguly	Könekesir geňeşligi
Aýdere		154	Magtymguly	Kürüždeý geňeşligi
Durdyhan		556	Magtymguly	Kürüždeý geňeşligi
Duzlydepe		778	Magtymguly	Kürüždeý geňeşligi
Kürüždeý	G	1,108	Magtymguly	Kürüždeý geňeşligi
Tutlygala		1,088	Magtymguly	Kürüždeý geňeşligi
Gyzyl		373	Magtymguly	Magtymguly
Magtymguly	C	15,386	Magtymguly	Magtymguly
Garakel		941	Magtymguly	Ýankel geňeşligi
Näre		605	Magtymguly	Ýankel geňeşligi
Sakgar		1,268	Magtymguly	Ýankel geňeşligi
Ýankel	G	902	Magtymguly	Ýankel geňeşligi
Akdaş	T	6,750	Türkmenbaşy	Akdaş
Garaşsyzlyk		211	Türkmenbaşy	Akdaş
Akguýy	G	389	Türkmenbaşy	Akguýy geňeşligi
Goşaoba		130	Türkmenbaşy	Akguýy geňeşligi
Gürje		480	Türkmenbaşy	Akguýy geňeşligi
Hudaýberdi		575	Türkmenbaşy	Akguýy geňeşligi
Irikli		277	Türkmenbaşy	Akguýy geňeşligi
Soýli		25	Türkmenbaşy	Akguýy geňeşligi
Ybyk		385	Türkmenbaşy	Akguýy geňeşligi
126-njy duralga		93	Türkmenbaşy	Belek
129-njy duralga		104	Türkmenbaşy	Belek
Belek	T	1,720	Türkmenbaşy	Belek
Garateňir		114	Türkmenbaşy	Belek
Awlamyş		189	Türkmenbaşy	Çagyl geňeşligi
Çagyl	G	808	Türkmenbaşy	Çagyl geňeşligi
Tüwer		222	Türkmenbaşy	Çagyl geňeşligi
Garabogaz	C	7,877	Türkmenbaşy	Garabogaz
Garaaýman		118	Türkmenbaşy	Goýmat geňeşligi
Gökdere		513	Türkmenbaşy	Goýmat geňeşligi
Goýmat	G	427	Türkmenbaşy	Goýmat geňeşligi
Türkmenbaşy	C	91,745	Türkmenbaşy	Türkmenbaşy
Guwlymaýak	T	1,853	Türkmenbaşy	Guwlymaýak
Gyzylgaýa	T	993	Türkmenbaşy	Gyzylgaýa
Gyzylsuw	T	859	Türkmenbaşy	Gyzylsuw
Hasan		508	Türkmenbaşy	Türkmenbaşy
Sülmen		195	Türkmenbaşy	Türkmenbaşy
Türkmenbaşy	T	7,334	Türkmenbaşy	Türkmenbaşy
Ýaňyajy		970	Türkmenbaşy	Türkmenbaşy
Allaýaroý	G	2,504	Akdepe	Agöýli geňeşligi
Galaýer		2,418	Akdepe	Agöýli geňeşligi
Küle		872	Akdepe	Agöýli geňeşligi
Üzümbag		1,979	Akdepe	Agöýli geňeşligi
Magtymoý	G	2,807	Akdepe	Ak bugdaý geňeşligi
Akdepe	C	28,045	Akdepe	Akdepe
Çoçun		1,418	Akdepe	Akdepe geňeşligi
Gyzanýap		1,393	Akdepe	Akdepe geňeşligi
Ýeke derek		975	Akdepe	Akdepe geňeşligi
Zähmet	G	1,271	Akdepe	Akdepe geňeşligi
Bereketli		1,549	Akdepe	Atçapan geňeşligi
Gyzylýap	G	2,260	Akdepe	Atçapan geňeşligi
Magtymguly		1,150	Akdepe	Atçapan geňeşligi
Alilioý	G	3,499	Akdepe	Döwletmämmet Azady adyndaky geňeşlik
Keýigoý		2,246	Akdepe	Döwletmämmet Azady adyndaky geňeşlik
Derekli	G	5,269	Akdepe	Gorkut geňeşligi
Alili		3,140	Akdepe	Magtymguly Garlyýew adyndaky geňeşlik
Arap	G	1,785	Akdepe	Magtymguly Garlyýew adyndaky geňeşlik
Jerenli		2,543	Akdepe	Magtymguly Garlyýew adyndaky geňeşlik
Polatly		1,833	Akdepe	Magtymguly Garlyýew adyndaky geňeşlik
Ussaly		3,039	Akdepe	Magtymguly Garlyýew adyndaky geňeşlik
Ýekeagaç		1,762	Akdepe	Magtymguly Garlyýew adyndaky geňeşlik
Akgaş		543	Akdepe	Mollanepes adyndaky geňeşlik
Atçapan		1,512	Akdepe	Mollanepes adyndaky geňeşlik
Garaja		1,592	Akdepe	Mollanepes adyndaky geňeşlik
Garataýly		2,053	Akdepe	Mollanepes adyndaky geňeşlik
Göwdük		1,228	Akdepe	Mollanepes adyndaky geňeşlik
Täzedurmuş		1,953	Akdepe	Mollanepes adyndaky geňeşlik
Täzemekan		359	Akdepe	Mollanepes adyndaky geňeşlik
Tekebeg		646	Akdepe	Mollanepes adyndaky geňeşlik
Toýnuk		1,051	Akdepe	Mollanepes adyndaky geňeşlik
Watan	G	2,919	Akdepe	Mollanepes adyndaky geňeşlik
Bereket		5,501	Akdepe	Nowruz geňeşligi
Darylyoý		1,154	Akdepe	Nowruz geňeşligi
Şasenem		109	Akdepe	Nowruz geňeşligi
Sekizatlyk	G	5,270	Akdepe	Nowruz geňeşligi
Ýekesöwüt		2,347	Akdepe	Nowruz geňeşligi
Baglyk		2,809	Akdepe	Orazgeldi Ärsaryýew
Garaboýnak		2,805	Akdepe	Orazgeldi Ärsaryýew
Gasymhowly		2,588	Akdepe	Orazgeldi Ärsaryýew
Jemşidi		4,579	Akdepe	Orazgeldi Ärsaryýew
Orazgeldi Ärsaryýew	T	8,040	Akdepe	Orazgeldi Ärsaryýew
Agzybirlik		731	Akdepe	Pagtaçylyk geňeşligi
Daýhan		1,248	Akdepe	Pagtaçylyk geňeşligi
Garrawy		1,397	Akdepe	Pagtaçylyk geňeşligi
Gazakly		684	Akdepe	Pagtaçylyk geňeşligi
Medet	G	1,064	Akdepe	Pagtaçylyk geňeşligi
Pagtaçylyk		1,511	Akdepe	Pagtaçylyk geňeşligi
Üçýap		1,309	Akdepe	Pagtaçylyk geňeşligi
Saýat	G	507	Akdepe	Sähra geňeşligi
Tokaýlyoba		335	Akdepe	Sähra geňeşligi
Üçagaç		1,612	Akdepe	Sähra geňeşligi
Ýeketut		1,495	Akdepe	Sähra geňeşligi
Bitaraplyk		433	Akdepe	Sazakly geňeşligi
Ketgenli	G	4,072	Akdepe	Sazakly geňeşligi
Pagtabaz		208	Akdepe	Sazakly geňeşligi
Sazaklyoý		1,401	Akdepe	Sazakly geňeşligi
Ýaldyrýap		1,342	Akdepe	Sazakly geňeşligi
Çatagaç		357	Akdepe	Täzeoba geňeşligi
Maşrykýap		1,665	Akdepe	Täzeoba geňeşligi
Türkmenistan	G	597	Akdepe	Täzeoba geňeşligi
Agzybirlik	G	996	Boldumsaz	10 ýyl abadanlyk geňeşligi
Täze zaman		765	Boldumsaz	10 ýyl abadanlyk geňeşligi
Ýagty ýol		1,618	Boldumsaz	10 ýyl abadanlyk geňeşligi
Ýaşlyk		1,166	Boldumsaz	10 ýyl abadanlyk geňeşligi
Watan		634	Boldumsaz	10 ýyl abadanlyk geňeşligi
Almalyk		1,815	Boldumsaz	Almalyk geňeşligi
Bereketli	G	1,258	Boldumsaz	Almalyk geňeşligi
Bitaraplyk		287	Boldumsaz	Almalyk geňeşligi
Çarwalar		590	Boldumsaz	Almalyk geňeşligi
Gülzar		423	Boldumsaz	Almalyk geňeşligi
Sähra		625	Boldumsaz	Almalyk geňeşligi
Söýegbagşy		1,014	Boldumsaz	Almalyk geňeşligi
Türkmenistan		1,162	Boldumsaz	Almalyk geňeşligi
Ýalkym		724	Boldumsaz	Almalyk geňeşligi
Bereket		446	Boldumsaz	Aşgabat geňeşligi
Çigoý	G	3,000	Boldumsaz	Aşgabat geňeşligi
Tahýadaş		1,157	Boldumsaz	Aşgabat geňeşligi
Täzegüýç		966	Boldumsaz	Aşgabat geňeşligi
Ýaldyroý		1,081	Boldumsaz	Aşgabat geňeşligi
Ýüpek ýoly		1,505	Boldumsaz	Aşgabat geňeşligi
Boldumsaz	C	39,532	Boldumsaz	Boldumsaz
Altyn sähra		1,310	Boldumsaz	Garaşsyzlyk geňeşligi
Asudalyk	G	1,002	Boldumsaz	Garaşsyzlyk geňeşligi
Diýar		1,343	Boldumsaz	Garaşsyzlyk geňeşligi
Meleje		1,538	Boldumsaz	Garaşsyzlyk geňeşligi
Otuzoba		353	Boldumsaz	Garaşsyzlyk geňeşligi
Ruhubelent		1,224	Boldumsaz	Garaşsyzlyk geňeşligi
Birleşik		2,693	Boldumsaz	Guwanç Atamedow adyndaky geňeşlik
Bozajy		732	Boldumsaz	Guwanç Atamedow adyndaky geňeşlik
Göbeklioý	G	4,663	Boldumsaz	Guwanç Atamedow adyndaky geňeşlik
Söhbet		2,849	Boldumsaz	Guwanç Atamedow adyndaky geňeşlik
Akmanýap	G	3,247	Boldumsaz	Guýanagyz geňeşligi
Guýanagyz		976	Boldumsaz	Guýanagyz geňeşligi
Altyn toprak	G	2,770	Boldumsaz	Medeniýet geňeşligi
Altyn zaman		1,605	Boldumsaz	Medeniýet geňeşligi
Bagçylar		667	Boldumsaz	Medeniýet geňeşligi
Kuwwat		1,157	Boldumsaz	Medeniýet geňeşligi
Medeniýet		549	Boldumsaz	Medeniýet geňeşligi
Bagtyýarlyk		1,165	Boldumsaz	Rowaçlyk geňeşligi
Galdaw	G	2,930	Boldumsaz	Rowaçlyk geňeşligi
Kölsaka		694	Boldumsaz	Rowaçlyk geňeşligi
Särarýap		1,544	Boldumsaz	Rowaçlyk geňeşligi
Altyn asyr	G	2,629	Boldumsaz	Zähmetkeş geňeşligi
Aýlakly		1,125	Boldumsaz	Zähmetkeş geňeşligi
Bozýer		1,048	Boldumsaz	Zähmetkeş geňeşligi
Garaýylgyn		1,808	Boldumsaz	Zähmetkeş geňeşligi
Daşoguz	C	201,142	Daşoguz	Daşoguz
Garaagaç		1,764	Garaşsyzlyk	Agzybirlik geňeşligi
Kürt		1,677	Garaşsyzlyk	Agzybirlik geňeşligi
Onbegi		2,813	Garaşsyzlyk	Agzybirlik geňeşligi
Rejepguly Ataýew	G	2,209	Garaşsyzlyk	Agzybirlik geňeşligi
Sabyrly		1,855	Garaşsyzlyk	Agzybirlik geňeşligi
Täte		3,425	Garaşsyzlyk	Agzybirlik geňeşligi
Agar		6,716	Garaşsyzlyk	Altyn toprak geňeşligi
Dörmen		3,596	Garaşsyzlyk	Altyn toprak geňeşligi
Garaşsyzlyk		3,591	Garaşsyzlyk	Altyn toprak geňeşligi
Göwender		4,412	Garaşsyzlyk	Altyn toprak geňeşligi
Keneges	G	4,805	Garaşsyzlyk	Altyn toprak geňeşligi
Ak altyn		2,441	Garaşsyzlyk	Ak altyn geňeşligi
Akja		4,311	Garaşsyzlyk	Ak altyn geňeşligi
Bagtyly		3,461	Garaşsyzlyk	Ak altyn geňeşligi
Gamyşlyk		4,578	Garaşsyzlyk	Ak altyn geňeşligi
Pekgeý		2,164	Garaşsyzlyk	Ak altyn geňeşligi
Täzeýol	G	4,581	Garaşsyzlyk	Ak altyn geňeşligi
Tekeli		1,048	Garaşsyzlyk	Ak altyn geňeşligi
Andalyp	C	36,594	Garaşsyzlyk	Andalyp
Basuwly	G	1,942	Garaşsyzlyk	Gyzyltakyr geňeşligi
Burunjyk		3,233	Garaşsyzlyk	Gyzyltakyr geňeşligi
Gyzyltakyr		1,434	Garaşsyzlyk	Gyzyltakyr geňeşligi
Andalyp	G	3,513	Garaşsyzlyk	Nurmuhammet Andalyp adyndaky geňeşlik
Düýeçi		2,578	Garaşsyzlyk	Nurmuhammet Andalyp adyndaky geňeşlik
Garamazy		8,578	Garaşsyzlyk	Nurmuhammet Andalyp adyndaky geňeşlik
Könegala		1,577	Garaşsyzlyk	Nurmuhammet Andalyp adyndaky geňeşlik
Torgaý		2,337	Garaşsyzlyk	Nurmuhammet Andalyp adyndaky geňeşlik
Bagty		1,980	Garaşsyzlyk	Rejepguly Ataýew
Bamyly		1,251	Garaşsyzlyk	Rejepguly Ataýew
Çildir		2,166	Garaşsyzlyk	Rejepguly Ataýew
Gyzyl		1,865	Garaşsyzlyk	Rejepguly Ataýew
Keşler		1,381	Garaşsyzlyk	Rejepguly Ataýew
Meňiş		3,594	Garaşsyzlyk	Rejepguly Ataýew
Omarly		1,874	Garaşsyzlyk	Rejepguly Ataýew
Orman		2,674	Garaşsyzlyk	Rejepguly Ataýew
Rejepguly Ataýew	T	2,760	Garaşsyzlyk	Rejepguly Ataýew
Çandyr		9,110	Garaşsyzlyk	Şabat geňeşligi
Derýalyk		4,598	Garaşsyzlyk	Şabat geňeşligi
Gülüstan		3,166	Garaşsyzlyk	Şabat geňeşligi
Magtym	G	3,506	Garaşsyzlyk	Şabat geňeşligi
Şarlawuk		2,538	Garaşsyzlyk	Şabat geňeşligi
Üçkepderi		326	Garaşsyzlyk	Şabat geňeşligi
Çarwalyk		2,265	Garaşsyzlyk	Sapyş Çerkezow adyndaky geňeşlik
Köpükli		3,236	Garaşsyzlyk	Sapyş Çerkezow adyndaky geňeşlik
Magaryf	G	4,698	Garaşsyzlyk	Sapyş Çerkezow adyndaky geňeşlik
Azatlyk		992	Garaşsyzlyk	Sazanda geňeşligi
Bagşyly		1,217	Garaşsyzlyk	Sazanda geňeşligi
Begleroba		492	Garaşsyzlyk	Sazanda geňeşligi
Sazanda	G	1,139	Garaşsyzlyk	Sazanda geňeşligi
Bagly	G	3,624	Garaşsyzlyk	Täzezaman geňeşligi
Dörtýap		2,489	Garaşsyzlyk	Täzezaman geňeşligi
Galkynyş		1,607	Garaşsyzlyk	Täzezaman geňeşligi
Heşdekler		1,579	Garaşsyzlyk	Täzezaman geňeşligi
Janam		3,719	Garaşsyzlyk	Täzezaman geňeşligi
Täzeçitir		3,163	Garaşsyzlyk	Täzezaman geňeşligi
Altyn asyr		308	Garaşsyzlyk	Üçkepderi geňeşligi
Dostluk	G	1,296	Garaşsyzlyk	Üçkepderi geňeşligi
Galalygyr		164	Garaşsyzlyk	Üçkepderi geňeşligi
Sözenli		137	Garaşsyzlyk	Üçkepderi geňeşligi
Akdüýeli		1,836	Görogly	Aksaraý geňeşligi
Akjeren		823	Görogly	Aksaraý geňeşligi
Aksaraý	G	2,770	Görogly	Aksaraý geňeşligi
Garamykly		358	Görogly	Aksaraý geňeşligi
Görelde		3,609	Görogly	Aksaraý geňeşligi
Ilaman		2,548	Görogly	Aksaraý geňeşligi
Tebele		1,779	Görogly	Aksaraý geňeşligi
Annagylyç Ataýew	G	4,006	Görogly	Annagylyç Ataýew adyndaky geňeşlik
Bäşatly		1,620	Görogly	Annagylyç Ataýew adyndaky geňeşlik
Gölli		2,510	Görogly	Annagylyç Ataýew adyndaky geňeşlik
Hangala		653	Görogly	Annagylyç Ataýew adyndaky geňeşlik
Şorýap		1,164	Görogly	Annagylyç Ataýew adyndaky geňeşlik
Çoşşy Arazgylyjow	G	4,505	Görogly	Balyş Öwezow adyndaky geňeşlik
Döwletli		1,864	Görogly	Balyş Öwezow adyndaky geňeşlik
Galaly		488	Görogly	Balyş Öwezow adyndaky geňeşlik
Täze		1,236	Görogly	Balyş Öwezow adyndaky geňeşlik
Wekilgala		1,791	Görogly	Balyş Öwezow adyndaky geňeşlik
Edermen		2,814	Görogly	Bedirkent geňeşligi
Kyrkgyz		1,885	Görogly	Bedirkent geňeşligi
Ýaňyýap	G	6,639	Görogly	Bedirkent geňeşligi
Çarbagly		3,633	Görogly	Bereket geňeşligi
Derekliýap		620	Görogly	Bereket geňeşligi
Goýunly		2,570	Görogly	Bereket geňeşligi
Şordepe		565	Görogly	Bereket geňeşligi
Uzynguýy		2,948	Görogly	Bereket geňeşligi
Ýagtylyk	G	2,239	Görogly	Bereket geňeşligi
Ýylgynly		2,953	Görogly	Bereket geňeşligi
Bäşjykyr		1,161	Görogly	Durdy Gylyç adyndaky geňeşlik
Birinji Diregli		1,435	Görogly	Durdy Gylyç adyndaky geňeşlik
Düýeboýun		159	Görogly	Durdy Gylyç adyndaky geňeşlik
Garagulak		1,296	Görogly	Durdy Gylyç adyndaky geňeşlik
Ikinji Diregli	G	1,636	Görogly	Durdy Gylyç adyndaky geňeşlik
Damla		576	Görogly	Garagum geňeşligi
Garaýanyk	G	219	Görogly	Garagum geňeşligi
Kyrkguýy		67	Görogly	Garagum geňeşligi
Görogly	C	26,770	Görogly	Görogly
Altyngöl		4,442	Görogly	Hüdük Myradow adyndaky geňeşlik
Aýlakýap		5,169	Görogly	Hüdük Myradow adyndaky geňeşlik
Bedirkent	G	1,704	Görogly	Hüdük Myradow adyndaky geňeşlik
Buzgömen		2,706	Görogly	Hüdük Myradow adyndaky geňeşlik
Tamdyrly		219	Görogly	Hüdük Myradow adyndaky geňeşlik
Ýediýap		484	Görogly	Hüdük Myradow adyndaky geňeşlik
Agöý	G	3,019	Görogly	Magtymguly adyndaky geňeşlik
Akgöl		3,019	Görogly	Magtymguly adyndaky geňeşlik
Daşly		1,100	Görogly	Magtymguly adyndaky geňeşlik
Döwdan		1,197	Görogly	Magtymguly adyndaky geňeşlik
Hatartam		3,070	Görogly	Magtymguly adyndaky geňeşlik
Nazarguly		2,262	Görogly	Magtymguly adyndaky geňeşlik
Temeç		2,999	Görogly	Magtymguly adyndaky geňeşlik
Ýalkym		1,882	Görogly	Magtymguly adyndaky geňeşlik
Ýaşlyk		1,624	Görogly	Magtymguly adyndaky geňeşlik
Almaatyşan		1,932	Görogly	Türkmenistan geňeşligi
Daýhanýap		1,480	Görogly	Türkmenistan geňeşligi
Kerpiçli	G	4,041	Görogly	Türkmenistan geňeşligi
Çaňlyýap		2,154	Görogly	Türkmenýoly geňeşligi
Garaýyk	G	1,318	Görogly	Türkmenýoly geňeşligi
Gökje		1,821	Görogly	Türkmenýoly geňeşligi
Keseýap		1,516	Görogly	Türkmenýoly geňeşligi
Akguýy		1,171	Görogly	Ýagtylyk geňeşligi
Atalyk		2,274	Görogly	Ýagtylyk geňeşligi
Boýunbaş	G	3,346	Görogly	Ýagtylyk geňeşligi
Garakly		536	Görogly	Ýagtylyk geňeşligi
Gumlydepe		3,100	Görogly	Ýagtylyk geňeşligi
Yzmykşir		1,291	Görogly	Ýagtylyk geňeşligi
Galkynyş		192	Görogly	Yzmykşir geňeşligi
Gulamgala		394	Görogly	Yzmykşir geňeşligi
Hojaýap		335	Görogly	Yzmykşir geňeşligi
Maýabatan		462	Görogly	Yzmykşir geňeşligi
Täzeöýli		535	Görogly	Yzmykşir geňeşligi
Ýenbekçi	G	416	Görogly	Yzmykşir geňeşligi
Akdepe	G	2,323	Görogly	Zaman geňeşligi
Bagtyýarlyk		1,600	Görogly	Zaman geňeşligi
Öwlüýäboýy		4,620	Görogly	Zaman geňeşligi
Täzeýol		2,051	Görogly	Zaman geňeşligi
Abadanlyk	G	4,696	Gubadag	Abadanlyk geňeşligi
Agzybirlik		2,008	Gubadag	Abadanlyk geňeşligi
Bagalar		1,922	Gubadag	Abadanlyk geňeşligi
Bäsdeş		1,846	Gubadag	Abadanlyk geňeşligi
Gumly		4,496	Gubadag	Abadanlyk geňeşligi
Döwletli		1,965	Gubadag	Akýaýla geňeşligi
Görelde		556	Gubadag	Akýaýla geňeşligi
Ýelharaz	G	4,688	Gubadag	Akýaýla geňeşligi
Aýlak		1,519	Gubadag	Amyderýa geňeşligi
Burkutýap		249	Gubadag	Amyderýa geňeşligi
Çägeli		2,852	Gubadag	Amyderýa geňeşligi
Mäter		1,483	Gubadag	Amyderýa geňeşligi
Öküzýap	G	4,657	Gubadag	Amyderýa geňeşligi
Rowaçlyk		1,483	Gubadag	Amyderýa geňeşligi
Tutlyýap		2,737	Gubadag	Amyderýa geňeşligi
Ýylangyr		1,632	Gubadag	Amyderýa geňeşligi
Babadaýhan		417	Gubadag	Babadaýhan geňeşligi
Daýhanazat		1,675	Gubadag	Babadaýhan geňeşligi
Wahym	G	2,230	Gubadag	Babadaýhan geňeşligi
Badaýap		1,696	Gubadag	Baýdak geňeşligi
Çüýrükgala	G	1,888	Gubadag	Baýdak geňeşligi
Garadepe		3,849	Gubadag	Baýdak geňeşligi
Mergenoba		2,749	Gubadag	Baýdak geňeşligi
Üçköl		1,813	Gubadag	Baýdak geňeşligi
Badalar		2,745	Gubadag	Bereketli geňeşligi
Bozýap		1,229	Gubadag	Bereketli geňeşligi
Gumlyoba		3,505	Gubadag	Bereketli geňeşligi
Jemşidigala		2,990	Gubadag	Bereketli geňeşligi
Täzegala	G	3,647	Gubadag	Bereketli geňeşligi
Uşak		3,851	Gubadag	Bereketli geňeşligi
Derýalyk		1,139	Gubadag	Bitarap Türkmenistan geňeşligi
Garaköl		3,651	Gubadag	Bitarap Türkmenistan geňeşligi
Garaýap		858	Gubadag	Bitarap Türkmenistan geňeşligi
Gökýap		966	Gubadag	Bitarap Türkmenistan geňeşligi
Igdirli	G	2,376	Gubadag	Bitarap Türkmenistan geňeşligi
Kyrkgara		1,576	Gubadag	Bitarap Türkmenistan geňeşligi
Boldumsaz		1,206	Gubadag	Çowdur geňeşligi
Malaýýap		2,867	Gubadag	Çowdur geňeşligi
Tommakýap	G	2,454	Gubadag	Çowdur geňeşligi
Duzlyköl		1,577	Gubadag	Gökçäge
Gökçäge	T	7,569	Gubadag	Gökçäge
Maňňyt		4,170	Gubadag	Gökçäge
Ak altyn	G	3,672	Gubadag	Gökýaýla geňeşligi
Dostluk		1,112	Gubadag	Gökýaýla geňeşligi
Ýekederek		1,413	Gubadag	Gökýaýla geňeşligi
Beglerýap	G	1,363	Gubadag	Gubadag geňeşligi
Galajyk		2,352	Gubadag	Gubadag geňeşligi
Gökgala		1,321	Gubadag	Gubadag geňeşligi
Mollanepes		1,171	Gubadag	Gubadag geňeşligi
Weliýap		2,536	Gubadag	Gubadag geňeşligi
Gubadag	C	18,950	Gubadag	Gubadag
Gatyoý		3,734	Gubadag	Jeýhun geňeşligi
Gumýatak		362	Gubadag	Jeýhun geňeşligi
Gyrlyoba		1,242	Gubadag	Jeýhun geňeşligi
Jumabaýsaka			Gubadag	Jeýhun geňeşligi
Pagtaçy	G	2,024	Gubadag	Jeýhun geňeşligi
Amyderýa		1,951	Gubadag	Ýaşlyk geňeşligi
Berkararlyk		2,305	Gubadag	Ýaşlyk geňeşligi
Gulabiýa	G	2,649	Gubadag	Ýaşlyk geňeşligi
Lawakly		1,891	Gubadag	Ýaşlyk geňeşligi
Akderýa	G	1,964	Köneürgenç	Akderýa geňeşligi
Bakyýap		840	Köneürgenç	Akderýa geňeşligi
Emingala		884	Köneürgenç	Akderýa geňeşligi
Halykberdi		711	Köneürgenç	Akderýa geňeşligi
Tamdyrlyboz		1,105	Köneürgenç	Akderýa geňeşligi
Täzebirleşik		3,008	Köneürgenç	Akderýa geňeşligi
Akgala	G	5,574	Köneürgenç	Akgala geňeşligi
Gumly		523	Köneürgenç	Akgala geňeşligi
Gyzylýer		5,774	Köneürgenç	Akgala geňeşligi
Horezm		2,395	Köneürgenç	Akgala geňeşligi
Hywaçyoý		1,692	Köneürgenç	Akgala geňeşligi
Jelaleddin		2,399	Köneürgenç	Akgala geňeşligi
Köçerýap		1,426	Köneürgenç	Akgala geňeşligi
Uýgurýer		2,433	Köneürgenç	Akgala geňeşligi
Eýmiroba		582	Köneürgenç	Akýol geňeşligi
Lebiýap		959	Köneürgenç	Akýol geňeşligi
Paltagaçan		662	Köneürgenç	Akýol geňeşligi
Täze		1,236	Köneürgenç	Akýol geňeşligi
Zaman	G	1,236	Köneürgenç	Akýol geňeşligi
Baýnuroý		1,510	Köneürgenç	Bereket
Bereket	T	13,549	Köneürgenç	Bereket
Dostluk		1,832	Köneürgenç	Bereket
Ýedigara		7,844	Köneürgenç	Bereket
Bitaraplyk	T		Köneürgenç	Bitaraplyk
Çilter		1,625	Köneürgenç	Bitaraplyk
Gamyşlyoý		481	Köneürgenç	Bitaraplyk
Garaşsyzlyk		1,518	Köneürgenç	Bitaraplyk
Gazakýer		480	Köneürgenç	Bitaraplyk
Täzeýol		1,996	Köneürgenç	Bitaraplyk
Aktam		1,116	Köneürgenç	Derýalyk geňeşligi
Annagara		2,663	Köneürgenç	Derýalyk geňeşligi
Birinji Was		585	Köneürgenç	Derýalyk geňeşligi
Derýalyk	G	4,212	Köneürgenç	Derýalyk geňeşligi
Kyrkgyzoý		2,439	Köneürgenç	Derýalyk geňeşligi
Ezberköl	G	3,320	Köneürgenç	Ezberköl geňeşligi
Körgala		441	Köneürgenç	Ezberköl geňeşligi
Galkynyş	G	2,062	Köneürgenç	Galkynyş geňeşligi
Goçgarköpri		2,361	Köneürgenç	Galkynyş geňeşligi
Guýanagyz		255	Köneürgenç	Galkynyş geňeşligi
Jigirdekli		2,205	Köneürgenç	Galkynyş geňeşligi
Hakykat	G	2,090	Köneürgenç	Hakykat geňeşligi
Hojaoý		1,648	Köneürgenç	Hakykat geňeşligi
Toklyoý		785	Köneürgenç	Hakykat geňeşligi
Türkmenistan		546	Köneürgenç	Hakykat geňeşligi
Köneürgenç	C	37,176	Köneürgenç	Köneürgenç
Galpakýaran		817	Köneürgenç	Kyrkgyz geňeşligi
Garaoý		692	Köneürgenç	Kyrkgyz geňeşligi
Gulaçýap		1,427	Köneürgenç	Kyrkgyz geňeşligi
Kyrkgyz	G	2,779	Köneürgenç	Kyrkgyz geňeşligi
Buýanly		1,308	Köneürgenç	Maslahat geňeşligi
Daýhanbirleşik		2,846	Köneürgenç	Maslahat geňeşligi
Maslahat	G	5,815	Köneürgenç	Maslahat geňeşligi
Maslahatdepe		2,237	Köneürgenç	Maslahat geňeşligi
Saraýgöl		435	Köneürgenç	Maslahat geňeşligi
Bagtyýarlyk		1,211	Köneürgenç	Pagtaçy geňeşligi
Birleşik		67	Köneürgenç	Pagtaçy geňeşligi
Garatereň		790	Köneürgenç	Pagtaçy geňeşligi
Gatyakar		952	Köneürgenç	Pagtaçy geňeşligi
Künjilioý		1,257	Köneürgenç	Pagtaçy geňeşligi
Pagtaçy	G	3,029	Köneürgenç	Pagtaçy geňeşligi
Akgum		477	Köneürgenç	Täzegüýç geňeşligi
Boýraçy		817	Köneürgenç	Täzegüýç geňeşligi
Garabelemýap		1,387	Köneürgenç	Täzegüýç geňeşligi
Gumlygala		1,464	Köneürgenç	Täzegüýç geňeşligi
Täzegüýç	G	3,875	Köneürgenç	Täzegüýç geňeşligi
Wekiloý		999	Köneürgenç	Täzegüýç geňeşligi
Akbaşly		1,811	Köneürgenç	Täzeýap geňeşligi
Täzeýap	G	1,577	Köneürgenç	Täzeýap geňeşligi
Uşakýap		3,169	Köneürgenç	Täzeýap geňeşligi
Aktakyr		1,327	Köneürgenç	Watan geňeşligi
Çetilioý		471	Köneürgenç	Watan geňeşligi
Döwletli		1,439	Köneürgenç	Watan geňeşligi
Ikinji Was		85	Köneürgenç	Watan geňeşligi
Teňňelioý		451	Köneürgenç	Watan geňeşligi
Watan	G	1,546	Köneürgenç	Watan geňeşligi
Akarýap		373	Ruhubelent	Aşyk Aýdyň geňeşligi
Aşyk Aýdyň	G	393	Ruhubelent	Aşyk Aýdyň geňeşligi
Bagşyly			Ruhubelent	Aşyk Aýdyň geňeşligi
Kuwwat		389	Ruhubelent	Aşyk Aýdyň geňeşligi
Oguzboýy		651	Ruhubelent	Aşyk Aýdyň geňeşligi
Uzboý		253	Ruhubelent	Aşyk Aýdyň geňeşligi
Wasabat		876	Ruhubelent	Aşyk Aýdyň geňeşligi
Diýarbekir	G	466	Ruhubelent	Diýarbekir geňeşligi
Şähribossan		557	Ruhubelent	Diýarbekir geňeşligi
Agzybirlik		665	Ruhubelent	Geňeş geňeşligi
Çardepe		546	Ruhubelent	Geňeş geňeşligi
Geňeş	G	907	Ruhubelent	Geňeş geňeşligi
Oglanly		519	Ruhubelent	Geňeş geňeşligi
Parahat		297	Ruhubelent	Geňeş geňeşligi
Şagadam		297	Ruhubelent	Geňeş geňeşligi
Oguzhan		868	Ruhubelent	Ruhnama geňeşligi
Ruhnama	G	503	Ruhubelent	Ruhnama geňeşligi
Ruhubelent	T	1,653	Ruhubelent	Ruhubelent
Çalymergen		658	Ruhubelent	Şabende adyndaky geňeşlik
Magrupy		394	Ruhubelent	Şabende adyndaky geňeşlik
Maňgyr		282	Ruhubelent	Şabende adyndaky geňeşlik
Maňgyrabat		425	Ruhubelent	Şabende adyndaky geňeşlik
Şabende	G	1,248	Ruhubelent	Şabende adyndaky geňeşlik
Täzeýer		267	Ruhubelent	Şabende adyndaky geňeşlik
Altyn sähra		377	Ruhubelent	Şagadam geňeşligi
Bereketli		507	Ruhubelent	Şagadam geňeşligi
Çaýyrly		566	Ruhubelent	Şagadam geňeşligi
Duzgyr		370	Ruhubelent	Şagadam geňeşligi
Gyzyljaburun		758	Ruhubelent	Şagadam geňeşligi
Täzeoba		35	Ruhubelent	Şagadam geňeşligi
Türkmenistan	G	573	Ruhubelent	Şagadam geňeşligi
Yslam		744	Ruhubelent	Şagadam geňeşligi
Altyn zaman		580	Ruhubelent	Tünüderýa geňeşligi
Galkynyş		608	Ruhubelent	Tünüderýa geňeşligi
Garagum		77	Ruhubelent	Tünüderýa geňeşligi
Gäwersgyr		60	Ruhubelent	Tünüderýa geňeşligi
Şasenem		188	Ruhubelent	Tünüderýa geňeşligi
Tünüderýa	G	1,202	Ruhubelent	Tünüderýa geňeşligi
Egriguýy	G	1,307	Ruhubelent	Ýomut Durdyýew adyndaky geňeşlik
Çardere		1,221	Ruhubelent	Zähmet geňeşligi
Toprakgala	G	1,785	Ruhubelent	Zähmet geňeşligi
Was		3,456	Ruhubelent	Zähmet geňeşligi
Wasgala		312	Ruhubelent	Zähmet geňeşligi
Garaporsaň	G	3,284	Şabat	Adalat geňeşligi
Garawuldepe		2,811	Şabat	Adalat geňeşligi
Garaýabyly		1,489	Şabat	Adalat geňeşligi
Agzybirlik		2,012	Şabat	Altynýol geňeşligi
Dilewar	G	2,820	Şabat	Altynýol geňeşligi
Şorýer		1,224	Şabat	Altynýol geňeşligi
Birinji Gulan		788	Şabat	Alyşir Nowaýy adyndaky geňeşlik
Daýhanazat		2,894	Şabat	Alyşir Nowaýy adyndaky geňeşlik
Gamyşkak		2,984	Şabat	Alyşir Nowaýy adyndaky geňeşlik
Gumgala		1,171	Şabat	Alyşir Nowaýy adyndaky geňeşlik
Hemzeşyh	G	4,497	Şabat	Alyşir Nowaýy adyndaky geňeşlik
Ikinji Gulan		1,635	Şabat	Alyşir Nowaýy adyndaky geňeşlik
Bozgala		3,458	Şabat	Asudalyk geňeşligi
Maýlyjeňňel	G	4,585	Şabat	Asudalyk geňeşligi
Täzeusul		1,909	Şabat	Asudalyk geňeşligi
Guljangala	G	1,841	Şabat	Berkarar geňeşligi
Bagban		1,298	Şabat	Biruni adyndaky geňeşlik
Mehinli	G	3,563	Şabat	Biruni adyndaky geňeşlik
Alyşir Nowaýy		2,869	Şabat	Bossan geňeşligi
Helleň	G	3,844	Şabat	Bossan geňeşligi
Mädorazbatyr		2,728	Şabat	Bossan geňeşligi
Şabat		714	Şabat	Bossan geňeşligi
Sekizöýli		2,501	Şabat	Bossan geňeşligi
Abdalýap	G	4,649	Şabat	Diýar geňeşligi
Aýakketli		5,715	Şabat	Diýar geňeşligi
Galkynyş		5,060	Şabat	Diýar geňeşligi
Ogşuk		3,473	Şabat	Diýar geňeşligi
Jemşit		2,816	Şabat	Gaýrat geňeşligi
Täzedurmuş		1,767	Şabat	Gaýrat geňeşligi
Ulugek		1,968	Şabat	Gaýrat geňeşligi
Ýaňyýol	G	2,913	Şabat	Gaýrat geňeşligi
Öwezaly		3,731	Şabat	Gülüstan geňeşligi
Parahat	G	9,850	Şabat	Gülüstan geňeşligi
Şark		4,238	Şabat	Gülüstan geňeşligi
Ýoldaş Ahmedow		2,522	Şabat	Gülüstan geňeşligi
Altmyş		3,312	Şabat	Hasylçy geňeşligi
Boz		132	Şabat	Hasylçy geňeşligi
Diwanbegi		1,042	Şabat	Hasylçy geňeşligi
Gargaly		3,071	Şabat	Hasylçy geňeşligi
Hasylçy	G	3,762	Şabat	Hasylçy geňeşligi
Serhetabat		403	Şabat	Hasylçy geňeşligi
Ynkylap		2,135	Şabat	Hasylçy geňeşligi
Bäşmergen		1,803	Şabat	Nowbahar geňeşligi
Garamanly		3,881	Şabat	Nowbahar geňeşligi
Gülzar		2,837	Şabat	Nowbahar geňeşligi
Rozumboý	G	7,410	Şabat	Nowbahar geňeşligi
Şyhgala		6,025	Şabat	Nowbahar geňeşligi
Täze ýol		6,249	Şabat	Nowbahar geňeşligi
Şabat	C	19,392	Şabat	Şabat
Ak altyn		344	Şabat	Sadylla Rozmetow
Altynköl		1,085	Şabat	Sadylla Rozmetow
Bereket		319	Şabat	Sadylla Rozmetow
Bossan		324	Şabat	Sadylla Rozmetow
Çarbag		1,680	Şabat	Sadylla Rozmetow
Derýalyk		94	Şabat	Sadylla Rozmetow
Döwletli		955	Şabat	Sadylla Rozmetow
Gaýrat		1,684	Şabat	Sadylla Rozmetow
Isgender Hojaýew		2,288	Şabat	Sadylla Rozmetow
Kyýat		1,045	Şabat	Sadylla Rozmetow
Nowbahar		524	Şabat	Sadylla Rozmetow
Nowruz		2,345	Şabat	Sadylla Rozmetow
Oýrat		2,030	Şabat	Sadylla Rozmetow
Pagtaçy		1,546	Şabat	Sadylla Rozmetow
Sadylla Rozmetow	T	2,316	Şabat	Sadylla Rozmetow
Watan		847	Şabat	Sadylla Rozmetow
Ýaňyýer		1,115	Şabat	Sadylla Rozmetow
Ýarmyş		2,356	Şabat	Sadylla Rozmetow
Ýaşlyk		309	Şabat	Sadylla Rozmetow
Ýyldyz		1,757	Şabat	Sadylla Rozmetow
Zawod		198	Şabat	Sadylla Rozmetow
Çagataý		1,168	Şabat	Şatlyk geňeşligi
Eýwança		3,418	Şabat	Şatlyk geňeşligi
Şabatly		4,789	Şabat	Şatlyk geňeşligi
Şöhrat		4,654	Şabat	Şatlyk geňeşligi
Täzebazar	G	3,091	Şabat	Şatlyk geňeşligi
Uzynköl		751	Şabat	Şatlyk geňeşligi
Bagtyýarlyk		1,451	Şabat	Şöhrat geňeşligi
Buýanly		4,450	Şabat	Şöhrat geňeşligi
Medeniýet		2,067	Şabat	Şöhrat geňeşligi
Aşyr Kakabaýew	T	9,603	Saparmyrat Türkmenbaşy	Aşyr Kakabaýew
Garaoý		2,832	Saparmyrat Türkmenbaşy	Aşyr Kakabaýew
Garawulgala		1,879	Saparmyrat Türkmenbaşy	Aşyr Kakabaýew
Gojukgala		3,413	Saparmyrat Türkmenbaşy	Aşyr Kakabaýew
Harmanjyk		1,442	Saparmyrat Türkmenbaşy	Aşyr Kakabaýew
Şarawýap		479	Saparmyrat Türkmenbaşy	Aşyr Kakabaýew
Şirwan		322	Saparmyrat Türkmenbaşy	Aşyr Kakabaýew
Aýböwür	G	1,176	Saparmyrat Türkmenbaşy	Aýböwür geňeşligi
Diňliburun		158	Saparmyrat Türkmenbaşy	Aýböwür geňeşligi
Kesekli		224	Saparmyrat Türkmenbaşy	Aýböwür geňeşligi
Merjen		138	Saparmyrat Türkmenbaşy	Aýböwür geňeşligi
Sarygaldaw		959	Saparmyrat Türkmenbaşy	Aýböwür geňeşligi
Aktam		776	Saparmyrat Türkmenbaşy	Azatlyk geňeşligi
Alýan	G	2,299	Saparmyrat Türkmenbaşy	Azatlyk geňeşligi
Bäşýap		361	Saparmyrat Türkmenbaşy	Azatlyk geňeşligi
Giňýandak		1,021	Saparmyrat Türkmenbaşy	Azatlyk geňeşligi
Gyzylkümmet		847	Saparmyrat Türkmenbaşy	Azatlyk geňeşligi
Işanköl		561	Saparmyrat Türkmenbaşy	Azatlyk geňeşligi
Medeniýet		469	Saparmyrat Türkmenbaşy	Baýram Taganow adyndaky geňeşlik
Toklulyoý	G	1,178	Saparmyrat Türkmenbaşy	Baýram Taganow adyndaky geňeşlik
Birleşik		414	Saparmyrat Türkmenbaşy	Bitaraplyk geňeşligi
Bitaraplyk	G	481	Saparmyrat Türkmenbaşy	Bitaraplyk geňeşligi
Monjukly		114	Saparmyrat Türkmenbaşy	Bitaraplyk geňeşligi
Nowruz		608	Saparmyrat Türkmenbaşy	Bitaraplyk geňeşligi
Täzezaman		340	Saparmyrat Türkmenbaşy	Bitaraplyk geňeşligi
Zähmetkeş		657	Saparmyrat Türkmenbaşy	Bitaraplyk geňeşligi
Bereketli		2,404	Saparmyrat Türkmenbaşy	Bugdaýly geňeşligi
Narböwet		383	Saparmyrat Türkmenbaşy	Bugdaýly geňeşligi
Täzeýer	G	1,264	Saparmyrat Türkmenbaşy	Bugdaýly geňeşligi
Berdinyýazhowly		486	Saparmyrat Türkmenbaşy	Dostluk geňeşligi
Gylyçbaýhowly		1,517	Saparmyrat Türkmenbaşy	Dostluk geňeşligi
Jembap		2,068	Saparmyrat Türkmenbaşy	Dostluk geňeşligi
Kemine		684	Saparmyrat Türkmenbaşy	Dostluk geňeşligi
Nazarbaýdegiş	G	2,563	Saparmyrat Türkmenbaşy	Dostluk geňeşligi
Akböwet		115	Saparmyrat Türkmenbaşy	Döwkesen geňeşligi
Ak öý		145	Saparmyrat Türkmenbaşy	Döwkesen geňeşligi
Baleýşem		542	Saparmyrat Türkmenbaşy	Döwkesen geňeşligi
Bötendag		697	Saparmyrat Türkmenbaşy	Döwkesen geňeşligi
Döwkesen	G	503	Saparmyrat Türkmenbaşy	Döwkesen geňeşligi
Bozýap		529	Saparmyrat Türkmenbaşy	Döwletli geňeşligi
Döwletli	G	2,095	Saparmyrat Türkmenbaşy	Döwletli geňeşligi
Düýetam		1,339	Saparmyrat Türkmenbaşy	Döwletli geňeşligi
Gallaçy	G	3,112	Saparmyrat Türkmenbaşy	Gallaçy geňeşligi
Ruhubelent		286	Saparmyrat Türkmenbaşy	Gallaçy geňeşligi
Bakyýap		1,687	Saparmyrat Türkmenbaşy	Görelde geňeşligi
Gumgaçy		1,136	Saparmyrat Türkmenbaşy	Görelde geňeşligi
Sowranly	G	1,878	Saparmyrat Türkmenbaşy	Görelde geňeşligi
Agzybirlik		1,540	Saparmyrat Türkmenbaşy	Goşahowly geňeşligi
Arzuw	G	3,065	Saparmyrat Türkmenbaşy	Goşahowly geňeşligi
Babadaýhan		312	Saparmyrat Türkmenbaşy	Goşahowly geňeşligi
Bäştam		699	Saparmyrat Türkmenbaşy	Goşahowly geňeşligi
Bereket		307	Saparmyrat Türkmenbaşy	Goşahowly geňeşligi
Galkynyş		393	Saparmyrat Türkmenbaşy	Goşahowly geňeşligi
Goşahowly		690	Saparmyrat Türkmenbaşy	Goşahowly geňeşligi
Kemerýylgyn		725	Saparmyrat Türkmenbaşy	Goşahowly geňeşligi
Kyrkguýy		1,006	Saparmyrat Türkmenbaşy	Goşahowly geňeşligi
Peşanalydepe		2,574	Saparmyrat Türkmenbaşy	Goşahowly geňeşligi
Gazakdegiş	G	4,035	Saparmyrat Türkmenbaşy	Güneşli Türkmenistan geňeşligi
Gazly		1,273	Saparmyrat Türkmenbaşy	Güneşli Türkmenistan geňeşligi
Gumýol		256	Saparmyrat Türkmenbaşy	Güneşli Türkmenistan geňeşligi
Şäherlik		886	Saparmyrat Türkmenbaşy	Güneşli Türkmenistan geňeşligi
Üstýurt		263	Saparmyrat Türkmenbaşy	Güneşli Türkmenistan geňeşligi
Eminhowly		1,033	Saparmyrat Türkmenbaşy	Gyzyljagala geňeşligi
Garadepe		1,733	Saparmyrat Türkmenbaşy	Gyzyljagala geňeşligi
Garasaç		807	Saparmyrat Türkmenbaşy	Gyzyljagala geňeşligi
Gyzyljagala		1,308	Saparmyrat Türkmenbaşy	Gyzyljagala geňeşligi
Hojaly		1,162	Saparmyrat Türkmenbaşy	Gyzyljagala geňeşligi
Kirşenoý	G	2,737	Saparmyrat Türkmenbaşy	Gyzyljagala geňeşligi
Sazakýap		939	Saparmyrat Türkmenbaşy	Gyzyljagala geňeşligi
Kernaýoba		1,120	Saparmyrat Türkmenbaşy	Kemine geňeşligi
Seýitýaýla	G	2,129	Saparmyrat Türkmenbaşy	Kemine geňeşligi
Ýylgynly		576	Saparmyrat Türkmenbaşy	Kemine geňeşligi
Garryýasga		1,422	Saparmyrat Türkmenbaşy	Mollaoraz Hojamämmedow adyndaky geňeşlik
Gatylyk		670	Saparmyrat Türkmenbaşy	Mollaoraz Hojamämmedow adyndaky geňeşlik
Guýulyk	G	2,039	Saparmyrat Türkmenbaşy	Mollaoraz Hojamämmedow adyndaky geňeşlik
Çynakar		539	Saparmyrat Türkmenbaşy	Nazly Gylyjow adyndaky geňeşlik
Gölýap		970	Saparmyrat Türkmenbaşy	Nazly Gylyjow adyndaky geňeşlik
Gyzylçaryk	G	4,501	Saparmyrat Türkmenbaşy	Nazly Gylyjow adyndaky geňeşlik
Togalakdepe		919	Saparmyrat Türkmenbaşy	Nazly Gylyjow adyndaky geňeşlik
Ýekeagaçly		441	Saparmyrat Türkmenbaşy	Nazly Gylyjow adyndaky geňeşlik
Dawalyköl		840	Saparmyrat Türkmenbaşy	Parahat geňeşligi
Gölýer	G	3,344	Saparmyrat Türkmenbaşy	Parahat geňeşligi
Seňňer		1,034	Saparmyrat Türkmenbaşy	Parahat geňeşligi
Akdegiş		753	Saparmyrat Türkmenbaşy	Ruhabat geňeşligi
Bozoba	G	854	Saparmyrat Türkmenbaşy	Ruhabat geňeşligi
Ruhabat		753	Saparmyrat Türkmenbaşy	Ruhabat geňeşligi
Çopandepe		334	Saparmyrat Türkmenbaşy	Şamahy geňeşligi
Gyradegen		846	Saparmyrat Türkmenbaşy	Şamahy geňeşligi
Sabynýol		412	Saparmyrat Türkmenbaşy	Şamahy geňeşligi
Şamahy	G	2,815	Saparmyrat Türkmenbaşy	Şamahy geňeşligi
Syzalyoý		988	Saparmyrat Türkmenbaşy	Şamahy geňeşligi
Kiçigum		1,005	Saparmyrat Türkmenbaşy	Saparmät Hojaýew adyndaky geňeşlik
Ýartygala	G	89	Saparmyrat Türkmenbaşy	Saparmät Hojaýew adyndaky geňeşlik
Saparmyrat Türkmenbaşy	C	20,720	Saparmyrat Türkmenbaşy	Saparmyrat Türkmenbaşy
Atgyrlan		597	Saparmyrat Türkmenbaşy	Sarygamyş geňeşligi
Gyzyltam		1,738	Saparmyrat Türkmenbaşy	Sarygamyş geňeşligi
Sarygamyş	G	4,682	Saparmyrat Türkmenbaşy	Sarygamyş geňeşligi
Selmeliköl		1,178	Saparmyrat Türkmenbaşy	Sarygamyş geňeşligi
Aýryçagyl		668	Saparmyrat Türkmenbaşy	Serdar geňeşligi
Kaşgaýol		995	Saparmyrat Türkmenbaşy	Serdar geňeşligi
Serdar	G	1,662	Saparmyrat Türkmenbaşy	Serdar geňeşligi
Daşsaka		639	Saparmyrat Türkmenbaşy	Täzedurmuş geňeşligi
Üçtam	G	3,051	Saparmyrat Türkmenbaşy	Täzedurmuş geňeşligi
Akýap		1,045	Saparmyrat Türkmenbaşy	Ýalkym geňeşligi
Annaoý		1,684	Saparmyrat Türkmenbaşy	Ýalkym geňeşligi
Badasuw		524	Saparmyrat Türkmenbaşy	Ýalkym geňeşligi
Gözelçäge		465	Saparmyrat Türkmenbaşy	Ýalkym geňeşligi
Guşbegi		908	Saparmyrat Türkmenbaşy	Ýalkym geňeşligi
Toraňňyly	G	2,109	Saparmyrat Türkmenbaşy	Ýalkym geňeşligi
Uzynsuw		1,274	Saparmyrat Türkmenbaşy	Ýalkym geňeşligi
Gyjakly		1,179	Saparmyrat Türkmenbaşy	Ýeňiş geňeşligi
Nefereoý	G	1,104	Saparmyrat Türkmenbaşy	Ýeňiş geňeşligi
Ýeňiş		1,359	Saparmyrat Türkmenbaşy	Ýeňiş geňeşligi
Gumly		1,759	Çärjew District	Amyderýa geňeşligi
Guýymugal		1,401	Çärjew District	Amyderýa geňeşligi
Hydyrili		1,164	Çärjew District	Amyderýa geňeşligi
Täzeoba		1,448	Çärjew District	Amyderýa geňeşligi
Ýokarymugal		1,004	Çärjew District	Amyderýa geňeşligi
Zähmetkeş	G	2,570	Çärjew District	Amyderýa geňeşligi
Zarpçy		1,200	Çärjew District	Amyderýa geňeşligi
Açyl Mürzäýew	G	3,714	Çärjew District	Balta Myradow adyndaky geňeşlik
Balta Myradow		1,655	Çärjew District	Balta Myradow adyndaky geňeşlik
Baýatlar		1,605	Çärjew District	Balta Myradow adyndaky geňeşlik
Bereketli		2,566	Çärjew District	Balta Myradow adyndaky geňeşlik
Birleşik		1,156	Çärjew District	Balta Myradow adyndaky geňeşlik
Hojamekan		811	Çärjew District	Balta Myradow adyndaky geňeşlik
Ulyçarlak		2,364	Çärjew District	Balta Myradow adyndaky geňeşlik
Egrigüzer		1,472	Çärjew District	Bereket geňeşligi
Gazagoba		195	Çärjew District	Bereket geňeşligi
Gaýybaýat		2,139	Çärjew District	Bereket geňeşligi
Gökler		2,137	Çärjew District	Bereket geňeşligi
Rowaçlyk		1,537	Çärjew District	Bereket geňeşligi
Täzeaý		1,118	Çärjew District	Bereket geňeşligi
Ýasydepe	G	3,053	Çärjew District	Bereket geňeşligi
Adak		233	Çärjew District	Boýrabap geňeşligi
Baýdakçy		2,074	Çärjew District	Boýrabap geňeşligi
Boýrabap	G	714	Çärjew District	Boýrabap geňeşligi
Galkynyş		828	Çärjew District	Boýrabap geňeşligi
Gaýmakçy		1,635	Çärjew District	Boýrabap geňeşligi
Hojamiresen		5,631	Çärjew District	Boýrabap geňeşligi
Petdeli		191	Çärjew District	Boýrabap geňeşligi
Tally		2,665	Çärjew District	Boýrabap geňeşligi
Çärjew	T	1,825	Çärjew District	Çärjew
Darganly		1,284	Çärjew District	Çärjew
Garawul		1,284	Çärjew District	Çärjew
Marküş		2,979	Çärjew District	Çärjew
Orazaly		1,046	Çärjew District	Çärjew
Ulywahym		2,109	Çärjew District	Çärjew
Ýaňyaryk		687	Çärjew District	Çärjew
Hojagala	T	4,752	Çärjew District	Hojagala
Babadaýhan		1,324	Çärjew District	Hojaili geňeşligi
Bekaryk	G	2,564	Çärjew District	Hojaili geňeşligi
Dogryýap		1,406	Çärjew District	Hojaili geňeşligi
Dostluk		722	Çärjew District	Hojaili geňeşligi
Duryýap		1,805	Çärjew District	Hojaili geňeşligi
Hojaaryk		1,047	Çärjew District	Hojaili geňeşligi
Hojaili		1,467	Çärjew District	Hojaili geňeşligi
Kerpiçli		538	Çärjew District	Hojaili geňeşligi
Pagtaçy		3,384	Çärjew District	Hojaili geňeşligi
Peşelioba		1,176	Çärjew District	Hojaili geňeşligi
Sahyjan		926	Çärjew District	Hojaili geňeşligi
Ýeňiş		2,183	Çärjew District	Hojaili geňeşligi
Bagtyýarlyk		1,784	Çärjew District	Kiştiwan
Garagum		1,877	Çärjew District	Kiştiwan
Ikinji Çärjew		1,013	Çärjew District	Kiştiwan
Kiştiwan	T	5,989	Çärjew District	Kiştiwan
Mekan		924	Çärjew District	Kiştiwan
Miras		2,499	Çärjew District	Kiştiwan
Nebitçi		140	Çärjew District	Kiştiwan
Parahatçylyk		2,401	Çärjew District	Kiştiwan
Ussaçy		662	Çärjew District	Kiştiwan
Ak altyn		188	Çärjew District	Kölaryk geňeşligi
Araplar		1,912	Çärjew District	Kölaryk geňeşligi
Asudalyk		1,778	Çärjew District	Kölaryk geňeşligi
Balykçy		1,094	Çärjew District	Kölaryk geňeşligi
Esgioba		793	Çärjew District	Kölaryk geňeşligi
Joraýew		1,317	Çärjew District	Kölaryk geňeşligi
Kölaryk	G	4,415	Çärjew District	Kölaryk geňeşligi
Könegulançy		1,422	Çärjew District	Kölaryk geňeşligi
Üçbaş		1,046	Çärjew District	Kölaryk geňeşligi
Çömmekdepe		1,402	Çärjew District	Nobat Gutlyýew adyndaky geňeşlik
Çöpligarawul		1,435	Çärjew District	Nobat Gutlyýew adyndaky geňeşlik
Könearyk		1,071	Çärjew District	Nobat Gutlyýew adyndaky geňeşlik
Magtymguly Pyragy		1,206	Çärjew District	Nobat Gutlyýew adyndaky geňeşlik
Nobat Gutlyýew	G	3,606	Çärjew District	Nobat Gutlyýew adyndaky geňeşlik
Owlakdepe		2,184	Çärjew District	Nobat Gutlyýew adyndaky geňeşlik
Saýatly		1,152	Çärjew District	Nobat Gutlyýew adyndaky geňeşlik
Saýatlyoba		916	Çärjew District	Nobat Gutlyýew adyndaky geňeşlik
Täzedurmuş		1,135	Çärjew District	Nobat Gutlyýew adyndaky geňeşlik
Ýaşlar		685	Çärjew District	Nobat Gutlyýew adyndaky geňeşlik
Ýokaryaryk		2,057	Çärjew District	Nobat Gutlyýew adyndaky geňeşlik
Agalaň		1,911	Çärjew District	Sarykbala geňeşligi
Dogryýol		1,321	Çärjew District	Sarykbala geňeşligi
Döwletli		1,234	Çärjew District	Sarykbala geňeşligi
Gagarin		1,239	Çärjew District	Sarykbala geňeşligi
Garawuldepe		1,237	Çärjew District	Sarykbala geňeşligi
Gurluşykçy		233	Çärjew District	Sarykbala geňeşligi
Guýyaryk		949	Çärjew District	Sarykbala geňeşligi
Sarykbala	G	2,328	Çärjew District	Sarykbala geňeşligi
Alagöz		2,577	Çärjew District	Zergär geňeşligi
Arap		1,427	Çärjew District	Zergär geňeşligi
Döwletmämmet Azady		552	Çärjew District	Zergär geňeşligi
Düýeçi		2,353	Çärjew District	Zergär geňeşligi
Gyzylýap	G	2,132	Çärjew District	Zergär geňeşligi
Hojamaşat		1,492	Çärjew District	Zergär geňeşligi
Seýdi		186	Çärjew District	Zergär geňeşligi
Şyhlar		439	Çärjew District	Zergär geňeşligi
Zergär		1,109	Çärjew District	Zergär geňeşligi
Abadan		1,845	Dänew District	Aşgabat geňeşligi
Amyderýa		632	Dänew District	Aşgabat geňeşligi
Aşgabat	G	3,295	Dänew District	Aşgabat geňeşligi
Asuda	T	6,807	Dänew District	Asuda
Çandyroba		1,677	Dänew District	Asuda
Erdel		694	Dänew District	Asuda
Kiçiaryk		619	Dänew District	Asuda
Ataoba		1,547	Dänew District	Azatlyk geňeşligi
Azatlyk	G	2,516	Dänew District	Azatlyk geňeşligi
Bahar	T	3,090	Dänew District	Bahar
Kerpiç zawodynyň şäherjigi		1,048	Dänew District	Bahar
Agar		1,112	Dänew District	Baragyz geňeşligi
Ärsary		987	Dänew District	Baragyz geňeşligi
Baragyz	G	1,000	Dänew District	Baragyz geňeşligi
Gazakçy		148	Dänew District	Baragyz geňeşligi
Berzeň	G	2,116	Dänew District	Berzeň geňeşligi
Derýabaş		1,571	Dänew District	Berzeň geňeşligi
Garaşsyzlyk		631	Dänew District	Berzeň geňeşligi
Händeklioba		2,293	Dänew District	Berzeň geňeşligi
Jendi		1,592	Dänew District	Berzeň geňeşligi
Ulyaryk		815	Dänew District	Berzeň geňeşligi
Boýnyuzyn		2,253	Dänew District	Boýnyuzyn geňeşligi
Durmuşly		1,100	Dänew District	Boýnyuzyn geňeşligi
Kaksaçan	G	2,631	Dänew District	Boýnyuzyn geňeşligi
Kepderili		1,876	Dänew District	Boýnyuzyn geňeşligi
Traktorçy		961	Dänew District	Boýnyuzyn geňeşligi
Ýazaryk		3,026	Dänew District	Boýnyuzyn geňeşligi
Dänew	C	15,409	Dänew District	Dänew
Puşkin		1,179	Dänew District	Döwletabat geňeşligi
Şöhrat		1,095	Dänew District	Döwletabat geňeşligi
Watan	G	3,515	Dänew District	Döwletabat geňeşligi
Ýaşlyk		2,472	Dänew District	Döwletabat geňeşligi
Zergömen		2,472	Dänew District	Döwletabat geňeşligi
Gabakly		2,617	Dänew District	Gabakly geňeşligi
Gabaklyoba	G	365	Dänew District	Gabakly geňeşligi
Halkabat		231	Dänew District	Gabakly geňeşligi
Üçkersen		681	Dänew District	Gabakly geňeşligi
Garaşsyzlyk	T	7,136	Dänew District	Garaşsyzlyk
Goşaköpri		233	Dänew District	Göýnük geňeşligi
Göýnük	G	4,102	Dänew District	Göýnük geňeşligi
Kulyýewa		2,018	Dänew District	Göýnük geňeşligi
Nogaý		369	Dänew District	Göýnük geňeşligi
Şenbebazar		3,295	Dänew District	Göýnük geňeşligi
Isbaz	G	1,892	Dänew District	Isbaz geňeşligi
Täzeýurt		733	Dänew District	Isbaz geňeşligi
Araphana		635	Dänew District	Maý geňeşligi
Bilal		1,080	Dänew District	Maý geňeşligi
Dürýap		982	Dänew District	Maý geňeşligi
Maý	G	5,236	Dänew District	Maý geňeşligi
Mürzegala		876	Dänew District	Maý geňeşligi
Ýolum		821	Dänew District	Maý geňeşligi
Ak altyn		2,186	Dänew District	Ödeý geňeşligi
Belme		601	Dänew District	Ödeý geňeşligi
Çeges		1,101	Dänew District	Ödeý geňeşligi
Garagum		1,473	Dänew District	Ödeý geňeşligi
Ödeý	G	3,626	Dänew District	Ödeý geňeşligi
Seýdi	C	29,670	Dänew District	Seýdi
Dostluk		1,777	Dänew District	Parahat geňeşligi
Parahat	G	4,258	Dänew District	Parahat geňeşligi
Baýat		1,108	Dänew District	Ýyldyz geňeşligi
Gazarçy		978	Dänew District	Ýyldyz geňeşligi
Händekli		773	Dänew District	Ýyldyz geňeşligi
Sazaklyk		981	Dänew District	Ýyldyz geňeşligi
Täzegüýç		1,243	Dänew District	Ýyldyz geňeşligi
Wahym		1,120	Dänew District	Ýyldyz geňeşligi
Ýyldyz	G	1,736	Dänew District	Ýyldyz geňeşligi
Çarwadar	G	2,760	Darganata District	Çarwadar geňeşligi
Darganata	C	13,777	Darganata District	Darganata
Gazojak	C	21,035	Darganata District	Gazojak
Çandyr		1,978	Darganata District	Hojalyk geňeşligi
Hojalyk	G	3,418	Darganata District	Hojalyk geňeşligi
Kyrançoba	G	4,816	Darganata District	Lebap geňeşligi
Sakararyk		2,277	Darganata District	Lebap geňeşligi
Lebap	T	3,058	Darganata District	Lebap
Sazakly		432	Darganata District	Lebap
Ataoba		1,292	Darganata District	Magtymguly geňeşligi
Magtymguly	G	1,057	Darganata District	Magtymguly geňeşligi
Sediwer	G	2,052	Darganata District	Sediwer geňeşligi
Amyderýa	T	10,330	Döwletli District	Amyderýa
Ak altyn		830	Döwletli District	Berkararlyk geňeşligi
Berkararlyk	G	806	Döwletli District	Berkararlyk geňeşligi
Magtymguly		375	Döwletli District	Berkararlyk geňeşligi
Çanakçy		2,980	Döwletli District	Burguçy geňeşligi
Daýhan		1,553	Döwletli District	Burguçy geňeşligi
Hatap	G	2,234	Döwletli District	Burguçy geňeşligi
Olamsurhy		4,571	Döwletli District	Burguçy geňeşligi
Bozarygoba		1,404	Döwletli District	Daşrabat geňeşligi
Daşrabat	G	3,688	Döwletli District	Daşrabat geňeşligi
Güneşli		1,962	Döwletli District	Daşrabat geňeşligi
Sarymeýdan		1,971	Döwletli District	Daşrabat geňeşligi
Ýagtylyk		2,550	Döwletli District	Daşrabat geňeşligi
Dostluk	C	13,655	Döwletli District	Dostluk
Aşgabat		630	Döwletli District	Döwletli
Döwletli	T	4,942	Döwletli District	Döwletli
Garagum		426	Döwletli District	Döwletli
Miras		213	Döwletli District	Döwletli
Gyzguýy		723	Döwletli District	Hojahaýran geňeşligi
Hojagürlük		2,283	Döwletli District	Hojahaýran geňeşligi
Hojahaýran	G	1,117	Döwletli District	Hojahaýran geňeşligi
Hojatutly		932	Döwletli District	Hojahaýran geňeşligi
Körkak		1,648	Döwletli District	Hojahaýran geňeşligi
Kerkiçi	T	14,996	Döwletli District	Kerkiçi
Jeýhun		652	Döwletli District	Pagtaçy geňeşligi
Nowruz		1,309	Döwletli District	Pagtaçy geňeşligi
Pagtaçy	G	1,383	Döwletli District	Pagtaçy geňeşligi
Demirýolçy		112	Döwletli District	Tallymerjen geňeşligi
Sardaba		1,726	Döwletli District	Tallymerjen geňeşligi
Tallymerjen	G	3,399	Döwletli District	Tallymerjen geňeşligi
Lebap		2,901	Döwletli District	Täzedurmuş geňeşligi
Täzedurmuş		1,061	Döwletli District	Täzedurmuş geňeşligi
Watan		99	Döwletli District	Täzedurmuş geňeşligi
Arpasaý		446	Döwletli District	Türkmenistan geňeşligi
Dostluk		238	Döwletli District	Türkmenistan geňeşligi
Garaşsyzlyk		215	Döwletli District	Türkmenistan geňeşligi
Lebap		544	Döwletli District	Türkmenistan geňeşligi
Täzegüýç		282	Döwletli District	Türkmenistan geňeşligi
Tutlykak	G	1,226	Döwletli District	Türkmenistan geňeşligi
Ýaşlyk		606	Döwletli District	Türkmenistan geňeşligi
Ýylgynagyz		312	Döwletli District	Türkmenistan geňeşligi
Baýdak		2,851	Döwletli District	Ýalkym geňeşligi
Surhy	G	4,676	Döwletli District	Ýalkym geňeşligi
Türkmenistan		3,890	Döwletli District	Ýalkym geňeşligi
9-njy Maý		1,556	Farap District	Bitik geňeşligi
Bahar		392	Farap District	Bitik geňeşligi
Bitik		392	Farap District	Bitik geňeşligi
Çarmerde		2,144	Farap District	Bitik geňeşligi
Gülabat		1,685	Farap District	Bitik geňeşligi
Magtymguly	G	2,003	Farap District	Bitik geňeşligi
Täzeýol		1,440	Farap District	Bitik geňeşligi
Ýeketut		1,064	Farap District	Bitik geňeşligi
Farap	C	20,547	Farap District	Farap
Älemdar		1,335	Farap District	Garamyş geňeşligi
Bozarykly		2,351	Farap District	Garamyş geňeşligi
Garamyş	G	1,192	Farap District	Garamyş geňeşligi
Ýolbaşçy		1,044	Farap District	Garamyş geňeşligi
Goýgala	G	3,107	Farap District	Hanoba geňeşligi
Händek		716	Farap District	Hanoba geňeşligi
Parahat		1,490	Farap District	Hanoba geňeşligi
Tuýgun		1,862	Farap District	Hanoba geňeşligi
Akrabat		992	Farap District	Hojakenepsi geňeşligi
Eljik		1,944	Farap District	Hojakenepsi geňeşligi
Hojakenepsi	G	5,181	Farap District	Hojakenepsi geňeşligi
Ýylmangaýa		909	Farap District	Hojakenepsi geňeşligi
Başsaka		616	Farap District	Jendi geňeşligi
Goşaaryk		1,134	Farap District	Jendi geňeşligi
Jendi	G	1,987	Farap District	Jendi geňeşligi
Kündearyk		918	Farap District	Jendi geňeşligi
Sandykly		1,225	Farap District	Jendi geňeşligi
Ýalkym		1,789	Farap District	Jendi geňeşligi
Jeýhun	T	9,496	Farap District	Jeýhun
Kyraç	G	3,033	Farap District	Kyraç geňeşligi
Mergenli		1,214	Farap District	Kyraç geňeşligi
Ýaşlyk		459	Farap District	Kyraç geňeşligi
Gadyn		1,482	Farap District	Osty geňeşligi
Osty	G	2,555	Farap District	Osty geňeşligi
Akgala	G	2,638	Garabekewül District	Akgala geňeşligi
Gutnamgala		840	Garabekewül District	Akgala geňeşligi
Hasyl		1,065	Garabekewül District	Akgala geňeşligi
Kekreli		1,378	Garabekewül District	Akgala geňeşligi
Şalyk		837	Garabekewül District	Akgala geňeşligi
Aşgaly		1,335	Garabekewül District	Ärsarybaba geňeşligi
Haryn	G	2,559	Garabekewül District	Ärsarybaba geňeşligi
Ögem		1,523	Garabekewül District	Ärsarybaba geňeşligi
Baý	G	3,624	Garabekewül District	Baý geňeşligi
Lebap		719	Garabekewül District	Baý geňeşligi
Hojagunduz		1,022	Garabekewül District	Baý geňeşligi
Şaglar		1,350	Garabekewül District	Baý geňeşligi
Abdallar	G	231	Garabekewül District	Dostluk geňeşligi
Bataşjeňňel		520	Garabekewül District	Dostluk geňeşligi
Bozaryk		948	Garabekewül District	Dostluk geňeşligi
Garabekewül	C	15,135	Garabekewül District	Garabekewül
Çakmak	G	1,913	Garabekewül District	Lamma geňeşligi
Täzeoba		2,157	Garabekewül District	Lamma geňeşligi
Garaşýer		112	Garabekewül District	Rahmançäge geňeşligi
Rahmançäge	G	1,111	Garabekewül District	Rahmançäge geňeşligi
Akdepe		645	Garabekewül District	Seýdi geňeşligi
Bürgüt		1,113	Garabekewül District	Seýdi geňeşligi
Garaltaý		1,005	Garabekewül District	Seýdi geňeşligi
Saltyk		1,207	Garabekewül District	Seýdi geňeşligi
Seýdi	G	2,351	Garabekewül District	Seýdi geňeşligi
Şorly		776	Garabekewül District	Seýdi geňeşligi
Soltanýazgala	G	3,547	Garabekewül District	Soltanýazgala geňeşligi
Gumakly		639	Garabekewül District	Yslam
Soltanjeňňel		336	Garabekewül District	Yslam
Yslam	T	4,869	Garabekewül District	Yslam
Gökdepe		1,096	Garabekewül District	Zelili adyndaky geňeşlik
Arygaýak		3,348	Halaç District	Altyn asyr geňeşligi
Baýhalky		3,225	Halaç District	Altyn asyr geňeşligi
Çilan		3,271	Halaç District	Altyn asyr geňeşligi
Kazyaryk	G	1,520	Halaç District	Altyn asyr geňeşligi
Mäşpaýa		4,073	Halaç District	Altyn asyr geňeşligi
Pesti		3,010	Halaç District	Altyn asyr geňeşligi
Bagşyly		4,553	Halaç District	Çohpetde
Çohpetde	T	7,503	Halaç District	Çohpetde
Jeňňel		1,261	Halaç District	Çohpetde
Okçandyr		4,077	Halaç District	Çohpetde
Täzemekan		875	Halaç District	Çohpetde
Akýap		2,726	Halaç District	Esenmeňli geňeşligi
Esenmeňli	G	7,969	Halaç District	Esenmeňli geňeşligi
Magtymguly		5,387	Halaç District	Esenmeňli geňeşligi
Zynhary		2,311	Halaç District	Esenmeňli geňeşligi
Güneşlik	G	2,057	Halaç District	Güneşlik geňeşligi
Azatlyk		3,107	Halaç District	Güýçbirleşik geňeşligi
Güýçbirleşik	G	5,640	Halaç District	Güýçbirleşik geňeşligi
Ajy	G	4,220	Halaç District	Halaç geňeşligi
Azady		3,286	Halaç District	Halaç geňeşligi
Babadaýhan		4,297	Halaç District	Halaç geňeşligi
Garagaç		3,828	Halaç District	Halaç geňeşligi
Jeýhun		766	Halaç District	Halaç geňeşligi
Halaç	C	20,778	Halaç District	Halaç
Etbaş	G	2,551	Halaç District	Oguz han geňeşligi
Maňgyşlaly		2,749	Halaç District	Oguz han geňeşligi
Müsür		939	Halaç District	Oguz han geňeşligi
Gülegenje		2,993	Halaç District	Pelwert geňeşligi
Pelwert	G	5,580	Halaç District	Pelwert geňeşligi
Reýimberdili		3,542	Halaç District	Pelwert geňeşligi
Omargyzylja		4,673	Halaç District	Surh geňeşligi
Surh	G	6,013	Halaç District	Surh geňeşligi
Täzemaksat		1,781	Halaç District	Surh geňeşligi
Beşir	T	6,971	Hojambaz District	Beşir
Boraşly		3,940	Hojambaz District	Beşir
Gabyrdy		3,855	Hojambaz District	Beşir
Garaja		1,444	Hojambaz District	Beşir
Güneş		2,596	Hojambaz District	Beşir
Ýokarkyşor		1,884	Hojambaz District	Beşir
Baýat		2,544	Hojambaz District	Burdalyk geňeşligi
Burdalyk	G	4,558	Hojambaz District	Burdalyk geňeşligi
Babadaýhan	G	639	Hojambaz District	Galkynyş geňeşligi
Eleç		3,512	Hojambaz District	Galkynyş geňeşligi
Tölekguýy		1,530	Hojambaz District	Galkynyş geňeşligi
Ýaşlyk		1,530	Hojambaz District	Galkynyş geňeşligi
Bekewül		893	Hojambaz District	Gultak geňeşligi
Buýankökçi		272	Hojambaz District	Gultak geňeşligi
Gultak	G	3,709	Hojambaz District	Gultak geňeşligi
Isamly		1,214	Hojambaz District	Gultak geňeşligi
Ýabanyoba		601	Hojambaz District	Gultak geňeşligi
Çalyşlar	G	2,729	Hojambaz District	Gyzylgum geňeşligi
Çekiç		2,924	Hojambaz District	Gyzylgum geňeşligi
Gazanaryk		2,204	Hojambaz District	Gyzylgum geňeşligi
Hojambaz	C	13,485	Hojambaz District	Hojambaz
Egriýagyr		1,314	Hojambaz District	Kyrköýli geňeşligi
Gülüstan		749	Hojambaz District	Kyrköýli geňeşligi
Kyrköýli	G	4,373	Hojambaz District	Kyrköýli geňeşligi
Abdal		1,260	Hojambaz District	Mekan geňeşligi
Altynkök		465	Hojambaz District	Mekan geňeşligi
Dänajy		1,107	Hojambaz District	Mekan geňeşligi
Mekan	G	2,524	Hojambaz District	Mekan geňeşligi
Müsür		1,454	Hojambaz District	Mekan geňeşligi
Sabynly		3,962	Hojambaz District	Surhy geňeşligi
Surhy	G	2,529	Hojambaz District	Surhy geňeşligi
Astanababa	T	11,466	Kerki District	Astanababa
Botaýer		5,468	Kerki District	Astanababa
Gabşal		8,121	Kerki District	Astanababa
Sopyýer		931	Kerki District	Astanababa
Başsaka	T	3,498	Kerki District	Başsaka
Könebaşsaka		1,736	Kerki District	Başsaka
Çekir	G	8,155	Kerki District	Çekir geňeşligi
Etbaşoba		644	Kerki District	Çekir geňeşligi
Gabasakgal		8,666	Kerki District	Çekir geňeşligi
Garaja		3,987	Kerki District	Çekir geňeşligi
Güýç		5,196	Kerki District	Çekir geňeşligi
Jeňňel		1,974	Kerki District	Çekir geňeşligi
Daşlyk	G	3,327	Kerki District	Daşlyk geňeşligi
Lebap		3,001	Kerki District	Daşlyk geňeşligi
Tokaýçylar		624	Kerki District	Daşlyk geňeşligi
Ussalar		4,717	Kerki District	Daşlyk geňeşligi
Garamätnyýaz	T	1,844	Kerki District	Garamätnyýaz
Niçge		854	Kerki District	Garamätnyýaz
Garaşsyzlygyň 15 ýyllygy	T	1,598	Kerki District	Garaşsyzlygyň 15 ýyllygy
Gülüstan		203	Kerki District	Garaşsyzlygyň 15 ýyllygy
Güneşoba		877	Kerki District	Guwak geňeşligi
Guwak	G	4,534	Kerki District	Guwak geňeşligi
Mukryoba		2,455	Kerki District	Guwak geňeşligi
Mürzebeg		2,199	Kerki District	Guwak geňeşligi
Bazarjaý		377	Kerki District	Gyzylaýak geňeşligi
Parahat		551	Kerki District	Gyzylaýak geňeşligi
Gyzylaýak		5,293	Kerki District	Gyzylaýak geňeşligi
Çömmeklihatap		880	Kerki District	Hatap geňeşligi
Galaly		1,781	Kerki District	Hatap geňeşligi
Galalyaryk		1,486	Kerki District	Hatap geňeşligi
Hatap	G	829	Kerki District	Hatap geňeşligi
Jeňňellihatap		1,202	Kerki District	Hatap geňeşligi
Mukryaryk		1,599	Kerki District	Hatap geňeşligi
Kerki	C	32,489	Kerki District	Kerki
Akgumolam	G	5,977	Köýtendag District	Akgumolam geňeşligi
Aýrybaba		662	Köýtendag District	Çärjew geňeşligi
Çärjew	G	1,311	Köýtendag District	Çärjew geňeşligi
Ýürekdepe		399	Köýtendag District	Çärjew geňeşligi
Garahowuz	G	3,128	Köýtendag District	Garahowuz geňeşligi
Garlyk		879	Köýtendag District	Garlyk
Garlyk	T	16	Köýtendag District	Garlyk
Hojak		144	Köýtendag District	Garlyk
Künjek		735	Köýtendag District	Garlyk
Balh		2,111	Köýtendag District	Garnas geňeşligi
Çarşaňňy		2,601	Köýtendag District	Garnas geňeşligi
Garabagşyly		2,810	Köýtendag District	Garnas geňeşligi
Garnas	G	1,804	Köýtendag District	Garnas geňeşligi
Garrygala	G	614	Köýtendag District	Garrygala geňeşligi
Gökmiýar		718	Köýtendag District	Garrygala geňeşligi
Gurşun magdan käni	T	3,953	Köýtendag District	Gurşun magdan käni
Kelif	T	3,701	Köýtendag District	Kelif
Mes		163	Köýtendag District	Kelif
Bazardepe		698	Köýtendag District	Köýten geňeşligi
Gyzylaý		1,000	Köýtendag District	Köýten geňeşligi
Hojeýpil		1,047	Köýtendag District	Köýten geňeşligi
Köýten	G	3,535	Köýtendag District	Köýten geňeşligi
Leýlimekan		932	Köýtendag District	Köýten geňeşligi
Täzeçarwa		728	Köýtendag District	Köýten geňeşligi
Köýtendag	C	18,816	Köýtendag District	Köýtendag
Magdanly	C	44,508	Köýtendag District	Magdanly
Akderi		1,264	Köýtendag District	Megejik geňeşligi
Gumpetde		2,127	Köýtendag District	Megejik geňeşligi
Megejik	G	3,457	Köýtendag District	Megejik geňeşligi
Şagundy		752	Köýtendag District	Megejik geňeşligi
Mukry	T	7,013	Köýtendag District	Mukry
Ters	G	3,618	Köýtendag District	Ters geňeşligi
Zarpçy	G	1,297	Köýtendag District	Zarpçy geňeşligi
Awçy	G	3,181	Saýat District	Awçy geňeşligi
Lebapoba		3,258	Saýat District	Awçy geňeşligi
Nerezim		1,032	Saýat District	Awçy geňeşligi
Nurbak		1,333	Saýat District	Awçy geňeşligi
Bakjaçylar	G	2,767	Saýat District	Bakjaçy geňeşligi
Çaltut	T	4,857	Saýat District	Çaltut
Görelde		1,830	Saýat District	Çaltut
Gyzylýarymaý		790	Saýat District	Çarbagdepe geňeşligi
Miweçiler		1,000	Saýat District	Çarbagdepe geňeşligi
Tejribeçiler	G	1,761	Saýat District	Çarbagdepe geňeşligi
Azatlyk		957	Saýat District	Çekiç geňeşligi
Bagtyýarlyk		1,440	Saýat District	Çekiç geňeşligi
Çekiçler	G	2,000	Saýat District	Çekiç geňeşligi
Çowdur	G	3,208	Saýat District	Çowdur geňeşligi
Garagum		2,243	Saýat District	Çowdur geňeşligi
Saýatly		2,115	Saýat District	Çowdur geňeşligi
Watan		1,630	Saýat District	Çowdur geňeşligi
Esli		2,542	Saýat District	Esgi geňeşligi
Gyzylgaýa	G	4,278	Saýat District	Esgi geňeşligi
Ýagtyýol		1,793	Saýat District	Esgi geňeşligi
Ak altyn		1,357	Saýat District	Garamahmyt geňeşligi
Babadaýhan	G	2,140	Saýat District	Garamahmyt geňeşligi
Alpanoba	G	1,235	Saýat District	Hojainebeg geňeşligi
Täzeýol		1,329	Saýat District	Hojainebeg geňeşligi
Bereketli	G	3,006	Saýat District	Jeňňel geňeşligi
Gulançy		1,348	Saýat District	Jeňňel geňeşligi
Gutjuly		763	Saýat District	Jeňňel geňeşligi
Raýdaşlyk		1,190	Saýat District	Jeňňel geňeşligi
Ýaşlyk		1,126	Saýat District	Jeňňel geňeşligi
Gawunçy		600	Saýat District	Lebaby geňeşligi
Guşçy		945	Saýat District	Lebaby geňeşligi
Kelteýap		1,180	Saýat District	Lebaby geňeşligi
Lebaby	G	2,147	Saýat District	Lebaby geňeşligi
Alpan		2,002	Saýat District	Merýe geňeşligi
Goşdepe	G	2,940	Saýat District	Merýe geňeşligi
Hazarekdepe		2,208	Saýat District	Merýe geňeşligi
Bitaraplyk		1,310	Saýat District	Mülk geňeşligi
Bujak		2,053	Saýat District	Mülk geňeşligi
Garkyn		1,850	Saýat District	Mülk geňeşligi
Guşçulyk		369	Saýat District	Mülk geňeşligi
Gyzan		3,791	Saýat District	Mülk geňeşligi
Mülk	G	1,647	Saýat District	Mülk geňeşligi
Sakar	C	12,769	Saýat District	Sakar
Saýat	C	21,619	Saýat District	Saýat
Suwçyoba	T	1,758	Saýat District	Suwçyoba
Dostluk		2,133	Saýat District	Syýadagsakar geňeşligi
Hasylçy		1,404	Saýat District	Syýadagsakar geňeşligi
Syýadagsakar	G	2,890	Saýat District	Syýadagsakar geňeşligi
Täzelikçi	G	1,605	Saýat District	Täzelikçi geňeşligi
Topurkak	G	818	Saýat District	Topurkak geňeşligi
Ýeňiş	G	2,535	Saýat District	Ýeňiş geňeşligi
Türkmenabat	C	230,861	Türkmenabat	Türkmenabat
Daýhan		2,482	Baýramaly	Agaýusup adyndaky geňeşlik
Döwletli		2,067	Baýramaly	Agaýusup adyndaky geňeşlik
Şöhrat	G	4,848	Baýramaly	Agaýusup adyndaky geňeşlik
Azat	G	5,139	Baýramaly	Azat geňeşligi
Dogryýap		4,158	Baýramaly	Azat geňeşligi
Hazarly		949	Baýramaly	Azat geňeşligi
Pagtasaraý		1,645	Baýramaly	Azat geňeşligi
Türkmenistan		1,645	Baýramaly	Azat geňeşligi
Bagt	G	2,929	Baýramaly	Bagt geňeşligi
Çöplidepe		1,607	Baýramaly	Bagt geňeşligi
Kenar		1,156	Baýramaly	Bagt geňeşligi
Täzegüýç		2,799	Baýramaly	Bagt geňeşligi
Bagtyýarlyk	T	1,727	Baýramaly	Bagtyýarlyk
Baglyoba		1,581	Baýramaly	Bahar geňeşligi
Bahar	G	5,446	Baýramaly	Bahar geňeşligi
Berkarar	T	1,408	Baýramaly	Berkarar
Beýikköpri	G	1,179	Baýramaly	Beýikköpri geňeşligi
Depgin		5,028	Baýramaly	Beýikköpri geňeşligi
Düýeçöken		2,867	Baýramaly	Beýikköpri geňeşligi
Kanal		503	Baýramaly	Beýikköpri geňeşligi
Odunçy		686	Baýramaly	Beýikköpri geňeşligi
Erkana	G	3,218	Baýramaly	Erkana geňeşligi
Göksuw		2,340	Baýramaly	Erkana geňeşligi
Çepekýap		1,659	Baýramaly	Gadyrýap geňeşligi
Erikli		1,056	Baýramaly	Gadyrýap geňeşligi
Gadyrýap	G	11,436	Baýramaly	Gadyrýap geňeşligi
Galkynyş		622	Baýramaly	Gadyrýap geňeşligi
Aryk	G	6,610	Baýramaly	Gatakar geňeşligi
Görelde		4,673	Baýramaly	Gatakar geňeşligi
Mülk		908	Baýramaly	Gatakar geňeşligi
Türkmen Goşun		1,968	Baýramaly	Gatakar geňeşligi
Çöpli		1,839	Baýramaly	Guşlyoba geňeşligi
Gurbangala		171	Baýramaly	Guşlyoba geňeşligi
Guşlyoba	G	2,281	Baýramaly	Guşlyoba geňeşligi
Gutlamgala		423	Baýramaly	Guşlyoba geňeşligi
Garaýörme	G	7,670	Baýramaly	Hangala geňeşligi
Höwesli		4,822	Baýramaly	Höwesli geňeşligi
Kyrkdepe		1,060	Baýramaly	Höwesli geňeşligi
Garaja		721	Baýramaly	Mekan
Harsaňly		1,897	Baýramaly	Mekan
Mekan	T	12,115	Baýramaly	Mekan
Gäwürgala		801	Baýramaly	Merw geňeşligi
Merw	G	12,183	Baýramaly	Merw geňeşligi
Birleşik		992	Baýramaly	Murgap geňeşligi
Murgap	G	4,181	Baýramaly	Murgap geňeşligi
Tutly		452	Baýramaly	Murgap geňeşligi
Ylham		3,107	Baýramaly	Murgap geňeşligi
Bereket		3,755	Baýramaly	Ýalkym geňeşligi
Rafsanjani		2,550	Baýramaly	Ýalkym geňeşligi
Şereket		1,894	Baýramaly	Ýalkym geňeşligi
Täzeoba		703	Baýramaly	Ýalkym geňeşligi
Tokaýly		664	Baýramaly	Ýalkym geňeşligi
Uçgun		1,226	Baýramaly	Ýalkym geňeşligi
Ýalkym	G	8,518	Baýramaly	Ýalkym geňeşligi
Ýaýlak		3,475	Baýramaly	Ýalkym geňeşligi
Ýylgynly		1,088	Baýramaly	Ýalkym geňeşligi
Baýramaly	C	70,376	Baýramaly	Baýramaly
Abaýtöş		4,706	Garagum	Akmeýdan geňeşligi
Akmeýdan	G	6,413	Garagum	Akmeýdan geňeşligi
Geçigyran		1,111	Garagum	Akmeýdan geňeşligi
Gurtludepe		3,061	Garagum	Akmeýdan geňeşligi
Kişman		1,433	Garagum	Akmeýdan geňeşligi
Atlyýatan		4,038	Garagum	Durnalyýap geňeşligi
Türkmenistan	G	933	Garagum	Durnalyýap geňeşligi
Göbekli	G	2,741	Garagum	Göbeklidepe geňeşligi
Ýasydepe		3,137	Garagum	Göbeklidepe geňeşligi
Sähra	G	2,673	Garagum	Sähra geňeşligi
Durnaly		1,884	Garagum	Şatlyk geňeşligi
Şatlyk	G	5,828	Garagum	Şatlyk geňeşligi
Akjadepe	G	2,387	Garagum	Tarpýer geňeşligi
Erez		1,666	Garagum	Tarpýer geňeşligi
Täzeoba	G	4,183	Garagum	Täzeoba geňeşligi
Garajadepe		1,904	Garagum	Ýagtyýol
Guýruklydepe		1,991	Garagum	Ýagtyýol
Munan		1,641	Garagum	Ýagtyýol
Ýagtyýol	T	10,488	Garagum	Ýagtyýol
Akgoňur		7,007	Mary	Abadanlyk geňeşligi
Garadepe	G	11,152	Mary	Abadanlyk geňeşligi
Arykperreň	G	5,782	Mary	Adalat geňeşligi
Ajap Mämmedowa	G	5,274	Mary	Ajap Mämmedowa adyndaky geňeşlik
Gurtzäkir		4,519	Mary	Ajap Mämmedowa adyndaky geňeşlik
Ýaýlagaraahmet		4,926	Mary	Ajap Mämmedowa adyndaky geňeşlik
Gurama	G	9,226	Mary	Ak altyn geňeşligi
Goşaja		1,555	Mary	Akmyrat Hümmedow adyndaky geňeşlik
Hojaýap	G	7,346	Mary	Akmyrat Hümmedow adyndaky geňeşlik
Akybaý	G	12,462	Mary	Akybaý geňeşligi
8-nji Mart		4,504	Mary	Aşgabat geňeşligi
Ata		4,939	Mary	Aşgabat geňeşligi
Egrigüzer		5,602	Mary	Aşgabat geňeşligi
Gowkyzereň	G	5,616	Mary	Aşgabat geňeşligi
Döwletli	G	4,887	Mary	Atabaýew adyndaky geňeşlik
Babasary	G	9,475	Mary	Babasary geňeşligi
Garainjik		3,585	Mary	Diýar geňeşligi
Kelteler	G	4,989	Mary	Diýar geňeşligi
Hanutamyş		2,264	Mary	Jemgyýet geňeşligi
Jemgyýet		2,570	Mary	Jemgyýet geňeşligi
Müjewür	G	4,331	Mary	Jemgyýet geňeşligi
Mykgy Lorsy	G	10,498	Mary	Mykgy Lorsy adyndaky geňeşlik
Peşanaly	G	7,910	Mary	Peşanaly geňeşligi
Peşanaly	T	935	Mary	Peşanaly
Mülksyçmaz	G	8,771	Mary	Ruhubelent geňeşligi
Saparmyrat Türkmenbaşy	T	13,251	Mary	Saparmyrat Türkmenbaşy
Aköýli		301	Mary	Täzegüýç geňeşligi
Söýünaly		1,619	Mary	Täzegüýç geňeşligi
Täzeoba	G	4,031	Mary	Täzegüýç geňeşligi
Gojuklar	G	3,813	Mary	Türkmen ýoly geňeşligi
Mary	C	167,027	Mary	Mary
Köşk	G	6,238	Murgap	Azatlyk geňeşligi
Çäçdepe	G	12,784	Murgap	Çäçdepe geňeşligi
Arygoba		5,888	Murgap	Çöňür geňeşligi
Çöňür	G	3,820	Murgap	Çöňür geňeşligi
Täzeoba		2,897	Murgap	Çöňür geňeşligi
Çemçedepe	G	5,042	Murgap	Galkynyş geňeşligi
Gatyýap	G	5,293	Murgap	Gatyýap geňeşligi
Suhtyýap		2,769	Murgap	Gatyýap geňeşligi
Amaşaýap		5,035	Murgap	Gökdepe geňeşligi
Gökdepe	G	6,767	Murgap	Gökdepe geňeşligi
Akýer		1,870	Murgap	Gowşutbent geňeşligi
Bentlioba		582	Murgap	Gowşutbent geňeşligi
Garaşsyzlyk		1,079	Murgap	Gowşutbent geňeşligi
Penjiwar	G	6,841	Murgap	Gowşutbent geňeşligi
Gylyçdurdy Sähetmyradow	G	8,716	Murgap	Gylyçdurdy Sähetmyradow adyndaky geňeşlik
Hyrslan Jumaýew	G	12,744	Murgap	Hyrslan Jumaýew adyndaky geňeşlik
Gowkuzereň	G	7,064	Murgap	Miras geňeşligi
Gökleň		3,502	Murgap	Mülkýazy geňeşligi
Gülperi		776	Murgap	Mülkýazy geňeşligi
Mülkýazy	G	10,377	Murgap	Mülkýazy geňeşligi
Murgap	C	14,822	Murgap	Murgap
Amaşa		3,863	Murgap	Rowaçlyk geňeşligi
Rowaçlyk	G	3,865	Murgap	Rowaçlyk geňeşligi
Meýletinlik		4,262	Murgap	Şordepe geňeşligi
Şordepe	G	3,942	Murgap	Şordepe geňeşligi
Ýagtylyk		4,752	Murgap	Şordepe geňeşligi
Birleşik		3,750	Murgap	Suhty geňeşligi
Goşaköpri		3,023	Murgap	Suhty geňeşligi
Mülkaman		3,306	Murgap	Suhty geňeşligi
Suhty	G	4,180	Murgap	Suhty geňeşligi
Daşaýak		2,663	Murgap	Watan geňeşligi
Watan	G	6,552	Murgap	Watan geňeşligi
Gojukkölýap	G	5,113	Murgap	Ylham geňeşligi
Lälezar	G	2,752	Oguzhan	Altyn zaman geňeşligi
Deňizhan	G	1,851	Oguzhan	Deňizhan geňeşligi
Deňizhan	T	4,686	Oguzhan	Deňizhan
Kiçi Hanhowuz		40	Oguzhan	Deňizhan
Sähra		135	Oguzhan	Deňizhan
Agzybirlik		539	Oguzhan	Dostluk geňeşligi
Dostluk	G	2,360	Oguzhan	Dostluk geňeşligi
Döwletli zaman	T	982	Oguzhan	Döwletli zaman
Aýhan		152	Oguzhan	Gökhan geňeşligi
Daghan		484	Oguzhan	Gökhan geňeşligi
Gökhan	G	1,272	Oguzhan	Gökhan geňeşligi
Günhan		499	Oguzhan	Gökhan geňeşligi
Azatlyk	G	1,588	Oguzhan	Merdana geňeşligi
Oguzhan	T	6,430	Oguzhan	Oguzhan
Parahat	T	2,494	Oguzhan	Parahat
Şatlyk	C	7,725	Oguzhan	Şatlyk
Ýyldyzhan	G	1,860	Oguzhan	Ýyldyzhan geňeşligi
Agzybir		5,730	Sakarçäge	Agzybir geňeşligi
Arkadag	G	4,574	Sakarçäge	Agzybir geňeşligi
Akýap	G	5,920	Sakarçäge	Akýap geňeşligi
Çetili		4,871	Sakarçäge	Akýap geňeşligi
Bereket	G	6,092	Sakarçäge	Bereket geňeşligi
Çaşgyn	G	15,470	Sakarçäge	Çaşgyn geňeşligi
Çerkezköl	G	12,976	Sakarçäge	Çerkezköl geňeşligi
Alajagöz		4,772	Sakarçäge	Daýhan geňeşligi
Dogryýol	G	6,369	Sakarçäge	Daýhan geňeşligi
Garaýap	G	9,852	Sakarçäge	Garaýap geňeşligi
Aýnaköl		3,914	Sakarçäge	Görelde geňeşligi
Görelde	G	4,129	Sakarçäge	Görelde geňeşligi
Bagşy	G	4,777	Sakarçäge	Gorgangala geňeşligi
Gülüstan		5,164	Sakarçäge	Gülüstan geňeşligi
Hakykat	G	4,851	Sakarçäge	Gülüstan geňeşligi
Dörtguýy		62	Sakarçäge	Gumgüzer geňeşligi
Garybata		4,374	Sakarçäge	Gumgüzer geňeşligi
Gumgüzer	G	7,865	Sakarçäge	Gumgüzer geňeşligi
Böri	G	6,242	Sakarçäge	Gyzylgum geňeşligi
Daňatar Sähedow		4,943	Sakarçäge	Gyzylgum geňeşligi
Gyzylgum		3,934	Sakarçäge	Gyzylgum geňeşligi
Mawyteber		4,350	Sakarçäge	Gyzylgum geňeşligi
Hojadepe	G	5,761	Sakarçäge	Hojadepe geňeşligi
Keseýap	G	10,519	Sakarçäge	Keseýap geňeşligi
Düýedarçylyk	G	3,542	Sakarçäge	Sakarçäge geňeşligi
Gökgümmez		153	Sakarçäge	Sakarçäge geňeşligi
Sakarçäge	C	11,891	Sakarçäge	Sakarçäge
Kyrköýli		2,206	Sakarçäge	Soltanyz geňeşligi
Soltanyz	G	2,972	Sakarçäge	Soltanyz geňeşligi
Söýünsary	G	8,119	Sakarçäge	Söýünsary geňeşligi
Ahal	G	2,724	Tagtabazar	Ahal geňeşligi
Çemenabat	G	3,250	Tagtabazar	Çemenabat geňeşligi
Daşköpri	G	2,243	Tagtabazar	Daşköpri geňeşligi
Dostluk		2,134	Tagtabazar	Erden geňeşligi
Erden	G	8,604	Tagtabazar	Erden geňeşligi
Galaýmor	G	4,067	Tagtabazar	Galaýmor geňeşligi
Orazbaba		84	Tagtabazar	Galaýmor geňeşligi
Akgaýa		1,519	Tagtabazar	Gulja geňeşligi
Düldülahyr		3,066	Tagtabazar	Gulja geňeşligi
Gulja	G	6,410	Tagtabazar	Gulja geňeşligi
Gyzyl Gojaly		3,813	Tagtabazar	Gulja geňeşligi
Başbedeň		2,230	Tagtabazar	Marçak geňeşligi
Durdyýew	G	8,682	Tagtabazar	Marçak geňeşligi
Gojaly		2,805	Tagtabazar	Marçak geňeşligi
Suhty	G	9,865	Tagtabazar	Pendi geňeşligi
Zähmetkeş		1,603	Tagtabazar	Pendi geňeşligi
27-nji oktýabr		938	Tagtabazar	Sandykgaçy geňeşligi
Bagçylyk		1,743	Tagtabazar	Sandykgaçy geňeşligi
Sandykgaçy	G	4,488	Tagtabazar	Sandykgaçy geňeşligi
Baýraç	G	8,658	Tagtabazar	Saparmyrat Nyýazow adyndaky geňeşlik
Saryýazy	G	5,204	Tagtabazar	Saryýazy geňeşligi
Serhetabat	C	16,038	Tagtabazar	Serhetabat
Akrabat		35	Tagtabazar	Serhetçi geňeşligi
Parahat		459	Tagtabazar	Serhetçi geňeşligi
Serhetçi	G	3,372	Tagtabazar	Serhetçi geňeşligi
Bedeň		3,851	Tagtabazar	Söýünaly geňeşligi
Söýünaly	G	4,972	Tagtabazar	Söýünaly geňeşligi
Tagtabazar	T	13,312	Tagtabazar	Tagtabazar
Üzümli		535	Tagtabazar	Üzümçilik geňeşligi
Ýaşlyk	G	5,725	Tagtabazar	Üzümçilik geňeşligi
Ýeňiş	G	2,322	Tagtabazar	Ýeňiş geňeşligi
Dörttamly		836	Türkmengala	Gatlaly geňeşligi
Gatlaly	G	1,883	Türkmengala	Gatlaly geňeşligi
Gümmezli		1,385	Türkmengala	Gatlaly geňeşligi
Hasyl	G	3,786	Türkmengala	Hasyl geňeşligi
Agzygara		4,019	Türkmengala	Kemine geňeşligi
Döwlet		2,477	Türkmengala	Kemine geňeşligi
Kemine	G	8,477	Türkmengala	Kemine geňeşligi
Mürzeçäge		1,818	Türkmengala	Kemine geňeşligi
Amaşaýap	G	2,105	Türkmengala	Magtymguly adyndaky geňeşlik
Ikinjibent		204	Türkmengala	Magtymguly adyndaky geňeşlik
Seýidoba		1,242	Türkmengala	Magtymguly adyndaky geňeşlik
Ýaboba		3,051	Türkmengala	Magtymguly adyndaky geňeşlik
Burkaz		133	Türkmengala	Rehnet geňeşligi
Çowdur		4,005	Türkmengala	Rehnet geňeşligi
Erkana	G	3,466	Türkmengala	Rehnet geňeşligi
Goşgyzyl		172	Türkmengala	Rehnet geňeşligi
Tutluk		1,152	Türkmengala	Rehnet geňeşligi
Üçünjibent		183	Türkmengala	Rehnet geňeşligi
Ýalkym		1,634	Türkmengala	Rehnet geňeşligi
Babakese		471	Türkmengala	Serdarýap geňeşligi
Rahat	G	8,421	Türkmengala	Serdarýap geňeşligi
Ruhubelent		277	Türkmengala	Serdarýap geňeşligi
Serdarýap		1,621	Türkmengala	Serdarýap geňeşligi
Ärsary	G	3,660	Türkmengala	Seýitnazar Seýdi adyndaky geňeşlik
Garamüňňüş		2,765	Türkmengala	Seýitnazar Seýdi adyndaky geňeşlik
Kyrkalaň		488	Türkmengala	Soltanýap geňeşligi
Ýyldyz	G	5,108	Türkmengala	Soltanýap geňeşligi
Çaňlybent	G	5,089	Türkmengala	Täzedaýhan geňeşligi
Hindiguş		1,226	Türkmengala	Täzedaýhan geňeşligi
Kyrkişik		5,282	Türkmengala	Täzedünýä geňeşligi
Ýagty	G	6,077	Türkmengala	Täzedünýä geňeşligi
Ýaşlar		342	Türkmengala	Täzedünýä geňeşligi
Aryklar		1,756	Türkmengala	Täzeýol geňeşligi
Birleşik		871	Türkmengala	Täzeýol geňeşligi
Gumly		894	Türkmengala	Täzeýol geňeşligi
Haryn	G	4,259	Türkmengala	Täzeýol geňeşligi
Türkmengala	C	16,696	Türkmengala	Türkmengala
Bäşinjibent		541	Türkmengala	Zähmet
Zähmet	T	3,855	Türkmengala	Zähmet
Zähmet bekedi		5,356	Türkmengala	Zähmet
Buluçlyk		2,856	Türkmengala	Zähmet geňeşligi
Kälçe	G	3,655	Türkmengala	Zähmet geňeşligi
Kiçikälçe		1,048	Türkmengala	Zähmet geňeşligi
Akgoňur		4,861	Wekilbazar	Akgoňur geňeşligi
Goňur	G	4,950	Wekilbazar	Akgoňur geňeşligi
Narlyoba		3,824	Wekilbazar	Akgoňur geňeşligi
Ýagtylyk		4,647	Wekilbazar	Akgoňur geňeşligi
Watan	G	10,660	Wekilbazar	Alladurdy Gandymow adyndaky geňeşlik
Aýgyt		2,243	Wekilbazar	Çarlakýap geňeşligi
Çarlakýap	G	4,877	Wekilbazar	Çarlakýap geňeşligi
Diňli		2,477	Wekilbazar	Çarlakýap geňeşligi
Bent		208	Wekilbazar	Egrigüzer geňeşligi
Egrigüzer	G	10,557	Wekilbazar	Egrigüzer geňeşligi
Arzuw	G	5,341	Wekilbazar	Gökje geňeşligi
Bagşy		2,361	Wekilbazar	Gökje geňeşligi
Garagökje		5,431	Wekilbazar	Gökje geňeşligi
Garagoňur	G	6,331	Wekilbazar	Goňur geňeşligi
Nurana		3,555	Wekilbazar	Goňur geňeşligi
Halyl	G	7,414	Wekilbazar	Halyl geňeşligi
Çebisgen		240	Wekilbazar	Jumadurdy Atajanow adyndaky geňeşlik
Garajaköw		3,316	Wekilbazar	Jumadurdy Atajanow adyndaky geňeşlik
Haşyrdyk		8,443	Wekilbazar	Jumadurdy Atajanow adyndaky geňeşlik
Işçi		2,619	Wekilbazar	Jumadurdy Atajanow adyndaky geňeşlik
Jumadurdy Atajanow	G	8,287	Wekilbazar	Jumadurdy Atajanow adyndaky geňeşlik
Mollanepes	T	2,878	Wekilbazar	Mollanepes
Üçdepe		1,306	Wekilbazar	Mollanepes
Gara	G	10,901	Wekilbazar	Mollanepes adyndaky geňeşlik
Kümüşçi		845	Wekilbazar	Mülkamaşa geňeşligi
Magtymguly	G	9,098	Wekilbazar	Mülkamaşa geňeşligi
Mülkbükri	G	10,899	Wekilbazar	Mülkbükri geňeşligi
Kaklydepe		2,760	Wekilbazar	Mülkýusup geňeşligi
Mülkýusup	G	3,188	Wekilbazar	Mülkýusup geňeşligi
Parahatlyk		4,100	Wekilbazar	Mülkýusup geňeşligi
Göreş		3,066	Wekilbazar	Rysgally geňeşligi
Türkmenistan	G	6,778	Wekilbazar	Rysgally geňeşligi
Döwletli		2,889	Wekilbazar	Täzedurmuş geňeşligi
Täzedurmuş	G	4,552	Wekilbazar	Täzedurmuş geňeşligi
Wekilbazar	T	2,832	Wekilbazar	Wekilbazar
Agzybirlik	G	4,542	Ýolöten	Agzybirlik geňeşligi
Söýünalybedeň		4,774	Ýolöten	Agzybirlik geňeşligi
Täzeýap		1,326	Ýolöten	Agzybirlik geňeşligi
Alamdepe		990	Ýolöten	Ahunbaba geňeşligi
Bagtyýarlyk		3,373	Ýolöten	Ahunbaba geňeşligi
Tokaýçy		1,920	Ýolöten	Ahunbaba geňeşligi
Zindigani	G	6,175	Ýolöten	Ahunbaba geňeşligi
Akgüzer	G	2,926	Ýolöten	Akgüzer geňeşligi
Bozýatan		1 889	Ýolöten	Akgüzer geňeşligi
Lälezar		1,336	Ýolöten	Akgüzer geňeşligi
Azatlyk	G	2,490	Ýolöten	Arkadag geňeşligi
Galkynyş		2,904	Ýolöten	Baýraç geňeşligi
Janybek	G	4,574	Ýolöten	Baýraç geňeşligi
Ýerki		1,490	Ýolöten	Baýraç geňeşligi
Döwletli	G	3,533	Ýolöten	Döwletli geňeşligi
Garaköl	G	2,474	Ýolöten	Garaköl geňeşligi
Gazyklybent		1,030	Ýolöten	Garaköl geňeşligi
Gammarbaba		4,254	Ýolöten	Gammarbaba geňeşligi
Gammarýap		2,425	Ýolöten	Gammarbaba geňeşligi
Ýeňiş	G	4,074	Ýolöten	Gammarbaba geňeşligi
Gadyr		2,338	Ýolöten	Goýunjy geňeşligi
Goýunjy	G	4,197	Ýolöten	Goýunjy geňeşligi
Hakykat	G	7,833	Ýolöten	Hakykat geňeşligi
Bereket		1,080	Ýolöten	Hüjüm geňeşligi
Hüjüm	G	4,034	Ýolöten	Hüjüm geňeşligi
Momataý	G	3,323	Ýolöten	Momataý geňeşligi
Talhatanbaba		2,670	Ýolöten	Momataý geňeşligi
Üçköpri		883	Ýolöten	Momataý geňeşligi
Alnyş		1,539	Ýolöten	Rahat geňeşligi
Awçy	G	2,317	Ýolöten	Rahat geňeşligi
Gulanly		852	Ýolöten	Rahat geňeşligi
Rahatýap		1,588	Ýolöten	Rahat geňeşligi
Şöhrat	G	3,876	Ýolöten	Şöhrat geňeşligi
Daýhanbent		499	Ýolöten	Soltanbent geňeşligi
Dostluk	G	6,767	Ýolöten	Soltanbent geňeşligi
Hojaköw		619	Ýolöten	Soltanbent geňeşligi
Şark		2,100	Ýolöten	Soltanbent geňeşligi
Soltanbent		2,290	Ýolöten	Soltanbent geňeşligi
Täzeýer		296	Ýolöten	Soltanbent geňeşligi
Nyýazow		1,208	Ýolöten	Ymambaba geňeşligi
Ymambaba	G	5,224	Ýolöten	Ymambaba geňeşligi
Altyn toprak		432	Ýolöten	Ýokary Suhty geňeşligi
Atçapar		1,883	Ýolöten	Ýokary Suhty geňeşligi
Gojaly		2,322	Ýolöten	Ýokary Suhty geňeşligi
Taňrygazan		2,549	Ýolöten	Ýokary Suhty geňeşligi
Ýokary Suhty	G	3,689	Ýolöten	Ýokary Suhty geňeşligi
Ýolöten	C	30,709	Ýolöten	Ýolöten

== Lists by province ==
Here are shorter lists for more selective data.

- Cities of Turkmenistan
- Towns of Turkmenistan
- List of municipalities in Ahal Province
- List of municipalities in Balkan Province
- List of municipalities in Daşoguz Province
- List of municipalities in Lebap Province
- List of municipalities in Mary Province

== See also ==
- Demographics of Turkmenistan
- List of renamed cities in Turkmenistan
- OpenStreetMap Wiki / Districts in Turkmenistan (authoritative list of administrative subdivisions, including all districts, cities, towns, and villages)
