= Hojeýpil =

- Location in Turkmenistan
- Coordinates: 37°57′N 66°39′E
- Country: Turkmenistan
- Province: Lebap Province
- District: Köýtendag District
- Rural Council: Köýten geňeşligi
- Elevation: 1,346 m (4,416 ft)

Population
  - Total: 1,050

Hojeýpil (also spelled Hojeypil, Hojapil, Khodzhapil e Khodzhay-Fil'Ata — formerly Imeni Stalina) is a village in Köýtendag District, Lebap Province, in eastern Turkmenistan, near the border with Uzbekistan.

Nearby towns and villages include Köýten and Garlyk.

This settlement is situated about 15 km (9 mi) north-northeast (NNE) of Aýrybaba, the highest point in Turkmenistan.

== See also ==
- List of cities, towns and villages in Turkmenistan
- OpenStreetMap / Districts in Turkmenistan
