= Çagyl =

Çagyl Çagyl obasy
- Village
- Location in Turkmenistan
- Coordinates: 40°47′00″N 55°22′48″E
- Country: Turkmenistan
- Province: Balkan Province
- District: Türkmenbaşy District
- Rural Council: Çagyl geňeşligi

Population (2022 official census)
  - Total: 808
- Time zone: UTC+5

Çagyl is a village in Türkmenbaşy District, Balkan Province, Turkmenistan. It is the seat of a rural council of the same name. In 2022, it had a population of 808 people.

== Etymology ==
In Turkmen, the word "Çagyl" roughly translates as "Gravel" or "Pebble."

== Rural Council ==
The village is the seat of a rural council (geňeşlik) including three villages:

- Çagyl, village
- Awlamyş, village
- Tüwer, village

The villages of Awlamyş and Tüwer were previously included in Awlamyş Rural Council. The said rural council was abolished on 19 May 2016, and its villages were transferred to Çagyl's.

== See also ==
- List of municipalities in Balkan Province
