= Kerpiçli, Ak bugdaý =

Kerpiçli Kerpiçli obasy
- Village
- Location in Turkmenistan
- Coordinates: 38°54′13″N 59°10′07″E
- Country: Turkmenistan
- Province: Ahal Province
- District: Ak bugdaý District
- Town: Bokurdak

Population (2022 official census)
  - Total: 7
- Time zone: UTC+5

Kerpiçli, formerly known as Kirpili, is a village in Ak bugdaý District, Ahal Province, Turkmenistan. It is subordinate to the town of Bokurdak. In 2022, it had a population of 7 people.

== Etymology ==
In Turkmen, the word "Kerpiç" roughly translates as "Brick." The suffix -li is used to form adjectives or to signify the presence of something. "Kerpiçli" means there is a presence of bricks.

As the word "Kerpiç" is borrowed from "Кирпич" ("Kirpich") in Russian, the name of the village was misspelled as "Kirpili" until 2009. The name was then changed along with a long list of other toponyms.

== Subordination ==
The village is subordinate to Bokurdak, along with twenty-three other villages in the Karakum Desert:

Bokurdak, town:

- Bussy, village
- Çalyş, village
- Çürçüri, village
- Dawaly, village
- Düýeli, village
- Garaberdi, village
- Gargalaňdiňlisi, village
- Garryçyrla, village
- Garryja, village
- Gazykly, village
- Goşalar, village
- Gowşakgyzyltakyr, village
- Göbekli, village
- Gujurly, village
- Güneşli, village
- Gyzylsakal, village
- Hajyguly, village
- Kelleli, village
- Kerpiçli, village
- Mollagurban, village
- Oraz, village
- Oýukly, village
- Töwekgel, village
- Ýerbent, village

== See also ==
- List of municipalities in Ahal Province
