= Bagtyýarlyk, Tejen =

Bagtyýarlyk Bagtyýarlyk şäherçesi
- Town
- Location in Turkmenistan
- Coordinates: 37°24′47″N 60°26′00″E
- Country: Turkmenistan
- Province: Ahal Province
- District: Ak bugdaý District

Population (2022 official census)
  - Total: 9,804
- Time zone: UTC+5

Bagtyýarlyk, previously known as Moskwa (in Russian: Москва) then Berkarar, is a town located in Tejen District, Ahal Province, Turkmenistan. In 2022, it had a population of 9,804 people.

== Etymology ==
In Turkmen, the word "Bagt" means "Happiness." The suffixes -ýar and -lyk refer to a concept. The whole name "Bagtyýarlyk" then would refer more to "the state of happiness" than "happiness" itself.

== History ==
On April 28, 2016, the village of Berkarar was granted township status by parliamentary decree. In the same decree, the town was renamed Bagtyýarlyk as another town was already called Berkarar in Ahal Province.

== See also ==
- Towns of Turkmenistan
- List of municipalities in Ahal Province
