= Hywaabat =

Village in the Ahal Region

Hywaabat Hywaabat obasy
- Village
- Location in Turkmenistan
- Coordinates: 37°11′40″N 59°33′20″E
- Country: Turkmenistan
- Province: Ahal Province
- District: Kaka District
- City: Kaka

Population (2022 official census)
  - Total: 444
- Time zone: UTC+5

Hywaabat, sometimes mentioned as Khivabad (in Russian: "Хивабад") or New Khivabad, is a village in Kaka District, Ahal Province, Turkmenistan. The village is located in Laýynsuw river's valley, on the border with Iran. It is famed for the nearby fortress of the same name built by Nader Shah. In 2022, it had a population of 444 people.

== Etymology ==
The name "Hywaabat" is a compound of two words: "Hywa" and "Abat." Hywa is the Turkmen name for Khiva, a city in Uzbekistan, and former capital of the Khanate of Khiva. It is believed that Khiva might be a Turkic-altered form of the Persian name Khwarazm; however, the origin of it is unsure. "Abat" is a Turkmen-altered form of the Persian word "Abad", which refers to a settled place.

== Overview ==
Hywaabat is located in Laýynsuw River's valley, on the border with Iran. On the other side of the border lies the village of Sang Dīvār. It is 15 km away from Kaka, the district's capital city, to which the village is the only subordinate village. Roughly a kilometer north lies the old city of Hywaabat.

== History ==
Circa 1740, Nader Shah built a fortress in the area; local tradition argues Shah to have employed thousands of prisoners of war in bringing soil from Khiva for construction. Much of the fort and its components survive — the complex is now designated as Old Hywaabat. (Note: New Khivabad is used for the current village.) Entrances through the north and east walls lead into the main building, at the center.

Hywaabat was previously included in Arapgala Rural Council. It was then transferred to Kaka's subordination on 28 April 2016.
