= Çekiç =

Çekiç (Turkish pronunciation: [/t͡ʃeˈcit͡ʃ/]) is a Turkish surname, meaning "hammer" in Turkish. It was borrowed in some other languages, with different spellings. Notable people with the surname include:

- Amar Cekić (born 1992), German footballer
- Biljana Čekić (born 2007), Serbian actress
- Dušan Cekić (1879–1939), Yugoslavian communist politician
- Fatma Çekiç (born 2003), Turkish female karateka
- Mehmet Çekiç (born 1970), Turkish Paralympic alpine skier
- Özlem Cekic (born 1976), Turkish-Danish former politician
