= Uzboý =

Uzboý Uzboý şäherçesi
- Town
- Location in Turkmenistan
- Coordinates: 39°20′19″N 54°09′01″E
- Country: Turkmenistan
- Province: Balkan Province
- District: Balkanabat

Population (2022 official census)
  - Total: 730
- Time zone: UTC+5

Uzboý, previously known as "in the name of the 26 Baku Commissars" (in Russian: "имени 26 Бакинских Комиссаров"), or Vyshka ("Вышка") is a town in Balkan Province, Turkmenistan. The town is subordinate to Balkanabat city, which has district status. Promoted to a town in 1939, its name was then changed to Uzboý in 2003. In 2022, Uzboý had a population of 730 people.

== Etymology ==
The name Uzboý originated from a dried-up stream called Uzboý.

== History ==
The town emerged from an oil plant established at the foot of a hill called Neftedag, literally "Oil-hill" in Turkmen.

== Demographics ==
Historical population of Uzboý

| Year | Pop. | ±% p.a. |
|---|---|---|
| 1959 | 3,059 | — |
| 1970 | 2,485 | −1.87% |

| Year | Pop. | ±% p.a. |
|---|---|---|
| 1979 | 2,361 | −0.57% |
| 1989 | 1,302 | −5.78% |

| Year | Pop. | ±% p.a. |
|---|---|---|
| 2022 | 730 | −1.74% |
