= Tüwer =

Tüwer Tüwer obasy
- Village
- Location in Turkmenistan
- Coordinates: 40°50′25″N 55°10′01″E
- Country: Turkmenistan
- Province: Balkan Province
- District: Türkmenbaşy District
- Rural Council: Çagyl geňeşligi

Population (2022 official census)
  - Total: 222
- Time zone: UTC+5

Tüwer, formerly known as Tuar (in Russian: "Туар"), is a village in Türkmenbaşy District, Balkan Province, Turkmenistan. In 2022, it had a population of 222 people.

== Rural Council ==
The village is included, along with two other villages, in a rural council (geňeşlik) which seats in the village of Çagyl.

- Çagyl, village
- Awlamyş, village
- Tüwer, village

It was previously included in Awlamyş Rural Council. The said rural council was abolished on 19 May 2016, and its villages were transferred to Çagyl's.

== See also ==
- List of municipalities in Balkan Province
