= Awlamyş =

Awlamyş Awlamyş obasy
- Village
- Location in Turkmenistan
- Coordinates: 40°38′33″N 55°12′19″E
- Country: Turkmenistan
- Province: Balkan Province
- District: Türkmenbaşy District
- Rural Council: Çagyl geňeşligi

Population (2022 official census)
  - Total: 189
- Time zone: UTC+5

Awlamyş, formerly known as Oglamysh (in Russian: "Огламыш") is a village in Türkmenbaşy District, Balkan Province, Turkmenistan. In 2022, it had a population of 189 people.

== Etymology ==
In Turkmen, Awlamyş is the past form of Awlamak, which means "to hunt." Thus, the name roughly translates as "Hunted," most likely referring to something that was hunted around the village.

== Rural Council ==
The village is included, along with two other villages, in a rural council (geňeşlik) which seats in the village of Çagyl.

- Çagyl, village
- Awlamyş, village
- Tüwer, village

It was previously the seat of its own rural council. It has been transferred to Çagyl's on 19 May 2016.

== See also ==
- List of municipalities in Balkan Province
