= Pesti =

Pesti is a surname. Notable people with the surname include:

- Dalma Pesti (born 2007), Hungarian rhythmic gymnast
- Imre Pesti (born 1952), Hungarian physician and politician
