= Gaňňaly =

Gaňňaly Gaňňaly şäherçesi
- Town
- Location in Turkmenistan
- Coordinates: 37°02′00″N 60°47′45″E
- Country: Turkmenistan
- Province: Ahal Region
- District: Sarahs District

Population (2022 official census)
  - Total: 3,580
- Time zone: UTC+5

Gaňňaly, formerly known as Tejenstroý (in Russian: Тедженстрой), is a town located in Ahal Province, Turkmenistan. It lies next to the River Tejen, circa 45 km southeast of Tejen and circa 65 km northwest of Sarahs. In 2022, it had a population of 3,580.

== Etymology ==
The Turkmen word "Gaňňa" translates to "Packsaddle," which is a specific type of saddle meant to carry loads. "Gaňňaly" is an adjective that might translate to "[which is] wearing a packsaddle."

Before 2000, the settlement was named Тедженстрой (Tedzhenstroj). In Russian, it is a compound of the name "Tedzhen," which refers to the river Tejen, and the word "stroj," which refers to an idea of order, like a military formation, a rank, or a structure.

== Culture ==
=== People linked to Gaňňaly ===
- Kerim Gurbannepesow (1929-1988), a Turkmen poet that lived there for a few years during World War II.
