= List of municipalities in Daşoguz Province =

Map of the five provinces of Turkmenistan. Daşoguz is highlighted in red.

This article is referencing as a list all lawfully recognized municipalities of Daşoguz Province, Turkmenistan. Since 8 September 2025, there are 613 municipalities in Daşoguz, including one city with district status, 8 cities, 8 towns, and 594 villages.

In Turkmenistan, any administrative division, including municipalities, is designated by law and may be changed by decree by the Assembly of Turkmenistan, as stated by the 23rd article of the constitution. They all are referenced in a list rarely shared by the Turkmen government, yet available for consultation through the 2022 census.

Criticized by external observers, the census figures should be taken very carefully as they seem to overestimate the actual population of the country.

== Lists ==
Municipalities listed here are sorted by their administrative division, then by alphabetical order.

=== Cities ===
Cities with district status are bolded.

| Name | Population (2022) | District |
|---|---|---|
| Akdepe | 28,045 | Akdepe |
| Boldumsaz | 39,532 | Boldumsaz |
| **Daşoguz** | 201,142 | **Daşoguz** |
| Andalyp | 36,594 | Garaşsyzlyk |
| Görogly | 26,770 | Görogly |
| Gubadag | 18,950 | Gubadag |
| Köneürgenç | 37,176 | Köneürgenç |
| Şabat | 19,392 | Şabat |
| Saparmyrat Türkmenbaşy | 20,720 | Saparmyrat Türkmenbaşy |

=== Towns ===
| Name | Population (2022) | District |
|---|---|---|
| Orazgeldi Ärsaryýew | 8,040 | Akdepe |
| Rejepguly Ataýew | 2,760 | Garaşsyzlyk |
| Gökçäge | 7,569 | Gubadag |
| Bereket | 13,549 | Köneürgenç |
| Bitaraplyk | | Köneürgenç |
| **Ruhubelent** | 1,653 | Ruhubelent |
| Sadylla Rozmetow | 2,316 | Şabat |
| Aşyr Kakabaýew | 9,603 | Saparmyrat Türkmenbaşy |

=== Villages ===
Villages which hold the seat of their rural council are bolded.

| Name | Population (2022) | District | Included in |
|---|---|---|---|
| **Allaýaroý** | 2,504 | Akdepe | Agöýli geňeşligi |
| Galaýer | 2,418 | Akdepe | Agöýli geňeşligi |
| Küle | 872 | Akdepe | Agöýli geňeşligi |
| Üzümbag | 1,979 | Akdepe | Agöýli geňeşligi |
| **Magtymoý** | 2,807 | Akdepe | Ak bugdaý geňeşligi |
| Çoçun | 1,418 | Akdepe | Akdepe geňeşligi |
| Gyzanýap | 1,393 | Akdepe | Akdepe geňeşligi |
| Ýeke derek | 975 | Akdepe | Akdepe geňeşligi |
| **Zähmet** | 1,271 | Akdepe | Akdepe geňeşligi |
| Bereketli | 1,549 | Akdepe | Atçapan geňeşligi |
| **Gyzylýap** | 2,260 | Akdepe | Atçapan geňeşligi |
| Magtymguly | 1,150 | Akdepe | Atçapan geňeşligi |
| **Alilioý** | 3,499 | Akdepe | Döwletmämmet Azady adyndaky geňeşlik |
| Keýigoý | 2,246 | Akdepe | Döwletmämmet Azady adyndaky geňeşlik |
| **Derekli** | 5,269 | Akdepe | Gorkut geňeşligi |
| Alili | 3,140 | Akdepe | Magtymguly Garlyýew adyndaky geňeşlik |
| **Arap** | 1,785 | Akdepe | Magtymguly Garlyýew adyndaky geňeşlik |
| Jerenli | 2,543 | Akdepe | Magtymguly Garlyýew adyndaky geňeşlik |
| Polatly | 1,833 | Akdepe | Magtymguly Garlyýew adyndaky geňeşlik |
| Ussaly | 3,039 | Akdepe | Magtymguly Garlyýew adyndaky geňeşlik |
| Ýekeagaç | 1,762 | Akdepe | Magtymguly Garlyýew adyndaky geňeşlik |
| Akgaş | 543 | Akdepe | Mollanepes adyndaky geňeşlik |
| Atçapan | 1,512 | Akdepe | Mollanepes adyndaky geňeşlik |
| Garaja | 1,592 | Akdepe | Mollanepes adyndaky geňeşlik |
| Garataýly | 2,053 | Akdepe | Mollanepes adyndaky geňeşlik |
| Göwdük | 1,228 | Akdepe | Mollanepes adyndaky geňeşlik |
| Täzedurmuş | 1,953 | Akdepe | Mollanepes adyndaky geňeşlik |
| Täzemekan | 359 | Akdepe | Mollanepes adyndaky geňeşlik |
| Tekebeg | 646 | Akdepe | Mollanepes adyndaky geňeşlik |
| Toýnuk | 1,051 | Akdepe | Mollanepes adyndaky geňeşlik |
| **Watan** | 2,919 | Akdepe | Mollanepes adyndaky geňeşlik |
| Bereket | 5,501 | Akdepe | Nowruz geňeşligi |
| Darylyoý | 1,154 | Akdepe | Nowruz geňeşligi |
| Şasenem | 109 | Akdepe | Nowruz geňeşligi |
| **Sekizatlyk** | 5,270 | Akdepe | Nowruz geňeşligi |
| Ýekesöwüt | 2,347 | Akdepe | Nowruz geňeşligi |
| Baglyk | 2,809 | Akdepe | Orazgeldi Ärsaryýew |
| Garaboýnak | 2,805 | Akdepe | Orazgeldi Ärsaryýew |
| Gasymhowly | 2,588 | Akdepe | Orazgeldi Ärsaryýew |
| Jemşidi | 4,579 | Akdepe | Orazgeldi Ärsaryýew |
| Agzybirlik | 731 | Akdepe | Pagtaçylyk geňeşligi |
| Daýhan | 1,248 | Akdepe | Pagtaçylyk geňeşligi |
| Garrawy | 1,397 | Akdepe | Pagtaçylyk geňeşligi |
| Gazakly | 684 | Akdepe | Pagtaçylyk geňeşligi |
| **Medet** | 1,064 | Akdepe | Pagtaçylyk geňeşligi |
| Pagtaçylyk | 1,511 | Akdepe | Pagtaçylyk geňeşligi |
| Üçýap | 1,309 | Akdepe | Pagtaçylyk geňeşligi |
| **Saýat** | 507 | Akdepe | Sähra geňeşligi |
| Tokaýlyoba | 335 | Akdepe | Sähra geňeşligi |
| Üçagaç | 1,612 | Akdepe | Sähra geňeşligi |
| Ýeketut | 1,495 | Akdepe | Sähra geňeşligi |
| Bitaraplyk | 433 | Akdepe | Sazakly geňeşligi |
| **Ketgenli** | 4,072 | Akdepe | Sazakly geňeşligi |
| Pagtabaz | 208 | Akdepe | Sazakly geňeşligi |
| Sazaklyoý | 1,401 | Akdepe | Sazakly geňeşligi |
| Ýaldyrýap | 1,342 | Akdepe | Sazakly geňeşligi |
| Çatagaç | 357 | Akdepe | Täzeoba geňeşligi |
| Maşrykýap | 1,665 | Akdepe | Täzeoba geňeşligi |
| **Türkmenistan** | 597 | Akdepe | Täzeoba geňeşligi |
| **Agzybirlik** | 996 | Boldumsaz | 10 ýyl abadanlyk geňeşligi |
| Täze zaman | 765 | Boldumsaz | 10 ýyl abadanlyk geňeşligi |
| Ýagty ýol | 1,618 | Boldumsaz | 10 ýyl abadanlyk geňeşligi |
| Ýaşlyk | 1,166 | Boldumsaz | 10 ýyl abadanlyk geňeşligi |
| Watan | 634 | Boldumsaz | 10 ýyl abadanlyk geňeşligi |
| Almalyk | 1,815 | Boldumsaz | Almalyk geňeşligi |
| **Bereketli** | 1,258 | Boldumsaz | Almalyk geňeşligi |
| Bitaraplyk | 287 | Boldumsaz | Almalyk geňeşligi |
| Çarwalar | 590 | Boldumsaz | Almalyk geňeşligi |
| Gülzar | 423 | Boldumsaz | Almalyk geňeşligi |
| Sähra | 625 | Boldumsaz | Almalyk geňeşligi |
| Söýegbagşy | 1,014 | Boldumsaz | Almalyk geňeşligi |
| Türkmenistan | 1,162 | Boldumsaz | Almalyk geňeşligi |
| Ýalkym | 724 | Boldumsaz | Almalyk geňeşligi |
| Bereket | 446 | Boldumsaz | Aşgabat geňeşligi |
| **Çigoý** | 3,000 | Boldumsaz | Aşgabat geňeşligi |
| Tahýadaş | 1,157 | Boldumsaz | Aşgabat geňeşligi |
| Täzegüýç | 966 | Boldumsaz | Aşgabat geňeşligi |
| Ýaldyroý | 1,081 | Boldumsaz | Aşgabat geňeşligi |
| Ýüpek ýoly | 1,505 | Boldumsaz | Aşgabat geňeşligi |
| Altyn sähra | 1,310 | Boldumsaz | Garaşsyzlyk geňeşligi |
| **Asudalyk** | 1,002 | Boldumsaz | Garaşsyzlyk geňeşligi |
| Diýar | 1,343 | Boldumsaz | Garaşsyzlyk geňeşligi |
| Meleje | 1,538 | Boldumsaz | Garaşsyzlyk geňeşligi |
| Otuzoba | 353 | Boldumsaz | Garaşsyzlyk geňeşligi |
| Ruhubelent | 1,224 | Boldumsaz | Garaşsyzlyk geňeşligi |
| Birleşik | 2,693 | Boldumsaz | Guwanç Atamedow adyndaky geňeşlik |
| Bozajy | 732 | Boldumsaz | Guwanç Atamedow adyndaky geňeşlik |
| **Göbeklioý** | 4,663 | Boldumsaz | Guwanç Atamedow adyndaky geňeşlik |
| Söhbet | 2,849 | Boldumsaz | Guwanç Atamedow adyndaky geňeşlik |
| **Akmanýap** | 3,247 | Boldumsaz | Guýanagyz geňeşligi |
| Guýanagyz | 976 | Boldumsaz | Guýanagyz geňeşligi |
| **Altyn toprak** | 2,770 | Boldumsaz | Medeniýet geňeşligi |
| Altyn zaman | 1,605 | Boldumsaz | Medeniýet geňeşligi |
| Bagçylar | 667 | Boldumsaz | Medeniýet geňeşligi |
| Kuwwat | 1,157 | Boldumsaz | Medeniýet geňeşligi |
| Medeniýet | 549 | Boldumsaz | Medeniýet geňeşligi |
| Bagtyýarlyk | 1,165 | Boldumsaz | Rowaçlyk geňeşligi |
| **Galdaw** | 2,930 | Boldumsaz | Rowaçlyk geňeşligi |
| Kölsaka | 694 | Boldumsaz | Rowaçlyk geňeşligi |
| Särarýap | 1,544 | Boldumsaz | Rowaçlyk geňeşligi |
| **Altyn asyr** | 2,629 | Boldumsaz | Zähmetkeş geňeşligi |
| Aýlakly | 1,125 | Boldumsaz | Zähmetkeş geňeşligi |
| Bozýer | 1,048 | Boldumsaz | Zähmetkeş geňeşligi |
| Garaýylgyn | 1,808 | Boldumsaz | Zähmetkeş geňeşligi |
| Garaagaç | 1,764 | Garaşsyzlyk | Agzybirlik geňeşligi |
| Kürt | 1,677 | Garaşsyzlyk | Agzybirlik geňeşligi |
| Onbegi | 2,813 | Garaşsyzlyk | Agzybirlik geňeşligi |
| **Rejepguly Ataýew** | 2,209 | Garaşsyzlyk | Agzybirlik geňeşligi |
| Sabyrly | 1,855 | Garaşsyzlyk | Agzybirlik geňeşligi |
| Täte | 3,425 | Garaşsyzlyk | Agzybirlik geňeşligi |
| Agar | 6,716 | Garaşsyzlyk | Altyn toprak geňeşligi |
| Dörmen | 3,596 | Garaşsyzlyk | Altyn toprak geňeşligi |
| Garaşsyzlyk | 3,591 | Garaşsyzlyk | Altyn toprak geňeşligi |
| Göwender | 4,412 | Garaşsyzlyk | Altyn toprak geňeşligi |
| **Keneges** | 4,805 | Garaşsyzlyk | Altyn toprak geňeşligi |
| Ak altyn | 2,441 | Garaşsyzlyk | Ak altyn geňeşligi |
| Akja | 4,311 | Garaşsyzlyk | Ak altyn geňeşligi |
| Bagtyly | 3,461 | Garaşsyzlyk | Ak altyn geňeşligi |
| Gamyşlyk | 4,578 | Garaşsyzlyk | Ak altyn geňeşligi |
| Pekgeý | 2,164 | Garaşsyzlyk | Ak altyn geňeşligi |
| **Täzeýol** | 4,581 | Garaşsyzlyk | Ak altyn geňeşligi |
| Tekeli | 1,048 | Garaşsyzlyk | Ak altyn geňeşligi |
| **Basuwly** | 1,942 | Garaşsyzlyk | Gyzyltakyr geňeşligi |
| Burunjyk | 3,233 | Garaşsyzlyk | Gyzyltakyr geňeşligi |
| Gyzyltakyr | 1,434 | Garaşsyzlyk | Gyzyltakyr geňeşligi |
| **Andalyp** | 3,513 | Garaşsyzlyk | Nurmuhammet Andalyp adyndaky geňeşlik |
| Düýeçi | 2,578 | Garaşsyzlyk | Nurmuhammet Andalyp adyndaky geňeşlik |
| Garamazy | 8,578 | Garaşsyzlyk | Nurmuhammet Andalyp adyndaky geňeşlik |
| Könegala | 1,577 | Garaşsyzlyk | Nurmuhammet Andalyp adyndaky geňeşlik |
| Torgaý | 2,337 | Garaşsyzlyk | Nurmuhammet Andalyp adyndaky geňeşlik |
| Bagty | 1,980 | Garaşsyzlyk | Rejepguly Ataýew |
| Bamyly | 1,251 | Garaşsyzlyk | Rejepguly Ataýew |
| Çildir | 2,166 | Garaşsyzlyk | Rejepguly Ataýew |
| Gyzyl | 1,865 | Garaşsyzlyk | Rejepguly Ataýew |
| Keşler | 1,381 | Garaşsyzlyk | Rejepguly Ataýew |
| Meňiş | 3,594 | Garaşsyzlyk | Rejepguly Ataýew |
| Omarly | 1,874 | Garaşsyzlyk | Rejepguly Ataýew |
| Orman | 2,674 | Garaşsyzlyk | Rejepguly Ataýew |
| Çandyr | 9,110 | Garaşsyzlyk | Şabat geňeşligi |
| Derýalyk | 4,598 | Garaşsyzlyk | Şabat geňeşligi |
| Gülüstan | 3,166 | Garaşsyzlyk | Şabat geňeşligi |
| **Magtym** | 3,506 | Garaşsyzlyk | Şabat geňeşligi |
| Şarlawuk | 2,538 | Garaşsyzlyk | Şabat geňeşligi |
| Üçkepderi | 326 | Garaşsyzlyk | Şabat geňeşligi |
| Çarwalyk | 2,265 | Garaşsyzlyk | Sapyş Çerkezow adyndaky geňeşlik |
| Köpükli | 3,236 | Garaşsyzlyk | Sapyş Çerkezow adyndaky geňeşlik |
| **Magaryf** | 4,698 | Garaşsyzlyk | Sapyş Çerkezow adyndaky geňeşlik |
| Azatlyk | 992 | Garaşsyzlyk | Sazanda geňeşligi |
| Bagşyly | 1,217 | Garaşsyzlyk | Sazanda geňeşligi |
| Begleroba | 492 | Garaşsyzlyk | Sazanda geňeşligi |
| **Sazanda** | 1,139 | Garaşsyzlyk | Sazanda geňeşligi |
| **Bagly** | 3,624 | Garaşsyzlyk | Täzezaman geňeşligi |
| Dörtýap | 2,489 | Garaşsyzlyk | Täzezaman geňeşligi |
| Galkynyş | 1,607 | Garaşsyzlyk | Täzezaman geňeşligi |
| Heşdekler | 1,579 | Garaşsyzlyk | Täzezaman geňeşligi |
| Janam | 3,719 | Garaşsyzlyk | Täzezaman geňeşligi |
| Täzeçitir | 3,163 | Garaşsyzlyk | Täzezaman geňeşligi |
| Altyn asyr | 308 | Garaşsyzlyk | Üçkepderi geňeşligi |
| **Dostluk** | 1,296 | Garaşsyzlyk | Üçkepderi geňeşligi |
| Galalygyr | 164 | Garaşsyzlyk | Üçkepderi geňeşligi |
| Sözenli | 137 | Garaşsyzlyk | Üçkepderi geňeşligi |
| Akdüýeli | 1,836 | Görogly | Aksaraý geňeşligi |
| Akjeren | 823 | Görogly | Aksaraý geňeşligi |
| **Aksaraý** | 2,770 | Görogly | Aksaraý geňeşligi |
| Garamykly | 358 | Görogly | Aksaraý geňeşligi |
| Görelde | 3,609 | Görogly | Aksaraý geňeşligi |
| Ilaman | 2,548 | Görogly | Aksaraý geňeşligi |
| Tebele | 1,779 | Görogly | Aksaraý geňeşligi |
| **Annagylyç Ataýew** | 4,006 | Görogly | Annagylyç Ataýew adyndaky geňeşlik |
| Bäşatly | 1,620 | Görogly | Annagylyç Ataýew adyndaky geňeşlik |
| Gölli | 2,510 | Görogly | Annagylyç Ataýew adyndaky geňeşlik |
| Hangala | 653 | Görogly | Annagylyç Ataýew adyndaky geňeşlik |
| Şorýap | 1,164 | Görogly | Annagylyç Ataýew adyndaky geňeşlik |
| **Çoşşy Arazgylyjow** | 4,505 | Görogly | Balyş Öwezow adyndaky geňeşlik |
| Döwletli | 1,864 | Görogly | Balyş Öwezow adyndaky geňeşlik |
| Galaly | 488 | Görogly | Balyş Öwezow adyndaky geňeşlik |
| Täze | 1,236 | Görogly | Balyş Öwezow adyndaky geňeşlik |
| Wekilgala | 1,791 | Görogly | Balyş Öwezow adyndaky geňeşlik |
| Edermen | 2,814 | Görogly | Bedirkent geňeşligi |
| Kyrkgyz | 1,885 | Görogly | Bedirkent geňeşligi |
| **Ýaňyýap** | 6,639 | Görogly | Bedirkent geňeşligi |
| Çarbagly | 3,633 | Görogly | Bereket geňeşligi |
| Derekliýap | 620 | Görogly | Bereket geňeşligi |
| Goýunly | 2,570 | Görogly | Bereket geňeşligi |
| Şordepe | 565 | Görogly | Bereket geňeşligi |
| Uzynguýy | 2,948 | Görogly | Bereket geňeşligi |
| **Ýagtylyk** | 2,239 | Görogly | Bereket geňeşligi |
| Ýylgynly | 2,953 | Görogly | Bereket geňeşligi |
| Bäşjykyr | 1,161 | Görogly | Durdy Gylyç adyndaky geňeşlik |
| Birinji Diregli | 1,435 | Görogly | Durdy Gylyç adyndaky geňeşlik |
| Düýeboýun | 159 | Görogly | Durdy Gylyç adyndaky geňeşlik |
| Garagulak | 1,296 | Görogly | Durdy Gylyç adyndaky geňeşlik |
| **Ikinji Diregli** | 1,636 | Görogly | Durdy Gylyç adyndaky geňeşlik |
| Damla | 576 | Görogly | Garagum geňeşligi |
| **Garaýanyk** | 219 | Görogly | Garagum geňeşligi |
| Kyrkguýy | 67 | Görogly | Garagum geňeşligi |
| Altyngöl | 4,442 | Görogly | Hüdük Myradow adyndaky geňeşlik |
| Aýlakýap | 5,169 | Görogly | Hüdük Myradow adyndaky geňeşlik |
| **Bedirkent** | 1,704 | Görogly | Hüdük Myradow adyndaky geňeşlik |
| Buzgömen | 2,706 | Görogly | Hüdük Myradow adyndaky geňeşlik |
| Tamdyrly | 219 | Görogly | Hüdük Myradow adyndaky geňeşlik |
| Ýediýap | 484 | Görogly | Hüdük Myradow adyndaky geňeşlik |
| **Agöý** | 3,019 | Görogly | Magtymguly adyndaky geňeşlik |
| Akgöl | 3,019 | Görogly | Magtymguly adyndaky geňeşlik |
| Daşly | 1,100 | Görogly | Magtymguly adyndaky geňeşlik |
| Döwdan | 1,197 | Görogly | Magtymguly adyndaky geňeşlik |
| Hatartam | 3,070 | Görogly | Magtymguly adyndaky geňeşlik |
| Nazarguly | 2,262 | Görogly | Magtymguly adyndaky geňeşlik |
| Temeç | 2,999 | Görogly | Magtymguly adyndaky geňeşlik |
| Ýalkym | 1,882 | Görogly | Magtymguly adyndaky geňeşlik |
| Ýaşlyk | 1,624 | Görogly | Magtymguly adyndaky geňeşlik |
| Almaatyşan | 1,932 | Görogly | Türkmenistan geňeşligi |
| Daýhanýap | 1,480 | Görogly | Türkmenistan geňeşligi |
| **Kerpiçli** | 4,041 | Görogly | Türkmenistan geňeşligi |
| Çaňlyýap | 2,154 | Görogly | Türkmenistan geňeşligi |
| **Garaýyk** | 1,318 | Görogly | Türkmenistan geňeşligi |
| Gökje | 1,821 | Görogly | Türkmenistan geňeşligi |
| Keseýap | 1,516 | Görogly | Türkmenistan geňeşligi |
| Akguýy | 1,171 | Görogly | Ýagtylyk geňeşligi |
| Atalyk | 2,274 | Görogly | Ýagtylyk geňeşligi |
| **Boýunbaş** | 3,346 | Görogly | Ýagtylyk geňeşligi |
| Garakly | 536 | Görogly | Ýagtylyk geňeşligi |
| Gumlydepe | 3,100 | Görogly | Ýagtylyk geňeşligi |
| Yzmykşir | 1,291 | Görogly | Ýagtylyk geňeşligi |
| Galkynyş | 192 | Görogly | Yzmykşir geňeşligi |
| Gulamgala | 394 | Görogly | Yzmykşir geňeşligi |
| Hojaýap | 335 | Görogly | Yzmykşir geňeşligi |
| Maýabatan | 462 | Görogly | Yzmykşir geňeşligi |
| Täzeöýli | 535 | Görogly | Yzmykşir geňeşligi |
| **Ýenbekçi** | 416 | Görogly | Yzmykşir geňeşligi |
| **Akdepe** | 2,323 | Görogly | Zaman geňeşligi |
| Bagtyýarlyk | 1,600 | Görogly | Zaman geňeşligi |
| Öwlüýäboýy | 4,620 | Görogly | Zaman geňeşligi |
| Täzeýol | 2,051 | Görogly | Zaman geňeşligi |
| **Abadanlyk** | 4,696 | Gubadag | Abadanlyk geňeşligi |
| Agzybirlik | 2,008 | Gubadag | Abadanlyk geňeşligi |
| Bagalar | 1,922 | Gubadag | Abadanlyk geňeşligi |
| Bäsdeş | 1,846 | Gubadag | Abadanlyk geňeşligi |
| Gumly | 4,496 | Gubadag | Abadanlyk geňeşligi |
| Döwletli | 1,965 | Gubadag | Akýaýla geňeşligi |
| Görelde | 556 | Gubadag | Akýaýla geňeşligi |
| **Ýelharaz** | 4,688 | Gubadag | Akýaýla geňeşligi |
| Aýlak | 1,519 | Gubadag | Amyderýa geňeşligi |
| Burkutýap | 249 | Gubadag | Amyderýa geňeşligi |
| Çägeli | 2,852 | Gubadag | Amyderýa geňeşligi |
| Mäter | 1,483 | Gubadag | Amyderýa geňeşligi |
| **Öküzýap** | 4,657 | Gubadag | Amyderýa geňeşligi |
| Rowaçlyk | 1,483 | Gubadag | Amyderýa geňeşligi |
| Tutlyýap | 2,737 | Gubadag | Amyderýa geňeşligi |
| Ýylangyr | 1,632 | Gubadag | Amyderýa geňeşligi |
| Babadaýhan | 417 | Gubadag | Babadaýhan geňeşligi |
| Daýhanazat | 1,675 | Gubadag | Babadaýhan geňeşligi |
| **Wahym** | 2,230 | Gubadag | Babadaýhan geňeşligi |
| Badaýap | 1,696 | Gubadag | Baýdak geňeşligi |
| Çüýrükgala | 1,888 | Gubadag | Baýdak geňeşligi |
| Garadepe | 3,849 | Gubadag | Baýdak geňeşligi |
| Mergenoba | 2,749 | Gubadag | Baýdak geňeşligi |
| Üçköl | 1,813 | Gubadag | Baýdak geňeşligi |
| Badalar | 2,745 | Gubadag | Bereketli geňeşligi |
| Bozýap | 1,229 | Gubadag | Bereketli geňeşligi |
| Gumlyoba | 3,505 | Gubadag | Bereketli geňeşligi |
| Jemşidigala | 2,990 | Gubadag | Bereketli geňeşligi |
| Täzegala | 3,647 | Gubadag | Bereketli geňeşligi |
| Uşak | 3,851 | Gubadag | Bereketli geňeşligi |
| Derýalyk | 1,139 | Gubadag | Bitarap Türkmenistan geňeşligi |
| Garaköl | 3,651 | Gubadag | Bitarap Türkmenistan geňeşligi |
| Garaýap | 858 | Gubadag | Bitarap Türkmenistan geňeşligi |
| Gökýap | 966 | Gubadag | Bitarap Türkmenistan geňeşligi |
| **Igdirli** | 2,376 | Gubadag | Bitarap Türkmenistan geňeşligi |
| Kyrkgara | 1,576 | Gubadag | Bitarap Türkmenistan geňeşligi |
| Boldumsaz | 1,206 | Gubadag | Çowdur geňeşligi |
| Malaýýap | 2,867 | Gubadag | Çowdur geňeşligi |
| **Tommakýap** | 2,454 | Gubadag | Çowdur geňeşligi |
| Duzlyköl | 1,577 | Gubadag | Gökçäge |
| Maňňyt | 4,170 | Gubadag | Gökçäge |
| **Ak altyn** | 3,672 | Gubadag | Gökýaýla geňeşligi |
| Dostluk | 1,112 | Gubadag | Gökýaýla geňeşligi |
| Ýekederek | 1,413 | Gubadag | Gökýaýla geňeşligi |
| **Beglerýap** | 1,363 | Gubadag | Gubadag geňeşligi |
| Galajyk | 2,352 | Gubadag | Gubadag geňeşligi |
| Gökgala | 1,321 | Gubadag | Gubadag geňeşligi |
| Mollanepes | 1,171 | Gubadag | Gubadag geňeşligi |
| Weliýap | 2,536 | Gubadag | Gubadag geňeşligi |
| Gatyoý | 3,734 | Gubadag | Jeýhun geňeşligi |
| Gumýatak | 362 | Gubadag | Jeýhun geňeşligi |
| Gyrlyoba | 1,242 | Gubadag | Jeýhun geňeşligi |
| Jumabaýsaka | | Gubadag | Jeýhun geňeşligi |
| **Pagtaçy** | 2,024 | Gubadag | Jeýhun geňeşligi |
| Amyderýa | 1,951 | Gubadag | Ýaşlyk geňeşligi |
| Berkararlyk | 2,305 | Gubadag | Ýaşlyk geňeşligi |
| **Gulabiýa** | 2,649 | Gubadag | Ýaşlyk geňeşligi |
| Lawakly | 1,891 | Gubadag | Ýaşlyk geňeşligi |
| **Akderýa** | 1,964 | Köneürgenç | Akderýa geňeşligi |
| Bakyýap | 840 | Köneürgenç | Akderýa geňeşligi |
| Emingala | 884 | Köneürgenç | Akderýa geňeşligi |
| Halykberdi | 711 | Köneürgenç | Akderýa geňeşligi |
| Tamdyrlyboz | 1,105 | Köneürgenç | Akderýa geňeşligi |
| Täzebirleşik | 3,008 | Köneürgenç | Akderýa geňeşligi |
| **Akgala** | 5,574 | Köneürgenç | Akgala geňeşligi |
| Gumly | 523 | Köneürgenç | Akgala geňeşligi |
| Gyzylýer | 5,774 | Köneürgenç | Akgala geňeşligi |
| Horezm | 2,395 | Köneürgenç | Akgala geňeşligi |
| Hywaçyoý | 1,692 | Köneürgenç | Akgala geňeşligi |
| Jelaleddin | 2,399 | Köneürgenç | Akgala geňeşligi |
| Köçerýap | 1,426 | Köneürgenç | Akgala geňeşligi |
| Uýgurýer | 2,433 | Köneürgenç | Akgala geňeşligi |
| Eýmiroba | 582 | Köneürgenç | Akýol geňeşligi |
| Lebiýap | 959 | Köneürgenç | Akýol geňeşligi |
| Paltagaçan | 662 | Köneürgenç | Akýol geňeşligi |
| Täze | 1,236 | Köneürgenç | Akýol geňeşligi |
| **Zaman** | 1,236 | Köneürgenç | Akýol geňeşligi |
| Baýnuroý | 1,510 | Köneürgenç | Bereket |
| Dostluk | 1,832 | Köneürgenç | Bereket |
| Ýedigara | 7,844 | Köneürgenç | Bereket |
| Çilter | 1,625 | Köneürgenç | Bitaraplyk |
| Gamyşlyoý | 481 | Köneürgenç | Bitaraplyk |
| Garaşsyzlyk | 1,518 | Köneürgenç | Bitaraplyk |
| Gazakýer | 480 | Köneürgenç | Bitaraplyk |
| **Täzeýol** | 1,996 | Köneürgenç | Bitaraplyk |
| Kyrkgyzoý | 2,439 | Köneürgenç | Derýalyk geňeşligi |
| **Ezberköl** | 3,320 | Köneürgenç | Ezberköl geňeşligi |
| Körgala | 441 | Köneürgenç | Ezberköl geňeşligi |
| **Galkynyş** | 2,062 | Köneürgenç | Galkynyş geňeşligi |
| Goçgarköpri | 2,361 | Köneürgenç | Galkynyş geňeşligi |
| Guýanagyz | 255 | Köneürgenç | Galkynyş geňeşligi |
| Jigirdekli | 2,205 | Köneürgenç | Galkynyş geňeşligi |
| **Hakykat** | 2,090 | Köneürgenç | Hakykat geňeşligi |
| Hojaoý | 1,648 | Köneürgenç | Hakykat geňeşligi |
| Toklyoý | 785 | Köneürgenç | Hakykat geňeşligi |
| Türkmenistan | 546 | Köneürgenç | Hakykat geňeşligi |
| Galpakýaran | 817 | Köneürgenç | Kyrkgyz geňeşligi |
| Garaoý | 692 | Köneürgenç | Kyrkgyz geňeşligi |
| Gulaçýap | 1,427 | Köneürgenç | Kyrkgyz geňeşligi |
| **Kyrkgyz** | 2,779 | Köneürgenç | Kyrkgyz geňeşligi |
| Buýanly | 1,308 | Köneürgenç | Maslahat geňeşligi |
| Daýhanbirleşik | 2,846 | Köneürgenç | Maslahat geňeşligi |
| **Maslahat** | 5,815 | Köneürgenç | Maslahat geňeşligi |
| Maslahatdepe | 2,237 | Köneürgenç | Maslahat geňeşligi |
| Saraýgöl | 435 | Köneürgenç | Maslahat geňeşligi |
| Bagtyýarlyk | 1,211 | Köneürgenç | Pagtaçy geňeşligi |
| Birleşik | 67 | Köneürgenç | Pagtaçy geňeşligi |
| Garatereň | 790 | Köneürgenç | Pagtaçy geňeşligi |
| Gatyakar | 952 | Köneürgenç | Pagtaçy geňeşligi |
| Künjilioý | 1,257 | Köneürgenç | Pagtaçy geňeşligi |
| **Pagtaçy** | 3,029 | Köneürgenç | Pagtaçy geňeşligi |
| Akgum | 477 | Köneürgenç | Täzegüýç geňeşligi |
| Boýraçy | 817 | Köneürgenç | Täzegüýç geňeşligi |
| Garabelemýap | 1,387 | Köneürgenç | Täzegüýç geňeşligi |
| Gumlygala | 1,464 | Köneürgenç | Täzegüýç geňeşligi |
| **Täzegüýç** | 3,875 | Köneürgenç | Täzegüýç geňeşligi |
| Wekiloý | 999 | Köneürgenç | Täzegüýç geňeşligi |
| Akbaşly | 1,811 | Köneürgenç | Täzeýap geňeşligi |
| **Täzeýap** | 1,577 | Köneürgenç | Täzeýap geňeşligi |
| Uşakýap | 3,169 | Köneürgenç | Täzeýap geňeşligi |
| Aktakyr | 1,327 | Köneürgenç | Watan geňeşligi |
| Çetilioý | 471 | Köneürgenç | Watan geňeşligi |
| Döwletli | 1,439 | Köneürgenç | Watan geňeşligi |
| Ikinji Was | 85 | Köneürgenç | Watan geňeşligi |
| Teňňelioý | 451 | Köneürgenç | Watan geňeşligi |
| **Watan** | 1,546 | Köneürgenç | Watan geňeşligi |
| Akarýap | 373 | Ruhubelent | Aşyk Aýdyň geňeşligi |
| **Aşyk Aýdyň** | 393 | Ruhubelent | Aşyk Aýdyň geňeşligi |
| Bagşyly | | Ruhubelent | Aşyk Aýdyň geňeşligi |
| Kuwwat | 389 | Ruhubelent | Aşyk Aýdyň geňeşligi |
| Oguzboýy | 651 | Ruhubelent | Aşyk Aýdyň geňeşligi |
| Uzboý | 253 | Ruhubelent | Aşyk Aýdyň geňeşligi |
| Wasabat | 876 | Ruhubelent | Aşyk Aýdyň geňeşligi |
| **Diýarbekir** | 466 | Ruhubelent | Diýarbekir geňeşligi |
| Şähribossan | 557 | Ruhubelent | Diýarbekir geňeşligi |
| Agzybirlik | 665 | Ruhubelent | Geňeş geňeşligi |
| Çardepe | 546 | Ruhubelent | Geňeş geňeşligi |
| **Geňeş** | 907 | Ruhubelent | Geňeş geňeşligi |
| Oglanly | 519 | Ruhubelent | Geňeş geňeşligi |
| Parahat | 297 | Ruhubelent | Geňeş geňeşligi |
| Şagadam | 297 | Ruhubelent | Geňeş geňeşligi |
| Oguzhan | 868 | Ruhubelent | Ruhnama geňeşligi |
| **Ruhnama** | 503 | Ruhubelent | Ruhnama geňeşligi |
| Çalymergen | 658 | Ruhubelent | Şabende adyndaky geňeşlik |
| Magrupy | 394 | Ruhubelent | Şabende adyndaky geňeşlik |
| Maňgyr | 282 | Ruhubelent | Şabende adyndaky geňeşlik |
| Maňgyrabat | 425 | Ruhubelent | Şabende adyndaky geňeşlik |
| **Şabende** | 1,248 | Ruhubelent | Şabende adyndaky geňeşlik |
| Täzeýer | 267 | Ruhubelent | Şabende adyndaky geňeşlik |
| Altyn sähra | 377 | Ruhubelent | Şagadam geňeşligi |
| Bereketli | 507 | Ruhubelent | Şagadam geňeşligi |
| Çaýyrly | 566 | Ruhubelent | Şagadam geňeşligi |
| Duzgyr | 370 | Ruhubelent | Şagadam geňeşligi |
| Gyzyljaburun | 758 | Ruhubelent | Şagadam geňeşligi |
| Täzeoba | 35 | Ruhubelent | Şagadam geňeşligi |
| **Türkmenistan** | 573 | Ruhubelent | Şagadam geňeşligi |
| Yslam | 744 | Ruhubelent | Şagadam geňeşligi |
| Altyn zaman | 580 | Ruhubelent | Tünüderýa geňeşligi |
| Galkynyş | 608 | Ruhubelent | Tünüderýa geňeşligi |
| Garagum | 77 | Ruhubelent | Tünüderýa geňeşligi |
| Gäwersgyr | 60 | Ruhubelent | Tünüderýa geňeşligi |
| Şasenem | 188 | Ruhubelent | Tünüderýa geňeşligi |
| **Tünüderýa** | 1,202 | Ruhubelent | Tünüderýa geňeşligi |
| **Egriguýy** | 1,307 | Ruhubelent | Ýomut Durdyýew adyndaky geňeşlik |
| Çardere | 1,221 | Ruhubelent | Zähmet geňeşligi |
| **Toprakgala** | 1,785 | Ruhubelent | Zähmet geňeşligi |
| Was | 3,456 | Ruhubelent | Zähmet geňeşligi |
| Wasgala | 312 | Ruhubelent | Zähmet geňeşligi |
| **Garaporsaň** | 3,284 | Şabat | Adalat geňeşligi |
| Garawuldepe | 2,811 | Şabat | Adalat geňeşligi |
| Garaýabyly | 1,489 | Şabat | Adalat geňeşligi |
| Agzybirlik | 2,012 | Şabat | Altynýol geňeşligi |
| **Dilewar** | 2,820 | Şabat | Altynýol geňeşligi |
| Şorýer | 1,224 | Şabat | Altynýol geňeşligi |
| Birinji Gulan | 788 | Şabat | Alyşir Nowaýy adyndaky geňeşlik |
| Daýhanazat | 2,894 | Şabat | Alyşir Nowaýy adyndaky geňeşlik |
| Gamyşkak | 2,984 | Şabat | Alyşir Nowaýy adyndaky geňeşlik |
| Gumgala | 1,171 | Şabat | Alyşir Nowaýy adyndaky geňeşlik |
| **Hemzeşyh** | 4,497 | Şabat | Alyşir Nowaýy adyndaky geňeşlik |
| Ikinji Gulan | 1,635 | Şabat | Alyşir Nowaýy adyndaky geňeşlik |
| Bozgala | 3,458 | Şabat | Asudalyk geňeşligi |
| **Maýlyjeňňel** | 4,585 | Şabat | Asudalyk geňeşligi |
| Täzeusul | 1,909 | Şabat | Asudalyk geňeşligi |
| **Guljangala** | 1,841 | Şabat | Berkarar geňeşligi |
| Bagban | 1,298 | Şabat | Biruni adyndaky geňeşlik |
| **Mehinli** | 3,563 | Şabat | Biruni adyndaky geňeşlik |
| Alyşir Nowaýy | 2,869 | Şabat | Bossan geňeşligi |
| **Helleň** | 3,844 | Şabat | Bossan geňeşligi |
| Mädorazbatyr | 2,728 | Şabat | Bossan geňeşligi |
| Şabat | 714 | Şabat | Bossan geňeşligi |
| Sekizöýli | 2,501 | Şabat | Bossan geňeşligi |
| **Abdalýap** | 4,649 | Şabat | Diýar geňeşligi |
| Aýakketli | 5,715 | Şabat | Diýar geňeşligi |
| Galkynyş | 5,060 | Şabat | Diýar geňeşligi |
| Ogşuk | 3,473 | Şabat | Diýar geňeşligi |
| Jemşit | 2,816 | Şabat | Gaýrat geňeşligi |
| Täzedurmuş | 1,767 | Şabat | Gaýrat geňeşligi |
| Ulugek | 1,968 | Şabat | Gaýrat geňeşligi |
| **Ýaňyýol** | 2,913 | Şabat | Gaýrat geňeşligi |
| Öwezaly | 3,731 | Şabat | Gülüstan geňeşligi |
| **Parahat** | 9,850 | Şabat | Gülüstan geňeşligi |
| Şark | 4,238 | Şabat | Gülüstan geňeşligi |
| Ýoldaş Ahmedow | 2,522 | Şabat | Gülüstan geňeşligi |
| Altmyş | 3,312 | Şabat | Hasylçy geňeşligi |
| Boz | 132 | Şabat | Hasylçy geňeşligi |
| Diwanbegi | 1,042 | Şabat | Hasylçy geňeşligi |
| Gargaly | 3,071 | Şabat | Hasylçy geňeşligi |
| **Hasylçy** | 3,762 | Şabat | Hasylçy geňeşligi |
| Serhetabat | 403 | Şabat | Hasylçy geňeşligi |
| Ynkylap | 2,135 | Şabat | Hasylçy geňeşligi |
| Bäşmergen | 1,803 | Şabat | Nowbahar geňeşligi |
| Garamanly | 3,881 | Şabat | Nowbahar geňeşligi |
| Gülzar | 2,837 | Şabat | Nowbahar geňeşligi |
| **Rozumboý** | 7,410 | Şabat | Nowbahar geňeşligi |
| Şyhgala | 6,025 | Şabat | Nowbahar geňeşligi |
| Täze ýol | 6,249 | Şabat | Nowbahar geňeşligi |
| Ak altyn | 344 | Şabat | Sadylla Rozmetow |
| Altynköl | 1,085 | Şabat | Sadylla Rozmetow |
| Bereket | 319 | Şabat | Sadylla Rozmetow |
| Bossan | 324 | Şabat | Sadylla Rozmetow |
| Çarbag | 1,680 | Şabat | Sadylla Rozmetow |
| Derýalyk | 94 | Şabat | Sadylla Rozmetow |
| Döwletli | 955 | Şabat | Sadylla Rozmetow |
| Gaýrat | 1,684 | Şabat | Sadylla Rozmetow |
| Isgender Hojaýew | 2,288 | Şabat | Sadylla Rozmetow |
| Kyýat | 1,045 | Şabat | Sadylla Rozmetow |
| Nowbahar | 524 | Şabat | Sadylla Rozmetow |
| Nowruz | 2,345 | Şabat | Sadylla Rozmetow |
| Oýrat | 2,030 | Şabat | Sadylla Rozmetow |
| Pagtaçy | 1,546 | Şabat | Sadylla Rozmetow |
| Watan | 847 | Şabat | Sadylla Rozmetow |
| Ýaňyýer | 1,115 | Şabat | Sadylla Rozmetow |
| Ýarmyş | 2,356 | Şabat | Sadylla Rozmetow |
| Ýaşlyk | 309 | Şabat | Sadylla Rozmetow |
| Ýyldyz | 1,757 | Şabat | Sadylla Rozmetow |
| Zawod | 198 | Şabat | Sadylla Rozmetow |
| Çagataý | 1,168 | Şabat | Şatlyk geňeşligi |
| Eýwança | 3,418 | Şabat | Şatlyk geňeşligi |
| Şabatly | 4,789 | Şabat | Şatlyk geňeşligi |
| Şöhrat | 4,654 | Şabat | Şatlyk geňeşligi |
| **Täzebazar** | 3,091 | Şabat | Şatlyk geňeşligi |
| Uzynköl | 751 | Şabat | Şatlyk geňeşligi |
| Bagtyýarlyk | 1,451 | Şabat | Şöhrat geňeşligi |
| **Buýanly** | 4,450 | Şabat | Şöhrat geňeşligi |
| Medeniýet | 2,067 | Şabat | Şöhrat geňeşligi |
| Garaoý | 2,832 | Saparmyrat Türkmenbaşy | Aşyr Kakabaýew |
| Garawulgala | 1,879 | Saparmyrat Türkmenbaşy | Aşyr Kakabaýew |
| Gojukgala | 3,413 | Saparmyrat Türkmenbaşy | Aşyr Kakabaýew |
| Harmanjyk | 1,442 | Saparmyrat Türkmenbaşy | Aşyr Kakabaýew |
| Şarawýap | 479 | Saparmyrat Türkmenbaşy | Aşyr Kakabaýew |
| Şirwan | 322 | Saparmyrat Türkmenbaşy | Aşyr Kakabaýew |
| **Aýböwür** | 1,176 | Saparmyrat Türkmenbaşy | Aýböwür geňeşligi |
| Diňliburun | 158 | Saparmyrat Türkmenbaşy | Aýböwür geňeşligi |
| Kesekli | 224 | Saparmyrat Türkmenbaşy | Aýböwür geňeşligi |
| Merjen | 138 | Saparmyrat Türkmenbaşy | Aýböwür geňeşligi |
| Sarygaldaw | 959 | Saparmyrat Türkmenbaşy | Aýböwür geňeşligi |
| Aktam | 776 | Saparmyrat Türkmenbaşy | Azatlyk geňeşligi |
| **Alýan** | 2,299 | Saparmyrat Türkmenbaşy | Azatlyk geňeşligi |
| Bäşýap | 361 | Saparmyrat Türkmenbaşy | Azatlyk geňeşligi |
| Giňýandak | 1,021 | Saparmyrat Türkmenbaşy | Azatlyk geňeşligi |
| Gyzylkümmet | 847 | Saparmyrat Türkmenbaşy | Azatlyk geňeşligi |
| Işanköl | 561 | Saparmyrat Türkmenbaşy | Azatlyk geňeşligi |
| Medeniýet | 469 | Saparmyrat Türkmenbaşy | Baýram Taganow adyndaky geňeşlik |
| **Toklulyoý** | 1,178 | Saparmyrat Türkmenbaşy | Baýram Taganow adyndaky geňeşlik |
| Birleşik | 414 | Saparmyrat Türkmenbaşy | Bitaraplyk geňeşligi |
| **Bitaraplyk** | 481 | Saparmyrat Türkmenbaşy | Bitaraplyk geňeşligi |
| Monjukly | 114 | Saparmyrat Türkmenbaşy | Bitaraplyk geňeşligi |
| Nowruz | 608 | Saparmyrat Türkmenbaşy | Bitaraplyk geňeşligi |
| Täzezaman | 340 | Saparmyrat Türkmenbaşy | Bitaraplyk geňeşligi |
| Zähmetkeş | 657 | Saparmyrat Türkmenbaşy | Bitaraplyk geňeşligi |
| Bereketli | 2,404 | Saparmyrat Türkmenbaşy | Bugdaýly geňeşligi |
| Narböwet | 383 | Saparmyrat Türkmenbaşy | Bugdaýly geňeşligi |
| **Täzeýer** | 1,264 | Saparmyrat Türkmenbaşy | Bugdaýly geňeşligi |
| Berdinyýazhowly | 486 | Saparmyrat Türkmenbaşy | Dostluk geňeşligi |
| Gylyçbaýhowly | 1,517 | Saparmyrat Türkmenbaşy | Dostluk geňeşligi |
| Jembap | 2,068 | Saparmyrat Türkmenbaşy | Dostluk geňeşligi |
| Kemine | 684 | Saparmyrat Türkmenbaşy | Dostluk geňeşligi |
| **Nazarbaýdegiş** | 2,563 | Saparmyrat Türkmenbaşy | Dostluk geňeşligi |
| Akböwet | 115 | Saparmyrat Türkmenbaşy | Döwkesen geňeşligi |
| Ak öý | 145 | Saparmyrat Türkmenbaşy | Döwkesen geňeşligi |
| Baleýşem | 542 | Saparmyrat Türkmenbaşy | Döwkesen geňeşligi |
| Bötendag | 697 | Saparmyrat Türkmenbaşy | Döwkesen geňeşligi |
| **Döwkesen** | 503 | Saparmyrat Türkmenbaşy | Döwkesen geňeşligi |
| Bozýap | 529 | Saparmyrat Türkmenbaşy | Döwletli geňeşligi |
| **Döwletli** | 2,095 | Saparmyrat Türkmenbaşy | Döwletli geňeşligi |
| Düýetam | 1,339 | Saparmyrat Türkmenbaşy | Döwletli geňeşligi |
| **Gallaçy** | 3,112 | Saparmyrat Türkmenbaşy | Gallaçy geňeşligi |
| Ruhubelent | 286 | Saparmyrat Türkmenbaşy | Gallaçy geňeşligi |
| Bakyýap | 1,687 | Saparmyrat Türkmenbaşy | Görelde geňeşligi |
| Gumgaçy | 1,136 | Saparmyrat Türkmenbaşy | Görelde geňeşligi |
| **Sowranly** | 1,878 | Saparmyrat Türkmenbaşy | Görelde geňeşligi |
| Agzybirlik | 1,540 | Saparmyrat Türkmenbaşy | Goşahowly geňeşligi |
| **Arzuw** | 3,065 | Saparmyrat Türkmenbaşy | Goşahowly geňeşligi |
| Babadaýhan | 312 | Saparmyrat Türkmenbaşy | Goşahowly geňeşligi |
| Bäştam | 699 | Saparmyrat Türkmenbaşy | Goşahowly geňeşligi |
| Bereket | 307 | Saparmyrat Türkmenbaşy | Goşahowly geňeşligi |
| Galkynyş | 393 | Saparmyrat Türkmenbaşy | Goşahowly geňeşligi |
| Goşahowly | 690 | Saparmyrat Türkmenbaşy | Goşahowly geňeşligi |
| Kemerýylgyn | 725 | Saparmyrat Türkmenbaşy | Goşahowly geňeşligi |
| Kyrkguýy | 1,006 | Saparmyrat Türkmenbaşy | Goşahowly geňeşligi |
| Peşanalydepe | 2,574 | Saparmyrat Türkmenbaşy | Goşahowly geňeşligi |
| **Gazakdegiş** | 4,035 | Saparmyrat Türkmenbaşy | Güneşli Türkmenistan geňeşligi |
| Gazly | 1,273 | Saparmyrat Türkmenbaşy | Güneşli Türkmenistan geňeşligi |
| Gumýol | 256 | Saparmyrat Türkmenbaşy | Güneşli Türkmenistan geňeşligi |
| Şäherlik | 886 | Saparmyrat Türkmenbaşy | Güneşli Türkmenistan geňeşligi |
| Üstýurt | 263 | Saparmyrat Türkmenbaşy | Güneşli Türkmenistan geňeşligi |
| Eminhowly | 1,033 | Saparmyrat Türkmenbaşy | Gyzyljagala geňeşligi |
| Garadepe | 1,733 | Saparmyrat Türkmenbaşy | Gyzyljagala geňeşligi |
| Garasaç | 807 | Saparmyrat Türkmenbaşy | Gyzyljagala geňeşligi |
| Gyzyljagala | 1,308 | Saparmyrat Türkmenbaşy | Gyzyljagala geňeşligi |
| Hojaly | 1,162 | Saparmyrat Türkmenbaşy | Gyzyljagala geňeşligi |
| **Kirşenoý** | 2,737 | Saparmyrat Türkmenbaşy | Gyzyljagala geňeşligi |
| Sazakýap | 939 | Saparmyrat Türkmenbaşy | Gyzyljagala geňeşligi |
| Kernaýoba | 1,120 | Saparmyrat Türkmenbaşy | Kemine geňeşligi |
| **Seýitýaýla** | 2,129 | Saparmyrat Türkmenbaşy | Kemine geňeşligi |
| Ýylgynly | 576 | Saparmyrat Türkmenbaşy | Kemine geňeşligi |
| Garryýasga | 1,422 | Saparmyrat Türkmenbaşy | Mollaoraz Hojamämmedow adyndaky geňeşlik |
| Gatylyk | 670 | Saparmyrat Türkmenbaşy | Mollaoraz Hojamämmedow adyndaky geňeşlik |
| **Guýulyk** | 2,039 | Saparmyrat Türkmenbaşy | Mollaoraz Hojamämmedow adyndaky geňeşlik |
| Çynakar | 539 | Saparmyrat Türkmenbaşy | Nazly Gylyjow adyndaky geňeşlik |
| Gölýap | 970 | Saparmyrat Türkmenbaşy | Nazly Gylyjow adyndaky geňeşlik |
| **Gyzylçaryk** | 4,501 | Saparmyrat Türkmenbaşy | Nazly Gylyjow adyndaky geňeşlik |
| Togalakdepe | 919 | Saparmyrat Türkmenbaşy | Nazly Gylyjow adyndaky geňeşlik |
| Ýekeagaçly | 441 | Saparmyrat Türkmenbaşy | Nazly Gylyjow adyndaky geňeşlik |
| Dawalyköl | 840 | Saparmyrat Türkmenbaşy | Parahat geňeşligi |
| **Gölýer** | 3,344 | Saparmyrat Türkmenbaşy | Parahat geňeşligi |
| Seňňer | 1,034 | Saparmyrat Türkmenbaşy | Parahat geňeşligi |
| Akdegiş | 753 | Saparmyrat Türkmenbaşy | Ruhabat geňeşligi |
| **Bozoba** | 854 | Saparmyrat Türkmenbaşy | Ruhabat geňeşligi |
| Ruhabat | 753 | Saparmyrat Türkmenbaşy | Ruhabat geňeşligi |
| Çopandepe | 334 | Saparmyrat Türkmenbaşy | Şamahy geňeşligi |
| Gyradegen | 846 | Saparmyrat Türkmenbaşy | Şamahy geňeşligi |
| Sabynýol | 412 | Saparmyrat Türkmenbaşy | Şamahy geňeşligi |
| **Şamahy** | 2,815 | Saparmyrat Türkmenbaşy | Şamahy geňeşligi |
| Syzalyoý | 988 | Saparmyrat Türkmenbaşy | Şamahy geňeşligi |
| Kiçigum | 1,005 | Saparmyrat Türkmenbaşy | Saparmät Hojaýew adyndaky geňeşlik |
| **Ýartygala** | 89 | Saparmyrat Türkmenbaşy | Saparmät Hojaýew adyndaky geňeşlik |
| Atgyrlan | 597 | Saparmyrat Türkmenbaşy | Sarygamyş geňeşligi |
| Gyzyltam | 1,738 | Saparmyrat Türkmenbaşy | Sarygamyş geňeşligi |
| **Sarygamyş** | 4,682 | Saparmyrat Türkmenbaşy | Sarygamyş geňeşligi |
| Selmeliköl | 1,178 | Saparmyrat Türkmenbaşy | Sarygamyş geňeşligi |
| Aýryçagyl | 668 | Saparmyrat Türkmenbaşy | Serdar geňeşligi |
| Kaşgaýol | 995 | Saparmyrat Türkmenbaşy | Serdar geňeşligi |
| **Serdar** | 1,662 | Saparmyrat Türkmenbaşy | Serdar geňeşligi |
| Daşsaka | 639 | Saparmyrat Türkmenbaşy | Täzedurmuş geňeşligi |
| **Üçtam** | 3,051 | Saparmyrat Türkmenbaşy | Täzedurmuş geňeşligi |
| Akýap | 1,045 | Saparmyrat Türkmenbaşy | Ýalkym geňeşligi |
| Annaoý | 1,684 | Saparmyrat Türkmenbaşy | Ýalkym geňeşligi |
| Badasuw | 524 | Saparmyrat Türkmenbaşy | Ýalkym geňeşligi |
| Gözelçäge | 465 | Saparmyrat Türkmenbaşy | Ýalkym geňeşligi |
| Guşbegi | 908 | Saparmyrat Türkmenbaşy | Ýalkym geňeşligi |
| **Toraňňyly** | 2,109 | Saparmyrat Türkmenbaşy | Ýalkym geňeşligi |
| Uzynsuw | 1,274 | Saparmyrat Türkmenbaşy | Ýalkym geňeşligi |
| Gyjakly | 1,179 | Saparmyrat Türkmenbaşy | Ýeňiş geňeşligi |
| **Nefereoý** | 1,104 | Saparmyrat Türkmenbaşy | Ýeňiş geňeşligi |
| Ýeňiş | 1,359 | Saparmyrat Türkmenbaşy | Ýeňiş geňeşligi |

== See also ==
- Cities of Turkmenistan
- Towns of Turkmenistan
- List of cities, towns and villages in Turkmenistan
- Demographics of Turkmenistan
