= Bagtyýarlyk =

Bagtyýarlyk (Turkmen: "happiness") may refer to:

== Places ==
=== Districts ===
- Bagtyýarlyk District, a borough of Ashgabat, Turkmenistan

=== Towns ===
- Bagtyýarlyk, Baýramaly, a town in Mary Province, Turkmenistan
- Bagtyýarlyk, Tejen, a town in Ahal Province, Turkmenistan

=== Villages ===
- Bagtyýarlyk, Boldumsaz, a village in Boldumsaz District, Daşoguz Province, Turkmenistan
- Bagtyýarlyk, Çärjew, a village in Çärjew District, Lebap Province, Turkmenistan
- Bagtyýarlyk, Görogly, a village in Görogly District, Daşoguz Province, Turkmenistan
- Bagtyýarlyk, Köneürgenç, a village in Köneürgenç District, Daşoguz Province, Turkmenistan
- Bagtyýarlyk, Şabat, a village in Şabat District, Daşoguz Province, Turkmenistan
- Bagtyýarlyk, Saýat, a village in Saýat District, Lebap Province, Turkmenistan
- Bagtyýarlyk, Ýolöten, a village in Ýolöten District, Mary Province, Turkmenistan

=== Other ===
- Bagtyýarlyk PSA Territory, a set of natural gas fields in Turkmenistan
