= Saparmyrat Türkmenbaşy District =

Saparmyrat Türkmenbaşy District Saparmyrat Türkmenbaşy etraby
- District
- Country: Turkmenistan
- Province: Daşoguz Province
- Capital: Saparmyrat Türkmenbaşy

Area
  - District: 7,620 sq mi (19,740 km^{2})

Population (2022 official census)
  - District: 152,494
  - Density: 20.01/sq mi (7.725/km^{2})
  - Urban: 30,323
  - Rural: 122,171
- Time zone: UTC+5 (+5)

Saparmyrat Türkmenbaşy District is a district of Daşoguz Province in Turkmenistan. The administrative center of the district is the city of Saparmyrat Türkmenbaşy.

Founded as Oktyabrskiy District of Tashauz Region in February 1975, this district was included in Daşoguz and renamed as Saparmyrat Türkmenbaşy by Saparmyrat Nyýazow himself, which was officially known as "Türkmenbaşy," in 1992.

== History ==
On 13 June 2016, the district was granted 1,385,668 hectares from Akdepe, Boldumsaz, Gubadag, and Köneürgenç Districts, tripling its size.

== Administrative Subdivisions ==
S. Türkmenbaşy District includes 27 third-level subdivisions, one city, one town and 25 rural councils, including 111 villages:

=== Cities ===
- Saparmyrat Türkmenbaşy

=== Towns ===
- Aşyr Kakabaýew, including six villages

=== Rural Councils ===
- Aýböwür, including five villages
- Alýan, including six villages
- Baýram Taganow, including two villages
- Bitaraplyk, including six villages
- Bugdaýly, including three villages
- Dostluk, including five villages
- Döwkesen, including five villages
- Döwletli, including three villages
- Gallaçy, including two villages
- Görelde, including three villages
- Goşahowly, including ten villages
- Güneşli Türkmenistan, including five villages
- Gyzyljagala, including seven villages
- Kemine, including three villages
- Mollaoraz Hojamämmedow, including three villages
- Nazly Gylyjow, including five villages
- Parahat, including three villages
- Ruhabat, including three villages
- Şamahy, including five villages
- Saparmät Hojaýew, including two villages
- Sarygamyş, including four villages
- Serdar, including three villages
- Täzedurmuş, including two villages
- Ýalkym, including seven villages
- Ýeňiş, including three villages

== See also ==
- Districts of Turkmenistan
