= Aksaray (Turkmenistan) =

Village in Dashoguz

Aksaray is a village in the Dashoguz region of Turkmenistan.

== Geography ==
Aksaray is located about 20 km south of Görogly.

== Site ==
The place is noted for Aksaray Ding — an "unusual" fired brick structure.
