= Görogly =

Görogly may refer to:

- Epic of Koroghlu (Görogly in the Turkmen language)
- Görogly (city), a city in Dashoguz province, Turkmenistan
- Görogly District, an administrative subdivision of Dashoguz province, Turkmenistan
