= Lake Aýböwür =

Lake in Turkmenistan

- Aýböwür köli
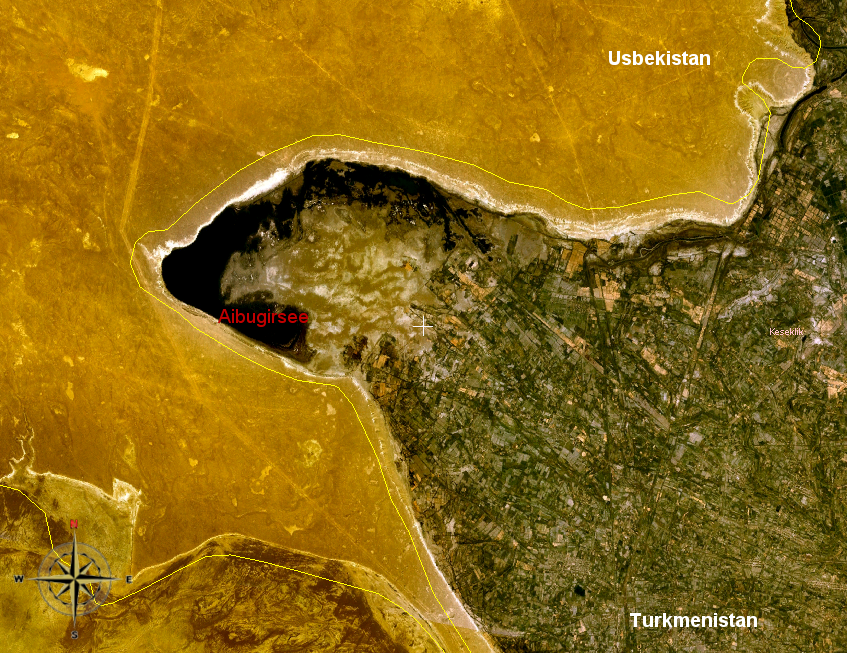

- Location within Turkmenistan
- Interactive map of Lake Aýböwür
- Location: Turkmenistan
- Coordinates: 42°38′N 58°22′E
- Type: lake

Lake Aýböwür, also known as Lake Aibugir, or Lake Kerneý, is a lake located in S. Türkmenbaşy District, Daşoguz Province, Turkmenistan, as part of the Amu Darya Plain.

The lake was previously not an independent body of water as it was connected to the Aral Sea and referred to as a bay. However, due to desertification in the 20th century, the two bodies of water no longer connect. The lake now consists of the western-most portion of the bay. The Turkmenistan-Uzbekistan border is established around up the lake, following Ustyurt Plateau's rim.
