= 1978 Iranian Chinook shootdown =

Helicopters shot down by Soviet air defense forces

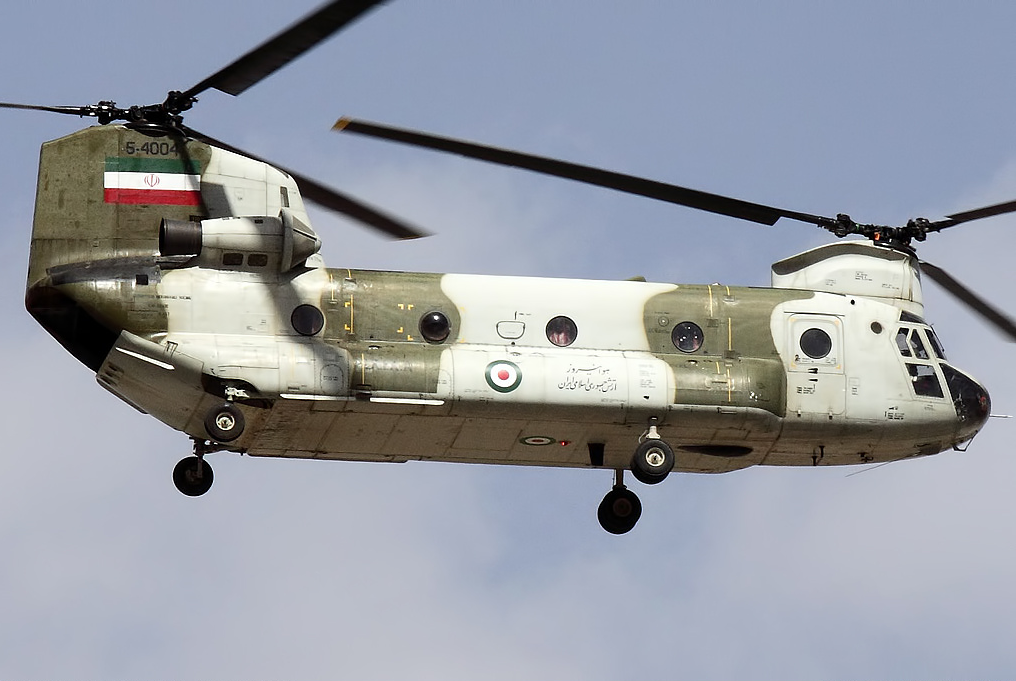
- An Iranian Army Chinook similar to the helicopters shot down

Incident
- Date: 21 June 1978
- Summary: Two helicopters shot down
- Site: Inside the Turkmen Soviet Socialist Republic, Soviet Union, after straying from the Iranian border

Aircraft
- Aircraft type: Boeing CH-47 Chinook
- Operator: Imperial Iranian Air Force
- Occupants: 12
- Crew: 12
- Fatalities: 8
- Injuries: 4
- Survivors: 4

The 1978 Iranian Chinook shootdown was an incident on 21 June 1978, when four Boeing CH-47 Chinooks of the Imperial Iranian Air Force strayed into Soviet airspace during a training mission, with the result being that two of them were shot down by the PVO.

== Shootdown ==
During the 1970s, numerous incidents, probably including Project Dark Gene occurred on the Soviet-Iranian and Afghan-Iranian border, causing the Soviets to station a regiment of MiG-23s at Ak-Tepe Air Base, near the border with Afghanistan, in what was then the Turkestan Military District. One of the most serious of these occurred in the early morning of 21 June 1978, at 06:21 AM, when a Soviet radar site near the village of Bagir, not far from Ashkabad, detected four slow-moving contacts which came from Pahlavi Iran and penetrated 15 to 20 kilometers into the Soviet airspace near Dushak, in Turkmenistan.

Five minutes later, these targets were detected by the radar site of Ak-Tepe Air Base, and the deputy commander of the 152nd IAP, Lt.Col. J. A. Miloslavsky, ordered one MiG-23M, flown by Capt. A. V. Dem'janov, to scramble. Once over the area, Dem'janov found only one helicopter, but misidentified it as a friendly Mil Mi-6. In addition, he got a command from the command post, "not to turn weapons on and not to come too close to the target". Because Dem'janov's answers to calls from the GCI station sounded uncertain, he was finally ordered back to Ak-Tepe AB and instead, at 06:52 AM, Lt.Col. Miloslavsky dispatched another MiG-23M, flown by Capt. Valery I. Shkinder.

Shkinder approached four contacts, identified them properly as Boeing CH-47 Chinook helicopters of the Imperial Iranian Air Force and got an order to attack. At the time, the Iranian Chinooks were flying in two pairs to the northwest along the Qaraqum Canal, but when their crews detected the interceptor over them, they made a turn to the southwest and flew towards the Kopet mountains and the Iranian border.

Diving behind the two rear Chinooks, Capt. Shkinder fired two Molniya R-60 IR-homing air-to-air missiles. Both missiles found their mark and struck the rearmost helicopter, the wreckage of which crashed near the village of Gjaurs, killing all eight crew members. Capt. Shkinder informed his base of the destruction of the first target and got an order to attack the second helicopter. Turning around, he positioned his MiG-23M behind the damaged helicopter and opened fire with his GSh-23L 23 mm gun, spending a total of 72 rounds in two passes and hitting the starboard engine of the CH-47C. The Iranian pilot made an emergency landing near the Soviet border post at Gjaurs. All four crew members survived, but were subsequently captured by Soviet border guards. The remaining two Chinooks escaped, crossing back into Iranian airspace.

== Aftermath ==
Despite a severe loss of life for the IIAF, the incident was downplayed by both sides, and the Soviets subsequently permitted the damaged Chinook to be repaired by Iranians and flown back to Iran, together with all four crew members: Capt. Valery Shkinder was also not decorated for his feat; a proposal was made for him to get a Combat Red Flag Award, with the Kremlin rejecting the proposal "due to a very complex international situation". Ten years later in 1988 in a similar incident, two Soviet MiG-23s shot down a pair of Iranian AH-1Js that had strayed into western Afghan airspace. The Soviets were occupying Afghanistan at the time and were withdrawing. 15 years before this incident at least another shootdown had occurred in which an Imperial Iranian Army Aviation (IIAA) Aero Commander 560 had been shot down by a Soviet MiG-17P.
