= Shahsenem =

Shahsenem (Russian:Шах-Сенем; Turkmen:Şasenem) was a medieval settlement located in the Daşoguz region of modern-day Turkmenistan.
