= Ak altyn (Daşoguz) =

Ak altyn Ak altyn
- Location in Turkmenistan
- Coordinates: 42°11′N 58°22′E
- Country: Turkmenistan
- Province: Daşoguz Province

Ak altyn is a village in northern Turkmenistan near the border with Uzbekistan. It is located in Daşoguz Province. The Turkmen term ak altyn means "white gold" and refers to cotton, which is grown in the area.
