= Saparmyrat Türkmenbaşy =

Saparmyrat Türkmenbaşy Saparmyrat Türkmenbaşy adyndaky şäher
- City
- Location in Turkmenistan
- Coordinates: 42.382003°N 58.807014°E
- Country: Turkmenistan
- Province: Daşoguz Province
- District: Saparmyrat Türkmenbaşy District

Population (2022 official census)
  - Total: 20,720
- Time zone: UTC+5
- Postal code: 745190

Saparmyrat Türkmenbaşy, previously known as Oktyabrsk (in Russian: Октябрьск), is a city and capital of Saparmyrat Türkmenbaşy District, Daşoguz Province, Turkmenistan. In 2022, it had a population of 20,720 people.

== Etymology ==
The city was known as Oktyabrsk until 1993, in reference to the October Revolution.

In 1993, the town was renamed Saparmyrat Türkmenbaşy adyndaky şäher, which translates literally to "City named after Saparmyrat Türkmenbaşy." Saparmyrat Türkmenbaşy refers to Saparmyrat Nyýazow, first president of Turkmenistan who renamed himself "Türkmenbaşy," i.e. "Head/Leader of the Turkmen."

== History ==
Oktyabrsk has been designated as an urban-type settlement in 1984.

In 1993, the settlement was renamed to Saparmyrat Türkmenbaşy. On 13 June 2016, it was granted city status.

== Transports ==
The city has a railway station, which is the terminal on the dead-end branch of a railway line connecting Daşoguz and Xo‘jayli, Uzbekistan.

== See also ==
- Cities of Turkmenistan
- List of municipalities in Daşoguz Province
