= Akjemal Durdyýewa =

Turkmenistan politician

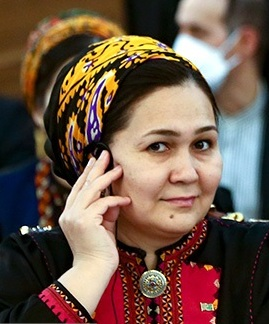
- Durdyýewa in 2023

Head of the Central Council of the Women's Union of Turkmenistan and Head of the National Center of Trade Unions
- Incumbent
- Assumed office August 2021
- President: Gurbanguly Berdimuhamedow; Serdar Berdimuhamedow
- Preceded by: Gurbangul Kakalyyevna Atayeva

Deputy Häkim of Daşoguz Region for Education, Culture, Healthcare and Sports
- In office January 2019 – August 2021
- President: Gurbanguly Berdimuhamedow

Personal details
- Born: Turkmenistan

Akjemal Kerimberdiýewna Durdyýewa is a Turkmen politician, who's currently serving as Head of the Central Council of the Women's Union of Turkmenistan and as Head of the National Center of Trade Unions since August 2021.

== Biography ==
In January 2019, Durdyýewa was appointed Deputy Hyakim of Dashoguz Velayat for Education, Culture, Healthcare and Sports by President of Turkmenistan, Gurbanguly Berdimuhamedow. She left the position in August 2021 for a new appointment.

In August 2021, Durdyýewa was appointed as Head of the Central Council of the Women’s Union of Turkmenistan and as Head of the National Center of Trade Unions, succeeding Gurbangul Kakalyyevna Atayeva. In this role, in 2021 she met virtually with the Ambassador of United Arab Emirates (UAE) to Turkmenistan, Ahmed Al Hay Al Hameli to discuss women's empowerment in both countries. In November 2023, Durdyýewa spoke as representative of the Central Council of the Women’s Union of Turkmenistan at an international conference on women’s empowerment in Baku, Azerbaijan.

Durdyýewa has raised awareness internationally of how modern contraceptives are provided by the Ministry of Health and Medical Industry of Turkmenistan since 2017.
