= Butentau =

Archaeological site

Butentau is an archaeological site in the Daşoguz region of Turkmenistan.

== Sites ==
=== Ibrahim Sultan Shrine ===
Three domed mausoleum, which were reconstructed by the Turkmen Government, stand atop an escarpment and function as a local shrine. They are believed to house the remains of Ibrahmin Sultan —a fakir from Arab— and his relatives, who had migrated to Butentau, to help the local people.

Behind the mausoleum lies a graveyard, where one "Shibli Baba" (Note: The particular grave is about 20m. long, apparently out of Baba's tall height. Even then, his lower right leg has to be buried separately at the bottom of escarpment.) remains buried along with others.

=== Cave Settlements ===
A chain of artificial caves, cut into the soft limestone riff, runs for about two kilometers and numbers into several hundred. They were settled in around early medieval times — currently, most are inaccessible without climbing equipment.

=== Ak Kala ===
A few hundred meters away from the cave-chain, lies the ruined late-medieval city of Adak. The city is roughly square in shape — a wall runs along the entire perimeter, interspersed with five semi-circular towers at each side and a round tower at each corner. In the north of the walled city, another enclosed space is present.
