= Shirvan Kala =

Village in Turkmenistan

Coordinates: 42°15′N 58°38′E

Shirvan Kala is a village in the Daşoguz region of Turkmenistan.

== Site ==
The village is named after an eponymous fortress, aside a plateau. Atop an adjacent hill, lies the Mausoleum of Nalach Baba. The Deryalyk Gas Compressor Station is nearby.

== Economy ==
UN/LOCODE designates Shirvan Kala as a probable road terminal, pending confirmation from Turkmen authorities. (Note: Read with UN/LOCODE MANUAL (PDF). UNITED NATIONS ECONOMIC COMMISSION FOR EUROPE. 2010. p. 7.)
