= Şabat, Turkmenistan =

Şabat: Nyýazow (1993–2022); Täzebazar (1957–1993); Andreyevsk (194?–1957); imeni Andreyeva (1938–194?); Täzä Bazar (?–1938)
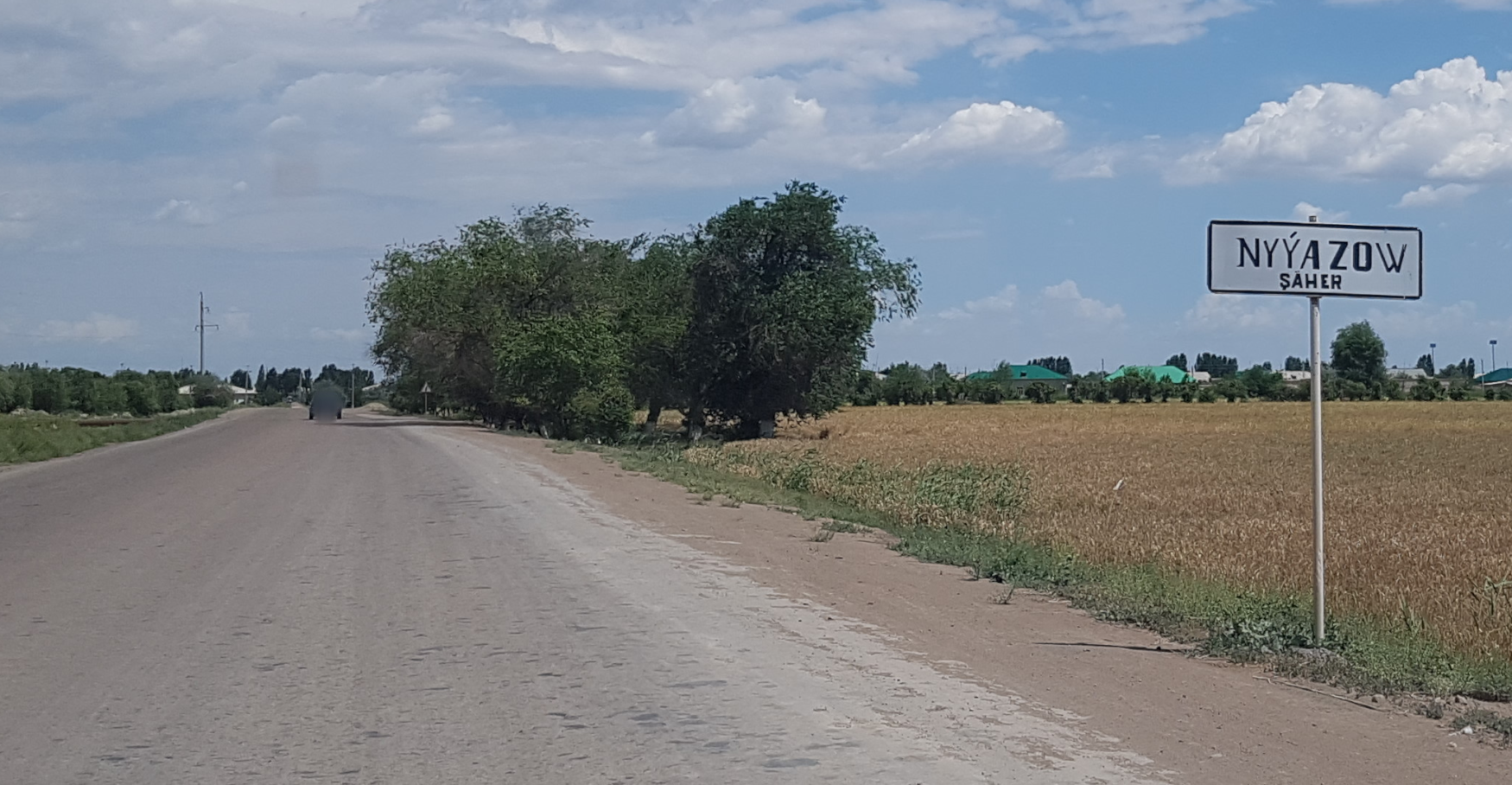

- Location in Turkmenistan Şabat (Asia)
- Coordinates: 41°50′N 60°08′E
- Country: Turkmenistan
- Region: Daşoguz Region
- District: Şabat District

Population (1989)
  - Total: 7,921
- Time zone: UTC+5
- Postal code: 746311
- Area code: +993-48

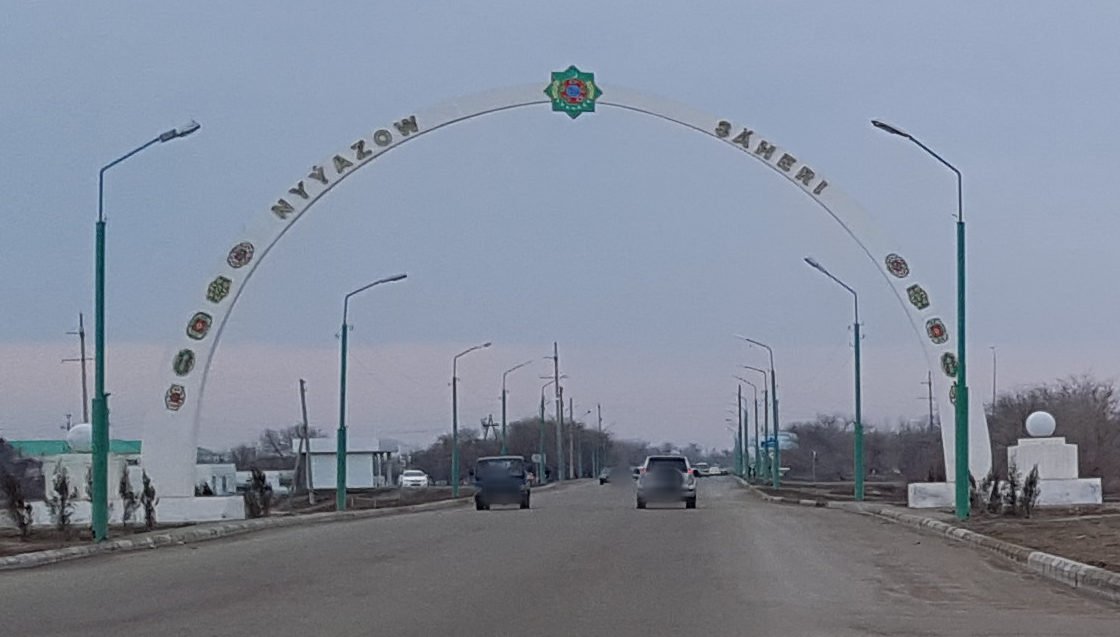
City arch in the downtown area of the city then called Nyyazow, Dashoguz Region, Turkmenistan

Şabat, previously called Nyýazow, Andreyevsk and Täzebazar, is a city subordinate to a district and the administrative center of Şabat District, Daşoguz Province, Turkmenistan. The city was renamed Şabat by decree of the Turkmen parliament on 9 November 2022.

== Etymology ==
The words Täze bazar mean in Turkmen "new bazaar", "new market". Atanyyazow explains that this name refers to a then-new bazaar set up at a crossroads of major routes leading to Uzbekistan and Turkmenistan. The name Nyýazow paid homage to Saparmyrat Nyýazow. The Turkmen government has not indicated the meaning behind the new name, Şabat. Atanyyazow explains that Şabat derives from şa (Persian "shah, king") and the Persian suffix ābād (آباد), meaning "cultivated place" (village, city, region). He notes that Anusha Khan of Khiva named a fortress in Khorezm thus after conquering the Iranian city Mashhad.

There's a city in the Xorazm Region of Uzbekistan, across from the border and 20km to the Southeast of Şabat, whose name has also been Shavat.

== History ==
As of 1957 the municipality was designated a town of urban type (Russian: посёлок городского типа). On 12 October 1957 by decree of the Presidium of the Supreme Soviet of the Turkmen SSR it was renamed from Andreyevsk to Täzebazar and was designated the administrative center of Daşoguz District. On 8 February 1993, by Parliamentary Resolution No. 806-XII, the town of Täzebazar was renamed town of Nyýazow. In June 2016, Nyýazow was upgraded to city status by decree of the Mejlis, and the village of Azatlyk was subordinated to it.

== Notable residents ==
- Bagtyýar Hojanyýazow, Turkmen ceramic artist

== Population ==
1959	1970	1979	1989
2302	3795	5263	7291
