= Al-Zamakhshari =

Scholar

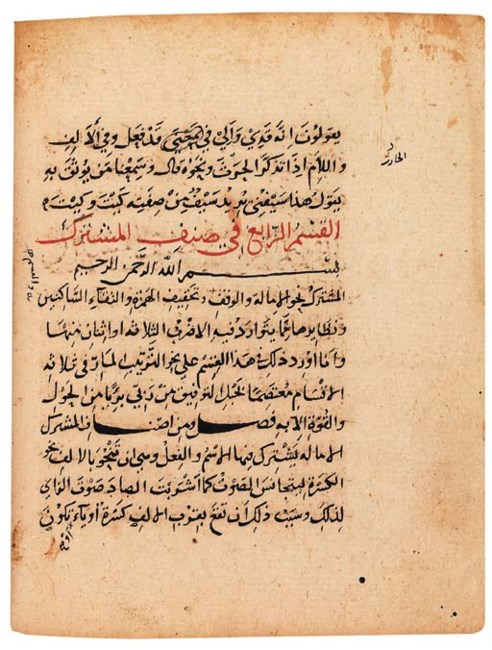
- Manuscript of al-Zamakhshari's Al-Mufassal; copy dated 13 August 1253
- Title: Al-Zamakhshari

Personal life
- Born: 18 March 1074 Zamakhshar, Khwarazm
- Died: 12 July 1143 (aged 69) Gurganj, Khwarazmian Empire
- Era: Islamic Golden Age

Religious life
- Religion: Islam
- Denomination: Mu'tazila
- Jurisprudence: Hanafi

Muslim leader
- Influenced by: Al-Qadi Abd al-Jabbar Abu Hanifa Al-Wahidi Abd al-Qahir al-Jurjani Ibn al-Malahimi
- Influenced: Al-Qifti

Abu al-Qasim Mahmud ibn Umar al-Zamakhshari (Arabic: الزمخشري; 1074 –1143) was a medieval Muslim scholar of Iranian descent. He travelled to Mecca and settled there for five years and has been known since then as 'Jar Allah' (God's Neighbor). He was a Mu'tazilite theologian, linguist, poet and interpreter of the Quran. He is best known for his book Al-Kashshaf, which interprets and linguistically analyzes Quranic expressions and the use of figurative speech for conveying meaning. This work is a primary source for all major linguists.

== Biography ==
His full name was Abu Al-Qasim Mahmoud ibn Omar ibn Mohammed ibn Omar Al-Khawarizmi Al-Zamakhshari. He was also referred to as "Fakhr Khawarizm" ("The Pride of Khwarazm") because people travelled to Khwarazm, a large oasis, to learn from him about the Quran and Arabic language. He was born on 18 March 1074 in Zamakhshar, which was a large city of Khwarazm at the time.

=== Life ===
Al-Zamakhshari grew up in Zamakhshar and studied there for a while, then he travelled to many places in Central Asia including the city of Bukhara in modern Uzbekistan, the Iranian cities of Khurasan and Isfahan, as well as Baghdad, where he met some political officials and praised them. The main reason for his travels was to learn more about poetry, religion and Arabic grammar. He travelled then to Makkah, where he met the prince at the time, Abi AlHasan Ali bin Hamzah bin Wahas Al-Shareef Al-Hasany, who had written extensively about Arabic prose and verse principles. After two years, Al-Zamakhshari went back to Khawarizim, but he could not resist his nostalgia for Makkah, the holy mosque, and his teachers there. So, he travelled again to Makkah and stayed for three years. Later, he travelled to Baghdad and then to Khawarizim where he died.

Al-Zamakhshari is reputed to have lost one of his legs, a fact that literature on his life explains variously. In one version of the story, Al-Damaghani stated that he asked Al-Zamakhshari about his leg, and he told him that when he was a child, he put a rope on a bird's leg. So, when the bird attempted to fly, its leg was cut off. Al-Zamakhsari's mother saw this and wished him the same, so he could feel the bird's pain. Later, on his way to Bukhara, he fell off the horse and broke his leg, and it was later amputated. Others like Ibn Khalkan argued that his constant travels in the very cold weather of Khawarizm were the reason for his leg loss.

=== Teachers ===
Al-Zamakhshari learned a lot from the well-known teachers at the time. One of his teachers was Abu Mudhar Mahmoud ibn Jarir Al-Dhabi Al-Asfahani who was called by his peers Fareed Asruh: ‘the most brilliant scholar of his time’. He taught Al-Zamakhshari syntax and literature. Al-Zamakhashari highly appreciated this teacher and was distraught when he died in 1113. Furthermore, Al-Zamakhshari studied literature and prosody from Abu Ali Al-Hasan bin Al-Mudhaffar Al-Nisaburi. He also drew some of his philosophico-religious ideas from his teachers Abu Mansur Nasr Al-Harthi, Abu Sa’ad Al-Shaga’I, and Abu Al-Khattab bin Al-Batar. While in Makkah, he learned about rhetoric and morphosyntax from Abu al-Hussain ali ibn Hamzah bin Wahas, who in turn learned from Al-Zamakhshari about Quranic interpretations and the principles governing the use of literary devices used in Quran.

=== Students ===
Al-Qafti (1172–1248) wrote in his book Akhbar Al-Olama ‘Scholars’ Biographies’ that students followed Al-Zamakhsahri wherever he traveled in order to learn from him. They would travel for months just to find him. Among his students in Zamakhshar were Abu Omar and Amer bin Hasan Al-Simsar. In Tabaristan the mountainous region located in the Caspian coast of northern Iran he taught Abu Al-Mahasin Isma’il ibn Abdullah Al-Tawaili, and in Abiward, he taught Abd Al-Rahim ibn Abd Allah Al-Barra. In Samarqand, some of his students were Ahmed ibn Mahmoud Al-Shati, Mohammad bin Abi Al-Qasim Al-Khawarizmi who was referred to as the top poet and syntactician of his time Abu Yusuf Ya’gub bin Ali Al-Balkhi a contributing linguist and poet, and Rashid Al-Din Al-Vatvat, a distinguished scholar in prose and verse.

=== Death ===
Al-Zamakhshari died in Gurgānj (known now as Konye-Urgench), the capital city of Turkmenistan, on 12 July 1143 AD (Monday, eve of 8th Dhu AlHijjah, 538 AH), aged 69.

== Linguistic approaches ==
Al-Zamakhshari was not exclusively committed to either the Basri nor the Kufi analytical approach over the other, but took from both what validated his hypotheses. Some attributed this linguistic behaviour to his Mu’tazalah philosophical ideas, which freed his soul and encouraged him to have a comprehensive perspective of life. Nevertheless, if there was a need to put his name under a specific school, then he would have followed the Baghdad school, whose approaches follow that of Al-Basri school in some cases while following Al-Kufi's approaches in others. A teaching of the Basri school is regarding the verb in ((هل زيد قام؟ ‘Did Zayd stand?’ as a subject of an elided verb expressed by the verb قام ‘stand’. On the other hand, the Kufi school rejects viewing the noun as a subject, and argues that it is a topic. Another example showing where he followed the Kufi school is analyzing the verb حدّث ‘tell’ as a verb that takes three objects. As in, فمن حدثتموهـ له علينا العلاء ‘the one you told about the priority’, where the 1st object is ‘the one’, the 2nd is the attached pronoun to the verb هـ, and the 3rd is the prepositional phrase. However, the Basri school rejected this view and regarded ‘tell’ as a ditransitive verb.

== Accomplishments ==
=== Al-Kashshaf ===
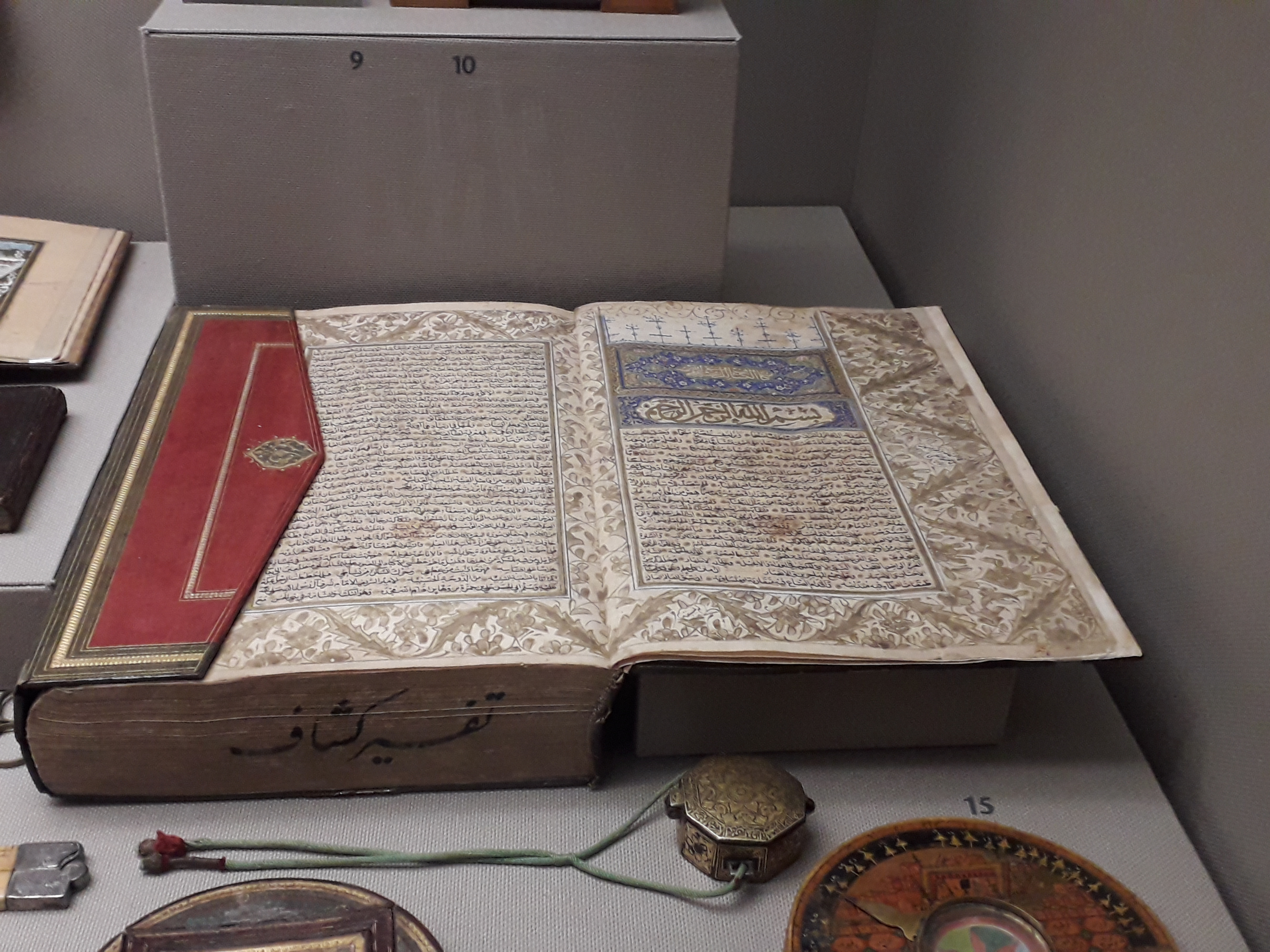
Quran annotated by Zamakhshari dating to 1346 or 1347

Al-Kashshaf (a.k.a. 'The Revealer; Quran Interpretation’) was written in the 12th century. It is the best known work of Al-Zamakhshari. Indeed, many linguists throughout history have attributed Al-Zamakhshari's fame to this book. The name of this book (Al-Kashshaf) is derived from the verb kashaf ‘to uncover’. Thus, this book attempts to uncover the syntactic and semantic ambiguities of Quranic expressions. In the text, Al-Zamakhshari explained his motivation, impetus and goals for constructing it. In fact, he once admitted that he was hesitant to write this book, as he thought he might not have the skills needed to interpret the Quran appropriately. He said that whenever he was teaching his students and mentioning a Quranic verse, his students seemed to learn new meanings they have never come across before. As he continued to do that, students were more interested in Quranic interpretation than in other subject matters. So, when he told them he would write a book about all those meanings, they could not wait and encouraged him.

This book begins with an introduction in which Al-Zamakhshari provides his readers with a brief autobiography and his rationale for composing the text. The following pages provide the resources used in this book. Then the book begins providing interpretations for Quranic verses in the exact order they appear in the Quran. The book then concludes with two pages where the editor provided a biography about Al-Zamakhshari and praised him as a respected figure whose contributions extended to the religious, linguistic, and literary aspects of life.

This book was a primary source for linguists as well as learners of Arabic and Quran, regardless of its Mu’tazile approach, a rationalist school of Islamic theology in Baghdad and AlBasrah. In fact, most of the following scholars used Al-Zamakhshari's stylistic, semantic and syntactic approaches when composing their works. In this book, Al-Zamakhshari tried to show the beauty and richness of the Arabic language, derive proverbs, explain expressions with multiple meanings, and dive into the science of rhetoric.

Among the features that distinguish this book is its understandable language even for learners of Arabic and its lack of redundancy. Another feature is that it depends on Arab speakers’ styles of communicating meanings and using their figurative speech. Moreover, the method of explanation followed the question/answer pattern, starting with ‘if I told you…. What would you say?’ and the answer would be ‘I say….’. Ibn Khaldun (1332 –1406) in Al-Muqadimah ‘The Introduction’ (1377) says that this interrogative style is what made it easier to follow for readers of different educational backgrounds.

After the great fame that this book enjoyed, many scholars wrote commentaries, such as Al-Imam Nasser Al-Deen Ahmed bin Mohammed ibn Al-Mouneer who wrote Al-Intissaf ‘Equality’, Kamal Basha Al-Mufty, Khair Ad-Deen Khidhr Al-A’utufi, Sun’u Allah ibn Ja’afar Al-Mufty and Alam Ad-Deen Abd Al-Kareem bin Ali Al-Iraqi. Others preferred to summarize it, such as Mohammad bin Ali Al-Ansari, Nasser Al-Deen Omar bin Abdullah Al-Bidhawi, Qutub Ad-Deen Mohammed bin Masoud Al-Syrafi and Abd AlAwwal bin Hussain, who was known as Om Walad.

=== Al-Mofassal Fi Sina’at Al-E’rab ===
Al-Zamakhshari's Al-Mofassal Fi Sina’at Al-E’rab ‘Detailed Analyses of Arabic Parsing’ (1120 – 1122 AD) is considered by Arabic grammarians to be one of the most influential books about Arabic syntax (and morphosyntax). Indeed, some grammarians believed that it is the second syntactic book after Sibawayh's books on Arabic grammar because Al-Zamakhshari talked about every syntactic and morphological aspect of the Arabic language. He started writing this book towards the end of 513 AH and finished it at the beginning of 515 AH (1122 AD), which means that it did not take him more than a year and four months. This work has been celebrated throughout history by different linguists and was translated in the modern era to different languages, such as German in 1873.

Al-Zamakhshari believed that interpreting the Quran was not an easy task. This seemed only possible for educated linguists whose language is pure Arabic, and who have achieved a deep knowledge of the different syntactic and semantic relations that different structures could bear. Indeed, he believed that trying to interpret the Quran without having linguistic knowledge might result in a false interpretation of God's intended meanings and cause further problems, as the Quran is the major source upon which all life matters are based. Since the language of the Quran is Arabic, Al-Zamakhshari thought that writing this book would help people better grasp the richness of the Arabic language and better understand its different interpretations.

Knowing that Al-Zamakhshari was a voracious reader, he might have looked at some syntactic books of other great grammarians and might have considered them disorganized. Thus, he intended to provide a better organization of the syntactic and morphological aspect of Arabic grammar to facilitate understanding, an aim he stated at the beginning of his book. So, he began his book with a brief introduction writing about the reasons that motivated him to come up with this work, then he divided his book into four major chapters, as follows:

According to Grodzki (2011), what distinguishes Al-Mofassal Fi Sina’at Al-E’rab from other Arabic syntactic books is Al-Zamakhshari's attempt to avoid digression to allow his readers to follow smoothly, which is the result of giving each topic its deserved time and space. He considered Al-Zamakhshari's style to be clear, simple, and succinct. He also believed that Al-Zamakhshari did not attempt to extensively explain his ideas unless they addressed grammatical issues raised in the Quran or poetry, in which case he provided his readers with detailed explanations.

This linguistic work enjoyed attention since the time it saw the light. Many linguists and scientists wrote books explaining, comparing, or commenting on this work. Jurji Zaydan once wrote in his 1943 book Tarikh Adab Al-Lughah Al-Arabiyyah ‘History of Arabic Language Literature’ that the reason Al-Zamakhshari's Al-Muffassal was accepted by people is that King Issa Ibn Ayyob — who was a syntactician — admired this book and assigned 100 Dinar and a house to whoever memorized it. Moreover, this book was one of the (few and) most influential books taught in Al-Sham (Syria, Jordan, Lebanon and Palestine), Egypt, Iraq, Al-Hijaz (the Western part of Saudi Arabia) and Yemen throughout the 7th and 8th centuries AH (1204 – 1301 AD). Indeed, its influence went further to reach Al-Andalus (the Iberian Peninsula) where people were also interested in the Arabic language.

=== Asas Al-Balaghah ===
Asas Al-Balaghah ‘The Foundation of Eloquence’ (first published in 1998) is a thesaurus and dictionary of Arabic words. For each word, Al-Zamakhshari provided its meaning, some of its uses in the Quran, Muhammad's sayings, poetry, or proverbs. Furthermore, he represented and analyzed some uses of this word in figurative speech and provided contexts where it can be found in everyday language. The content of this text was organized alphabetically. This work was best known as the earliest fully alphabetical lexicography that combines literal definitions and metaphorical material. He excluded rare or borrowed words. His goal was to highlight that word choice can play a significant role in enhancing the rhetoric of a text or speech.

=== Maqamat Al-Zamakhshari ===
Maqamat Al-Zamakhshari ‘Al-Zamakhshari's Principles’ (first published in 1982) is a literary work. It began with an introduction praising God for all his blessings and asking readers to carefully read this book and understand the purpose behind the use of each word. Al-Zamakhshari then provided a religious sermon followed by his fifty principles. Those principles talked about different topics. Some of them were about generosity, seriousness, bravery, thanking, advice-giving, death, syntax, prosody, and the life of Arabs in the past.

== Assessments ==
Some of the 7th and 8th centuries scholars have attributed different points of view to Al-Zamakhshari on different topics. However, some books and other historical pieces of evidence from the 7th century showed that some of these views attributed to him were not based on sound ground and that most judgments lacked supporting evidence. One of the competing claims about Al-Zamakhshari is his analysis of the co-occurrence of the interrogative prefix /ʔ-/ with the conjunction words in Arabic, especially in Quranic verses.

=== Interrogative particle al-hamza /ʔ-/ ===
In Arabic, the interrogative prefix /ʔ-/ attaches to nominal and verbal sentences to form a yes/no question. Thus, it is used to check information and ask for confirmation or verification. Most of the time, it is prioritized in a sentence, so it may precede conjunction particles, prepositions, the complementizer [ʔnna] and direct objects (in case of verbal sentences). Indeed, this prefix is viewed as the default interrogative in Arabic. However, other interrogative particles (which are used to ask yes/no questions or those similar to English wh-question words) usually follow conjunctions, namely [wa], [fa] and [θumma], as in:

(فهل يهلك إلَا القوم الفاسقون)

Fa hal yuhlaku illa ʔal-qawm-u ʔal-fasiqu:n

CONJ. INTROG. destroy-PRES except DEF-people-NOM DEF-immoral

“Shall any be destroyed except those who transgress?” (The Quran, 46:35)

When using the interrogative bound morpheme /ʔ-/, most of the time that it precedes any conjunctions, as in:

(أو كلَما عاهدوا عهداً)

ʔ-wa kull-ma ʕahad-u ʕahd-an

INTROG-CONJ every-time promise(V)-3rd Pl promise-Acc

       “Has it not always been so that every time they made a covenant?” (The Quran, 2:100)[18]

In this view, Arabic syntacticians had different analyses: some of them like Sibawahi (as well as some other Arab linguists of Al-Basrah) believed that when this interrogative prefix precedes conjunctions, it appears in its default position, but may sometimes follow conjunctions. They also believed that the sentence after the conjunction is conjoined to the sentence before both the conjunction particle and the interrogative suffix.

Al-Zamakhshari had another opinion. He was among a group who believed that the default position of the interrogative particle is sentence-initially but argued that the sentence after the conjunction is conjoined to an elided sentence between the interrogative prefix and the conjunction particle. In his book, Al-Kashshaf, he brought many examples and tried to account for the elliptical structures they had. For example, he believed that a question like (أفلم يسيروا؟) which translates as “and have not they travelled?" is a surface representation of the original structure (أمكثوا فلم يسيروا؟) which translates as “Have they stayed, and not traveled?”

In light of this, Ibn Hisham an 8th-century Egyptian grammarian argued that Al-Zamakhshari was the first one to make this analysis, arguing for an elliptical structure between the interrogative prefix and the conjunction particle. On the other hand, Abu Hayyan a 10th-century linguist and philosopher agreed with Sibawahi and strongly rejected Al-Zamakhsahri's analysis, and indeed called it the “Zamakhshariyyan trend”.

Still, another linguist known as Al-Dosugi disagreed with Ibn Hisham's view that Al-Zamakhshari was the first one to come up with this analysis; rather, he was convinced that Al-Zamakhshari's analysis is a follow-up of what other earlier linguists had already discussed, but Al-Dosugi was not sure who first came up with this analysis. This view seemed to have a supporting piece of evidence because Ibn Hayyan said that Mohammad bin Masoud Al-Ghazni argued for an elided verbal phrase between the interrogative prefix and the conjunction particle, but the literature about this linguist and his analytical approaches seem to be very limited. Nevertheless, historical references showed that he (i.e., Mohammad bin Masoud Al-Ghazni) died in 1029 AD, whereas Al-Zamakhshari was born in 1074 AD. This verifies what Al-Dosugi argued for and proves that Al-Zamakhshari was a follower, not an initiator, of this analytical approach.

=== Zamakhsharyyan Lan ===
Zamakhsharyyan Lan ‘Al-Zamakhshari's Negation’ was another topic that divided scholars to agree or disagree with him. In his view, Al-Zamakhshari defined the negation particle lan as a particle that negates present tense verbs with present and future references. To him, it is like ‘never’ in English where it has a sense of continuous negation, i.e., where negation extends beyond the present to negate any possible chances for a particular event or state to take place in the future (cf. He is not married. He will never get married). Al-Zamakhshari gave various examples to validate his analysis, such as:

1). When Prophet Mousa asked God if he could see Him, God replied:

(لن تراني)

lan t-aran-i

NEG 3rd Sg.PRES-see-OBJ.PRO

“You will never see me” (The Quran, 7:143)

2). When God said that those whom people invoke besides Him will never be able to create a fly even if they gathered together for that purpose:

(لن يخلقوا ذباباً)

lan ya-khlouq-ou thobab-an

NEG PRES-create-3rd PL fly-ACC

“They can never create a fly” (The Quran, 22:73)

However, some 8th century scholars such as Ibn Hisham believed that Al-Zamakhsari regarded lan as a continuous negation particle because he was deeply influenced by the philosophical ideas of his Mu’tazile approach. That is because this is the way the Mu’tazile people interpret the Quran, which is not the way all other Muslims do. For instance, example (1) above shows how Mu’tazile people believe that they will never be able to see God in the afterlife, and this is the approach Al-Zamakhshari followed in his semantic and syntactic analysis of the Quran. However, all Muslims (who do not follow the Mu'tazile approach), believe the opposite, as it is actually stated in the Quran that believers will, indeed, be able to see God:

وُجُوهٌ يَوْمَئِذٍ نَاضِرَةٌ * إِلَى رَبِّهَا نَاظِرَةٌ ﴾ [القيامة: 22، 23]﴿

"Some faces, that Day, will beam (in brightness and beauty) * Looking towards their Lord" (The Quran, 75: 22,23)

As for lan, Ibn Hisham also had a different opinion, as he regarded it as a normal negative particle that does not bear a continuous negation sense. He defended his view by some examples from the Quran, as follows:

3). When God said about the disbelievers that they will never wish to die:

(لن يتمنوه أبداً)

Lan ya-tamana-au-hu abad-an

NEG PRES-wish-3rd PL-OBJ.PRO never-ACC

“They will never long for it” (The Quran, 2:95) In this example, Ibn Hisham argued against Al-Zamakhshari's view because he believed that if lan had a continuous negation sense, then it would be redundant to say abadanan ‘never’ in the same verse, which is never the case. So, this proves that lan acts as a normal negative particle, like ‘not’ in English.

4). When God asked Mary to tell people that she vowed a fast unto the Most Gracious (Allah), so she shall not speak to any human being:

(فلن أكلم اليوم إنسياً)

f-lan u-kalim al-yaoum insiy-an

then-NEG 1st SG.PRES-speak DEF-day human-ACC

“So, I shall not speak to any human being today” (The Quran, 19:26)

In this example, Ibn Hisham also refuted Al-Zamakhshari's view because if lan meant ‘never’, then why its meaning would be constricted by the time adverbial word ‘today’ in the same verse? This again proved that Al-Zamkhsahri's analysis of lan as a continuous negator is not applicable and is mainly affected by his theological ideas.
