= Gurbansoltan Eje District =

Gurbansoltan Eje District Gurbansoltan Eje Etraby
- District
- Country: Turkmenistan
- Province: Daşoguz Province
- Time zone: UTC+5 (+5)

Gurbansoltan Eje District (formerly Yylanly District) was until 2022 a district of Daşoguz Province in Turkmenistan. The district was named after Gurbansoltan Eje, former president Saparmurat Niyazov's mother. On 9 November 2022 by decree of the Turkmen parliament the district was abolished and its territory transferred to Akdepe District.
