= Boldumsaz =

- Location in Turkmenistan
- Coordinates: 42°08′N 59°40′E
- Country: Turkmenistan
- Province: Daşoguz Province
- District: Boldumsaz District
- Postal code: 745190

Boldumsaz, formerly Kalinin and Voro’silovabad, is a city and capital of Boldumsaz District in the Daşoguz Province of Turkmenistan.

== Etymology ==
Scholars hold the name of the place to mean "Fortress in a Marshy Place"; a fortress, atop a square plateau, is visible from afar.

Local people argue a different etymology infusing folk-lore. The local Khan commissioned an architect to build the tallest minaret of the world at some place nearby but planned to execute him post-completion, lest he would replicate the designs elsewhere. The architect got to know of this plan, used his resources to construct wings, and flew away from the minaret. Landing at the fortress, he exclaimed the Turkmen equivalent of "Safe and Sound", which changed to the current name of the city with passage of time.

== History ==
The city has been identified with the medieval town of Nyzvar, which was sacked by Mongols; however, this identification has been contested. During the Soviet period it was called Kalinin, in honor of Mikhail Kalinin. It was renamed briefly Voro’shilovabad after Kliment Voroshilov. On 5 May 1993, Presidential Decree No. 1327 assigned the present name.
