= Gubadag =

Gubadag Telmansk (1949-1993) Town Named for Thälmann (Cyrillic Russian: посёлок имени Тельмана) (1938-1949) Täzä-Gala Cyrillic Таза-Кала (?-1938)
- Location in Turkmenistan
- Coordinates: 42°04′N 59°58′E
- Country: Turkmenistan
- Province: Daşoguz Province
- District: Gubadag District
- Postal code: 745190

Gubadag is a city in Gubadag District in Daşoguz Province of Turkmenistan. Gubadag is known for its special round meat pie, known as fitchi (Turkmen: "fitçi"; Russian: "фитчи"). The city is located on the border with Karakalpakstan (Uzbekistan), near Mang‘it.

Until December 1938 the city was named Täzä-Kala (Turkmen: Täze gala)(English: new fortress). From 1938 until 1949 it was called Town Named for Thälmann (Russian: посёлок имени Тельмана), a russification of the last name of Ernst Thälmann (1886-1944), a German Communist involved in the international communist movement. In 1949 this was abbreviated to Telmansk (Russian: Тельманск). The name was changed to Gubadag in 1993 by Presidential Decree No. 1327.

== Etymology ==
Frank's and Touch-Werner's dictionary defines guba as "reddish-brown" and dag as "mountain". Atanyyazow asserts the name derives from the reddish-brown hills in the vicinity.
