= Ruhubelent =

- Town
- Ruhubelent şäherçesi
- Location in Turkmenistan Ruhubelent (Asia)
- Coordinates: 41°44′12″N 58°41′58″E
- Country: Turkmenistan
- Province: Daşoguz Province
- District: Ruhubelent District
- Established: April 2007
- Time zone: UTC+5

Ruhubelent is a town and the administrative center of Ruhubelent District of Daşoguz Province, Turkmenistan. The district was established in April 2007 and the town of Ruhubelent was founded on 17 October 2008.

== Etymology ==
The word ruhubelent in Turkmen means "inspiring, inspirational". It is a loanword of Persian origin, composed of "ruh" (روح)(spirit) and "buland" (بلند)(tall), originally meaning "tall-spirited".

== Amenities ==
Facilities in Ruhubelent include the district governor's office, a police station, district prosecutor, national security office, courthouse, 320-seat school house, house of culture, 50-bed hospital, outpatient clinic, kindergarten, 24 two-story duplex houses, water purification plant, shopping mall, telephone and electrical service, railroad station, and a bank branch.

== Transportation ==
The town is served by the Trans-Karakum Railway that connects Ashgabat and Daşoguz as well as the Ashgabat-Dashoguz Automobile Highway.
