= Andalyp (city) =

Andalyp Gurbansoltan Eje adyndaky (2004-2022) Ýylanly (~1992-2004) Ilyaly (Cyrillic Ильялы) (?-~1992)
- Location in Turkmenistan
- Coordinates: 41°50′N 59°39′E
- Country: Turkmenistan
- Province: Daşoguz Province
- District: Akdepe District

Population (2022 census)
  - Total: 36,594
- Time zone: UTC+5

Andalyp (Arabic Alphabet: عاندالیٛپ), until 2004 called Ýylanly, and from 2004 to 2022 called Gurbansoltan Eje adyndaky, is a city and capital of Akdepe District in Daşoguz Province, Turkmenistan.

== Etymology ==
On 9 November 2022 by parliamentary resolution the city was renamed in honor of the poet Nurmuhammet Andalyp (نورمحمد عندلیب). Prior to that, on 6 September 2004 by Parliamentary Resolution 227-II the city was renamed in honor of the mother of President Saparmurat Niyazov, Gurbansoltan Eje. Originally it was named Ilyaly (Cyrillic Ильялы, the meaning of which is obscure) but by no later than 1992 had been renamed Ýylanly, which in Turkmen means "with snakes". Atanyyazow explains that this city, along with several other locations in Turkmenistan, received that name due to an abundance of snakes in the area.

== History ==
In the Soviet period Ýylanly was designated as an "urban-type settlement" (Russian: посёлок городского типа) and administrative center of Ýylanly District. In June 2016 by parliamentary decree Gurbansoltan eje adyndaky was upgraded to the status of "city in a district" (Turkmen: etrapdaky şäher). The same decree subordinated the villages of Hazarasp, Garamergen, and Depmechi to the city. By parliamentary decree of 9 November 2022, the city was made capital of Akdepe District.

The Great Soviet Encyclopedia, 3rd edition, published between 1969 and 1986, noted that the city offered a cotton ginning plant as well as a folk theater.

== Population ==
Year	1959	1970	1979	1989	2010	2022
Population	5,308	8,922	12,206	16,936	27,455	36,594
