= Ruhubelent District =

Ruhubelent District Ruhubelent etraby
- District
- Country: Turkmenistan
- Province: Daşoguz Province
- Capital: Ruhubelent
- Established: April 2007

Area
  - Total: 17,820 km^{2} (6,880 sq mi)

Population (2022 census)
  - Total: 28,172
  - Density: 1.581/km^{2} (4.095/sq mi)
- Time zone: UTC+5

Ruhubelent District (Turkmen: Ruhubelent etraby, Рухубелент этрабы) is a district of Daşoguz Province, Turkmenistan. The administrative center of the district is the town of Ruhubelent. The district was established April 2007 and the town of Ruhubelent was founded on 17 October 2008.

The "virgin district" was formed on 400 thousand hectares of the Shasenem Prairie (Russian: массив Шасенем) specifically for cultivation of wheat, cotton, and pasturage. Şabat Open Joint Stock Company operates a dairy farm in Ruhubelent District.

== Transportation ==
The district is served by the Trans-Karakum Railway that connects Ashgabat and Daşoguz as well as the Ashgabat-Dashoguz Automobile Highway.

== Administrative Subdivisions ==
- Cities (şäherler)
  - N/A
- Towns (şäherçeler)
  - Ruhubelent
- Village councils (geňeşlikler)
  - Aşyk Aýdyň (Aşyk Aýdyň, Bagşyly, Akarýap, Kuwwat, Oguzboýy, Wasabat, Uzboý)
  - Diýarbekir (Diýarbekir, Şähribossan)
  - Geňeş (Geňeş, Agzybirlik, Çardepe, Parahat, Şagadam, Oglanly)
  - Ruhnama (Ruhnama, Oguzhan)
  - Şagadam (Türkmenistan, Altyn sähra, Bereketli, Duzgyr, Täzeoba, Yslam, Çaýyrly, Gyzyljaburun)
  - Şabende (Şabende, Çalymergen, Maňgyrabat, Magrupy adyndaky, Maňgyr, Täzeýer)
  - Tünüderýa (Tünüderýa, Galkynyş, Garagum, Gäwersgyr, Şasenem, Altyn zaman)
  - Ýomut Durdyýew adyndaky (Egriguýy)
  - Zähmet (Toprakgala, Çardere, Was, Wasgala)
