= Gubadag District =

Gubadag District Gurbadag Etraby
- District
- Interactive map of Gubadag District
- Country: Turkmenistan
- Province: Daşoguz Province
- Capital: Gubadag
- Time zone: UTC+5 (+5)

Gubadag District is a district of Daşoguz Province in Turkmenistan.
