= Görogly District =

Görogly District Görogly Etraby Tagta until 2002
- District
- Interactive map of Görogly District
- Country: Turkmenistan
- Region: Daşoguz Region
- Capital: Görogly

Area
  - Total: 14,800 km^{2} (5,700 sq mi)

Population (2022)
  - Total: 164,894
  - Density: 11.1/km^{2} (28.9/sq mi)
- Time zone: UTC+5

Görogly District (formerly Tagta District) is a district in Daşoguz Region, northern Turkmenistan. Its administrative centre is the city of Görogly. The district had a population of 164,894 inhabitants according to the 2022 Turkmenistan census and is a significant producer of winter wheat in the region. The district is also the birthplace of the medieval Islamic scientist and writer Mahmud Zamakhshari.

== Name ==
Formerly named the Tagta District, in September 2002, Saparmurat Niyazov, the President of Turkmenistan, announced the renaming of the district to Görogly. This was done to foster pride in the Turkmen traditions and following the wishes of the population of the Daşoguz Region.

== Administration ==
The administrative centre of the Görogly District is the city of Görogly, since June 2016. The district is divided into fourteen village councils (geňeşlikler): Annagylyç Ataýew adyndaky, Aksaraý, Balyş Öwezow adyndaky, Bereket, Durdy Gylyç adyndaky, Garagum, Hüdük Myradow adyndaky, Magtymguly adyndaky, Bedirkent, Türkmenistan, Türkmenýoly, Yzmykşir, Ýagtylyk, and Zaman.

== Demographics ==
Based on the 2022 Turkmenistan census, published by the State Committee for Statistics, Görogly had a population of 164,894 inhabitants. The area of the district is 14,800 square kilometres (5,700 sq mi), meaning a population density of 11.14 inhabitants per square kilometre. The district had slightly more females with 83,771 (50.8%), in comparison to 81,123 (49.2%) males and a mostly rural lifestyle with a majority of 138,124 (83.8%) inhabitants living in rural areas and 26,770 (16.2%) inhabitants living in urban areas.

== Economy ==
An important part of the economy in Görogly District is agriculture, and especially production of winter wheat. The district is identified by the Government of Turkmenistan as one of the consistently reliable producers in the Daşoguz Region. This includes the Aksaraý Daikhan Association earning a distinguished place as a significant contributor to the grain harvest in Daşoguz, harvesting a 1,110 hectare wheat crop in 2026.

== Notable people ==
Mahmud Zamakhshari was a medieval Islamic scientist, philosopher, theologian, philologist, and writer born in 1075 in Zamakhshar (now known as Izmukshir), located in the territory of the current Görogly District. He became renowned for his contributions to Arabic linguistics.
