= Akdepe District =

Coordinates: 42.05°N 59.383331°E

Akdepe District Akdepe etraby
- District
- Interactive map of Akdepe District
- Country: Turkmenistan
- Province: Daşoguz Province
- Capital: Andalyp (Akdepe before 9 Nov. 2022)

Area
  - Total: 4,350 sq mi (11,270 km^{2})

Population (2022 census)
  - Total: 340,930
  - Density: 78.35/sq mi (30.25/km^{2})
- Time zone: UTC+5 (+5)

Akdepe District (Turkmen: Akdepe etraby, Акдепе этрабы) is a district of Daşoguz Province in Turkmenistan. The administrative center of the district is the town of Akdepe.

On 9 November 2022 by decree of the Turkmen parliament Gurbansoltan Eje District was abolished and its territory transferred to this district.

== Administrative Subdivisions ==
- Cities (şäherler)
  - Akdepe
  - Andalyp
- Towns (şäherçeler)
  - Orazgeldi Ärsaryýew adyndaky (Formerly called Ataýap)
  - Rejepguly Ataýew adyndaky (Formerly called Päkize)
- Village councils (geňeşlikler)
  - Agöýli (Allaýaroý, Galaýer, Küle, Üzümbag)
  - Agzybirlik (R.Ataýew adyndaky, Garaagaç, Kürt, Onbegi, Sabyrly, Täte)
  - Ak altyn (Täzeýol, Ak altyn, Akja, Bagtyly, Gamyşlyk, Pekgeý, Tekeli)
  - Akdepe (Zähmet, Çoçun, Ýekederek, Gyzanýap)
  - Ak bugdaý (Magtymoý)
  - Altyn toprak (Keneges, Agar, Dörmen, Garaşsyzlyk, Göwender)
  - Atçapan (Gyzylýap, Bereketli, Magtymguly adyndaky)
  - Döwletmämmet Azady adyndaky (Alilioý, Keýigoý)
  - Gorkut (Derekli)
  - Gyzyltakyr (Basuwly, Burunjyk, Gyzyltakyr)
  - Mollanepes adyndaky (Watan, Akgaş, Atçapan, Garaja, Täze mekan, Garataýly, Göwdük, Tekebeg, Täzedurmuş, Toýnuk)
  - Magtymguly Garlyýew adyndaky (Arap, Alili, Jerenli, Polatly, Ussaly, Ýekeagaç)
  - Nowruz (Sekizatlyk, Darylyoý, Bereket, Şasenem, Ýekesöwüt)
  - Nurmuhammet Andalyp adyndaky (Andalyp, Garamazy, Düýeçi, Könegala, Torgaý)
  - Orazgeldi Ärsaryýew adyndaky (Ataýap, Garaboýnak, Gasymhowly, Jemşidi, Baglyk)
  - Pagtaçylyk (Medet, Daýhan, Gazakly, Garrawy, Agzybirlik, Pagtaçylyk, Üçýap)
  - Rejepguly Ataýew adyndaky (Päkize, Bagty, Bamyly, Çildir, Gyzyl, Keşler, Meňiş, Omarly, Orman)
  - Sapyş Çerkezow adyndaky (Magaryf, Çarwalyk, Köpükli)
  - Sazanda (Sazanda, Azatlyk, Bagşyly, Begleroba)
  - Sazakly (Ketgenli, Pagtabaz, Bitaraplyk, Sazaklyoý, Ýaldyrýap)
  - Şabat (Magtym, Çandyr, Derýalyk, Gülüstan, Şarlawuk, Üçkepderi)
  - Sähra (Saýat, Ýeketut, Üçagaç, Tokaýlyoba)
  - Täzeoba (Türkmenistan, Çatagaç, Maşrykýap)
  - Täzezaman (Bagly, Dörtýap, Galkynyş, Heşdekler, Janam, Täzeçitir)
  - Üçkepderi (Dostluk, Sözenli, Altyn asyr, Atamyrat aga)

== Health ==
The Daşoguz Sanatorium is located in the Akdepe District, Daşoguz Region. The healing properties of the sanatorium's natural water have been known since 1978, when the source was discovered during a geological expedition. The water, found at a depth of 1,200 meters and with a temperature of 54°C, is classified as iodine-bromine mineral water, beneficial for treating conditions related to the musculoskeletal system, nervous system, urinary and reproductive systems, skin, and endocrine disorders. Due to its high mineral content, the water is used externally in baths and showers rather than for drinking.

In accordance with a government decree, a new 200-bed facility equipped with modern medical technologies was constructed. The building includes diagnostic and hydrotherapy departments, patient rooms, and a cafeteria. The sanatorium provides treatments such as paraffin therapy, laser therapy, magnetotherapy, hydrotherapy, and various therapeutic baths, enhancing rehabilitation and recovery for its visitors.
