= Şabat District =

Şabat District Şabat etraby (Turkmen): Saparmyrat Nyýazow District (1992–2022); Tashauz District (1970–1992)
- District
- Interactive map of Şabat District
- Country: Turkmenistan
- Province: Daşoguz Province
- Capital: Şabat

Area
  - Total: 7,179 km^{2} (2,772 sq mi)

Population (2022 census)
  - Total: 218,075
  - Density: 30.38/km^{2} (78.68/sq mi)
- Time zone: UTC+5 (+5)

Şabat District (Turkmen: Şabat Etraby), formerly Saparmyrat Nyýazow District and Tashauz District is a district of Daşoguz Province in Turkmenistan. The administrative center of the district is the city of Şabat.

== History ==
Until 27 October 1924, it was one of 5 district shuros in the Turkmen region of the Khorezm People's Soviet Republic (KPSR). In July 1930, when Tashauz District was abolished, and it became directly subordinate to the government of the Turkmen SSR. In February 1932, the district was transferred to the restored Tashauz district.

In November 1939, when the Tashauz district was reabolished, the district was transferred to the newly formed Tashauz region. In January 1963, the Tashauz region was abolished, thus causing Tashauz to become directly subordinate to the Turkmen SSR government. In December 1970, the district was transferred to the restored Tashauz region. In 1992, the Tashauz district was renamed Saparmyrat Nyýazow District (in honour of Saparmyrat Nyýazow) and became part of Daşoguz Province.

On 9 November 2022, the Turkmen parliament decreed the name be changed to Şabat, along with the district's eponymous capital city.

== Awards ==
In February 2021, President Gurbanguly Berdimuhamedow awarded the district a prize of one million U.S. dollars as the nation's "best district" in 2020. At the awards ceremony, the district was noted for having produced 41,500 tonnes of raw cotton and 32,000 tonnes of wheat in 2020, as well as "weighty" harvests of "potato and other vegetables."

== Administrative Subdivisions ==
- Cities (şäherler)
  - Şabat
- Towns (şäherçeler)
  - Sadylla Rozmetow adyndaky (formerly Gülüstan)
- Village councils (geňeşlikler)
  - Adalat (Garaporsaň, Garawuldepe, Garaýabyly)
  - Altynýol (Dilewar, Agzybirlik, Şorýer)
  - Alyşir Nowaýy adyndaky (Hemzeşyh, Birinji Gulan, Daýhanazat, Gamyşkak, Gumgala, Ikinji Gulan)
  - Asudalyk (Maýlyjeňňel, Bozgala, Täzeusul)
  - Berkarar (Guljangala)
  - Biruni adyndaky (Bagban, Mehinli)
  - Bossan (Helleň, Alyşir Nowaýy adyndaky, Mädorazbatyr, Sekizöýli, Şabat)
  - Diýar (Abdalýap, Aýakketli, Galkynyş, Ogşak)
  - Gaýrat (Ýaňyýol, Jemşit, Ulugbeg, Täzedurmuş)
  - Gülüstan (Parahat, Öwezaly, Şark, Ýoldaş Ahmedow adyndaky)
  - Hasylçy (Altmyş, Hasylçy, Boz, Diwanbegi, Gargaly, Serhetabat, Ynkylap)
  - Şöhrat (Buýanly, Bagtyýarlyk, Medeniýet)
  - Nowbahar (Rozumboý, Bäşmergen, Garamanly, Gülzar, Şyhgala, Täzeýol)
  - Sadylla Rozmetow adyndaky (Gülüstan, Ak Altyn, Altynköl, Bereket, Bossan, Çarbag, Derýalyk, Döwletli, Gaýrat, Isgender Hojaýew adyndaky, Kyýat, Nowbahar, Nowruz, Oýrat, Pagtaçy, Watan,Ýarmyş ,Ýaşlyk, Ýaňyýer, Ýyldyz, Zawod)
  - Şatlyk (Täzebazar, Çagataý, Eýwançy, Şabatly, Şöhrat, Uzynköl)
