= Akdepe =

- Location in Turkmenistan Akdepe (Asia)
- Coordinates: 42°3′N 59°24′E
- Country: Turkmenistan
- Region: Daşoguz Region
- District: Akdepe District

Population (2009)
  - Total: 15,580
- Time zone: UTC+5 (+5)

Akdepe is a city in Akdepe District in Dashoguz Province, Turkmenistan, located at latitude 42.05471 degrees north, longitude 59.37997 degrees east. Until 9 November 2022 it was the district capital.

== Etymology ==
The words ak depe mean "white hill" in Turkmen. Atanyýazow notes that there are several places in Turkmenistan with this name, and that the name generally refers to white hills in the vicinity.
