= Izmukshir =

Historical place in Turkmenistan

Coordinates: 41°43′54″N 59°43′05″E

Izmukshir (Turkmen: Yzmykşir), formerly Zamakhshar (Persian: زمخشر), is the site of a ruin in the Khwarazm oasis of Turkmenistan, about 25 km. south of Daşoguz.

== History ==
Zamakhshar was a prominent town of medieval Khwarazm. It was the birthplace of Al-Zamakhshari, a Muslim polymath.

== Site ==
The ruins of the town is enclosed by a decaying wall; the southern gate survives alongside a mud-brick tower as does a gate of the northern wall. Skeletal remains are visible across the ruins. A twin-domed mausoleum adjacent to the walls is believed to be the resting place of Al-Zamakhshari — it attracts pilgrims.
