= Boldumsaz District =

Boldumsaz District Boldumsaz etraby
- District
- Country: Turkmenistan
- Province: Daşoguz Province
- Capital: Boldumsaz

Area
  - Total: 476 sq mi (1,233 km^{2})

Population (2022 census)
  - Total: 257,496
  - Density: 540.9/sq mi (208.8/km^{2})
- Time zone: UTC+5 (+5)

Boldumsaz District is a district of Daşoguz Province, Turkmenistan. The administrative center of the district is the town of Boldumsaz.

== Administrative Subdivisions ==
- Cities (şäherler)
  - Boldumsaz
- Village councils (geňeşlikler)
  - Almalyk (Bereketli, Almalyk, Bitaraplyk, Çarwalar, Gülzar, Sähra, Söýegbagşy, Türkmenistan, Ýalkym)
  - Aşgabat (Çigoý, Bereket, Tahýadaş, Täzegüýç, Ýaldyroý, Ýüpek ýoly)
  - Garaşsyzlyk (Asudalyk, Altyn sähra, Diýar, Meleje, Otuzoba, Ruhubelent)
  - Guýanagyz (Akmanýap, Guýanagyz)
  - Guwanç Atamedow adyndaky (Göbeklioý, Birleşik, Bozajy, Söhbet)
  - Medeniýet (Altyn toprak, Altyn zaman, Kuwwat, Medeniýet, Bagçylar)
  - 10 ýyl abadanlyk (Ýagty ýol, Agzybirlik, Täze zaman, Watan, Ýaşlyk)
  - Rowaçlyk (Galdaw, Bagtyýarlyk, Kölsaka, Särarýap)
  - Zähmetkeş (Altyn asyr, Aýlakly, Bozýer, Garaýylgyn)
