= Köneürgenç District =

Köneürgenç District Köneürgenç etraby
- District
- Country: Turkmenistan
- Province: Daşoguz Province
- Capital: Köneürgenç
- Established: 1925

Köneürgenç District is a district of Daşoguz Province in Turkmenistan. The administrative center of the district is the town of Köneürgenç. It was established in 1925. It is a historical city which served as the capital of Khorezm shahs. It was also one of the Silk Road's more important points. Today there are still a number of historical monuments dating from the time of Khorezm, among which are the Palace of Törebeg Hanym, the tomb of Ilarslan, the tomb of Tekesh, the tomb of Nejmettin Kübra and Soltan Aly, the Dash Metjid, and so on. These monuments are now enlisted as UNESCO World Heritage Sites.

== Administrative Subdivisions ==
- Cities (şäherler)
  - Köneürgenç
- Towns (şäherçeler)
  - Bereket
- Village councils (geňeşlikler)
  - Abadan (Bereket, Baýnuroý, Dostluk, Ýedigara)
  - Akderýa (Akderýa, Bakyýap, Emingala, Halykberdi, Tamdyrlyboz, Täzebirleşik)
  - Akgala (Akgala, Gumly, Gyzylýer, Horezm, Hywaçyoý, Jelaleddin, Köçerýap, Uýgurýer)
  - Akýol (Zaman, Lebiýap, Paltagaçan, Täze, Eýmiroba)
  - Derýalyk (Derýalyk, Aktam, Annagara, Birinji Was, Kyrkgyzoý)
  - Ezberköl (Ezberköl, Körgala)
  - Galkynyş (Galkynyş, Goçgarköpri, Guýanagyz, Jigirdekli)
  - Hakykat (Hakykat, Hojaoý, Toklyoý, Türkmenistan)
  - Kyrkgyz (Kyrkgyz, Galpakýaran, Garaoý, Gulaçýap)
  - Maslahat (Maslahat, Buýanly, Daýhanbirleşik, Maslahatdepe, Saraýgöl)
  - Pagtaçy (Pagtaçy, Birleşik, Garatereň, Gatyakar, Künjilioý, Bagtyýarlyk)
  - Täzegüýç (Täzegüýç, Akgum, Boýraçy, Garabelemýap, Gumlygala, Wekiloý)
  - Täzeýap (Täzeýap, Akbaşly, Uşakýap)
  - Täzeýol (Täzeýol, Çilter, Gamyşlyoý, Garaşsyzlyk, Gazakýer)
  - Watan (Watan, Aktakyr, Çetilioý, Ikinji Was, Döwletli, Teňňelioý)

== See also ==
- Kunya-Urgench
