= Görogly (city) =

Görogly Tagta (?-2002)
- Location in Turkmenistan Görogly (Asia)
- Coordinates: 41°39′08″N 59°54′46″E
- Country: Turkmenistan
- Region: Daşoguz Region
- District: Görogly District
- Elevation: 86 m (282 ft)
- Time zone: UTC+5

Görogly, formerly called Tagta, is a city subordinate to a district and the administrative center of Görogly District, Daşoguz Province, Turkmenistan. It is located 20 kilometers south of the city of Daşoguz.

== Etymology ==
The name Görogly was assigned by Turkmen authorities to both the city and the district in 2002 to honor the Turkic national epos Epic of Koroghlu (Turkmen: Görogly). The municipalities were called Tagta during the Soviet period. The word tagta in various Turkic languages means "wood" but in Turkmen specifically means "board". Atanyyazow suggests that the name refers to a wooden dam and bridge built here.

== History ==
In the Soviet period it was classified as a town of urban type (Russian: посёлок городского типа). In June 2016 it was upgraded by decree of the Mejlis to city status. The same decree subordinated to the city of Görogly the village of Sazakly of the rural council named for Magtymguly, and the villages of Akderek and Polasoltan of the Türkmenýoly rural council.
