= Daşoguz Region =

Region of Turkmenistan

Coordinates: 41°0′N 58°30′E

Daşoguz Welaýaty
- Region
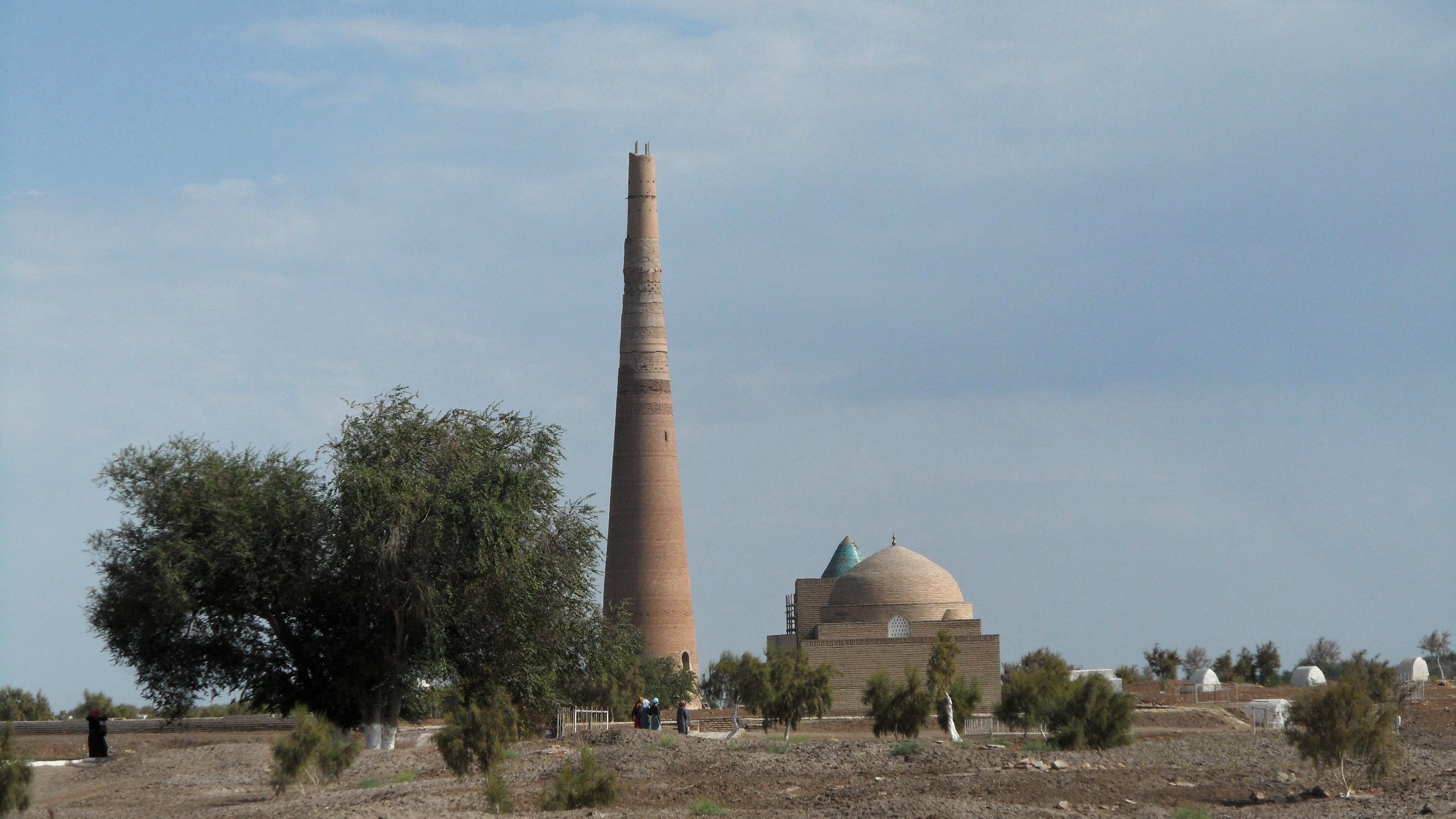
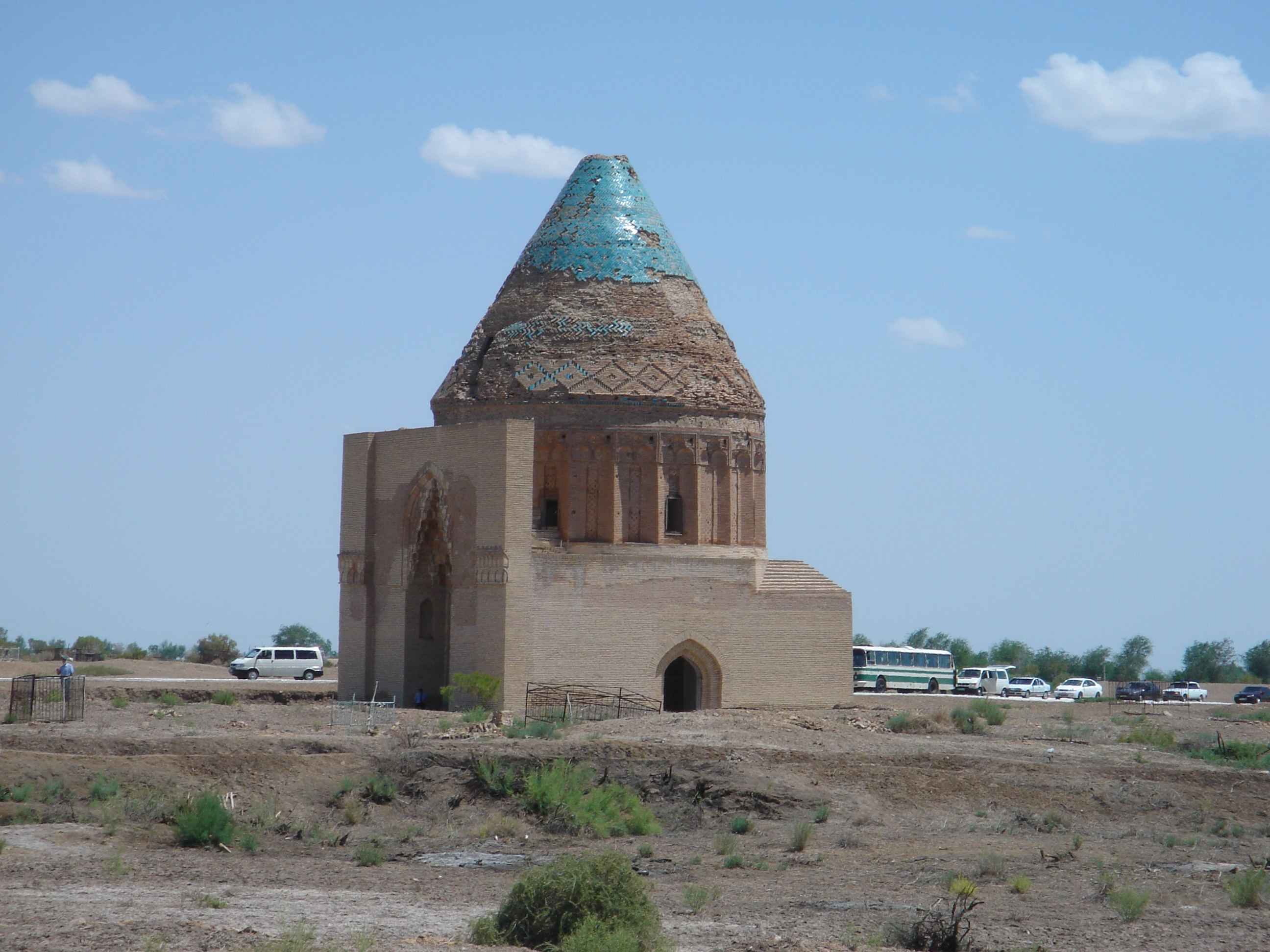
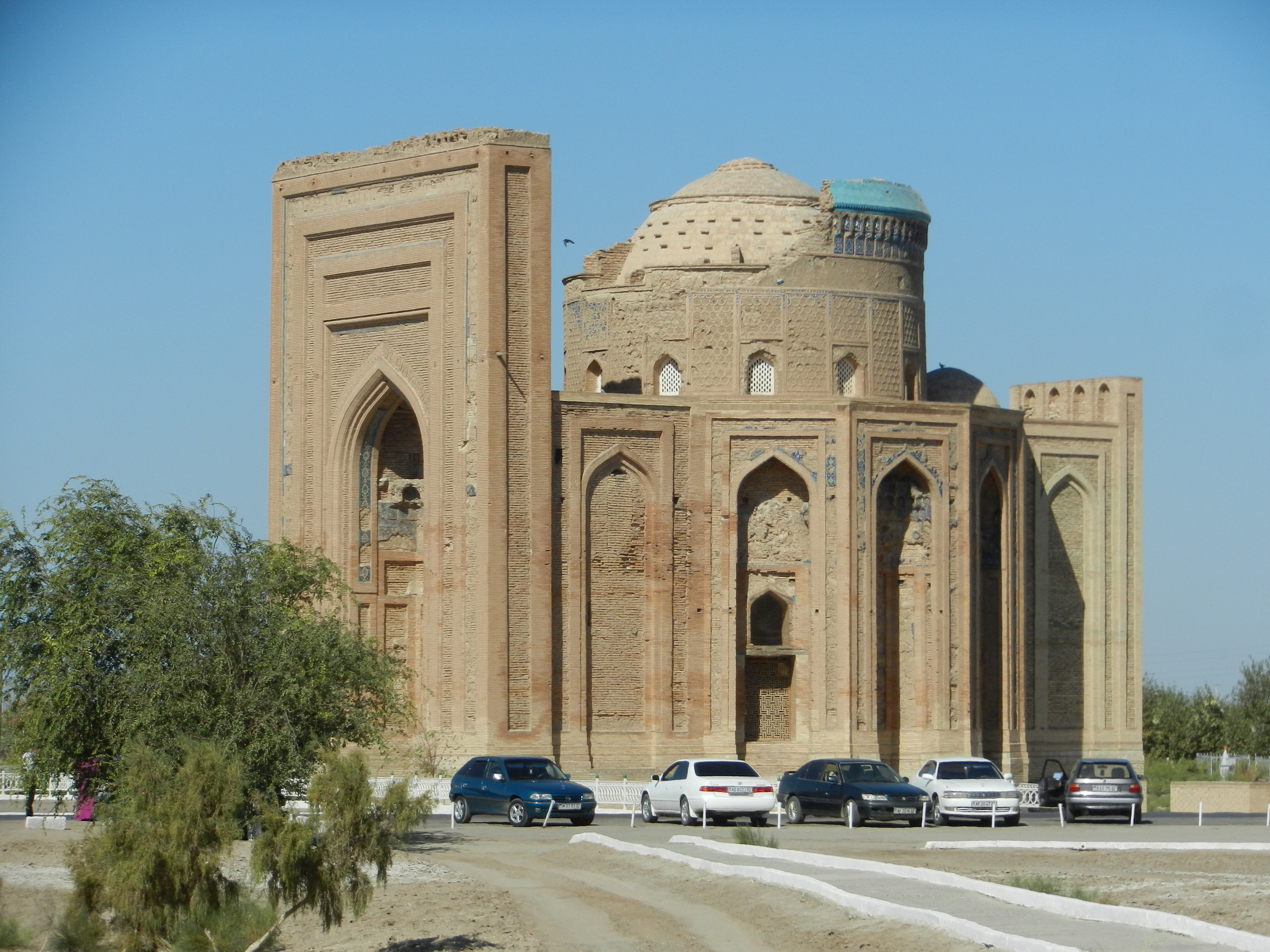
- From the top, Kutlug Timur Minaret, Tekesh Mausoleum, Turabek Khanum Mausoleum

- Daşoguz region in Turkmenistan
- Country: Turkmenistan
- Capital: Daşoguz

Area
  - Total: 73,430 km^{2} (28,350 sq mi)

Population (2022 census)
  - Total: 1,550,354
  - Density: 21.11/km^{2} (54.68/sq mi)
- Website: dashoguz.gov.tm

Daşoguz Region (Turkmen: Daşoguz welaýaty; formerly Daşhowuz) is one of the regions of Turkmenistan. It is in the north of the country, bordering Uzbekistan. The area of the province is 73,430 square kilometers, and the total population is 1,550,354 (2022 census). The capital is Daşoguz.

The region is mostly desert, and is experiencing severe environmental degradation as a result of the Aral Sea ecological catastrophe. Increased soil salinity has ruined thousands of square kilometers of farmland.

The region contains the UNESCO World Heritage Site of Köneürgenç and the archaeological site, Butentau.

== Administrative subdivisions ==
=== Districts ===
As of 9 November 2022 Dashoguz Province (Daşoguz welaýaty) is subdivided into 7 districts (etrap, plural etraplar):

1. Akdepe
2. Boldumsaz
3. Garaşsyzlyk (formerly Gurbansoltan eje adyndaky)
4. Görogly (formerly Tagta)
5. Gubadag
6. Köneurgenç
7. Ruhubelent
8. Şabat (formerly S.A. Nyýazow adyndaky)
9. Saparmyrat Türkmenbaşy

The former districts of Gubadag and of Gurbansoltan eje adyndaky were abolished in November 2022.

=== Municipalities ===
As of January 1, 2017, the province included 9 cities (şäherler), one town (şäherçe), 134 rural or village councils (geňeşlikler), and 612 villages (obalar). By parliamentary decree of 9 November 2022, the number of towns was increased to seven by upgrading some villages, and Köneurgenç's district status was revoked.

In the list below, the city with "district status" is bolded:

- Akdepe
- Andalyp (formerly Gurbansoltan Eje)
- Boldumsaz
- **Daşoguz**
- Görogly
- Gubadag
- Köneurgenç
- Şabat (formerly Nyýazow)
- Saparmyrat Türkmenbaşy adyndaky

The list below is of municipalities in Dashoguz Region with town status.

- Akjadepe şäherçesi
- Bereket şäherçesi
- Gökçäge şäherçesi
- Orazgeldi Ärsaryýew adyndaky şäherçe
- Rejepguly Ataýew adyndaky şäherçe
- Ruhubelent şäherçesi
- Sadylla Rozmetow adyndaky şäherçe

== Demographic ==
=== Table of National composition of the population of Daşoguz region (2022) ===
Table:

Ethnicity	Total		Urban		Rural	
Ethnicity	Population	%	Population	%	Population	%
Turkmens	1,046,202	67.48%	259,723	54.81%	786,479	73.06%
Uzbeks	489,453	31.57%	205,534	43.38%	283,919	26.38%
Kazakhs	5,796	0.37%	2,323	0.49%	3,473	0.32%
Russians	2,907	0.19%	2,535	0.54%	372	0.03%
Karakalpaks	2,272	0.15%	809	0.17%	1,463	0.14%
Tatars	1,456	0.09%	1,259	0.27%	197	0.02%
Koreans	646	0.04%	558	0.12%	88	0.01%
Azerbaijanis	402	0.03%	212	0.04%	190	0.02%
Balochi	174	0.01%	160	0.03%	14	0.00%
Armenians	112	0.01%	104	0.02%	8	0.00%
Ukrainians	98	0.01%	73	0.02%	25	0.00%
Kurds	57	0.00%	49	0.01%	8	0.00%
Persians	47	0.00%	21	0.00%	26	0.00%
Lezgins	24	0.00%	18	0.00%	6	0.00%
Afghans	8	0.00%	2	0.00%	6	0.00%
other nationalities	700	0.05%	481	0.10%	219	0.02%
Total	1,549,469	100%	482,088	100%	1,067,381	100%

== Economy ==
=== Agriculture ===
Daşoguz Province: area and production of selected crops, 2017-2019
	area, thousand hectares			production, thousand tonnes		
	2017	2018	2019	2017	2018	2019
Cereals and legumes	189.5	167.1	167.6	333.3	279.5	359.7
Cotton	140.7	141.3	141.1	231.9	230.2	244.5
Vegetables	7.4	7.2	7.8	197.1	198.3	199.9

=== Industry ===
Daşoguz Province: Production of selected industrial goods and processed foods, 2017-2019
	2017	2018	2019
Electricity, million kwh	1,592.4	1,480.4	1,481.6
Bricks, million	79.5	81.9	87.2
Cotton lint, thousand tonnes	67.7	53.5	62.1
Cotton yarn, thousand tonnes	13.0	11.2	12.3
Unrefined vegetable oil, thousand tonnes	16.2	14.9	12.8
Flour, thousand tonnes	138.1	135.8	140.4

== See also ==
- OpenStreetMap Wiki: Dashoguz Province
- Map of Districts (Etraplar) of Dashoguz Province
