= Garateňir =

Garateňir Garateňir obasy
- Village
- Location in Turkmenistan
- Coordinates: 40°01′18″N 53°30′24″E
- Country: Turkmenistan
- Province: Balkan Province
- District: Türkmenbaşy District
- Town: Belek

Population (2022 official census)
  - Total: 114
- Time zone: UTC+5

Garateňir is a village in Türkmenbaşy District, Balkan Province, Turkmenistan. The village is centered around its railway station, which is located between Ýaňyajy and 126-njy duralga, between Türkmenbaşy and Belek. It is subordinate to the town of Belek. In 2022, Garateňir had a population of 114 people.

== Subordination ==
Garateňir is subordinate to Belek along with two other villages:

Belek, town:

- 126-njy duralga, village
- 129-njy duralga, village
- Garateňir, village

== See also ==
- List of municipalities in Balkan Province
