= Garaşsyzlyk, Türkmenbaşy District =

Garaşsyzlyk Garaşsyzlyk obasy
- Village
- Location in Turkmenistan
- Coordinates: 40°04′13″N 53°04′48″E
- Country: Turkmenistan
- Province: Balkan Province
- District: Türkmenbaşy District
- Town: Akdaş

Population (2022 official census)
  - Total: 211
- Time zone: UTC+5

Garaşsyzlyk, previously known as the 2nd Security Checkpoint (in Russian: Блок-пост 2-й) then just Blok-post in Turkmen, is a village located in Balkan Province, Turkmenistan. Several toponyms use the same name in Turkmenistan. The village is subordinate to the town of Akdaş and is its sole rural dependency. As of 2022, its population reached 211 people.

== Etymology ==
The Turkmen language is a very agglutinative language which, along with other Turkic languages, uses a lot of suffixes. Thus, the name Garaşsyzlyk is a succession of a word and two suffixes. "Garaş" could be translated as "Relation," "-syz" is a suffix meaning "Without" or "No," "With no relation," and the suffix "-lyk" could be translated as the suffix "-ness." Consequently, the whole word "Garaşsyzlyk" translates as "Independence."

== Location ==
The town is located in the District of Türkmenbaşy, Balkan Province, along a road northwest of Akdaş and Türkmenbaşy and northeast of the city of Türkmenbaşy.

== See also ==
- List of municipalities in Balkan Province
