= Türkmendeñizýollary =

Shipping company in Turkmenistan

Closed Joint-stock company Deňiz söwda floty
- Industry: Shipping, Rail Transport / Passenger
- Founded: 2010
- Headquarters: Türkmenbaşy, Türkmenistan
- Area served: Caspian Sea, Black Sea, Mediterranean Sea, Marmara Sea
- Parent: Türkmendeňizderýaýollary Agency
- Website: mmf.com.tm

Deňiz söwda floty Closed Joint-Stock Company is a Turkmenistani shipping company. It is also known as "Marine Merchant Fleet" CJSC (from the ЗАО "Морской торговый флот"). The company operates Turkmenbashi International Seaport. The company belongs to the Türkmendeňizderýaýollary Agency.

CJSC "Deňiz söwda floty" has direct maritime connections only with other Caspian littoral states (Iran, Kazakhstan, Russia, and Azerbaijan). However, the Volga–Don Canal provides maritime access to the high seas. One of the main areas of activity is the transportation of oil and petroleum products abroad using our own ships, and the performance of international flights with cargo, cars and passengers.

== History ==
The Authority of the Turkmen Marine Fleet was created in 2010.

27 March 2015, the Authority was transformed into the Closed Joint Stock Company "Deňiz söwda floty".

In 2019, the CJSC "Deňiz söwda floty" was awarded the status of "National Sea Carrier".

== Shareholders ==
The shareholders of the Deňiz söwda floty are the Türkmendeňizderýaýollary (70% of the shares), the Turkmenbashi International Seaport (20%), Derýaýollary (9%), and the Altyn Asyr mobile operator (1%).

== Fleet ==
The merchant fleet of the company consists of 21 vessels. They are designed for sea transportation of oil and petroleum products, cargo transportation, vehicle transportation, passenger transportation, and various types of dry cargo transportation. The main base of the fleet is located in the Turkmenbashi International Seaport, which is the largest on the Caspian Sea.

CJSC "Deňiz söwda floty" fleet
Image	Name	Type	Acquired	Manufacturer country	Notes
	Saparmyrat Nyýazow	Bulk carrier	1992	Czechoslovakia	
	Turkmenistan	Bulk carrier	1992	Czechoslovakia	
	Balkan	Bulk carrier	1993	Czechoslovakia	
	Magtymguly	Bulk carrier	1993	Czechoslovakia	
	Serpaý	Tracker	1987	USA	BUREAU VERITAS 22489W
	Gahryman Atamyrat Nyýazow	Tanker	2001	Turkey	IMO 9236298
	Hazar	Tanker	2009	Russia	IMO 9435399
	Sumbar	Tanker	2009	Russia	IMO 9435387
	Jeýhun	Tanker	2010	Russia	IMO 9592202
	Bitarap	Tanker	2010	Estonia	IMO 9430208
	Etrek	Tanker	2012	Russia	IMO 8657454
	Alaja	Tanker	2013	Russia	IMO 9702663
	Kenar	Tanker	2013	Russia	IMO 9702675
	Çarlak	Passenger ship	2013	Turkmenistan	
	Berkarar	Ferry	2014	Croatia	IMO 9684330
	Bagtyýar	Ferry	2015	Croatia	IMO 9684342
	Rowaç	High speed passenger ship	2019	Russia	IMO 9839612
	Rahat	High speed passenger ship	2020	Russia	IMO 9839600
	Gadamly	Dry bulk	2025	Turkmenistan	IMO 1061154
	Dostluk	Tanker	2026	Azerbaijan	IMO 1037361

== See also ==
- Transport in Turkmenistan
- Turkmen Riverways

== Links ==
- Official web-site
