= Akdaş =

Akdaş Akdaş şäherçesi
- Town
- Location in Turkmenistan
- Coordinates: 40°02′29″N 53°07′21″E
- Country: Turkmenistan
- Region: Balkan Region
- District: Türkmenbaşy District

Population (2022 official census)
  - Town: 6,961
  - Urban: 6,750
  - Rural: 211
- Time zone: UTC+5

Akdaş, previously known as the 2nd Stone Quarry (in Russian: "Каменный Карьер 2-й"), is a town located in Balkan Region, Turkmenistan. In 2022, it had a population of 6,750 people.

== Etymology ==
In Turkmen, Akdaş is a compound of the words "Ak" and "Daş", meaning "White" and "Stone" respectively. This name might be a reference to the working past of the settlement.

== Location ==
The town is located within the District of Türkmenbaşy, Balkan Region, on a plateau northeast of both the city and town of Türkmenbaşy, formerly named Krasnovodsk and Jaňňa, overlooking the gulf of the same name. It lies southeast of Garaşsyzlyk, its only dependent rural village.

== History ==
The town was built upon several former working settlements based around a stone quarry during the soviet era.

== Dependencies ==
Akdaş as a town has only a single dependent rural village:

Akdaş, town:

- Garaşsyzlyk, village.
