= Hasan, Turkmenistan =

Village in Turkmenistan

Hasan Hasan obasy
- Village
- Location in Turkmenistan
- Coordinates: 40°10′54″N 53°32′01″E
- Country: Turkmenistan
- Province: Balkan Province
- District: Türkmenbaşy District
- Town: Türkmenbaşy şäherçesi

Population (2022 official census)
  - Total: 508
- Time zone: UTC+5

Hasan, previously known as Kasan (in Russian: Касан), is a village in Türkmenbaşy District, Balkan Province, Turkmenistan. The village is subordinate to the town of Türkmenbaşy. In 2022, it had a population of 508 people.

== Subordination ==
Hasan is one of three subordinated to the town of Türkmenbaşy. The other two villages are Sülmen, and Ýaňyajy.

== See also ==
- List of municipalities in Balkan Province
