= List of lighthouses in Turkmenistan =

This is a list of lighthouses in Turkmenistan faced on the Caspian Sea.

== Lighthouses ==
Name	Image	Year built	Location & coordinates	Class of Light	Tower height	ARLHS number
Awaza East Breakwater Lighthouse	Image	~2010	Awaza; 39°57′04.7″N 52°50′57.4″E	n/a	8 metres (26 ft)	TKM-006
Awaza West Breakwater Lighthouse	Image	~2010	Awaza; 39°57′03.9″N 52°50′54.6″E	n/a	8 metres (26 ft)	TKM-007
Cheleken Lighthouse	Image	1965	Cheleken; 39°26′08.2″N 53°06′04.0″E	F W	40 metres (130 ft)	TKM-003
Dervish Ýarymada Lighthouse		n/a	Cheleken Peninsula; 39°16′17.3″N 53°10′19.5″E	none	10 metres (33 ft)	TKM-002
Guwlymayak Lighthouse	Image	1953	Guwlymayak; 40°14′43.5″N 52°44′00.3″E	n/a	40 metres (130 ft)	TMK-009
Hazar North Breakwater Lighthouse	Image	n/a	Hazar; 39°24′22.7″N 53°06′07.9″E	green light	10 metres (33 ft)	n/a
Hazar South Breakwater Lighthouse		n/a	Hazar; 39°24′27.0″N 53°05′56.2″E	red light	10 metres (33 ft)	n/a
Kara-Ada Lighthouse	Image	1955	Garabogaz; 41°31′16.6″N 52°32′37.8″E	Fl (2) W 12s.	29 metres (95 ft)	TKM-010
Ogurja Ada Lighthouse		1963	Ogurja Ada; 38°49′15.7″N 53°03′27.4″E	n/a	31 metres (102 ft)	TKM-001
Tarta Lighthouse	Image	1963	Awaza; 40°00′24.0″N 52°46′12.2″E	inactive	~ 17 metres (56 ft)	TKM-011
Türkmenbaşy Lighthouse	Image	1956	Türkmenbaşy; 39°45′58.1″N 53°02′06.5″E	n/a	29 metres (95 ft)	TMK-004
Türkmenbaşy Range Rear Lighthouse	Image	n/a	Türkmenbaşy; 40°00′53.8″N 52°59′22.4″E	n/a	30 metres (98 ft)	TMK-005

== See also ==
- Lists of lighthouses and lightvessels
