= Belek, Turkmenistan =

Belek Belek şäherçesi
- Town
- Location in Turkmenistan
- Coordinates: 39°56′18″N 53°50′52″E
- Country: Turkmenistan
- Province: Balkan Province
- District: Türkmenbaşy District

Population (2022 official census)
  - Town: 2,031
  - Urban: 1,720
  - Rural: 311
- Time zone: UTC+05:00 (TMT)

Belek, formerly known as Belek-Turkmenskiy (in Russian:"Белек-Туркменский"), is a town in Türkmenbaşy District, Balkan Province, Turkmenistan. It is located nearly halfway between Türkmenbaşy and Balkanabat. In 2022, Belek had a population of 1,720 people.

== Infrastructure ==
Belek is the west end of the East–West pipeline, starting in Şatlyk, Mary Province.

In 2012, new social and economic infrastructures were unveiled in town. Among them were a cultural center with a capacity of 200 people, a school with a capacity of 320 children, and a compressor station.

== Dependencies ==
As a town, Belek has three dependent rural villages:

Belek, town:

- 126-njy duralga, village.
- 129-njy duralga, village.
- Garateňir, village.
