= Garaşsyzlyk (disambiguation) =

Garaşsyzlyk is a Turkmen word for "Independence". It may refer to:

== Places ==
=== Territorial entities ===
- Garaşsyzlyk, a town in Dänew District, Lebap Province
- Garaşsyzlyk District, a district in Daşoguz Province

==== Rural councils ====
- Garaşsyzlyk, Boldumsaz District, a rural council in Boldumsaz District, Daşoguz Province, centered around Asudalyk village
- Garaşsyzlyk, Tejen District, a rural council in Tejen District, Ahal Province, centered around the village of the same name

==== Villages ====
- Garaşsyzlyk, Akdepe District, a village in Akdepe District, Daşoguz Province
- Garaşsyzlyk, Dänew District, a village in Dänew District, Lebap Province
- Garaşsyzlyk, Köýtendag District, a village in Köýtendag District, Lebap Province
- Garaşsyzlyk, Köneürgenç District, a village in Köneürgenç District, Daşoguz Province
- Garaşsyzlyk, Murgap District, a village in Murgap District, Mary Province
- Garaşsyzlyk, Tejen District, a village in Tejen District, Ahal Province
- Garaşsyzlyk, Türkmenbaşy District, a village in Türkmenbaşy District, Balkan Province

=== Other ===
- Independence Monument (Turkmenistan) (Garaşsyzlyk binasy), a monument in Aşgabat
- Independence Square, Ashgabat (Garaşsyzlyk meýdany), a square in Aşgabat
- Garaşsyzlyk Stadium, a stadium in Daşoguz Province

== Other ==
- Garaşsyzlyk, the name for October during the renaming of Turkmen months and days of week
- Independence Day (Turkmenistan), called "Garaşsyzlyk baýramy" in Turkmen
- Turkmen Independence Day Parade, called "Türkmenistanyň Garaşsyzlyk baýramy harby parad" in Turkmen
