= State Service of Maritime and River Transportation of Turkmenistan =

Turkmen state agency

Turkmendenizderyayollary Agency (Turkmen Sea and River Routes)
- «Türkmendeňizderýaýollary» agentligi

Agency overview
- Formed: August 5, 1992; 34 years ago
- Headquarters: 745000, Turkmenistan Turkmenbashi, Shagadam street 8A
- Parent agency: Ministry of Industry and Communication of Turkmenistan
- Website: tmrl.gov.tm/en/

Turkmendenizderyayollary Agency (Turkmen: «Türkmendeňizderýaýollary» agentligi/«Түркмендеңиздеряёллары» агентлиги) is a state agency in Turkmenistan that owns several state companies. It is under the jurisdiction of the Ministry of Industry and Communication of Turkmenistan. The main office is located in the city of Turkmenbashi. It is entrusted to manage state property, maintain transport security-related tasks and provide services in the field of maritime and inland waterway transport.

== History ==
Agency Turkmendenizderyayollary (Turkmen: «Türkmendeňizderýaýollary» agentligi) was established on August 5, 1992.

In April 2003, an Directorate of sea and river transport Turkmendenizderyayollary (Turkmen: «Türkmendeňizderýaýollary» müdirligi) was established by merging the river and maritime departments of Turkmenistan.

On July 10, 2010, the Directorate of sea and river transport Turkmendenizderyayollary (Turkmen: «Türkmendenizderýaýollary» müdirligi) was transformed into the State Service of Maritime and River Transportation of Turkmenistan (Turkmen: Türkmenistanyň deňiz we derýa ulaglary Döwlet gullugy).

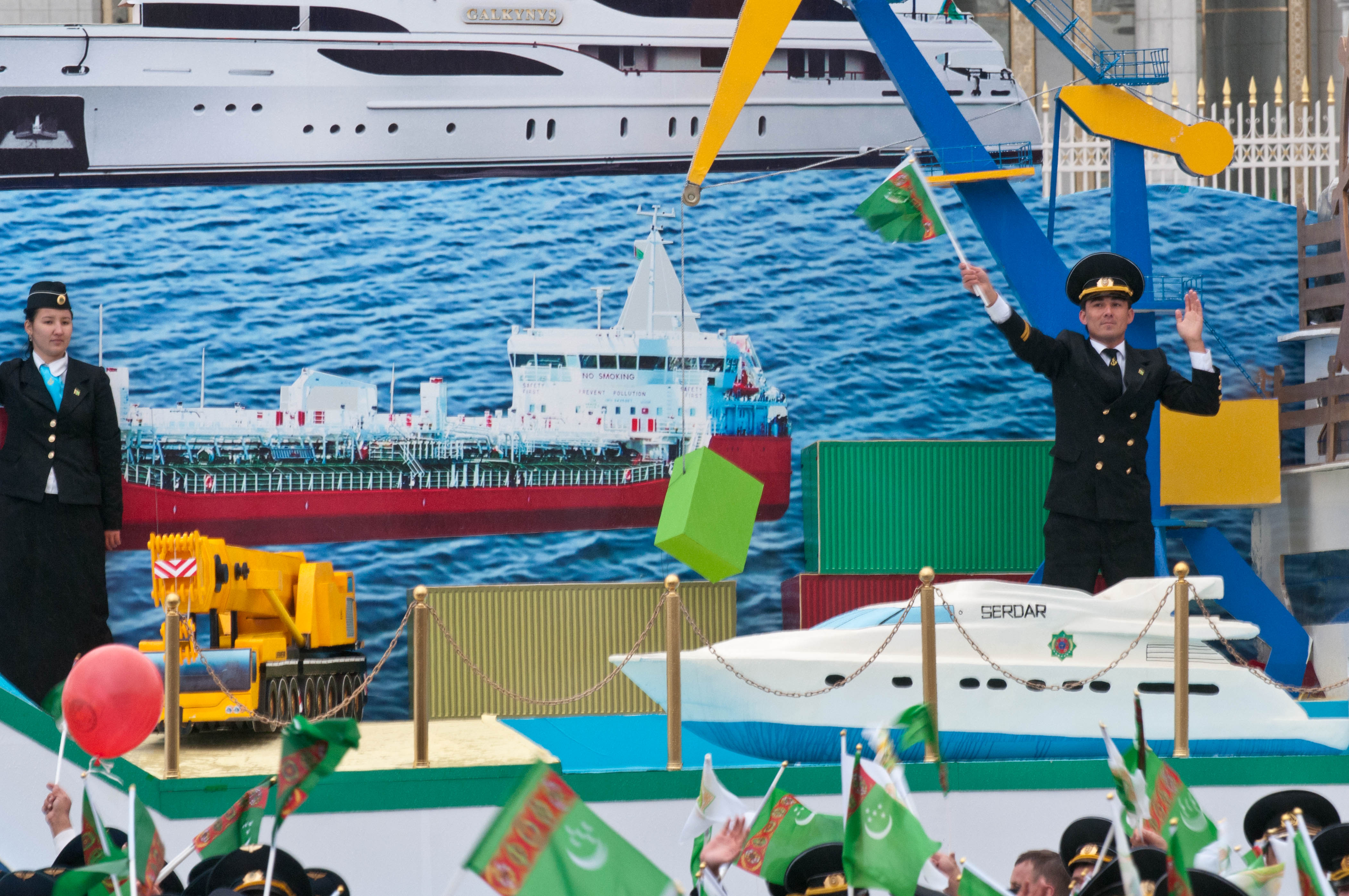
Workers of Agency Celebrating the Independence in Turkmenistan

On January 29, 2019, the Ministry of Industry and Communication was established in Turkmenistan. State Service of Maritime and River Transportation of Turkmenistan became part of the ministry as an agency with name Turkmendenizderyayollary (Turkmen: «Türkmendeňizderýaýollary» agentligi).

== Overview ==
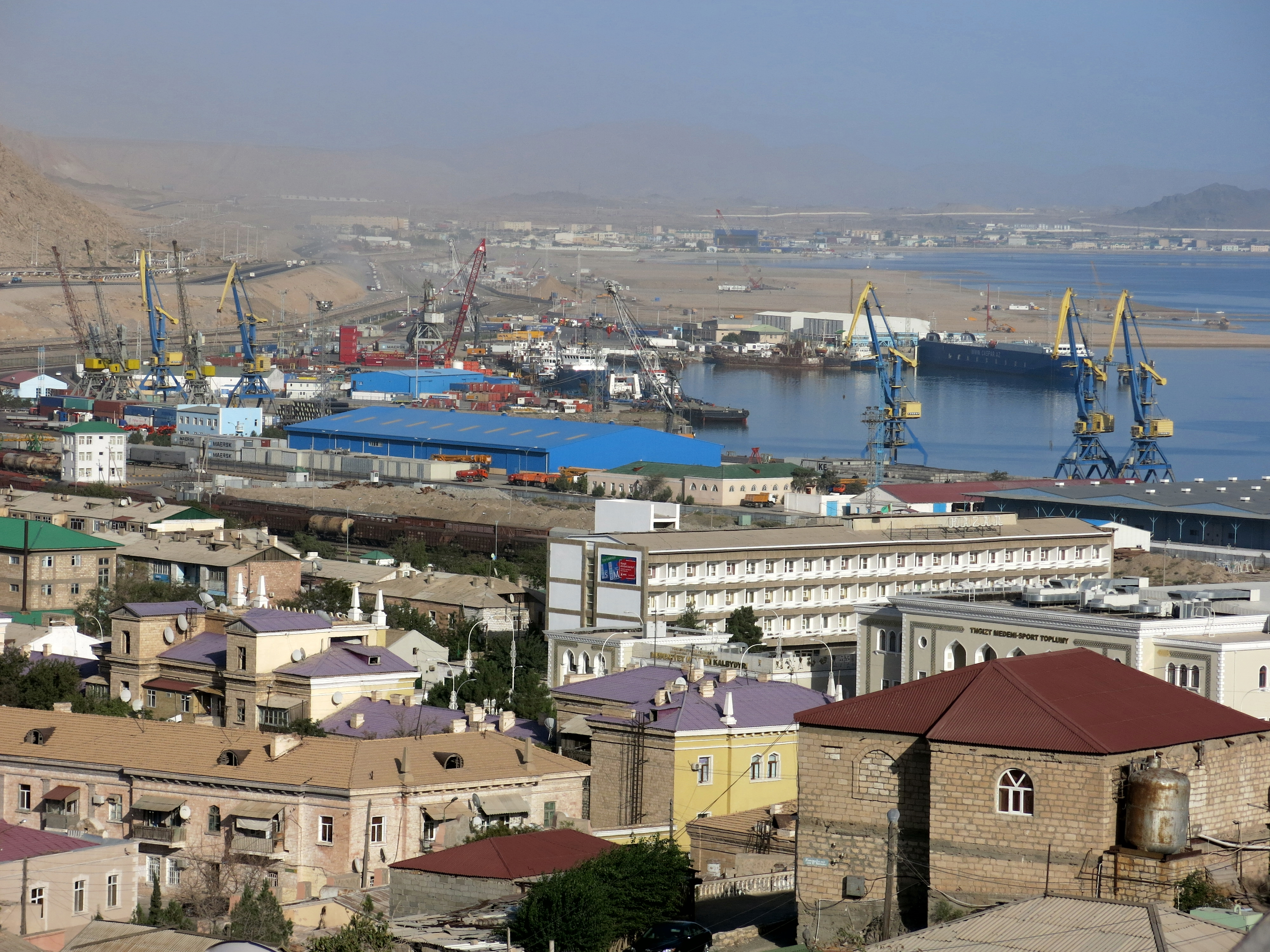
Turkmenbashi International Seaport

The structure of the agency includes:

- Turkmenbashi International Seaport
- River secondary school in the city of Turkmenabat
- Turkmenbashi Marine Secondary Vocational School
- Charlak Hotel
- OJSC "Balkan" gämi gurluşyk we abatlaýyş zawody"
- CJSC "Deňiz söwda floty" is a Turkmenistani shipping company.
- OJSC Deryayollary is a state-owned operator of river-ways and river-ports and operates 1,013 km (629 mi) of river-ways on Amu Darya and Karakum Canal. Owns Turkmenabat River Port.

== International cooperation ==
Since 1993 Turkmenistan has been a member of the International Maritime Organization, which is responsible for enhancing the reliability and safety of navigation in international trade and for preventing marine pollution from ships.

The agency cooperates with the European Maritime Safety Agency, the Russian Maritime Register of Shipping and Bureau Veritas.

== See also ==
- Transport in Turkmenistan
- Ministry of the Maritime Fleet (Soviet Union)
- Federal Agency for Maritime and River Transportation (Russia)

== Links ==
- Official website - news
