= Krasnovodsk Peninsula =

Türkmenbaşy Peninsula Türkmenbaşy Ýarymada Krasnovodsk Peninsula
- Peninsula
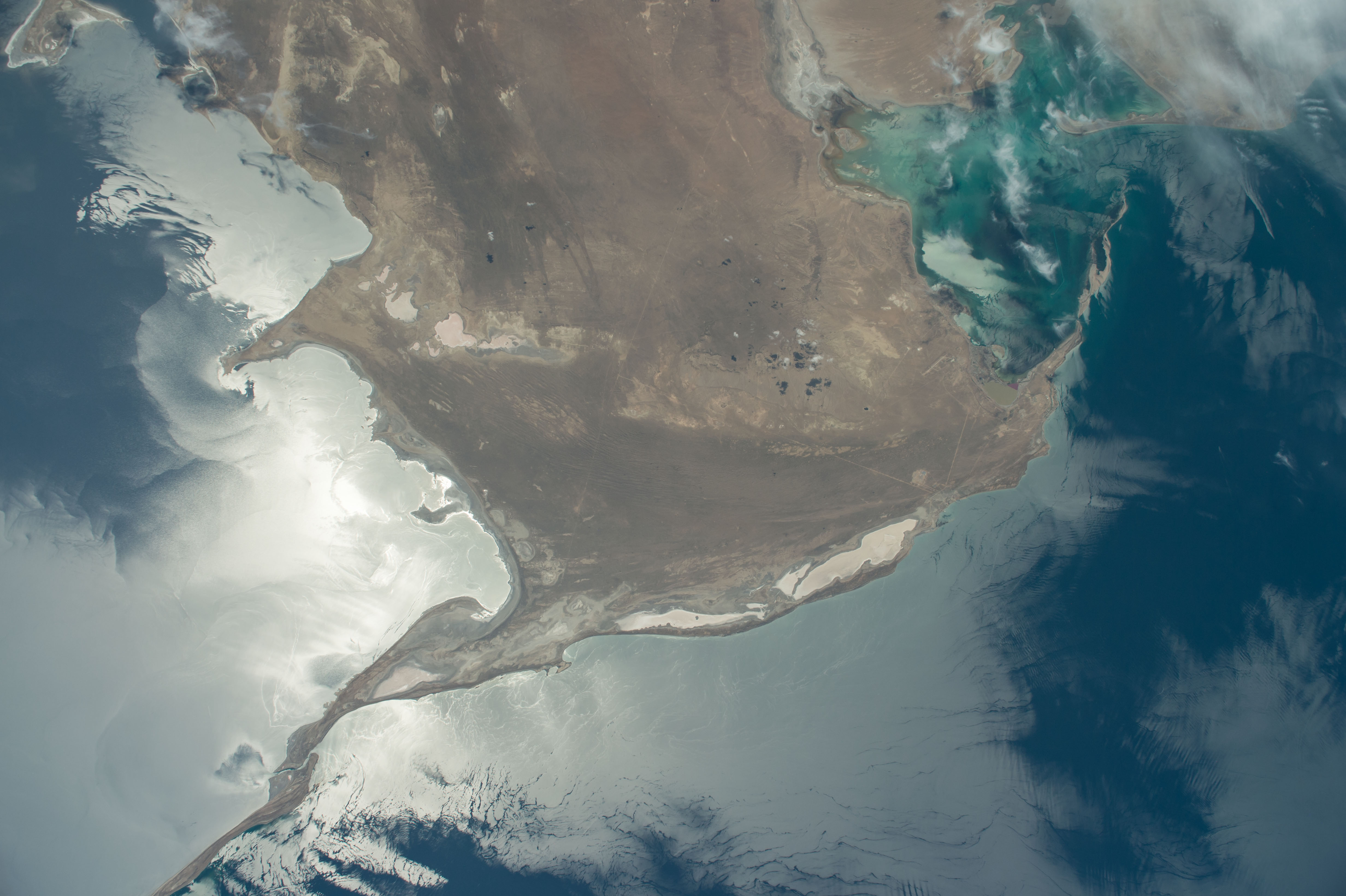
- Image of Turkmenistan taken from the International Space Station

- Location within Caspian Sea
- Coordinates: 40°20′N 53°10′E
- Country: Turkmenistan
- Region: Balkan Region
- Sea: Caspian Sea

The Türkmenbaşy Peninsula or Türkmenbaşy Ýarymada, formerly known as the Krasnovodsk Peninsula (Russian: Красноводский полуостров), is a large peninsula located in western Turkmenistan.

== Geography ==
It borders on the Caspian Sea in the west, the Garabogazköl in the north, and the Türkmenbaşy Gulf in the south.

The peninsula is between desert and semidesert, with the Chilmamedkum Desert in the east and the Oktukum Desert in the west. The Türkmenbaşy Ýarymada has a continental dry climate with a precipitation of 100 mm (3.9 in) per year. The Peninsula is practically covered by the Türkmenbaşy Plateau. The city of Türkmenbaşy is located to the south on the shores of the Türkmenbaşy Bay. Administratively, the peninsula is in Turkmenistan's Balkan Region.

The peninsula was previously known as the Krasnovodsk Peninsula, but it changed its name when the city at its shores changed its name from Krasnovodsk to Türkmenbaşy.
