= 129-njy duralga =

129-njy duralga 129-njy duralga obasy
- Village
- Location in Turkmenistan
- Coordinates: 40°01′02″N 53°39′53″E
- Country: Turkmenistan
- Province: Balkan Province
- District: Türkmenbaşy District
- Town: Belek

Population (2022 official census)
  - Total: 104
- Time zone: UTC+5

129-njy duralga, literally the "129th stop," is a village and railway station in Türkmenbaşy District, Balkan Province, Turkmenistan. It is subordinate to the town of Belek. In 2022, it had a population of 104 people.

== History ==
Previously named "Raz'eldnaya n°129" in Russian ("Разъелдная № 129"), it changed to "129-njy demir ýol duralgasy" in Turkmen after independence. The current name was set by decree of the parliament on May 10, 2010.

== Subordination ==
129-njy duralga is subordinate to Belek along with two other villages:

Belek, town:

- 126-njy duralga, village
- 129-njy duralga, village
- Garateňir, village

== See also ==
- List of municipalities in Balkan Province
