= Derýaýollary =

Turkmen state-owned operator of waterways and river-ports

Open joint-stock company Deryayollary («Derýaýollary» açyk görnüşli paýdarlar jemgyýeti)
- Type: Public
- Industry: Shipping
- Founded: 1992
- Headquarters: Görelde st. 129A, Turkmenabat, Lebap Region, Turkmenistan
- Area served: Lebap Region
- Products: Ferries, port services, passenger transportation, freight transportation, holidays, business travel
- Website: deryayollary.com.tm/

Open joint-stock company Deryayollary (Turkmen: «Derýaýollary» açyk görnüşli paýdarlar jemgyýeti; means Riverways) is a state-owned operator of waterways and river-ports in Turkmenistan. The company operates 1,013 km (629 mi) of river-ways on Amu Darya and Karakum Canal (63rd in the world). The company belongs to the Turkmendenizderyayollary Agency. Operator based in Turkmenabat.

== Company history ==
The official beginning of the organized navigation on the Amu Darya is 1873. In 1890, based on the Amu Darya military dam. In 1917 there were on the Amu Darya 20 and 50 self-propelled vessels and about 1500 boats. In 1923 was created the Central Asian Turkmenabat Shipping. Shipping Company provided services to Turkmenistan, Uzbekistan, Tajikistan and 10 regions of Kazakhstan, and transported by water loads on 1.5 thousand kilometers. August 15, 1992 Turkmen River Shipping company was established. In 2003, it was renamed into State Company Türkmenderýaýollary (Turkmen Riverways).

In 1992, by the Decree of the President of Turkmenistan, the Türkmenderýa Parahodçylygy was established.

In 1998, it was renamed the Türkmenderýaýollary.

In 2003, it was renamed into Derýaýollary under the auspices of the Türkmendeňizderýaýollary.

In March 2021, the Derýaýollary Production Association under the Türkmendeňizderýaýollary Agency was transformed into an open joint stock company. The corresponding Resolution was signed by the highly esteemed President Gurbanguly Berdimuhamedov. Türkmendeňizderýaýollary Agency and Turkmenbashi International Seaport become founders of Derýaýollary OJSC with shares in the authorized capital of 10% and 50%, respectively.

== Overview ==
The main tasks of the Derýaýollary are: transportation of goods and passengers on the Amu Darya river transport, maintenance of navigable waterways, marinas and organization of port stations, loading and unloading operations, shipbuilding and ship repair, construction, manufacturing and construction materials, in particular - brick, production and marketing of river sand, as well as training for work on river transport.

Derýaýollary within the territory of Turkmenistan serves the navigable part of the Amu Darya length of 813 kilometers, and the Karakum Canal length of 200 kilometers. Combining a universal and specialized vessels capable of carrying a variety of cargo and passengers.

The company has at its disposal about 40 units of equipment and they provide transport services.

Вerýaýollary is engaged in the transportation of national economic goods in the directions Turkmenabat-Kerki, Zakhmet-Zeit and back, towing dredgers.

== Tourism ==
For tourists, the pleasure boat Watan has been operating since May 2021. He carries out excursions along the Amu Darya.

== See also ==
- Turkmenbashi International Seaport
- Turkmen Seaways
- Transport in Turkmenistan
