= Ýaňyajy =

Ýaňyajy Ýaňyajy obasy
- Village
- Location in Turkmenistan
- Coordinates: 40°01′08″N 53°19′39″E
- Country: Turkmenistan
- Province: Balkan Province
- District: Türkmenbaşy District
- Town: Türkmenbaşy şäherçesi

Population (2022 official census)
  - Total: 970
- Time zone: UTC+5

Ýaňyajy, formerly known as Ýaşyl baýdak or Yangadzha (Russian: Янгаджа), is a village in Türkmenbaşy District, Balkan Province, Turkmenistan. The village is subordinate to the town of Türkmenbaşy. In 2022, it had a population of 970 people.

Served by a train station and an airfield, the village is highly militarized.

== Etymology ==
In Turkmen, Ýaňyajy is a compound of two words: "Ýaňy" and "Ajy," which roughly translate to "New" or "Recent" and "Bitter" respectively. The name most likely refers to a nearby well drawing salty water.

The previous name, Ýaşyl baýdak, translates as "Green flag."

== Subordination ==
Ýaňyajy is subordinated to the town of Türkmenbaşy along with two other villages (Hasan, and Sülmen).

== See also ==
- List of municipalities in Balkan Province
