= List of countries by waterways length =

This is a list of countries by total waterways length (km) mostly based on The World Factbook accessed in May 2009.

Rank	Country	Waterways	Date of information
—	World	2,293,412	2017
1	Russia	317,505	2017
2	Brazil	153,348	2017
3	China	27,700	2017
—	European Union	53,384	2017
4	United States	40,230	2017
5	Indonesia	21,579	2008
6	India	20,275	2016
7	Colombia	18,000	2008
8	Vietnam	17,702	2008
9	Democratic Republic of the Congo	15,000	2008
10	Myanmar	12,800	2008
11	Argentina	11,000	2012
12	Papua New Guinea	11,000	2006
13	Bolivia	10,000	2007
14	Peru	8,808	2008
15	Nigeria	8,600	2008
16	France	8,501	2008
17	Bangladesh	8,370	2007
18	Finland	8,000	2013
19	Germany	7,467	2008
20	Venezuela	7,200	2008
21	Netherlands	7,100	2008
22	Malaysia	6,215	2007
23	Laos	5,279	2008
24	Iraq	4,600	2008
25	Sudan	4,068	2008
26	Thailand	4,000	2008
27	Kazakhstan	4,000	2008
28	Poland	3,997	2007
29	Egypt	3,760	2008
30	Slovenia	900	2007
31	Philippines	3,219	2008
32	United Kingdom	3,200	2008
33	Paraguay	3,100	2008
34	Mexico	2,900	2008
35	Central African Republic	2,800	2007
36	Belarus	2,500	2003
37	Cambodia	2,400	2008
38	Italy	2,400	2008
39	North Korea	2,250	2008
40	Zambia	2,250	2008
41	Nicaragua	2,220	2008
42	Ukraine	2,176	2007
43	Sweden	2,052	2007
44	Belgium	2,043	2012
45	Australia	2,000	2006
46	Mali	1,800	2008
47	Japan	1,770	2007
48	Romania	1,731	2006
49	Hungary	1,622	2008
50	South Korea	1,608	2008
51	Gabon	1,600	2008
52	Uruguay	1,600	2008
53	Norway	1,577	2008
54	Ecuador	1,500	2008
55	Angola	1,300	2008
56	Uzbekistan	1,300	2008
57	Guinea	1,300	2008
58	Ghana	1,293	2008
59	Afghanistan	1,200	2008
60	Turkey	1,200	2008
61	Suriname	1,200	2008
62	Republic of the Congo	1,120	2008
63	Turkmenistan	1,100	2014
64	Senegal	1,000	2008
65	Spain	1,000	2008
66	Guatemala	990	2007
67	Côte d'Ivoire	980	2008
68	Ireland	956	2008
69	Syria	900	2008
70	Iran	850	2008
71	Belize	825	2008
72	Panama	800	2008
73	Sierra Leone	800	2007
74	Costa Rica	785	2008
75	Croatia	730	2008
76	Malawi	700	2008
77	Canada	664	2008
78	Czech Republic	636	2008
79	Madagascar	600	2008
80	Kyrgyzstan	600	2008
81	Mongolia	587	2008
82	Serbia	580	2007
83	Bulgaria	470	2008
84	Mozambique	465	2008
85	Lithuania	460	2008
86	Honduras	441	2007
87	Moldova	424	2008
88	Denmark	400	2008
89	Gambia	390	2008
90	Austria	358	2007
91	Guyana	330	2008
92	Estonia	320	2008
93	Latvia	300	2007
94	Niger	300	2008
95	Cuba	240	2008
96	Portugal	210	2008
97	Brunei	209	2008
98	Fiji	203	2008
99	Tajikistan	200	2008
100	Slovakia	172	2008
101	Sri Lanka	160	2008
102	Benin	150	2007
103	Switzerland	65	2008
104	Togo	50	2008
105	Albania	43	2008
106	Luxembourg	37	2008
107	Liechtenstein	28	2008
108	Greece	6	2008
109	Kiribati	5	2007
