= Guwlymaýak =

Settlement in the Balkan Region of Turkmenistan

Guwlymaýak Guwlymaýak şäherçesi
- Town
- Location in Turkmenistan
- Coordinates: 40°14′46″N 52°44′19″E
- Country: Turkmenistan
- Province: Balkan Province
- District: Türkmenbaşy District

Population (2022 official census)
  - Total: 1,853
- Time zone: UTC+5

Guwlymaýak, formerly known as Kuuli-Mayak (in Russian: "Куули-Маяк"), is a town in Türkmenbaşy District, Balkan Province of Turkmenistan bordering the Caspian Sea. There is a lighthouse.

== History ==
The settlement was founded c. 1931 by a group of Kazakhs, who fled their republic during the contemporaneous famine.

== Economy ==
The local economy was originally dependent on salt which is mined from an adjacent lake. "Guwlyduz”, the salt-processing unit — formerly, the Kuuli-sol complex — is the oldest chemical plant in Turkmenistan; it remains the major supplier for not only edible salt but also industrial salt. Post upgradations in 2019, Guwlyduz had an annual production capacity of 40 kilotonnes of iodised salt. Nowadays, the town also serves as a working settlement for the nearby polymer factory in Gyýanly and urea plant in Garabogaz.

In 2018, the Government floated a tender for construction of a "sturgeon farm" and a "fish processing facility."
