= Sülmen =

Village in Turkmenistan

Sülmen Sülmen obasy
- Village
- Location in Turkmenistan
- Coordinates: 40°25′11″N 53°18′45″E
- Country: Turkmenistan
- Province: Balkan Province
- District: Türkmenbaşy District
- Town: Türkmenbaşy şäherçesi

Population (2022 official census)
  - Total: 195
- Time zone: UTC+5

Sülmen is a village in Türkmenbaşy District, Balkan Province, Turkmenistan. The village is subordinate to the town of Türkmenbaşy. In 2022, it had a population of 195 people.

== Subordination ==
Sülmen is subordinated to the town of Türkmenbaşy along with two other villages, Sülmen, and Ýaňyajy.

== See also ==
- List of municipalities in Balkan Province
