= Turkmenbashi railway station =

Railway station in Turkmenbashy, Balkan Province, Turkmenistan

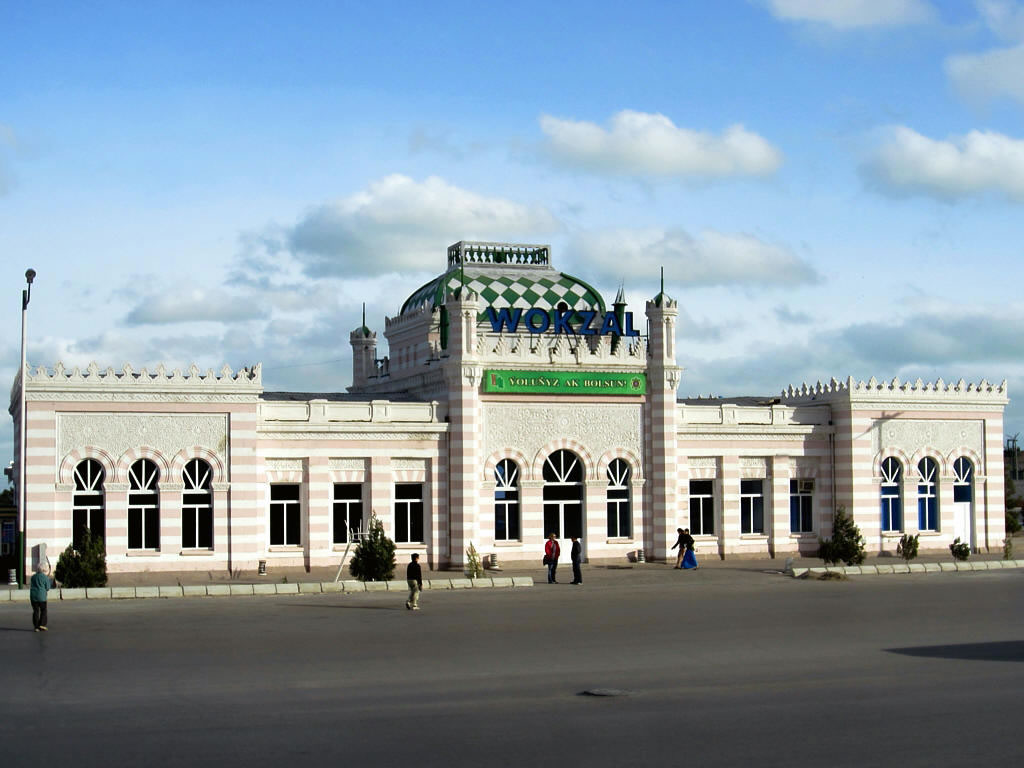

General information
- Location: Turkmenbashi, Turkmenistan
- Coordinates: 40°00′14″N 52°59′41″E

Construction
- Parking: 50 cars

History
- Opened: 1895
- Former names: Alexeï Léontiévitch Benois
Location

Turkmenbashi railway station (Turkmen: Türkmenbaşy demirýol menzili) is the main railway station in Turkmenbashi, Turkmenistan. It was built in 1895. The station is operated by the state owned company Türkmendemirýollary.

== History ==
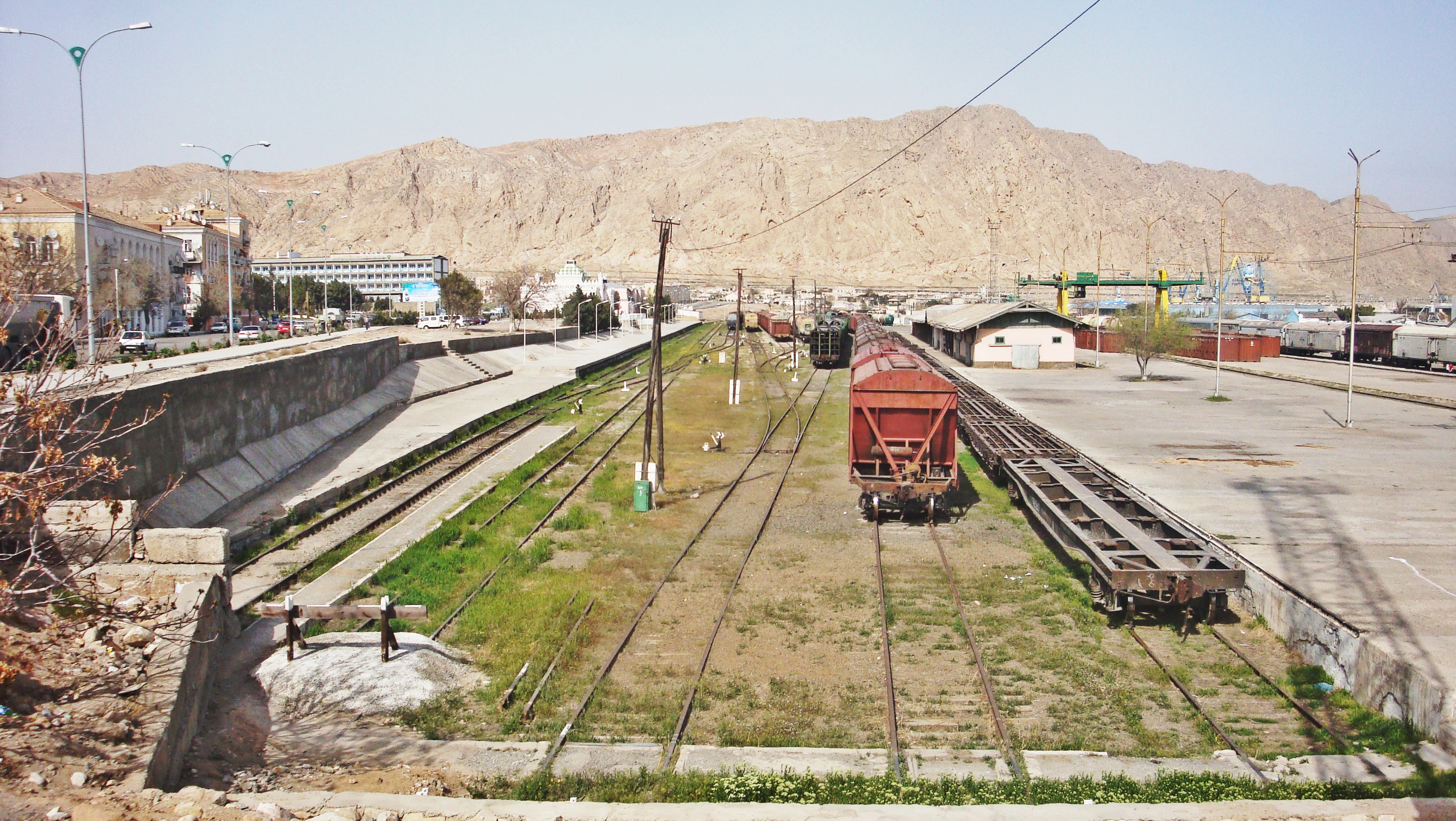
Depot

Station Turkmenbashi in the Moorish style was built in the years 1895–96. The station building was designed by Architect Aleksey Benua, who had worked in Krasnovodsk. The architecture of the station contains many elements of the Romanov Palace.

As early as 1931, the Krasnovodsk-Chardzhou railway was converted to diesel traction.

The railway station is a single-story building with thick, high walls. It includes three rooms: one with ticket counters, another with seating for passengers, and a central corridor providing access to the platform and the exterior. Staircases connect the station building to the passenger platform. The basement houses administrative and utility rooms. The station is designated as a 19th-century historical monument.

Railway Station Square is located near to a memorial to Turkmen soldiers killed in the Great Patriotic War.

== Service ==
There are train route 606/605 Ashgabat - Turkmenbashi - Ashgabat.

Train Number	From – To	Distance	Duration
605	Türkmenbaşy – Ashgabat	557 km	14h 45m
606	Ashgabat – Türkmenbaşy	557 km	14h 22m

== See also ==
- Railway stations in Turkmenistan
