= Gyzylsuw =

Town in Turkmenistan

Gyzylsuw Gyzylsuw şäherçesi
- Town
- Location of Gyzylsuw in Turkmenistan
- Coordinates: 39°47′52″N 53°00′42″E
- Country: Turkmenistan
- Province: Balkan Province
- District: Türkmenbaşy District

Population (2022 official census)
  - Total: 859
- Time zone: UTC +5 TMT

Gyzylsuw, formerly known as Kizyl-Su (in Russian: Кизыл-Су), is a town in Türkmenbaşy District, Balkan region, Turkmenistan. As of 2022, is population reached 859 people.

== Etymology ==
In Turkmen, Gyzylsuw is a compound of the words "Gyzyl" and "Suw," meaning "Red" and "Water" respectively. The word "Red" was used in a lot of Russian-soviet toponyms, including in Turkmenistan.

== Location ==
The town is located at the southern end of a former peninsula, now an islet. Nowadays, it is the last remaining permanent settlement on this land.
