= Türkmenbaşy Gulf =

Türkmenbaşy Gulf Türkmenbaşy Aýlagy
- Türkmenbaşy Bay; Balkan Gulf; Krasnovodsk Gulf
- Türkmenbaşy Aýlagy (Turkmen)
- Location within Caspian Sea
- Coordinates: 39°50′N 53°10′E
- Type: Bay
- Ocean/sea sources: Caspian Sea
- Basin countries: Turkmenistan

Ramsar Wetland
- Official name: Turkmenbashy Bay
- Designated: 23 February 2008
- Reference no.: 1855

The Türkmenbaşy Gulf or Türkmenbaşy Aýlagy or Türkmenbaşy Bay (Turkmen: Türkmenbaşy aýlagy, Russian: залив Туркменбашы) is a bay of the Caspian Sea in the coast of Turkmenistan.

With the Türkmenbaşy Peninsula to the north and the Cheleken Peninsula to the south, the gulf extends westwards into the sea for 46 km and has an 18 km wide mouth. At its northwest corner are the Bala-Ishem salt marshes, which mark the mouth of the dried-up Uzboy River. It became part of the Hazar Nature Reserve in 1968 and was designated as a Ramsar site in 2008. Among the animals in the bay the Krasnovodsk herring (Alosa braschnikowi nirchi) and the Caspian seal deserve mention.

== Cartography ==
In 18th century maps of the Caspian Sea, the gulf was known as 'Balkan Gulf' or 'Balchan Gulf' and was assumed to be much deeper. It was first accurately cartographed by Fedor Ivanovich Soimonov during the 1719 Caspian Expedition, which surveyed the Caspian Sea from 1719 to 1727.

The bay was later known as 'Krasnovodsk Gulf' or 'Krasnovodsk Bay', but it changed its name when the city at its shores changed its name from Krasnovodsk to Türkmenbaşy.

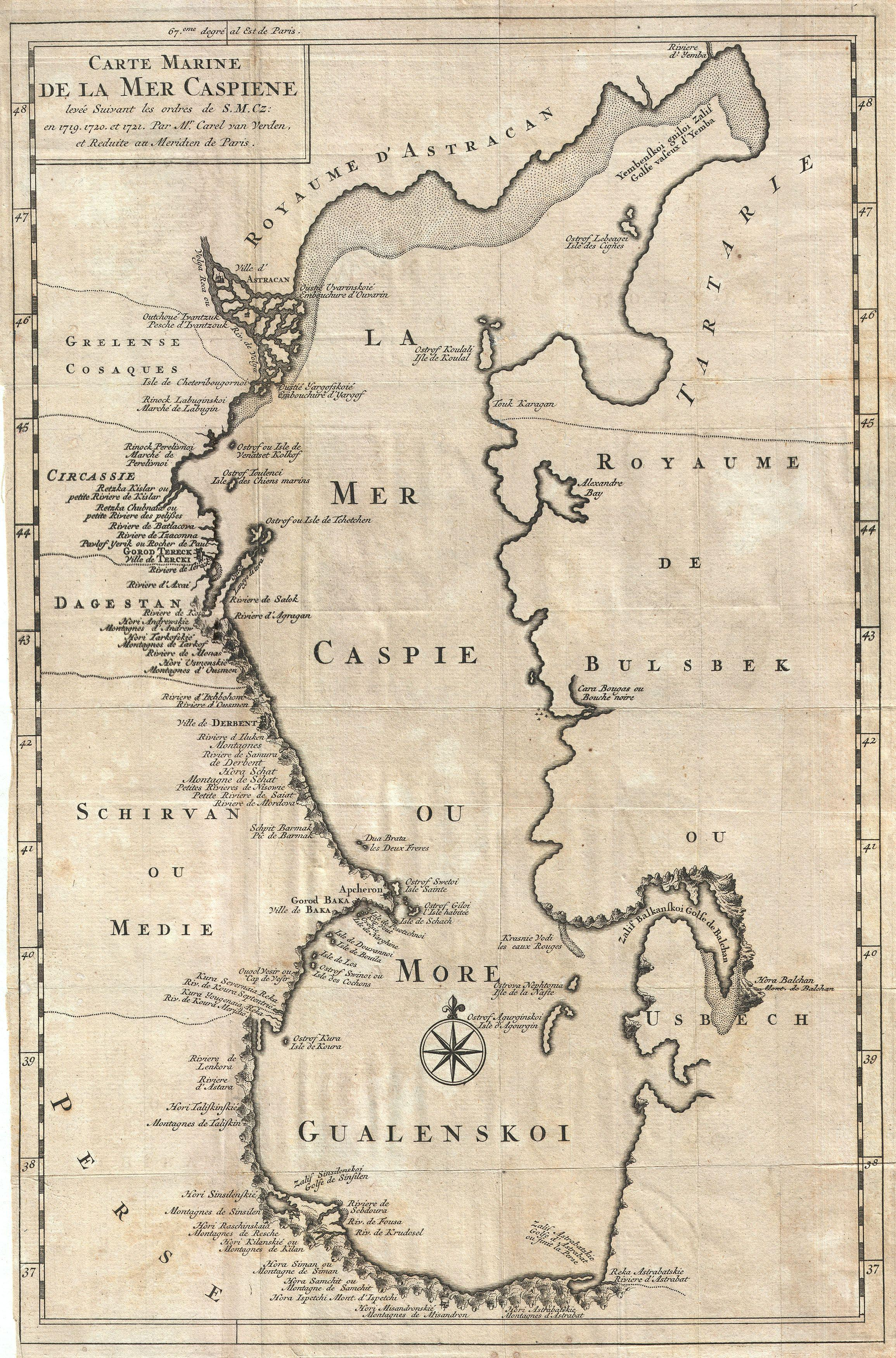
1721 Van Verden map of the Caspian Sea with the Golphe de Balchan cutting deep inland.

== See also ==
- Türkmenbaşy
