= Transport in Turkmenistan =

Transport in Turkmenistan includes roadways, railways, airways, seaways, and waterways, as well as oil-, gas-, and water pipelines. Road-, rail-, and waterway transport fall under the jurisdiction of the Ministry of Industry and Communications.

During Soviet times Turkmenistan's transportation infrastructure was in general disrepair and neglected.

Since 1991, Turkmenistan has completed a number of major national and international transportation projects.

Turkmenistan is also part of the international transport corridor created under the Ashgabat Agreement, signed by India, Oman, Iran, Turkmenistan, Uzbekistan and Kazakhstan, for creating an international transport and transit corridor facilitating transportation of goods between Central Asia and the Persian Gulf.

== Airways ==
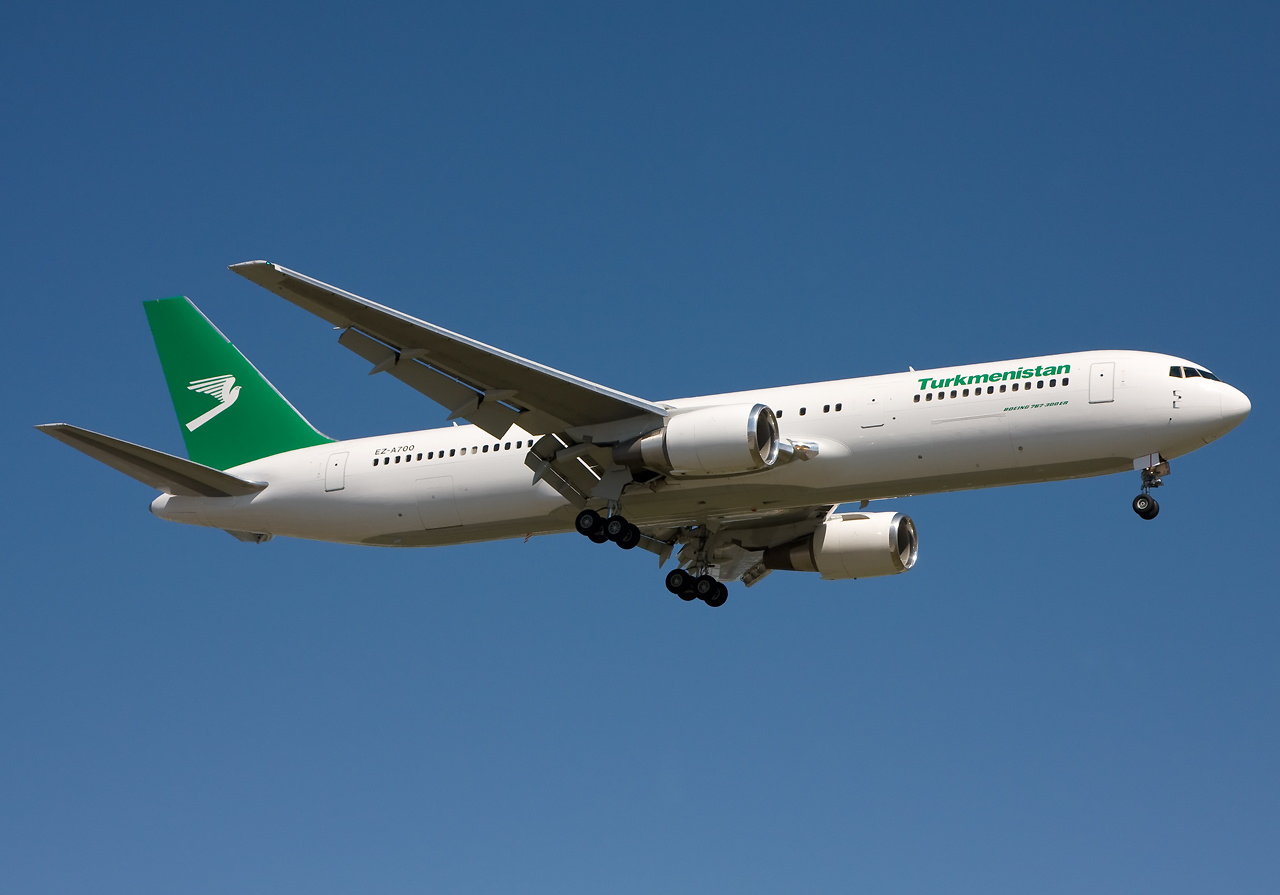
Turkmenistan Airlines Boeing 767-300ER.

Air service began in 1927 with a route between Chardzhou (Türkmenabat) and Tashauz (Dashoguz), flying German Junkers 13 and Soviet K-4 aircraft, each capable of carrying four passengers. In 1932, an aerodrome was built in Ashgabat on the site of the current Howdan neighborhoods, for both passenger and freight service, the latter mainly to deliver supplies to sulfur mines near Derweze in the Karakum Desert.

Airports serving the major cities of Ashgabat, Dashoguz, Mary, Turkmenabat, and Türkmenbaşy, which are operated by Turkmenistan's civil aviation authority, Türkmenhowaýollary, feature scheduled domestic commercial air service. Under normal circumstances international scheduled commercial air service is limited to Ashgabat. During the COVID-19 pandemic, however, international flights take off from and land at Turkmenabat, where quarantine facilities have been established.

State-owned Turkmenistan Airlines is the only Turkmen air carrier. Turkmenistan Airlines' passenger fleet is composed only of Boeing aircraft. Air transport carries more than two thousand passengers daily in the country. Under normal conditions, international flights annually transport over half a million people into and out of Turkmenistan, and Turkmenistan Air operates regular flights to Moscow, London, Frankfurt, Birmingham, Bangkok, Delhi, Abu Dhabi, Amritsar, Kyiv, Lviv, Beijing, Istanbul, Minsk, Almaty, Tashkent, and St. Petersburg.

Small airfields serve industrial sites near other cities, but do not feature scheduled commercial passenger service. Airfields slated for modernization and expansion include Garabogaz, Jebel, and Galaymor. A new airport at Kerki was commissioned in June 2021 and is slated to begin regular domestic passenger service in January 2022. The new Turkmenabat International Airport was commissioned in February 2018. In 2014, Turkmenistan had an estimated 26 airports. One heliport was in operation.

== Railways ==
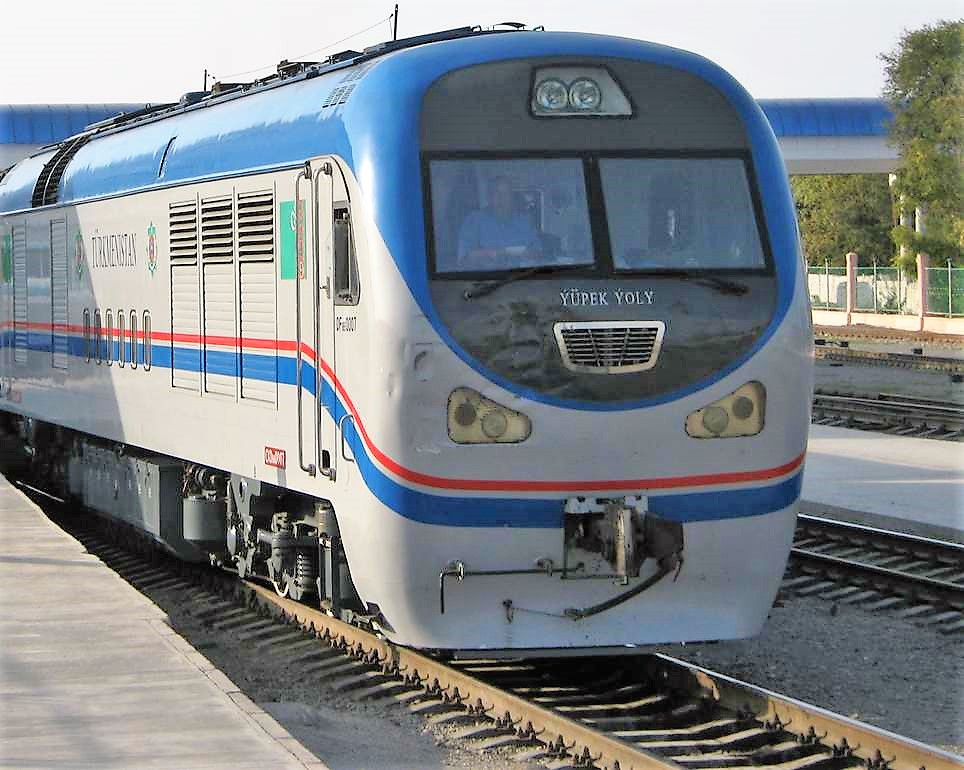
Turkmen Diesel locomotive

The first rail line in Turkmenistan was built in 1880, from the eastern shore of the Caspian Sea to Mollagara. By October 1881 the line was extended to Kyzyl-Arvat (today's Gyzylarbat), by 1886 had reached Chardzhou (today's Turkmenabat). In 1887 a wooden rail bridge was built over the Amu Darya, and the line was continued to Samarkand (1888) and Tashkent (1898). The rail line connecting Mary to Serhetabat was completed in 1898, and the train ferry between Krasnovodsk (today's Türkmenbaşy) and Baku began operating in 1905.

Rail service in Turkmenistan began as part of Imperial Russia's Trans-Caspian Railway, then of the Central Asian Railway. After the collapse of the USSR, the railway network in Turkmenistan was transferred to and operated by state-owned Türkmendemirýollary.

Rail gauge is the standard Russian- and Soviet 1520 millimeters.

The total length of railways is 3181 km. Only domestic passenger service is available, except for special trains operated by tour operators. The railway carries approximately 5.5 million passengers and moves nearly 24 million tons of freight per year.

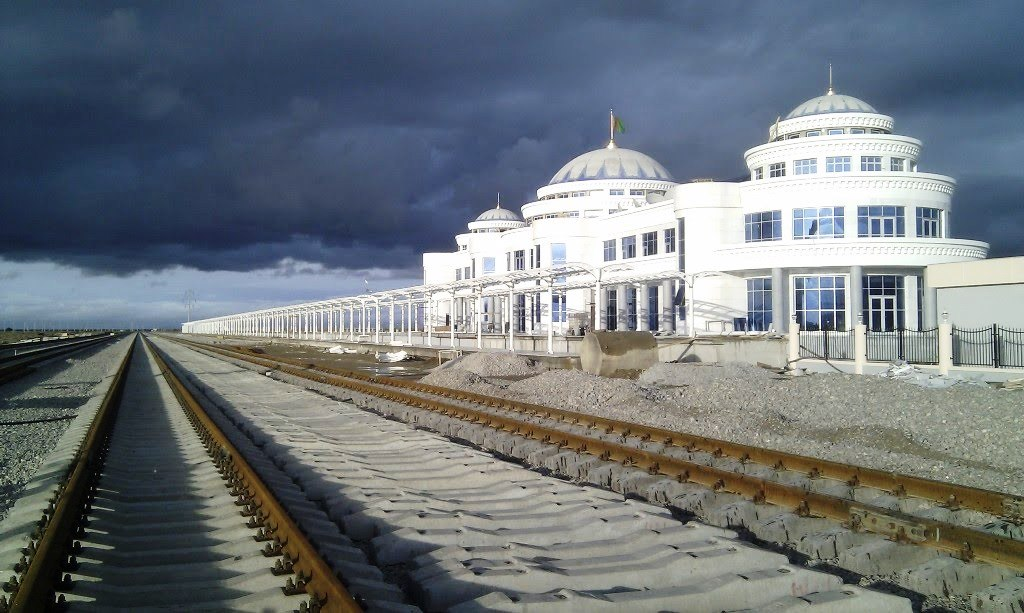
Bereket Railway Station in (Bereket) is an important junction of the Trans-Caspian Railway and North-South Transnational Railway.

The Tejen-Sarahs-Mashhad railway, built in 1996 by Turkmenistan and Iran, has become a vital freight link of Central Asian-, Russian-, and European rail systems with South Asia and the Persian Gulf. In 2006 the Trans-Karakum Railway, a direct link between Ashgabat and Dashoguz, halved travel time between the southern and northern borders.

The Kazakhstan-Turkmenistan-Iran railway link, part of the North–South Transport Corridor, is a 677 km (421 mi)-long railway line connecting Kazakhstan and Turkmenistan with Iran and the Persian Gulf since 2014. It links Uzen in Kazakhstan with Bereket and Etrek in Turkmenistan and ends at Gorgan in Iran's Golestan province. In Iran, the railway connects to the national network, including seaports on the Persian Gulf. The project cost an estimated $620 million, shared by the governments of Kazakhstan, Turkmenistan and Iran. This link of the North-South Transnational Railway runs 137 km in Kazakhstan, 470 km in Turkmenistan and 70 km in Iran. Work in Turkmenistan commenced in Bereket in December 2007 and in Kazakhstan in July 2009, and was completed in late 2014.

In late 2016, a railway line from Kerki south to Ymamnazar on the border with Afghanistan and beyond to Aqina in Andkhoy District was opened. It is expected to become part of a railway corridor through northern Afghanistan. This line was subsequently extended to Andkhoy.

In February 2018, the existing rail line between Serhetabat and Torghundi in Afghanistan was restored to service. This line is planned to be extended to Herat, where it could potentially connect to a rail line under construction from Khaf, Iran.

=== Rolling stock ===
The Asian Development Bank reported in 2021,

In 2019, TRA had a rolling stock fleet of 119 diesel locomotives, 10,056 freight wagons, and 425 passenger cars. The majority of locomotives and all the passenger cars were purchased from the PRC (25 CKD9A-series passenger locomotives and 83 CKD9C-series freight locomotives). The freight wagon fleet included 2,849 tanker wagons, 1,738 gondola wagons, 1,637 platform wagons, 1,358 closed hopper wagons, 1,143 box wagons and 654 refrigerated wagons.... In 2019, 6,607 wagons (65% of the fleet) [were] at least 30 years old, with many of these wagons having exceeded their normal economic life and in need of replacement.

=== Railway links with adjacent countries ===
- Iran - yes, freight only - 1,520 mm (4 ft 11 27/32 in)/1,435 mm (4 ft 8 1/2 in) break-of-gauge
- Afghanistan - yes, freight only - two links, from Ymamnazar to Aqina and (very short) from Serhetabat to Torghundi, no passenger service
- Kazakhstan - new rail link opened in 2013.
- Uzbekistan - yes, service halted indefinitely
- Caspian Sea - irregular ferry, passenger only.

== Roadways ==
Prior to the 1917 Russian Revolution only three automobiles existed in Turkmenistan, all of them foreign models in Ashgabat. No automobile roads existed between settlements. After the revolution, Soviet authorities graded dirt roads to connect Mary and Kushky (Serhetabat), Tejen and Sarahs, Kyzyl-Arvat (Serdar) with Garrygala (Magtymguly) and Chekishler, i.e., with important border crossings. In 1887-1888 the Gaudan Highway (Russian: Гауданское шоссе) was built between Ashgabat and the Persian border at Gaudan Pass, and Persian authorities extended it to Mashad, allowing for easier commercial relations. Municipal bus service began in Ashgabat in 1925 with five routes, and taxicab service began in 1938 with five vehicles. The road network was extended in the 1970s with construction of republic-level highways connecting Ashgabat and Kazanjik (Bereket), Ashgabat and Bayramaly, Nebit Dag (Balkanabat) and Krasnovodsk (Türkmenbaşy), Chardzhou (Türkmenabat) and Kerki, and Mary and Kushka (Serhetabat). As of 2001 Turkmenistan had an estimated 22,000 kilometers of roads, about 18,000 kilometers of which were paved.

The primary west-east motor route is the M37 highway linking the Turkmenbashy International Seaport to the Farap border crossing via Ashgabat, Mary, and Turkmenabat. The primary north-south route is the Ashgabat-Dashoguz Automobile Road (Turkmen: Aşgabat-Daşoguz awtomobil ýoly), built in the 2000s. Major international routes include European route E003, European route E60, European route E121, and Asian Highway (AH) routes AH5, AH70, AH75, AH77, and AH78.

A new toll motorway is under construction between Ashgabat and Turkmenabat by “Türkmen Awtoban” company, which was originally scheduled to construct the 600-km highway in three phases: Ashgabat-Tejen by December 2020, Tejen-Mary by December 2022 and Mary-Turkmenabat by December 2023. As a result of delays due to financial shortfalls, the Ashgabat-Tejen phase is now scheduled for completion in September 2021. A sister project to link Türkmenbaşy and Ashgabat was suspended when the Turkish contractor, Polimeks, walked away from the project, reportedly because of non-payment.

As of 29 January 2019, the Turkmen Automobile Roads state concern (Turkmen: Türkmenawtoýollary) was subordinated by presidential decree to the Ministry of Construction and Architecture, and responsibility for road construction and maintenance was shifted to provincial and municipal governments. Operation of motor coaches (buses) and taxicabs is the responsibility of the Automobile Services Agency (Turkmen: Türkmenawtoulaglary Agentligi) of the Ministry of Industry and Communication. The Turkmen Automobile Roads state concern was upgraded to ministry status on 11 July 2025 by presidential decree.

Turkmenistan has one of the lowest gasoline prices in the world. In 2011 95-octane gasoline was priced at $0.72 per gallon ($0.19 per liter). As of March 2021, the state-controlled price was 1.50 manat per liter, or U.S. 43¢ per liter ($1.62 per gallon).

== Riverways ==
The main inland waterways are the Amu Darya River, which runs along the northern border, and the Karakum Canal, which runs from east to west from the Amu Darya near the Afghanistan border through Mary and Ashgabat to Bereket.

The official beginning of organized navigation on the Amu Darya occurred in 1873. Steamboats began plying the Amu Darya in 1888, with reassembly and launching of a Russian-built steamboat delivered to Çärjew in pieces. Navigation was hindered by the constantly shifting sandbars and islands that the river current formed and swept away. In 1917 there were on the Amu Darya between 20 and 50 self-propelled vessels and about 1500 boats. In 1923 the Central Asian Turkmenabat Shipping Company began providing services to Turkmenistan, Uzbekistan, Tajikistan and 10 regions of Kazakhstan, and transported loads by water across 1500 kilometers.

On August 15, 1992, the Turkmen River Shipping Company was established. In 2003, it was renamed State Concern Turkmen Riverways (Türkmenderýaýollary), but subsequently reverted to a state agency subordinate to a series of ministries. In February 2021 the production subsidiary of Türkmenderýaýollary was converted into an open joint-stock company.

In the mid-20th century Soviet authorities began construction of the Karakum Canal. The first phase was approved in 1952, and construction began in 1954. By 1959 in the first phase the canal had connected the Amu Darya to the Murghab River. In 1961 the canal was extended to the Tejen River in a second phase. A third phase, to bring water to Ashgabat, was accelerated due to the 1961 drought, and water from the Amu Darya was first delivered to the capital city on May 12, 1962. Next followed construction of the Gurtly and Köpetdag Water Reservoirs, and then came the fourth phase, extension of the canal as far as Bereket, which was completed in 1981. From Bereket, water is delivered to Balkanabat, Hazar and Turkmenbashy by pipeline. The 1,100-kilometer canal, designed mainly for irrigation, is navigable for 200 kilometers from the Amu Darya. The Amu Darya is navigable in Turkmenistan for about 320 kilometers downstream from the Afghanistan border to Turkmenabat.

== Major ports and harbours ==
Turkmenistan's largest seaport by far is Turkmenbashy International Seaport. The port was opened in October 1896. The Merchant Seaport Authority was founded in 1903. The port was substantially reconstructed between 2000 and 2003. Passenger ferry service to the port of Baku, Azerbaijan as well as rail ferries to other ports on the Caspian Sea (Baku, Aktau) began in 1962. In recent years tanker transport of oil to the ports of Baku and Makhachkala has increased.

In May 2018 construction was completed of a major expansion of the Turkmenbashy seaport. Cost of the project was $1.5 billion. The general contractor for the project was Gap Inşaat, a subsidiary of Çalık Holding of Turkey. The expansion added 17 million tons of annual capacity, making total throughput including previously existing facilities of over 25 million tons per year. The international ferry and passenger terminals can serve 300,000 passengers and 75,000 vehicles per year, and the container terminal is designed to handle 400,000 TEU (20-foot container equivalent) per year. Turkmenbashy International Seaport includes a shipyard. The port authority also oversees operations of the Kenar, Alaja, and Ekerem oil loading terminals.

Smaller industrial loading terminals are located at Hazar (oil), Kiyanly (Turkmen: Gyýanly) (plastics), and Garabogaz (urea).

In 2006 Turkmenistan had eight merchant marine vessels of more than 1,000 tons displacement, of which four were cargo ships, two were oil tankers, one was for refrigerated cargo, and one was a combination ore and oil ship. As of 2019 the national maritime carrier, closed joint-stock company Marine Merchant Fleet, possessed 19 ships, including 4 dry cargo vessels, 7 oil tankers, 2 Ro-Pax ferries, 3 passenger-only ferries, 2 tugboats, and one yacht.

== See also ==
- Railways in Turkmenistan
- Turkmenistan Airlines
