= Port of Olya =

Sea port in Oblast, Russia

Olya is a sea port in Olya village settlement in Limansky District in Astrakhan Oblast, Russia. It is located in the Volga Delta, on the right shore of the Bakhtemir river (67th km of the Volga-Caspian canal). According to the information on the official website, Olya port has 10 docks 5m deep. The length of the waterfront is 688,2m, water area is 53,12km², the throughput capacity of the cargo terminals is 1,580,000 tons a year.

The first dock row started operating on June the 3rd in 1997. In 1996 a 5,4km long highway was brought to the port. In July 2004 the construction of a 55km long railway siding from the “Zenseli” to “Olya Port” station was completed. The course of action includes the construction of a second cargo district with planned turnover of 26 million tons, which would be located 4km south of the main one.

Under the order of the Federal Agency for Maritime and River Transportation of March 31st 2010, Olya port is assigned index number K-2.

In the Olya port various cargoes are transferred: rolled metal (rough material, armature rodes, steel coils, etc), lumber, palletized cargoes, bulk bags (fertilizers, cement, chemicals), various bulk dry cargoes (carbonite, coal, cast iron, ferro-alloys), grain cargoes, oil, equipment, large-capacity and long cargoes, intermodal containers, etc.
