= Türkmenbaşy International Seaport =

Main passenger harbour and cargo port in Türkmenbaşy, Turkmenistan

Türkmenbaşy International Seaport Türkmenbaşy Halkara deňiz porty
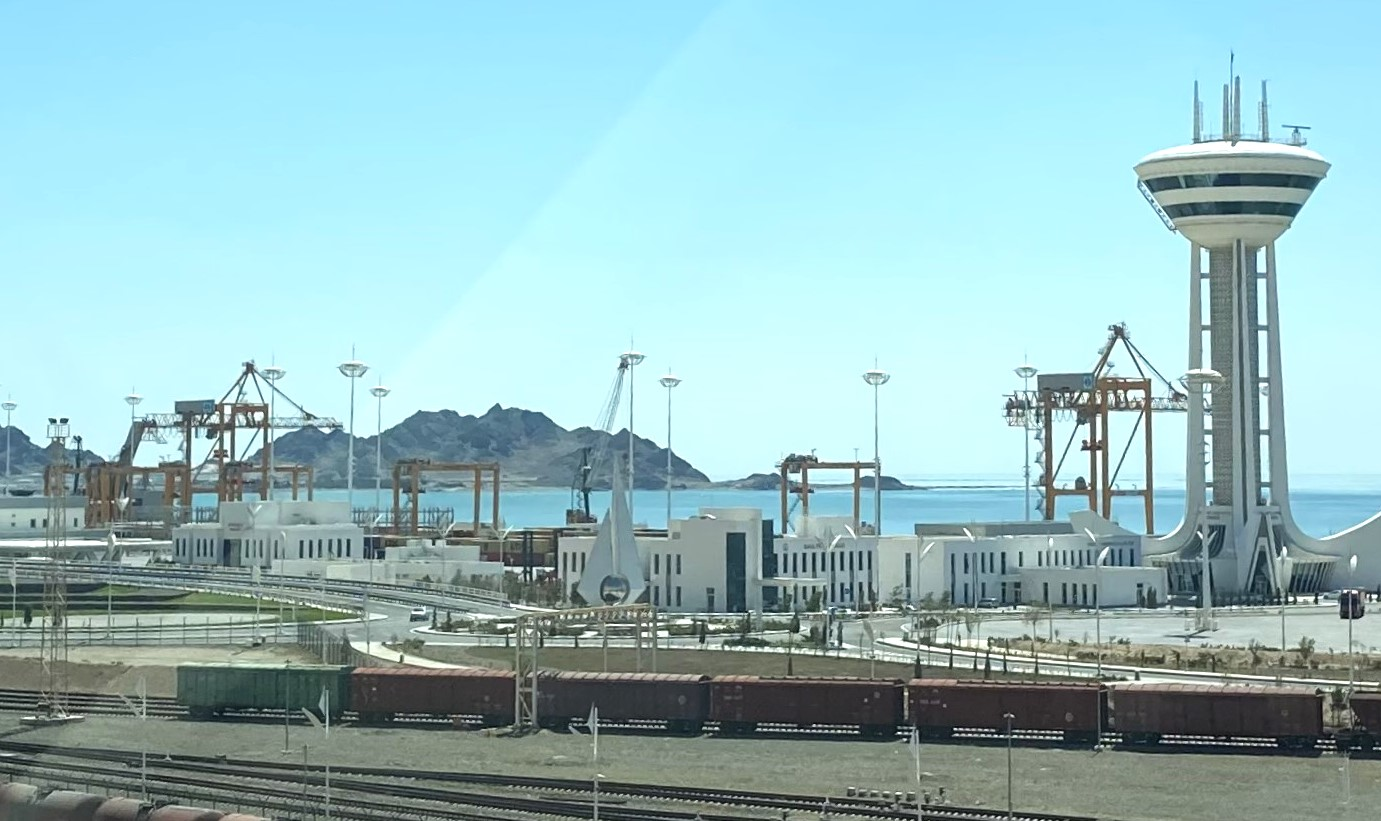
- Interactive map of Türkmenbaşy International Seaport; Türkmenbaşy Halkara deňiz porty

Location
- Country: Turkmenistan
- Location: Türkmenbaşy, Balkan Region
- Coordinates: 40°0′N 53°2′E
- UN/LOCODE: TMKRW

Details
- Opened: 1896
- Operated by: Turkmendenizderyayollary Agency
- Owned by: Government of Turkmenistan
- Type of harbour: passenger port, cargo port
- Size: 150 ha (370 acres)
- Employees: over 500
- Director: Seýitguly Baýseidow

Statistics
- Website www.port.com.tm

Türkmenbaşy International Seaport (Turkmen: Türkmenbaşy Halkara deňiz porty) is the main passenger harbour and cargo port in Türkmenbaşy, Turkmenistan.

It is located in the eastern part of the Caspian Sea. Regular lines serve routes to Baku (Azerbaijan), Aktau (Kazakhstan) and Astrakhan (Russia).

It is the largest seaport in Turkmenistan.

== History ==
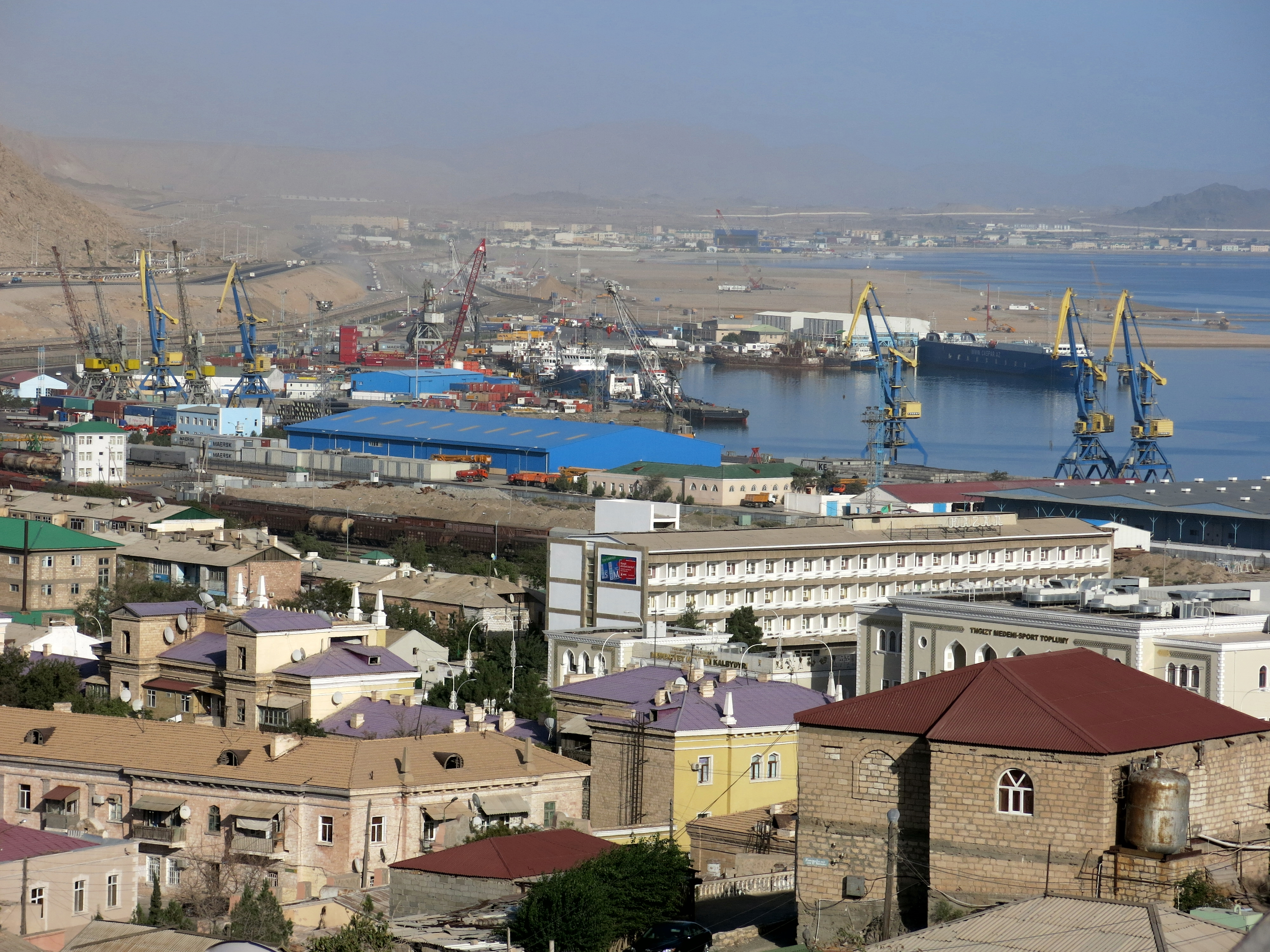
Turkmenbashi International Seaport landscape

The port was founded in October 1896 on the eastern coast of the Caspian Sea.

On January 1, 1903, the Merchant marine port Authority was established.

Cargo traffic increased over the years, therefore, an idea occurred to build a ferry terminal. In 1959, the port began construction of a ferry. Regular voyages on the ferryline from Baku to Krasnovodsk started in 1962. The ferry terminal transportation has significantly accelerated cargo delivery.

In 2000–2003, a massive reconstruction project began. The old port was reconstructed along with construction of new berths for ships and warehouses and other facilities with modern equipment. This made it possible to provide port services at the highest level.

In 2013, the port built passenger catamaran "Charlak". It was the first shipbuilding project of this level in the history of the port.

On August 15, 2013 the construction of a new port began. It cost $2 billion and was built by Turkish company GAP İnşaat. At the groundbreaking ceremony was attended by President of Turkmenistan Gurbanguly Berdimuhamedov and Turkish Prime Minister Recep Tayyip Erdoğan. Construction was completed in 2018. The project involves the construction of the ferry, passenger and cargo terminals in 1 mln 200 thousand square meters. It is also planned to build a shipyard.

== Importance ==
The port has great geopolitical importance in Eurasia. Being on the trade route Europe-Caucasus-Asia (TRACECA), it is able to accommodate vessels throughout the year, around the clock to carry out loading and unloading operations. The port is a "sea gate", linking Central Asia to Europe by sea, road and rail routes and serves as a major transit hub in the region.

== International cooperation ==
The port of Turkmenbashi has a connection with the ports of the following cities:

- Port of Astrakhan, Russia
- Port of Olya, Russia
- Port of Makhachkala, Russia
- Port of Baku, Azerbaijan
- Port of Hövsan, Azerbaijan
- Port of Kuryk, Kazakhstan
- Port of Aktau, Kazakhstan

== Numismatics ==
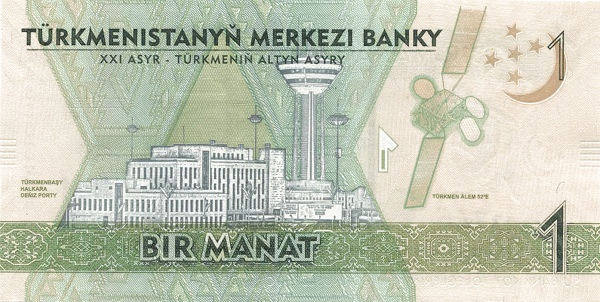
1 manat

Since 2020 the Turkmenbashi International Seaport appears on the obverse of the 1 banknote of Turkmen_manat.

== Gallery ==
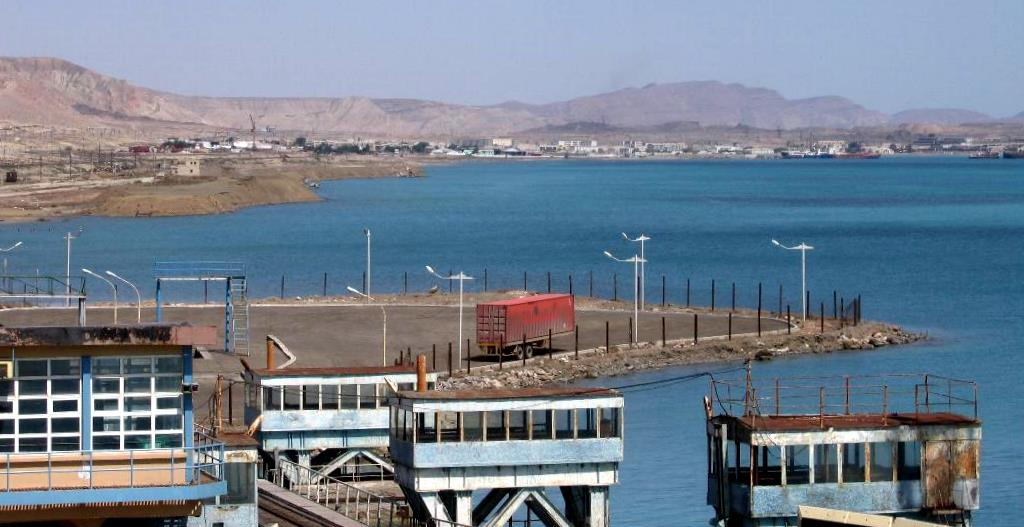
Caspian Sea at the Port of Türkmenbaşy

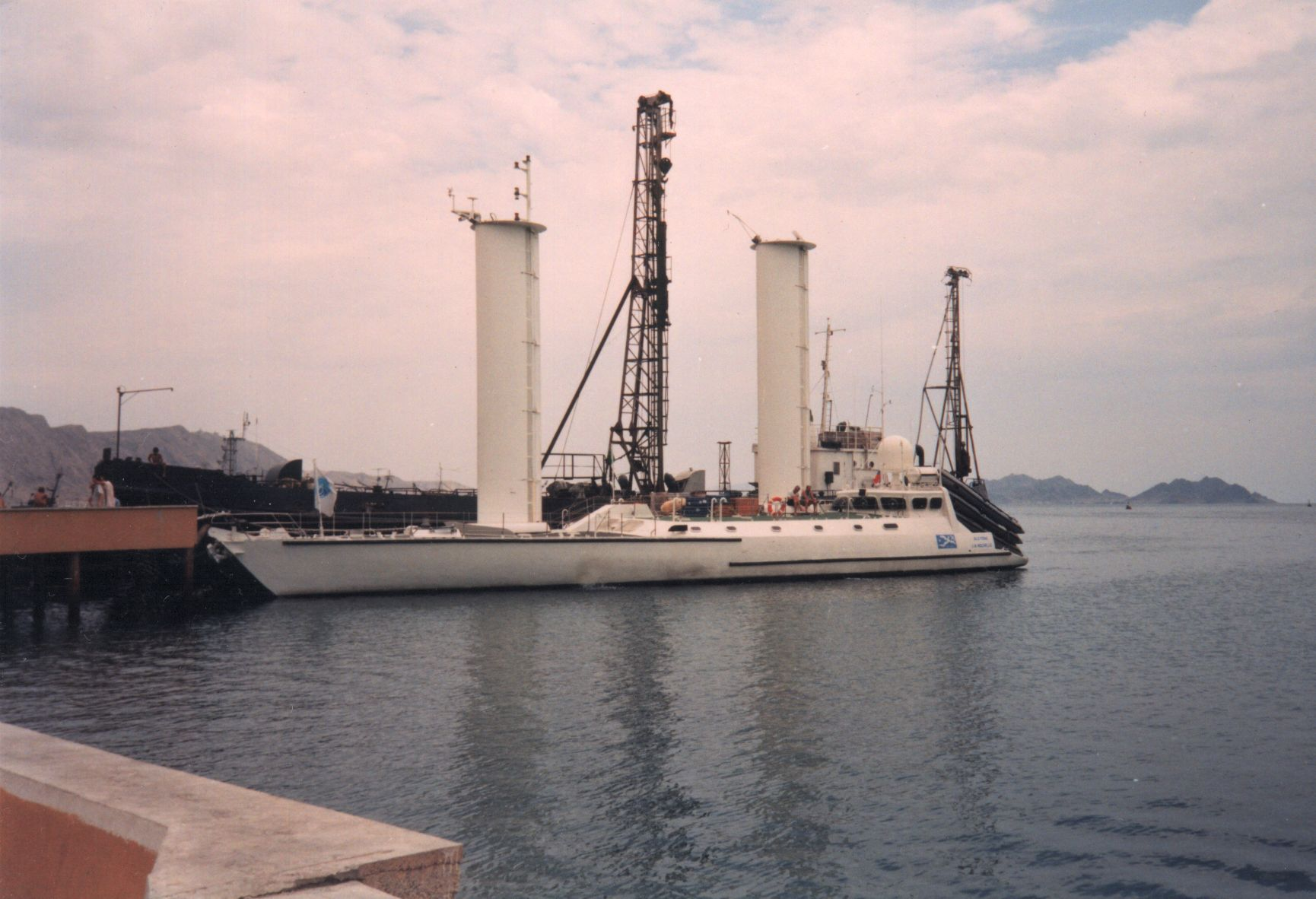
Alcyone in 1998, Port of Türkmenbaşy

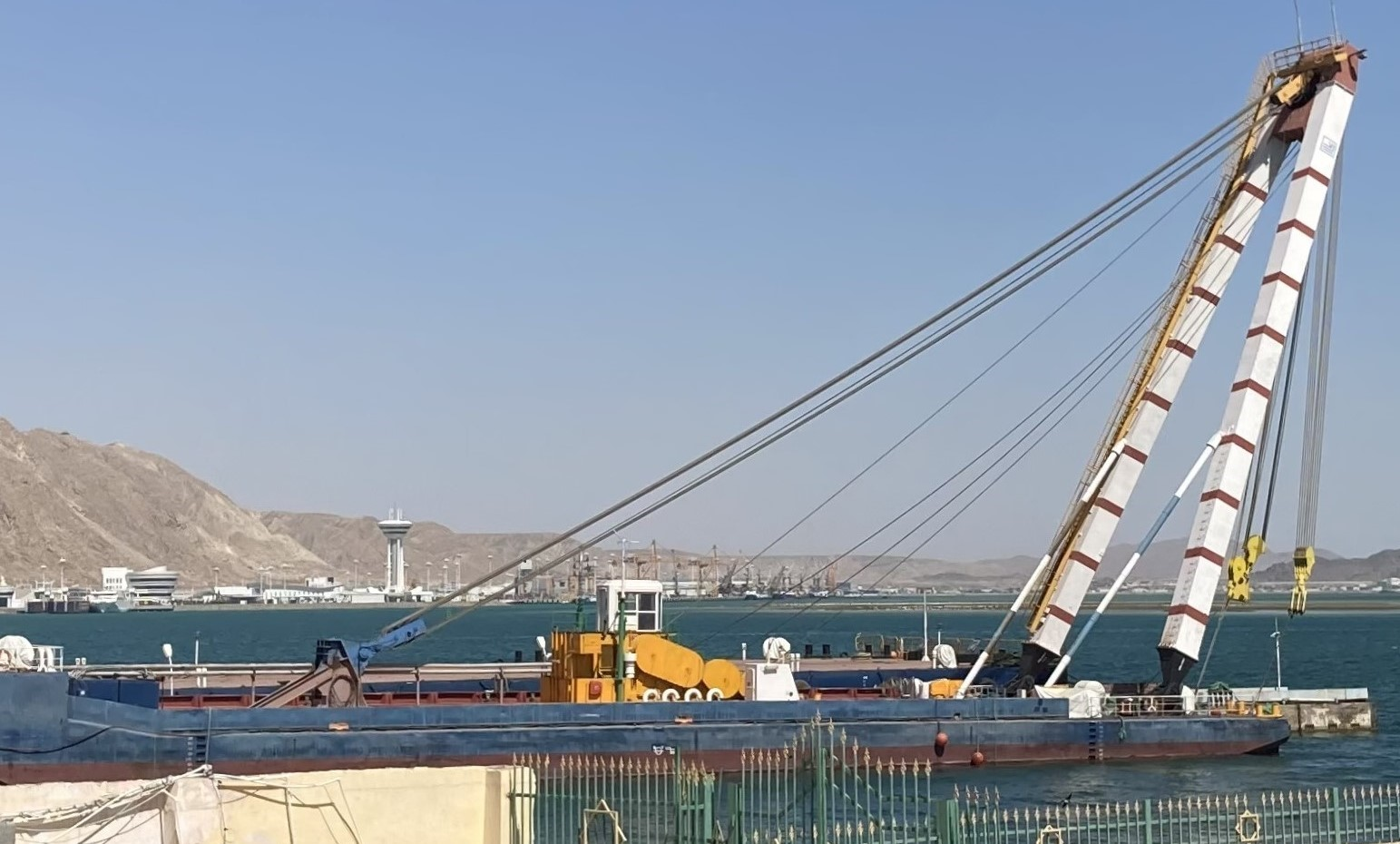

== See also ==
- Transport in Turkmenistan
- Türkmenbaşy International Airport
