= Türkmenbaşy şäherçesi =

Town in Balkan Province, Turkmenistan

Türkmenbaşy Türkmenbaşy şäherçesi
- Town
- Location in Turkmenistan
- Coordinates: 40°0′37″N 53°6′49″E
- Country: Turkmenistan
- Province: Balkan Province
- District: Türkmenbaşy District

Population (2022 official census)
  - Town: 9,007
  - Urban: 7,334
  - Rural: 1,673
- Time zone: UTC+5

Türkmenbaşy, formerly known as Jaňga, is a town and the administrative center of Türkmenbaşy District, Balkan Province, Turkmenistan. The town is located on the Caspian Sea coast, east of the city of Türkmenbaşy, with which it should not be confused. In 2022, it had a population of 7,334 people.

== Etymology ==
Soltanşa Atanyýazow notes that Jaňga is a Kazakh variant of the name of a local well called Ýanyja. The name was changed to Türkmenbaşy, in reference to then President Saparmurat Niyazov.

== History ==
Known then as Jaňga, the settlement was granted the status of a "town of urban type" in 1940. On 9 March 1993, it was renamed Türkmenbaşy. The town is primarily noted as the site of Jaňga Naval Base, the home port of the Turkmen Navy.

== Transportation ==
The M37 highway passes through the town. It is served by the Gyuşa rail station on the Türkmenbaşy-Ashgabat rail line. It is approximately 20 kilometers from the Turkmenbashi International Airport.

== Dependencies ==
As a town, Türkmenbaşy has three dependent rural villages:

- Hasan, village
- Sülmen, village
- Ýaňyajy, village
