= Türkmenbaşy, Turkmenistan =

City in Balkan Province, Turkmenistan

Türkmenbaşy Türkmenbaşy şäheri
- City
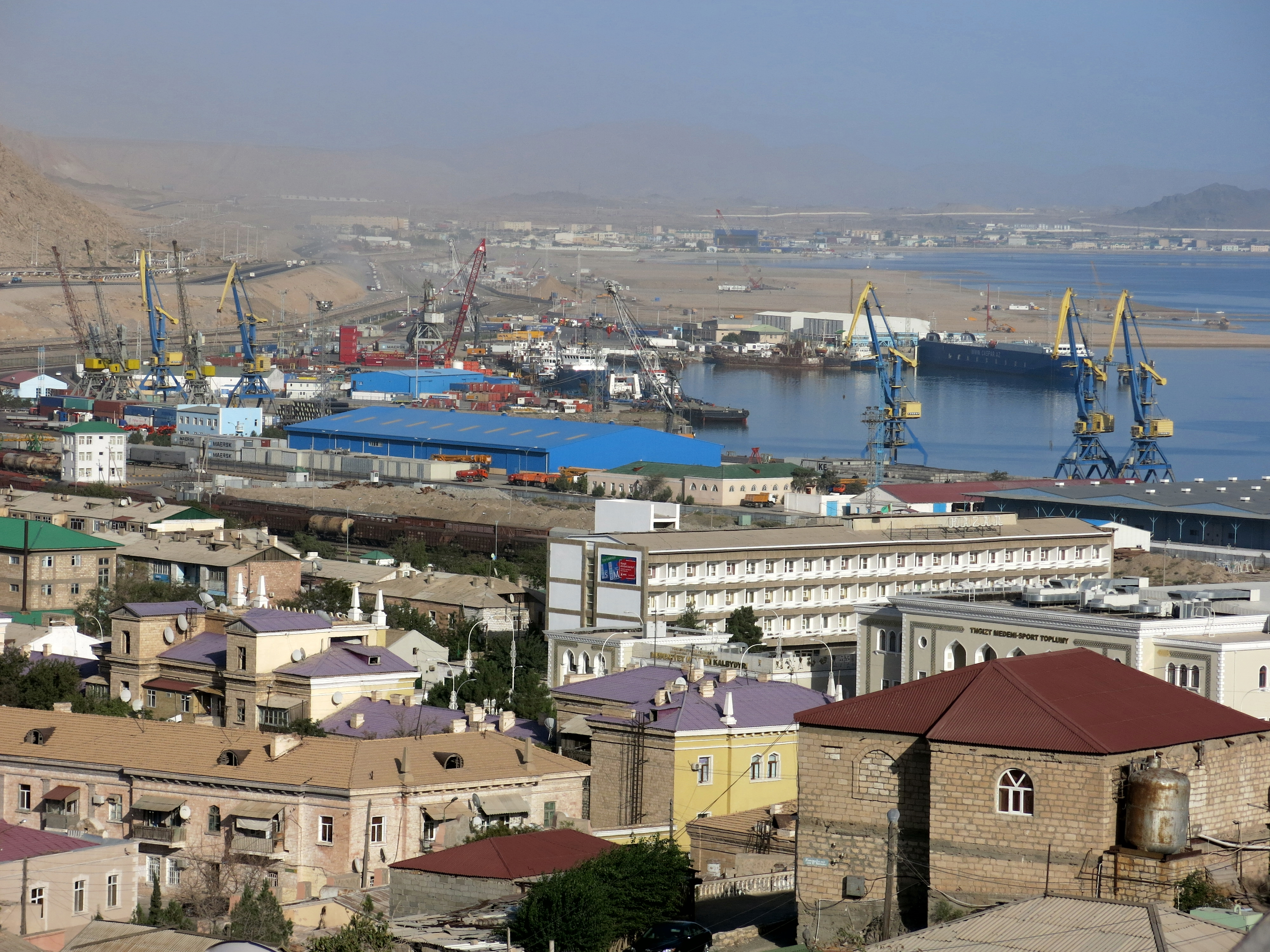
- The city of Türkmenbaşy

- Location in Turkmenistan
- Coordinates: 40°00′22″N 52°59′37″E
- Country: Turkmenistan
- Region: Balkan
- Founded: 1869
- Named for: Saparmurat Niyazov

Government
  - Type: Presidential
  - Mayor: Amangeldi Isaýew

Area
  - Total: 167.4 km^{2} (64.6 sq mi)
- Elevation: 27 m (89 ft)

Population (2022)
  - Total: 91,745
- Time zone: UTC+05:00 (TMT)
- Postal code: 745000
- Area code: +993-243
- Vehicle registration: BN

Türkmenbaşy, previously known as Shagadam (Turkmen: Şagadam), Krasnovodsk (Russian: Красноводск) and Kyzyl-Su, is a major port city in Balkan Province in western Turkmenistan, on the Türkmenbaşy Gulf of the Caspian Sea. It sits at an elevation of 27 metres (89 feet). The population (est 2004) was 86,800, consisting of mostly ethnic Turkmens, with the addition of Russian, Armenian and Azerbaijani minorities. As the terminus of the Trans-Caspian Railway and site of a major seaport on the Caspian, it is an important transportation center. The city is also the site of Turkmenistan's largest oil refining complex.

This city should not be confused with the similarly named town of Türkmenbaşy (Turkmen: Türkmenbaşy şäherçesi), formerly called Janga (Russian: Джанга, Cyrillic Turkmen: Җанга), also in Balkan Province, or the city of Saparmyrat Türkmenbaşy adyndaky in Daşoguz Province.

== History ==
In 1717, Russian Prince Alexander Bekovich-Cherkassky landed and established a secret fortified settlement on this location, where the dry bed of a former mouth of the Amu-Darya River once emptied into the Caspian Sea. His intent was to march an army up this dry riverbed and conquer the Khanate of Khiva. The expedition failed, and the Russians abandoned the settlement for over 150 years.

=== Krasnovodsk ===
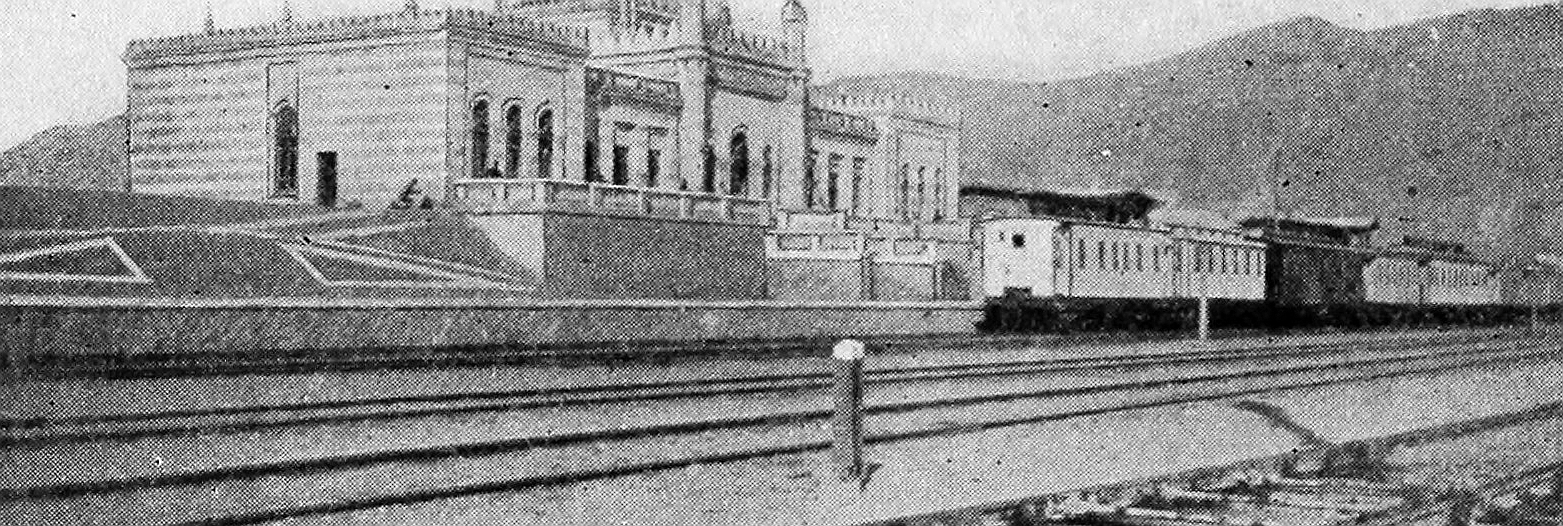
Railway station in Krasnovodsk, 1902

In 1869, the Russians invaded a second time. Having captured the settlement, they named their fort Krasnovodsk (Красноводск), which is a Russian translation of the original name, Kyzyl-Su (Red Water). The fort, Krasnovodsk, served as Imperial Russia's base of operations against Khiva and Bukhara, as well as the semi-nomadic Turkmen tribes.

The railway had originally begun from Uzun-Ada on the Caspian Sea, but the terminus was shifted north to the harbour at Krasnovodsk.

It fell to the Red Army in February 1920.

On 21 November 1939, Krasnovodsk Oblast was formed with its administrative center in Krasnovodsk. The oblast was repeatedly liquidated and restored (23 January 1947, liquidated; 4 April 1952, restored; 9 December 1955, liquidated; 27 December 1973, restored; 25 August 1988, eliminated).

In 1942, a large part of the Polish Anders' Army along with many civilians was evacuated from the USSR via the local port to Iran.

In 1985, the airbase here was attacked by Afghan Mujahideen.

=== Türkmenbaşy ===
On 10 January 1991, Balkan province was created, and on 18 May 1992, was designated a velayat (Turkmen: welaýat) with its capital in Balkanabat. On 8 October 1993, Krasnovodsk was renamed by President for Life Saparmurat Niyazov after his self-proclaimed title Türkmenbaşy ("Head of [all] Turkmens") by Resolution No. 904-XII of Turkmenistan Parliament.

The second President of Turkmenistan, Gurbanguly Berdimuhamedow, pledged in July 2007 to invest $1 billion in a project slated to turn Türkmenbaşy into a major tourist resort. He ordered the development of the Awaza tourist zone, with 60 modern hotels to be built along a 16 km (10 mi) stretch of the Caspian Sea shoreline. Aside from Awaza, Türkmenbaşy has three modern hotels: Türkmenbaşy Hotel, Charlak Hotel and the new Silk Road Hotel at the seaport, in addition to the old Soviet-era Hazar Hotel.

In recent years, the city has undergone large-scale reconstruction of its historic district, entrance roads and vital infrastructure. A new Turkish Park was built. By the end of 2012, Magtymguly Avenue had been completely renovated. The new route merged with the city's waterfront, Bahry Hazar, and from the west motorway junction at Balykçy Traffic Circle a dual carriageway leads westward out of the city along a dike across Soymonov Bay to Turkmenbashi Airport and to Awaza. In 2014, the Oilworkers Palace of Culture, which was built in 1951, was renovated.

The city is home of the Türkmendeňizderýaýollary Agency, part of the Government of Turkmenistan.

== Administrative divisions ==
As of July 2013, the city was divided into two boroughs (Turkmen: etrap): Awaza etraby (Avaza Borough) and Kenar etraby (Kenar Borough). However, on 9 November 2022, the borough of Kenar was formally abolished, leaving Türkmenbaşy with only one official borough (uly etrap), Awaza etraby.

Boroughs differ from ordinary municipal "districts" in that boroughs are led by a presidentially-appointed mayor (Turkmen: häkim), whereas ordinary municipal districts are subordinate to municipal authorities. Awaza etraby, an area of 9660 hectares, includes the Awaza national tourist zone, Turkmenbashi International Airport and a small residential area.

The abolished Kenar etraby, an area of 7262 hectares, included the main part of the city of Turkmenbashi and the territory of the former town of Kenar. It encompassed the Turkmenbashi International Seaport, including the Kenar Oil Loading Terminal as well as the Kenar Oil Storage and Loading Enterprise (Russian: Кенарское предприятие хранения и отгрузки нефтепродуктов, Turkmen: Kenar nebit önümlerini saklamak we iberiş kärhanasy).

== Geography ==
=== Climate ===
Türkmenbaşy has a cold desert climate (Köppen BWk), with hot summers and somewhat chilly winters. The average temperatures are 3 °C in January and 28 °C in July. With the 40°N traversing the city, summers are extremely warm for the latitude considering its maritime position. The average annual precipitation is 125 mm (5 in).

Climate data for Türkmenbaşy (1991–2020, extremes 1883-present)
Month	Jan	Feb	Mar	Apr	May	Jun	Jul	Aug	Sep	Oct	Nov	Dec	Year
Record high °C (°F)	20.7 (69.3)	23.3 (73.9)	29.7 (85.5)	36.0 (96.8)	40.7 (105.3)	43.5 (110.3)	45.6 (114.1)	44.5 (112.1)	43.5 (110.3)	33.4 (92.1)	28.1 (82.6)	24.6 (76.3)	45.6 (114.1)
Mean daily maximum °C (°F)	7.8 (46.0)	8.9 (48.0)	13.6 (56.5)	19.6 (67.3)	26.5 (79.7)	32.2 (90.0)	35.0 (95.0)	35.1 (95.2)	29.5 (85.1)	21.8 (71.2)	14.0 (57.2)	9.2 (48.6)	21.1 (70.0)
Daily mean °C (°F)	3.6 (38.5)	4.2 (39.6)	8.3 (46.9)	13.7 (56.7)	20.3 (68.5)	25.8 (78.4)	28.7 (83.7)	28.7 (83.7)	23.0 (73.4)	15.7 (60.3)	9.0 (48.2)	4.9 (40.8)	15.5 (59.9)
Mean daily minimum °C (°F)	0.2 (32.4)	0.0 (32.0)	3.6 (38.5)	8.5 (47.3)	14.3 (57.7)	19.5 (67.1)	22.7 (72.9)	22.5 (72.5)	17.0 (62.6)	10.1 (50.2)	4.6 (40.3)	1.3 (34.3)	10.4 (50.7)
Record low °C (°F)	−21.5 (−6.7)	−21.9 (−7.4)	−12.6 (9.3)	−2.6 (27.3)	0.9 (33.6)	6.6 (43.9)	14.1 (57.4)	11.0 (51.8)	3.3 (37.9)	−3.1 (26.4)	−13.6 (7.5)	−16.3 (2.7)	−21.9 (−7.4)
Average precipitation mm (inches)	11 (0.4)	13 (0.5)	20 (0.8)	17 (0.7)	7 (0.3)	2 (0.1)	2 (0.1)	2 (0.1)	4 (0.2)	12 (0.5)	19 (0.7)	11 (0.4)	124 (4.9)
Average rainy days	8	7	8	8	6	3	2	3	3	6	8	8	70
Average snowy days	4	4	1	0.1	0	0	0	0	0	0	0	2	11
Average relative humidity (%)	76	72	68	63	56	50	49	44	46	58	72	75	61
Mean monthly sunshine hours	136.6	139.0	172.6	227.0	303.2	347.0	344.0	330.2	294.1	228.8	161.9	124.0	2,808.4
Source 1: Pogoda.ru.net
Source 2: NOAA (sun, 1961–1990)

== Economy ==
Western Turkmenistan has major petroleum and natural gas reserves, and Turkmenistan's largest oil refinery is in Türkmenbaşy. The Turkmenbashi oil refinery had a refining capacity of more than 10 million tons of oil per year as of May 2016. The refinery produces a range of products, including unleaded gasoline, petroleum coke, asphalt, laundry detergent, hydro-treated diesel, and lubricating oil. The refinery is Turkmenistan's largest producer of liquid petroleum gas, accounting for two-thirds of total production with annual output of about 300 thousand tonnes.

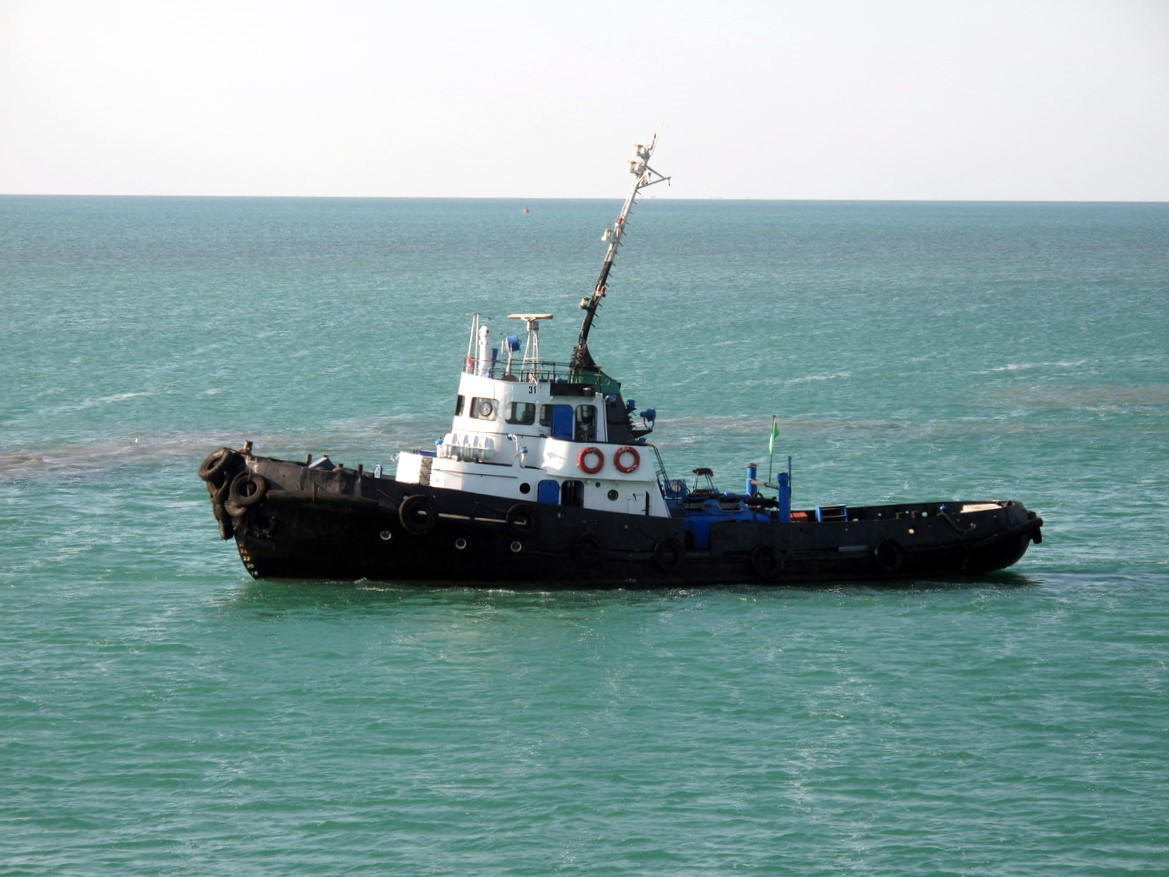
Turkmen ship at Turkmenbashi Port

Since May 2018, the Balkan Shipbuilding and Repair Yard has been operating at the Turkmenbashi International Seaport. The plant, the capacity of which allows the processing of 10,000 tons of steel per year, is calculated for the construction of 4–6 ships per year. The production facility is capable of performing maintenance and repair work on 20–30 ships, by processing 2000 tons of steel per year.

== Sights ==
- Museum of Regional History
- Gate to former Krasnovodsk fort
- Beaches
- Khazar Nature Reserve
- Natural History Museum

The central office of the State Archives of the Balkan Region is located in Türkmenbaşy.

== Religion ==
The majority of city's population, Turkmens, are Sunni Muslim.

=== Russian Orthodox Church ===
The Church of St. Michael the Archangel is a gift of the Astrakhan diocese of the Russian Orthodox Church. In 1895 it was moved to Krasnovodsk from a flooded peninsula Uzun Ada by Russian soldiers.

=== Armenian Apostolic Church ===
The church was built in 1903. It is currently non-functional and in need of a major renovation.

== Sports ==
The city contains Şagadam Stadium, which is home to the professional football club Şagadam FK.

Futsal clubs Deňizçi and TNGIZT from Türkmenbaşy play in the Turkmenistan Futsal League.

=== International sporting events ===
In 2014, for first time in its history, Turkmenistan hosted the PWA World Tour Windsurfing.

== Cellular ==
The city has one mobile operator : Altyn Asyr, implemented in 2007, which has a 4G technology network with LTE since 2010. The 4G network covers all areas of the city and the Turkmenbashi International Airport.

Internet access services and cable TV are provided by the operator Turkmentelecom. There is 1 internet cafe in the city.

== Education ==
Turkmenbashi Marine Secondary Vocational School of Türkmendeňizderýaýollary Agency prepares specialists for the needs of the sea and river transport of Turkmenistan. The term of study in accordance with the specialty is 2 or 2.5 years, on a paid basis.

== Culture ==
In the vicinity of the city of Turkmenbashi, the shooting of Soviet feature films Days of Eclipse by Alexander Sokurov, The Forty-First by Grigory Chukhray and Barkhan by Sanzhar Babayev, which takes place in the city of Barkhan.

=== Amusement park ===
Salkyn kenar is an amusement park located on the coast of Caspian Sea. The park covers an area of 2.7 hectares. This amusement park has over 30 attractions and many restaurants. It is a popular tourist attraction and visited by thousands of people every day. The park also serves as a concert venue.

== Transport ==
The public transport system and the relevant infrastructure in Türkmenbaşy is primarily managed by the Turkmenawtoulaglary Agency. Today, the city is served by an international airport, national rail services, municipal buses, minibuses, cabs, and bike lanes.

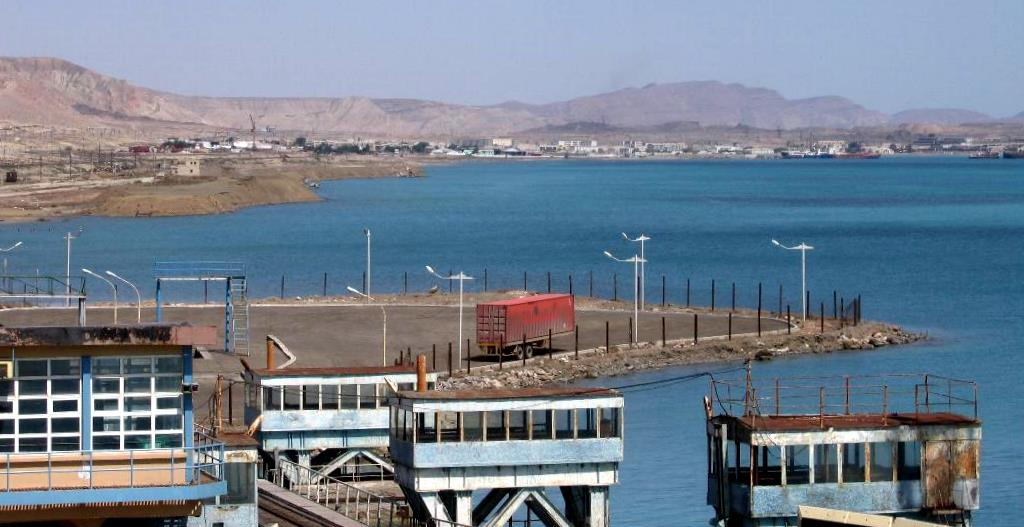
Caspian Sea at the Port of Türkmenbaşy

The city plays an important role as a transport junction, formed by its seaport with a ferry terminal, and the airport and railway station. The M37 highway links the seaport to points east. The P-18 highway runs west from the seaport to Awaza, then north to the border with Kazakhstan.

=== Seaport ===
Turkmenbashi International Seaport is Turkmenistan's major seaport and sea link to the West. Ferry service connects Türkmenbaşy to Baku, Azerbaijan, which is about 260 kilometers across the Caspian Sea. It is the western terminus of the Trans-Caspian railway, which connects the city to Turkmenistan's capital Ashgabat and points further east.

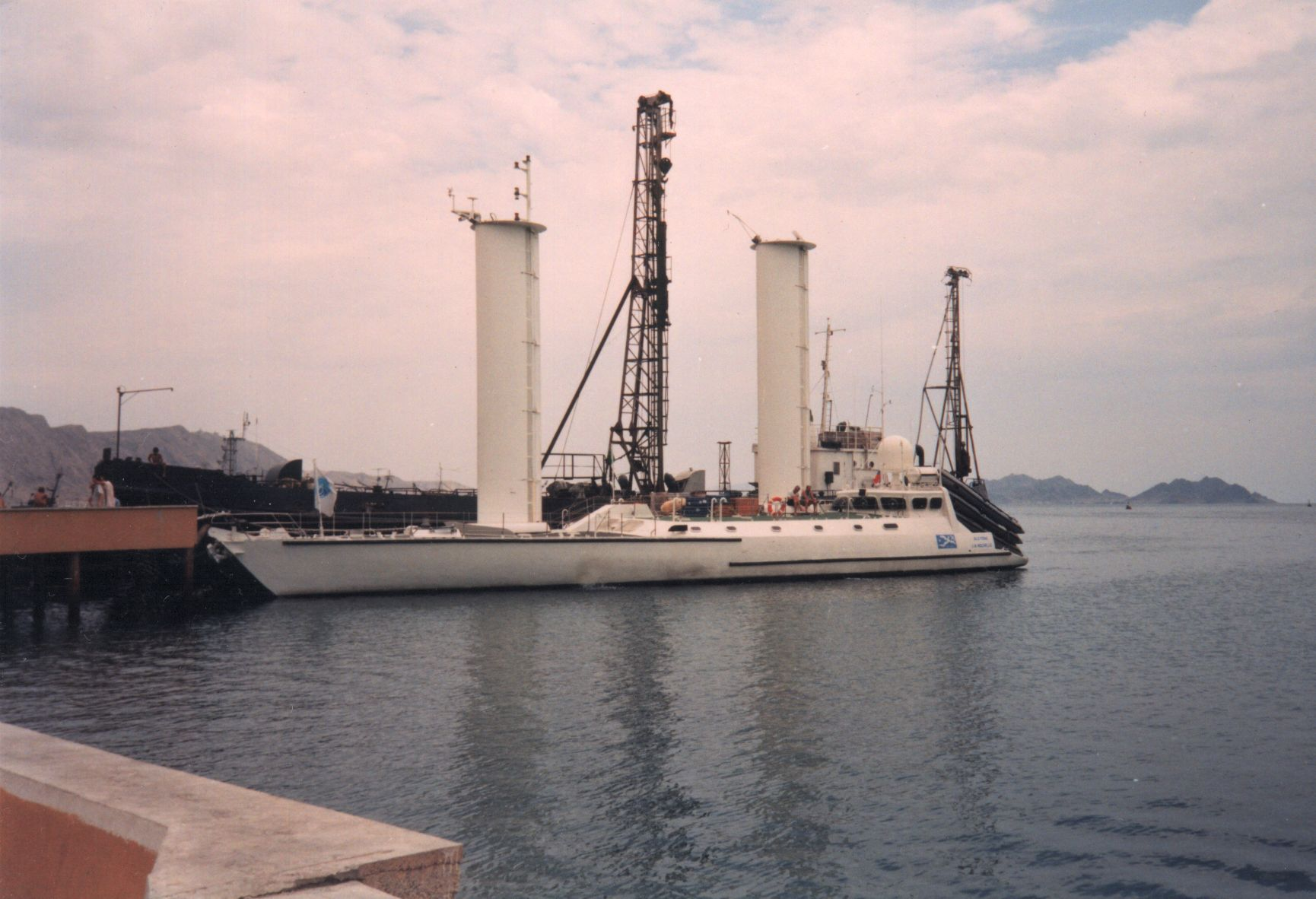
Vessel Alcyone in Port of Türkmenbaşy

In 1998, as part of its three-month expedition to the Caspian Sea, the Turkmenbashi International Seaport was visited by the Cousteau Society on the Alcyone ship.

As of 2021, passenger lines connect Türkmenbaşy with the Port of Baku in Baku, Azerbaijan and the Port of Olya in Olya, Russia.

In 2014, a sea passenger terminal for domestic routes was opened in the port. On the internal lines, the city is connected with Hazar and Gyzylsuw.

In 2018, a new modernized seaport was opened, the largest on the Caspian Sea. The area of the new port is over 1.3 km^{2}, and the total berth length is 3.6 km. The throughput capacity of the cargo terminal is up to 18 million tons per year.

=== Railway station ===
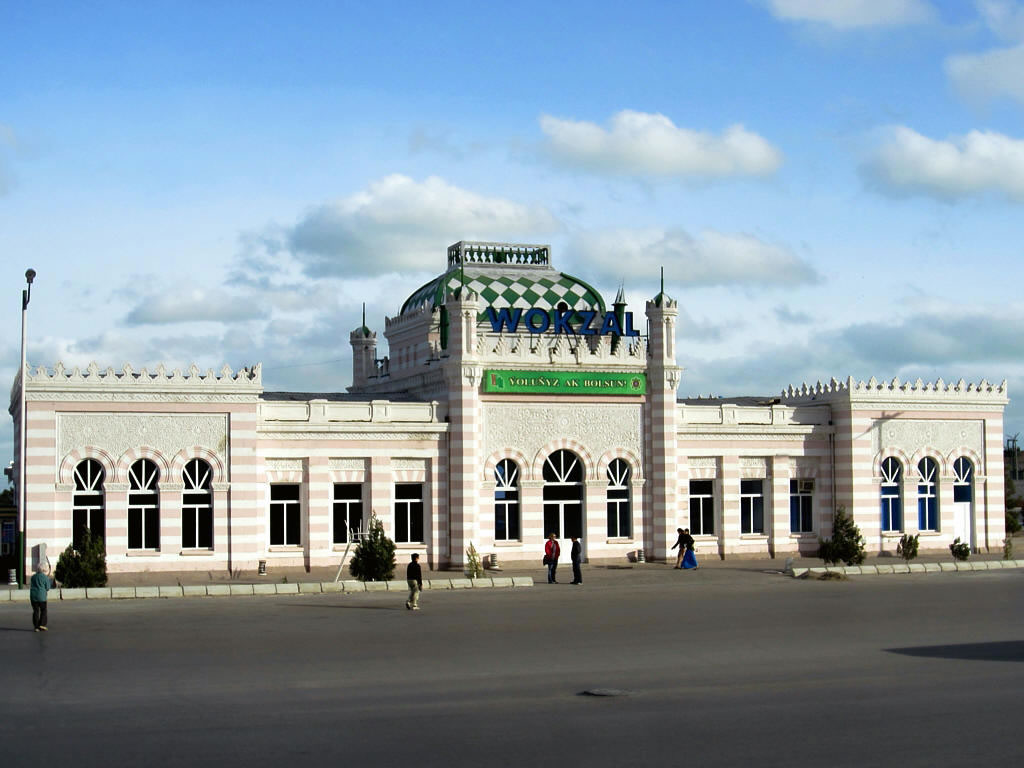
Turkmenbashi Railway Station

The Turkmenbashi railway station was built in 1895 by the architect Alexeï Leontievitch Benois. Railway station square is adjacent to the memorial to the soldiers who died during the Great Patriotic War. From Turkmenbashi, train No. 605/606 makes daily trips to Ashgabat.

=== Airport ===
Initially in 1940 the airport was located at the bottom of the plateau, near Krasnovodsk Hospital. During World War II it was transferred to the top of the plateau and the airfield was collocated with a Soviet Air Force base. In 2010 the airport was reconstructed and gained international status. It has two runways. Turkmenistan Airlines provides direct flights from Türkmenbaşy International Airport to Ashgabat, Daşoguz, Mary, Istanbul and Türkmenabat. The airport can be reached by bus or car from the city, taking approximately 10–15 minutes by car.

=== Buses ===
Turkmenbashi's bus network forms a crucial backbone of the city's transit system. For almost a decade, Hyundai Aero City buses of various modifications were serving the city.

The city is also connected to Ashgabat, Balkanabat and Garabogaz by bus.

== International relations ==
=== Consulates ===
Two consular offices are found in Türkmenbaşy.

- Consular Office of Russia
- Consulate of Kazakhstan

=== Twin towns – Sister cities ===
- Jūrmala, Latvia
- Astrakhan, Russia (2022)

== See also ==
- Cave of Dzhebel
