= Türkmenbaşy District =

District in Balkan Region, Turkmenistan

Türkmenbaşy District Türkmenbaşy etraby
- District
- Interactive map of Türkmenbaşy District
- Coordinates: 40°0′37″N 53°6′49″E
- Country: Turkmenistan
- Region: Balkan Region
- Administrative centre: Türkmenbaşy şäherçesi

Area
  - Total: 65,550 km^{2} (25,310 sq mi)

Population (2022)
  - Total: 34,119
  - Density: 0.5205/km^{2} (1.348/sq mi)
- Time zone: UTC+5 (+5)

Türkmenbaşy District (Turkmen: Türkmenbaşy etraby; formerly Krasnowodsk District) is a district in Balkan Region, western Turkmenistan. Its administrative centre is Türkmenbaşy şäherçesi, and according to the 2022 Turkmenistan census, it had a population of 34,119 inhabitants. The district has an industrial economy based on the mineral resources of Garabogazköl and has the Türkmenbaşy International Seaport on the Caspian Sea.

== Name ==
The Türkmenbaşy District was formerly known as the Krasnowodsk District. On 9 March 1993, it was renamed Türkmenbaşy after Saparmurat Niyazov, the President of Turkmenistan. The administrative centre, Jaňga, was renamed Türkmenbaşy şäherçesi at the same time.

== Administration ==
The administrative centre of the Türkmenbaşy District is Türkmenbaşy şäherçesi (formerly Jaňga). The district contains the city (şäherler) Garabogaz, six towns (şäherçeler): Akdaş, Belek, Guwlymaýak, Gyzylgaýa, Gyzylsuw, and Türkmenbaşy şäherçesi, and three village councils (geňeşlikler): Akguýy, Çagyl, and Goýmat.

== Demographics ==
Based on the 2022 Turkmenistan census, published by the State Committee for Statistics, Türkmenbaşy had a population of 34,119 inhabitants. The area of the district is 65,550 square kilometres (25,310 sq mi), meaning a population density of 0.52 inhabitants per square kilometre. The district had more males with 18,846 (55.2%), in comparison to 15,273 (44.8%) females and a mostly urban lifestyle with a majority of 27,386 (80.3%) inhabitants living in urban areas and 6,733 (19.7%) inhabitants living in rural areas.

According to the 2022 census, the district's largest urban settlements were Garabogaz, with 7,877 inhabitants, Türkmenbaşy şäherçesi, with 7,334, and Akdaş, with 6,750. Together, these three settlements accounted for 80.2% of the district's urban population.

== Economy ==
The industrial economy of the district includes chemical production based on the mineral resources of Garabogazköl. Industrial extraction of sodium sulfate in Garabogaz began in 1924, and the first chemical plant opened in 1929. Production subsequently expanded to include magnesium sulfate, magnesium chloride, bromine, and various mineral salts. Another major industrial facility in Garabogaz is the Garabogazkarbamid urea plant, built under a 2014 agreement between Türkmenhimiýa, Japan's Mitsubishi Corporation and Turkey's GAP İnşaat. Designed to produce 1.155 million tonnes of urea annually, the plant is intended primarily for export.

== Transport ==
Maritime transport infrastructure in the district includes the Türkmenbaşy International Seaport, as well as the port points of Garabogaz and Kiyanly on the Caspian Sea. The International Seaport was inaugurated on 2 May 2018 and includes passenger, ferry, container, bulk cargo, general cargo and polypropylene terminals. It has a cargo handling capacity of 17 million tonnes annually, excluding oil products. The Garabogaz port point, constructed between 1982 and 1986 and reconstructed in 2018, serves the Garabogazcarbamid industrial plant, while the Kiyanly port point provides facilities for passenger and cargo vessels.

In November 2025, a 354-metre road bridge across Garabogazköl was inaugurated as part of the international highway connecting Turkmenistan with Kazakhstan.

== Education ==
The Naval Institute of the Ministry of Defense of Turkmenistan, which provides higher education, was established in the territory of the Türkmenbaşy District in June 2010.
