= List of municipalities in Ahal Province =

Map of the five provinces of Turkmenistan. Ahal is highlighted in red.

This article is referencing as a list all lawfully recognized municipalities of Ahal Province, Turkmenistan. Since September 8, 2025, there are 253 municipalities in Ahal, including a city with district status, eight cities, 10 towns, and 234 villages.

In Turkmenistan, any administrative division, including municipalities, is designated by law and may be changed by decree by the Assembly of Turkmenistan, as stated by the 23rd article of the constitution. They all are referenced in a list rarely shared by the Turkmen government, yet available for consultation through the 2022 census.

Criticized by external observers, the census figures should be taken very carefully as they seem to overestimate the actual population of the country.

== Lists ==
Municipalities listed here are sorted by their administrative division, then by alphabetical order.

=== Cities ===
Cities with district status are bolded.

Name	Population (2022)	District
Änew	28,653	Ak bugdaý
Altyn asyr	13,660	Altyn asyr
**Arkadag**	567	**Arkadag**
Babadaýhan	13,440	Babadaýhan
Bäherden	37,588	Bäherden
Gökdepe	33,381	Gökdepe
Kaka	33,315	Kaka
Sarahs	31,269	Sarahs
Tejen	67,488	Tejen

=== Towns ===
Name	Population (2022)	District
Aba Annaýew		Arkadag
Bereketli zaman	1,429	Ak bugdaý
Berkarar	2,747	Ak bugdaý
Bokurdak	7,726	Ak bugdaý
Ýaşlyk	8,172	Ak bugdaý
Arçman	6,014	Bäherden
Yzgant	6,547	Gökdepe
Duşak	8,405	Kaka
Gaňňaly	3,580	Sarahs
Bagtyýarlyk	9,804	Tejen

=== Villages ===
Villages which hold the seat of their rural council are bolded.

Name	Population (2022)	District	Included in
**Bereket**	10,597	Ak bugdaý	Bereket geňeşligi
Borjakly	233	Ak bugdaý	Bereketli geňeşligi
**Bükri**	1,393	Ak bugdaý	Bereketli geňeşligi
Diňli	666	Ak bugdaý	Bereketli geňeşligi
Gamyşly	302	Ak bugdaý	Bereketli geňeşligi
Gyzyltakyr	269	Ak bugdaý	Bereketli geňeşligi
Kükürtli	212	Ak bugdaý	Bereketli geňeşligi
Sakarçäge	432	Ak bugdaý	Bereketli geňeşligi
Sözenli	278	Ak bugdaý	Bereketli geňeşligi
Gäwers	3,396	Ak bugdaý	Bereketli zaman
Gäwers bekedi	835	Ak bugdaý	Bereketli zaman
Bussy	201	Ak bugdaý	Bokurdak
Çalyş	878	Ak bugdaý	Bokurdak
Çürçüri	876	Ak bugdaý	Bokurdak
Dawaly	261	Ak bugdaý	Bokurdak
Düýeli	99	Ak bugdaý	Bokurdak
Garaberdi	33	Ak bugdaý	Bokurdak
Gargalaňdiňlisi	270	Ak bugdaý	Bokurdak
Garryçyrla	404	Ak bugdaý	Bokurdak
Garryja	274	Ak bugdaý	Bokurdak
Gazykly	226	Ak bugdaý	Bokurdak
Goşalar	23	Ak bugdaý	Bokurdak
Gowşakgyzyltakyr	430	Ak bugdaý	Bokurdak
Göbekli	60	Ak bugdaý	Bokurdak
Gujurly	125	Ak bugdaý	Bokurdak
Güneşli	52	Ak bugdaý	Bokurdak
Gyzylsakal	426	Ak bugdaý	Bokurdak
Hajyguly	75	Ak bugdaý	Bokurdak
Kelleli	110	Ak bugdaý	Bokurdak
Kerpiçli	7	Ak bugdaý	Bokurdak
Mollagurban	268	Ak bugdaý	Bokurdak
Oraz	404	Ak bugdaý	Bokurdak
Oýukly	194	Ak bugdaý	Bokurdak
Töwekgel	127	Ak bugdaý	Bokurdak
Ýerbent	2,561	Ak bugdaý	Bokurdak
**Bugdaýly**	2,479	Ak bugdaý	Bugdaýly geňeşligi
Saryk	1,017	Ak bugdaý	Bugdaýly geňeşligi
Tokaý hojalygy	331	Ak bugdaý	Bugdaýly geňeşligi
**Mekan**	2,178	Ak bugdaý	Burunojar geňeşligi
**Gämi**	18,148	Ak bugdaý	Gämi geňeşligi
Ýeketut	568	Ak bugdaý	Gämi geňeşligi
**Garagum**	1,492	Ak bugdaý	Garagum geňeşligi
**Magtymguly**	9,173	Ak bugdaý	Magtymguly adyndaky geňeşlik
**Döwletli mekan**		Ak bugdaý	Öňaldy geňeşligi
Gaplaň	252	Ak bugdaý	Öňaldy geňeşligi
Garadamak	183	Ak bugdaý	Öňaldy geňeşligi
Kepele		Ak bugdaý	Öňaldy geňeşligi
Kesikburun	154	Ak bugdaý	Öňaldy geňeşligi
Körçaý	249	Ak bugdaý	Öňaldy geňeşligi
Narly	200	Ak bugdaý	Öňaldy geňeşligi
Nazarly	762	Ak bugdaý	Öňaldy geňeşligi
Öňaldy	2,502	Ak bugdaý	Öňaldy geňeşligi
Toraňňyly, Ak bugdaý	686	Ak bugdaý	Öňaldy geňeşligi
Tozanly	782	Ak bugdaý	Öňaldy geňeşligi
**Parahat**	4,594	Ak bugdaý	Parahat geňeşligi
Bozköl	94	Ak bugdaý	Sähra geňeşligi
Çörli	386	Ak bugdaý	Sähra geňeşligi
Derýa	763	Ak bugdaý	Sähra geňeşligi
Gulangyrlan	912	Ak bugdaý	Sähra geňeşligi
Gypjak	74	Ak bugdaý	Sähra geňeşligi
Gysy	450	Ak bugdaý	Sähra geňeşligi
**Sähra**	791	Ak bugdaý	Sähra geňeşligi
Syzaly	63	Ak bugdaý	Sähra geňeşligi
Täzeoba	977	Ak bugdaý	Sähra geňeşligi
87-nji duralga	54	Ak bugdaý	Täzedurmuş geňeşligi
88-nji duralga	63	Ak bugdaý	Täzedurmuş geňeşligi
Garanur	214	Ak bugdaý	Täzedurmuş geňeşligi
Giňoý	62	Ak bugdaý	Täzedurmuş geňeşligi
Gyzylgöz	406	Ak bugdaý	Täzedurmuş geňeşligi
Söwütli	357	Ak bugdaý	Täzedurmuş geňeşligi
**Täzedurmuş**	6,945	Ak bugdaý	Täzedurmuş geňeşligi
Aksuw	474	Ak bugdaý	Ýaşlyk
Akýaýla	1,337	Ak bugdaý	Ýaşlyk
Balykçy	1,241	Ak bugdaý	Ýaşlyk
Ýaşlyk bekedi	419	Ak bugdaý	Ýaşlyk
**Ýaşyldepe**	6,563	Ak bugdaý	Ýaşyldepe geňeşligi
Ak altyn	593	Altyn asyr	Altyn asyr
Bugdaýly	448	Altyn asyr	Altyn asyr
Maldarçylyk	364	Altyn asyr	Altyn asyr
**Balykçy**	363	Altyn asyr	Balykçylyk geňeşligi
**Çäçe**	5,067	Altyn asyr	Çäçe geňeşligi
**Döwletli**	8,162	Altyn asyr	Döwletli geňeşligi
Göksüýri	192	Altyn asyr	Döwletli geňeşligi
Däneçilik	420	Altyn asyr	Gurban Durdy adyndaky geňeşlik
Galkynyş	520	Altyn asyr	Gurban Durdy adyndaky geňeşlik
**Gurban Durdy**	2,245	Altyn asyr	Gurban Durdy adyndaky geňeşlik
**Mäne**	4,877	Altyn asyr	Mäne geňeşligi
Lukman	781	Altyn asyr	Waharman geňeşligi
**Waharman**	1,877	Altyn asyr	Waharman geňeşligi
**Ak altyn**	8,936	Babadaýhan	Ak altyn geňeşligi
**Akwekil**	16,946	Babadaýhan	Akwekil geňeşligi
Çili	962	Babadaýhan	Akwekil geňeşligi
**Garawekil**	345	Babadaýhan	Garawekil geňeşligi
Garajaowlak	17,229	Babadaýhan	Garawekil geňeşligi
**Hasyl**	6,886	Babadaýhan	Hasyl geňeşligi
Götin	1,156	Babadaýhan	Täzeýol geňeşligi
**Täzeýol**	9,259	Babadaýhan	Täzeýol geňeşligi
**Ýarygökje**	9,897	Babadaýhan	Ýarygökje geňeşligi
Alty Garlyýew	972	Babadaýhan	Zähmet geňeşligi
Mamur	10,571	Babadaýhan	Zähmet geňeşligi
**Zähmet**	713	Babadaýhan	Zähmet geňeşligi
97-nji duralga	178	Bäherden	Akdepe geňeşligi
**Akdepe**	9,066	Bäherden	Akdepe geňeşligi
Arçman bekedi	1,860	Bäherden	Arçman
Keletdag	373	Bäherden	Arçman
**Bamy**	7,884	Bäherden	Bamy geňeşligi
Ymarat	658	Bäherden	Bamy geňeşligi
**Börme**	5,288	Bäherden	Börme geňeşligi
103-nji duralga	324	Bäherden	Börme geňeşligi
**Döwgala**	4,482	Bäherden	Döwgala geňeşligi
**Durun**	10,967	Bäherden	Durun geňeşligi
**Garagan**	5,788	Bäherden	Garagan geňeşligi
**Garawul**	8,235	Bäherden	Garawul geňeşligi
Könegümmez	1,064	Bäherden	Garawul geňeşligi
Atabeg	641	Bäherden	Kirpili geňeşligi
Hajyölen	143	Bäherden	Kirpili geňeşligi
**Kirpili**	1,322	Bäherden	Kirpili geňeşligi
Sözenlioýy	207	Bäherden	Kirpili geňeşligi
**Mürçe**	5,056	Bäherden	Mürçe geňeşligi
Etegoýy	79	Bäherden	Mürçe geňeşligi
Tagyoýy	76	Bäherden	Mürçe geňeşligi
**Nohur**	6,258	Bäherden	Nohur geňeşligi
Deşt	677	Bäherden	Saýwan geňeşligi
**Saýwan**	1,628	Bäherden	Saýwan geňeşligi
100-nji duralga	134	Bäherden	Sünçe geňeşligi
**Sünçe**	1,785	Bäherden	Sünçe geňeşligi
Kelete	2,582	Bäherden	Ýarajy geňeşligi
**Ýarajy**	6,052	Bäherden	Ýarajy geňeşligi
**Ahal**	16,025	Gökdepe	Ahal geňeşligi
Çyrla	96	Gökdepe	Ahal geňeşligi
Gatydüýp	233	Gökdepe	Ahal geňeşligi
Gorýa	70	Gökdepe	Ahal geňeşligi
Goşatakyr	58	Gökdepe	Ahal geňeşligi
Gutlyaýak	308	Gökdepe	Ahal geňeşligi
Ilek	136	Gökdepe	Ahal geňeşligi
Syplaňgyzyltakyr	104	Gökdepe	Ahal geňeşligi
War	63	Gökdepe	Ahal geňeşligi
**Akgoňur**	5,375	Gökdepe	Akgoňur geňeşligi
**Babaarap**	9,681	Gökdepe	Babaarap geňeşligi
Ataguýy	1,370	Gökdepe	Derweze geňeşligi
Böri	1,548	Gökdepe	Derweze geňeşligi
**Derweze**	2,166	Gökdepe	Derweze geňeşligi
**Hurmantgökje**	9,302	Gökdepe	Hurmantgökje geňeşligi
**Keleje**	7,260	Gökdepe	Keleje geňeşligi
Bowga	4,094	Gökdepe	Köpetdag geňeşligi
Bükri	2,316	Gökdepe	Köpetdag geňeşligi
**Köpetdagyň ýalkymy**		Gökdepe	Köpetdag geňeşligi
Nowata	892	Gökdepe	Köpetdag geňeşligi
Artykhoja	553	Gökdepe	Owadandepe geňeşligi
Nedir	1,396	Gökdepe	Owadandepe geňeşligi
**Nurly zaman**		Gökdepe	Owadandepe geňeşligi
Orazow	3,777	Gökdepe	Owadandepe geňeşligi
Sähra	129	Gökdepe	Owadandepe geňeşligi
Şapy	97	Gökdepe	Owadandepe geňeşligi
Talhanly	1,525	Gökdepe	Owadandepe geňeşligi
Ýandakly	159	Gökdepe	Owadandepe geňeşligi
Ajykäriz	1,239	Gökdepe	S.A. Nyýazow adyndaky geňeşlik
Galkynyş	108	Gökdepe	S.A. Nyýazow adyndaky geňeşlik
Garrykäriz	2,145	Gökdepe	S.A. Nyýazow adyndaky geňeşlik
**S.A. Nyýazow**	5,530	Gökdepe	S.A. Nyýazow adyndaky geňeşlik
**Şorgala**	4,432	Gökdepe	Şorgala geňeşligi
**Gökdepe**	9,150	Gökdepe	Tagan Baýramdurdyýew adyndaky geňeşlik
**Täze eýýam**	5,196	Gökdepe	Täze eýýam geňeşligi
Goňurajy	41	Gökdepe	Türkmenistan geňeşligi
Orazsähet	89	Gökdepe	Türkmenistan geňeşligi
**Türkmenistan**	7,666	Gökdepe	Türkmenistan geňeşligi
Şähridag	318	Gökdepe	Ýaňgala geňeşligi
Sekizýap	1,005	Gökdepe	Ýaňgala geňeşligi
**Ýaňgala**	8,657	Gökdepe	Ýaňgala geňeşligi
Çaran	370	Gökdepe	Yzgant
Garaajy	364	Gökdepe	Yzgant
Mämmetýar	1,184	Gökdepe	Yzgant
Sowma	324	Gökdepe	Yzgant
**Arapgala**	4,125	Kaka	Arapgala geňeşligi
**Artyk**	2,466	Kaka	Artyk geňeşligi
Şükür bagşy	12,136	Kaka	Duşak
**Garahan**	1,832	Kaka	Garahan geňeşligi
**Bagtly zamana**		Kaka	Gowşut geňeşligi
Gowşut	7,881	Kaka	Gowşut geňeşligi
Gowşut bekedi	822	Kaka	Gowşut geňeşligi
**Gozgan**	2,749	Kaka	Gozgan geňeşligi
**Harçiňňan**	1,412	Kaka	Harçiňňan geňeşligi
Hywaabat	444	Kaka	Kaka
**Kürengala**	1,587	Kaka	Kürengala geňeşligi
Soltandeşt	854	Kaka	Kürengala geňeşligi
Bükriölen	17	Kaka	Mehinli geňeşligi
Bulanyk	105	Kaka	Mehinli geňeşligi
Haşşan		Kaka	Mehinli geňeşligi
Hojameňli	101	Kaka	Mehinli geňeşligi
Hümmetli	30	Kaka	Mehinli geňeşligi
Köpguýy	150	Kaka	Mehinli geňeşligi
Kümeli	113	Kaka	Mehinli geňeşligi
Kyrkguýy	75	Kaka	Mehinli geňeşligi
**Mehinli**	5,089	Kaka	Mehinli geňeşligi
**Alam**	2,169	Sarahs	Alam geňeşligi
**Aşgabat**	4,470	Sarahs	Aşgabat geňeşligi
**Ata**	3,701	Sarahs	Ata geňeşligi
**Gökhan**	2,635	Sarahs	Bagtyýarlyk geňeşligi
Watan	443	Sarahs	Bagtyýarlyk geňeşligi
Zähmet	179	Sarahs	Bagtyýarlyk geňeşligi
Çalja	701	Sarahs	Galkynyş geňeşligi
**Galkynyş**	1,988	Sarahs	Galkynyş geňeşligi
Gözli ata	52	Sarahs	Galkynyş geňeşligi
Salyr	3,663	Sarahs	Galkynyş geňeşligi
Tekehan	1,175	Sarahs	Galkynyş geňeşligi
**Hanýap**	2,282	Sarahs	Hanýap geňeşligi
**Agzybirlik**	3,813	Sarahs	Kiçiaga geňeşligi
Berkarar	4,675	Sarahs	Kiçiaga geňeşligi
Oraz salyr	1,194	Sarahs	Kiçiaga geňeşligi
Rysgally	3,681	Sarahs	Kiçiaga geňeşligi
Ak altyn	2,837	Sarahs	Parahatçylyk geňeşligi
**Parahatçylyk**	2,229	Sarahs	Parahatçylyk geňeşligi
Ýeňiş	366	Sarahs	Parahatçylyk geňeşligi
**Ýalawaç**	3,541	Sarahs	Ýalawaç geňeşligi
**Adalat**	320	Tejen	Adalat geňeşligi
Ajyköl	416	Tejen	Adalat geňeşligi
Akmolla	467	Tejen	Adalat geňeşligi
Böwrideşik	214	Tejen	Adalat geňeşligi
Mürzeçyrla	390	Tejen	Adalat geňeşligi
**Ezizhan**	9,023	Tejen	Agalaň geňeşligi
**Babadaýhan**	8,070	Tejen	Babadaýhan geňeşligi
**Berdi Kerbabaýew**	4,576	Tejen	Berdi Kerbabaýew adyndaky geňeşlik
**Birleşik**	8,092	Tejen	Birleşik geňeşligi
**Bitaraplyk**	7,180	Tejen	Bitaraplyk geňeşligi
Gowkyzereň pagta bazasy	1,065	Tejen	Bitaraplyk geňeşligi
74-nji duralga	106	Tejen	Garaşsyzlyk geňeşligi
**Garaşsyzlyk**	8,673	Tejen	Garaşsyzlyk geňeşligi
Takyr	293	Tejen	Garaşsyzlyk geňeşligi
**Garryçyrla**	7,405	Tejen	Garryçyrla geňeşligi
**Göniamaşa**	7,046	Tejen	Göniamaşa geňeşligi
**Täzeoba**	8,614	Tejen	Täzeoba geňeşligi
Seleňli	1,326	Tejen	Zaman geňeşligi
Serdar	633	Tejen	Zaman geňeşligi
**Zaman**	1,498	Tejen	Zaman geňeşligi

== Former settlements ==
- Bagabat
- Birleşik
- Döwletabat
- Garaman
- Gorjaw
- Kasamly jülge

== See also ==
- Cities of Turkmenistan
- Towns of Turkmenistan
- List of cities, towns and villages in Turkmenistan
- Demographics of Turkmenistan
