= Mäne, Turkmenistan =

Mäne Mäne obasy
- Village
- Location in Turkmenistan
- Coordinates: 36°52′27″N 60°24′22″E
- Country: Turkmenistan
- Province: Ahal Province
- District: Altyn asyr District
- Rural council: Mäne geňeşligi

Population (2022 official census)
  - Total: 4,877
- Time zone: UTC+5

Mäne, known in Russian as Meana ("Меана"), is a village not far from the Iranian border located in Altyn asyr District, Ahal Province, Turkmenistan. The eleventh century Abu Said Meikhene Mausoleum, dedicated to Abū-Sa'īd Abul-Khayr lies to the northwest. The village gives its name, along with the village of Çäçe, to the Mäne-Çäçe Sanctuary, a protected area. In 2022, the village had a population of 4,877 people.

== History ==
As Altyn asyr District was briefly abolished on 5 January 2018, the village was transferred to Kaka District along with the village of Çäçe. Altyn asyr District was re-established on 19 September 2025, and both villages were transferred back.

== Geography ==
The village is accessed via a road from the M37 highway at Duşak in the northwest, south of Tejen. The Iranian border villages of Qaratigan and Sanganeh lie to the southwest on the mountainous border. The land immediately to the north of the village is fertile, with fields under cultivation.

== Landmarks ==
The eleventh century Abu Said Meikhene Mausoleum lies to the northwest.

Two important Neolithic and Chalcolithic period settlements have been excavated in the area of Miana.

Altyn Depe (3200 to 2400 BCE), a Neolithic settlement extending into the Bronze Age, was discovered by Boris Kuftin near the village.

Monjukli Depe, starting about 6200 BC, was discovered more recently, in 1959.

== See also ==
- List of municipalities in Ahal Province
