= Altyn Asyr, Turkmenistan =

Altyn asyr Altyn asyr şäheri
- City
- Location in Turkmenistan
- Coordinates: 37°16′54″N 60°42′16″E
- Country: Turkmenistan
- Region: Ahal Province
- District: Altyn asyr District

Population (2022 official census)
  - City: 15,065
  - Urban: 13,660
  - Rural: 1,405
- Time zone: UTC+5 (+5)

Altyn asyr, previously known as sovkhoz Tejen (in Russian: совхоз Теджен) or Bereket, is a city and capital of Altyn asyr District, Ahal Province, Turkmenistan. Its main economic activity is cotton farming. In 2022, it had a population of 13,660 people.

== Etymology ==
The words altyn asyr mean "golden age" in Turkmen. The phrase is used to describe the post-Soviet era of Turkmen independence, particularly during the reign of President Saparmurat Niyazov.

== History ==
The municipality was founded on the basis of the Soviet-era cotton-producing "Tejen" state farm. Following independence, state and collective farms were redesignated villages and towns. The Tejen State Farm (sovkhoz) was designated a town and initially named Bereket ("fertile"). In 2000 it was renamed Altyn asyr ("Golden Age") and made the administrative center of a new district of the same name formed from parts of Sarahs District, Tejen District, and Kaka District. On 28 April 2016, Altyn asyr was granted a city-in-a-district status by parliamentary decree. The Altyn asyr District was shortly abolished by act of Parliament on 5 January 2018 and its territory was transferred to Tejen, Kaka, and Sarahs Districts. The city of Altyn asyr was reassigned to Tejen District. It is reestablished on 19 September 2025.

=== People associated with Altyn asyr ===
A director of the former state farm, Çary Hanamow (in Russian: Чары Ханамов), wrote a memoir of his life and times. Hanamov was recognized as a Hero of Socialist Labor in 1976. Hanamov's son, Nurmuhammet Ç. Hanamow, served as independent Turkmenistan's ambassador to Turkey and subsequently went into exile as an opposition leader.

== Transportation ==
Altyn asyr is located between Turkmenistan's main east–west motor route, the M37 highway, and the P-7 highway that links Tejen and Sarahs.

== Appearance in motion picture ==
In 1969, sovkhoz Tejen was the subject of cinematography.

== Dependencies ==
Altyn asyr has three dependent villages:

Altyn asyr, city:

- Ak altyn, village
- Bugdaýly, village
- Maldarçylyk, village
