= Abiward =

Ancient Sassanid city

- Abiwerd, Abiwert, Abiverd, Abivard, Abiourd, Bawerd, Bivard
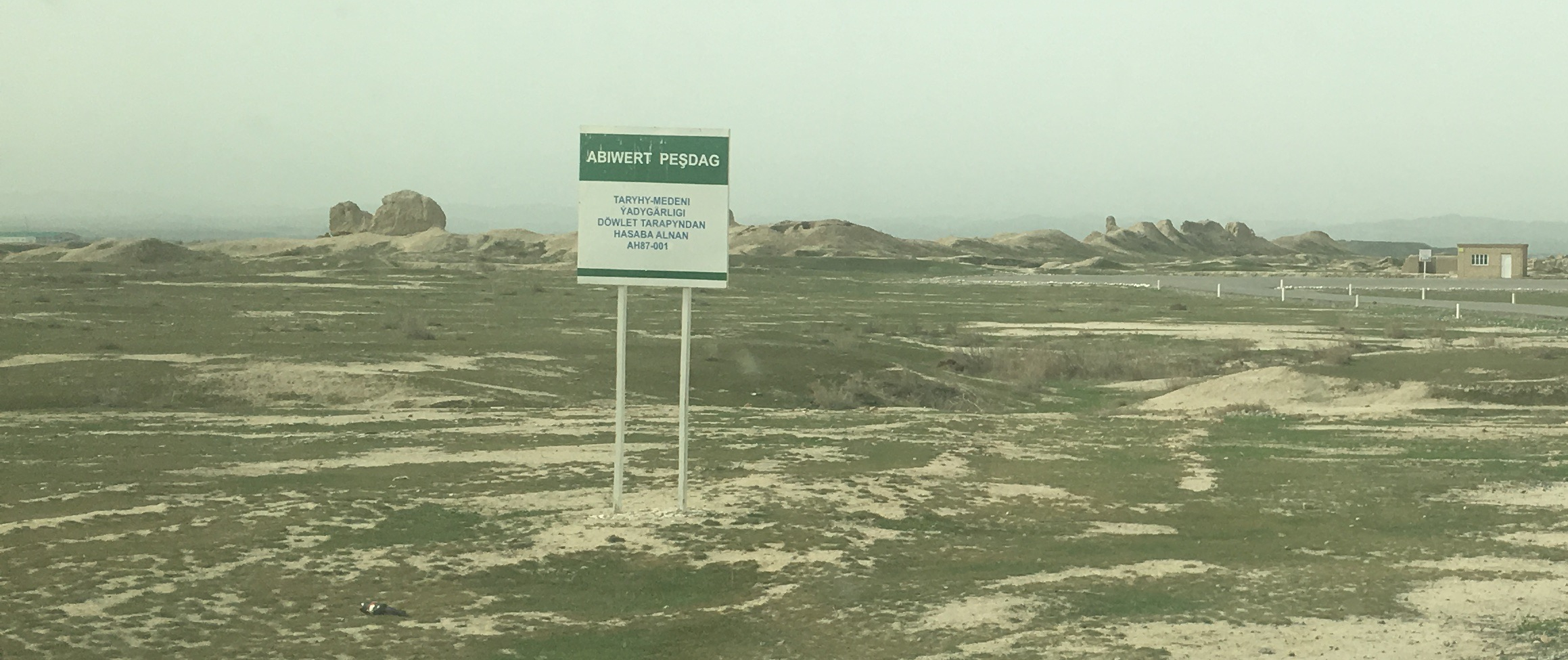
- Ruins of Abiward (Turkmen: Abiwert), Ahal Province, Turkmenistan
- Interactive map of Abiward
- 37°23′28″N 59°34′0″E
- Location: Kaka District, Ahal Region, Turkmenistan

Site notes
- Condition: Ruined
- Public access: yes

Abiward or Abi-ward, was an ancient Sasanian city in modern-day Turkmenistan. Archaeological excavations at the ancient city of Abiward have been made in the 20th century about 8 km west of Kaka (Russian: Каахка) in an area of 12,000 m^{2}. The central tell is 60 feet high and 700 feet round.

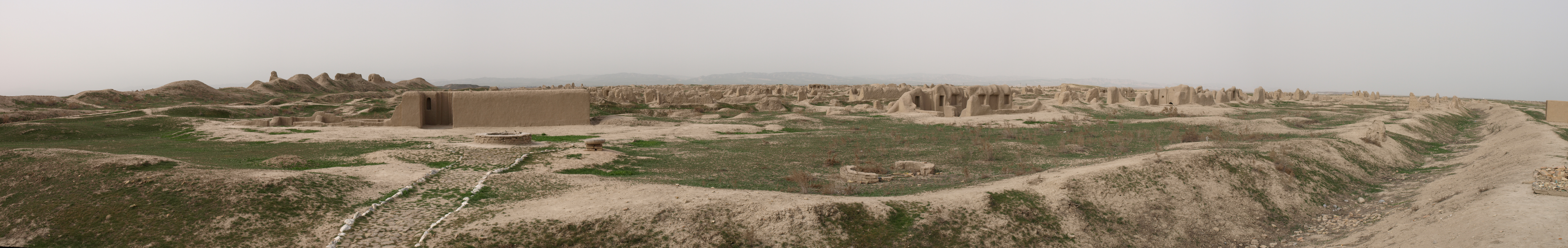
Panorama of the Abiward archeological site

== History ==
It was located in the northern part of the historical region known as Greater Khorasan. Serving as a border town, it formed part of a chain of frontier settlements established by the rulers of ancient Iran to prevent raids by nomads from Inner Asia. The area of present-day Ahal Region where Abiward, along with the cities of Nisa and Serakhs, was situated was known as Etek.

Archaeological research at the site began in the 20th century.

In September 2026, a new season of excavations and preventive conservation was launched at the Abiverd State Historical and Cultural Reserve. The works focused on the 11th-century Juma Mosque, located in the western sector of the fortification complex. The mosque had completely collapsed in the mid-19th century due to seismic activity and human factors. During the 2026 field season, archaeologists located the foundation bases and cleared the supporting pylons of the mosque's monumental portal (peştak), revealing complex medieval engineering and decorative brickwork.

== Description ==
Archaeological excavations of the ancient city were conducted only in the 20th century, approximately 8 km east of the Kaka railway station (part of the Trans-Caspian Railway between Ashgabat and Merv). The total area of the excavations covered 12,000 m². The site consists of several mounds and elevations identified as former settlements. The central mound rises to a height of 30 m with a circumference of approximately 350 m.

Only a few historical sources mention the name Abiward itself (such as Al-Muqaddasi and the Hudud al-'Alam). They note only its "fairly developed agriculture" and the "warlike character of the local population, which was undoubtedly influenced by its function as a border town".

It is linked to the modern city of Dargaz in Iran; near Abiward was the Bandian fire temple.

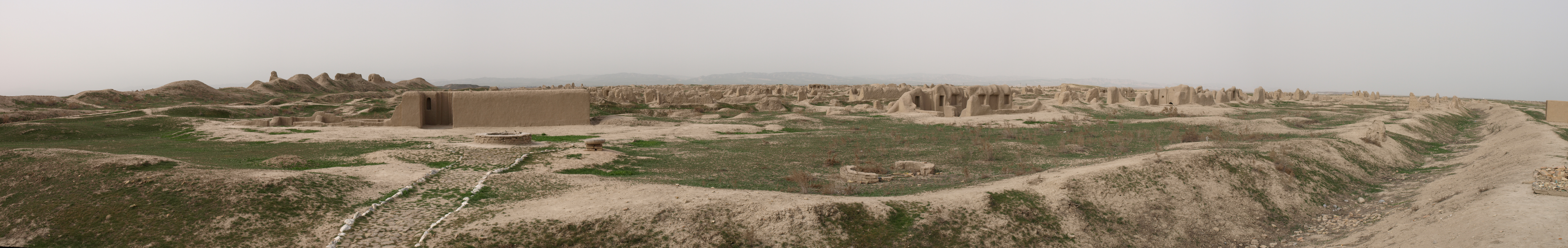
Panorama of Abiward
