= Ýaşlyk, Ak bugdaý =

Ýaşlyk Ýaşlyk şäherçesi
- Town
- Location in Turkmenistan
- Coordinates: 37°46′46″N 58°53′23″E
- Country: Turkmenistan
- Province: Ahal Province
- District: Ak bugdaý District

Population (2022 official census)
  - Town: 11,643
  - Urban: 8,172
  - Rural: 3,471
- Time zone: UTC+5

Ýaşlyk, formerly known as PMK-16 (in Russian: ПМК-16), is a town in Ahal Province, Turkmenistan. It is located circa 35 km east of Änew and 50 km east of Ashgabat. It is served by the 85th stop of the Trans-Caspian railway, which is now located within the village of Ýaşlyk bekedi. In 2022, the town had a population of 8,172 people.

== Etymology ==
In Turkmen, the word "Ýaşlyk" roughly translates to "Youth."

The former name of town, ПМК-16, is the abbreviation for Передвижная Механизированная Колонна 16, which translates to Mobile Motorized Division 16.

== History ==
On 14 January 2021, an AW109 of the State Border Service of Turkmenistan crashed near Ýaşlyk in Ahal Province, Turkmenistan. The aircraft reportedly collided with a transmission tower because of bad weather conditions, killing three border guards, including an officer.

On 8 May 2024, President Serdar Berdimuhamedow unveiled a new wastewater treatment plant with a flow capacity of 30,000 cubic meter per day.

== Administrative divisions ==
The town of Ýaşlyk has four villages under its jurisdictions:

- Ýaşlyk, town
  - Aksuw, village
  - Akýaýla, village
  - Balykçy, village
  - Ýaşlyk bekedi, village

== See also ==
- List of municipalities in Ahal Province
- Towns of Turkmenistan
