= Çarymyrat Kurbanow =

Turkmen football referee (born 1977)

- Full name: Çarymyrat Kurbanow
- Born: 5 December 1977 (age 48); Bäherden, Turkmen SSR, Soviet Union

Domestic
Years	League	Role

International
Years	League	Role
2002–2024	FIFA listed	Referee

Charymurat Kurbanov (born 12.05.1977) is a Turkmenian former professional football referee. He has been a full international for FIFA since 2003. and has refereed in some AFC Cup and AFC Champions League matches. Head of the Refereeing Department of the Football Federation of Turkmenistan.

== Refereeing career ==
Charymurat Kurbanov was born on December 5, 1977, in the city of Bäherden. Graduated National Institute of Sports and Tourism of Turkmenistan in 1994. He is fluent in Turkmen, English and Russian.

Since 2002, Kurbanov began officiating international matches and, over his career, refereed more than 700 games as the main referee.

Throughout his career, which spanned more than 20 years, Kurbanov officiated World Cup qualifiers, international tournaments such as the Turkmenistan President's Cup, the AFC Cup, the AFC President's Cup, international friendly matches, and the Asian Games. Regionally, he officiated CAFA Championship matches and, in Turkmenistan, the Ýokary Liga, the Turkmenistan Cup, and the Turkmenistan Super Cup.

On May 14, 2024, in his farewell match as the main referee, Kurbanov led the officiating team during the 15th round of Turkmenistan's top league between FC Ahal and FC Nebitchi (4:0).

== Later career ==
As of December 2024, Kurbanov serves as the Head of the Refereeing Department of the Football Federation of Turkmenistan and as an instructor for CAFA.
