= Ýerbent =

Ýerbent Ýerbent obasy
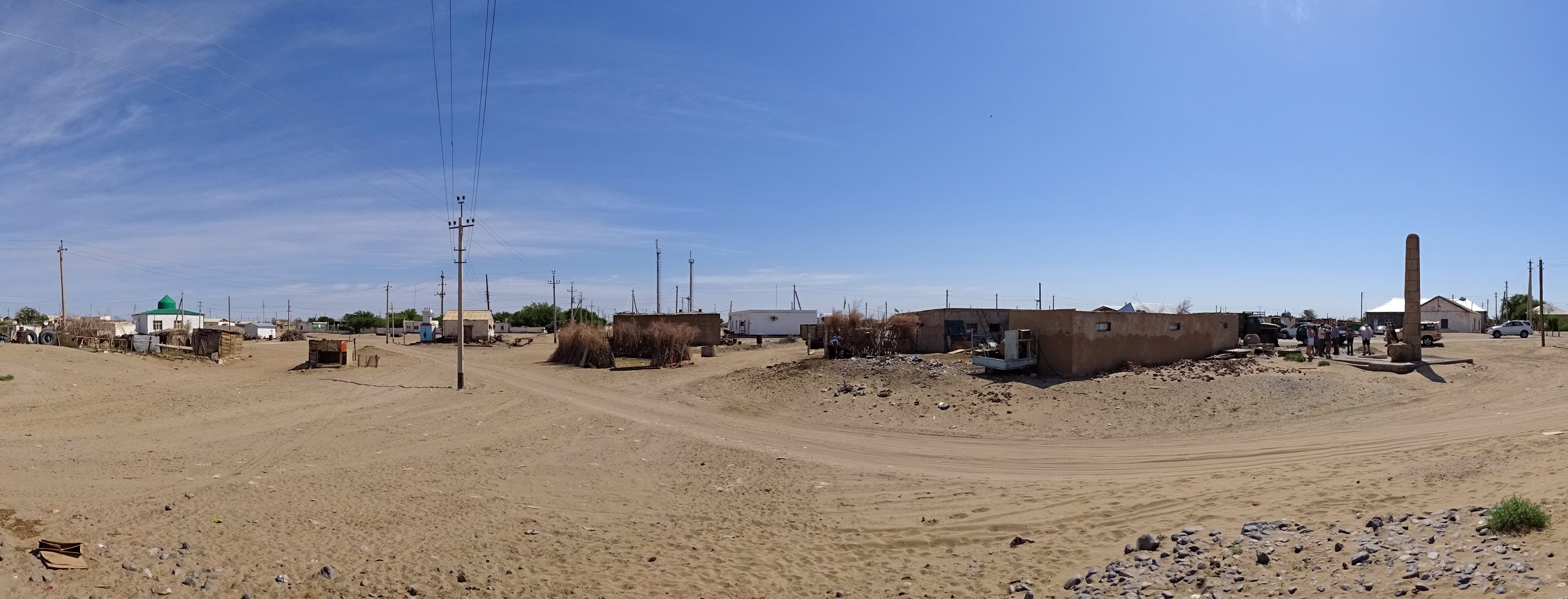
- A panorama from the entrance to the village of Ýerbent. On the right side of the photo a group of tourists standing next to the Basmachi Revolt monument can be seen.

- Location in Turkmenistan
- Coordinates: 39°18′47″N 58°35′46″E
- Country: Turkmenistan
- Province: Ahal Province
- District: Ak bugdaý District
- Town: Bokurdak

Population (2022 official census)
  - Total: 2,561
- Time zone: UTC+05:00 (TMT)
  - Summer (DST): UTC+05:00 (not observed)

Ýerbent, also known in Russian as Erbent ("Ербент"), is a village in Ahal Province in central Turkmenistan. The village is located in the Garagum Desert and is the second largest settlement on the road between Aşgabat and Daşoguz, which are located near the southern and northern border of the country respectively. In 2022, it had a population of 2,561 people. Ýerbent is surbordinate to the town of Bokurdak.

== Overview ==
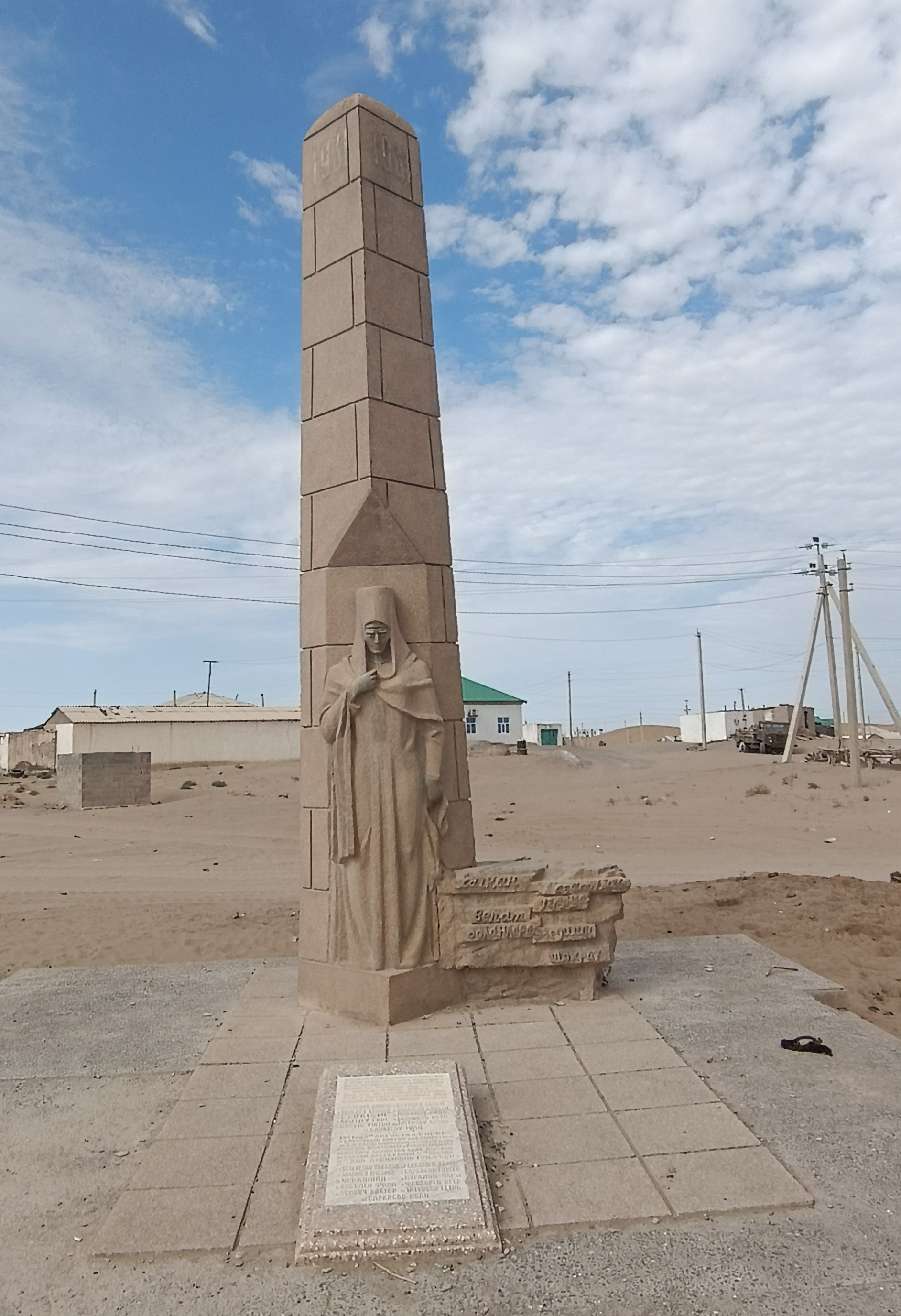
Monument for 11 red armists

The village-scape primarily consists of single-story buildings with adjacent yurts. A pastoral economy has resulted in the desertification of surrounding areas.

The village remains a popular destination aimed at providing tourists with an "authentic experience" of life in the Garagum Desert. A Soviet-era monument in the village center—featuring a Turkmen lady with a hung head—commemorates the death of 11 men who fell during the 1931 Basmachi Revolt in their quest of ensuring the "triumph of socialism, realization of dictatorship of the proletariat, and collectivization of agriculture."

== Climate ==
Like most of Turkmenistan, Ýerbent has a continental cold desert climate (BWk according to the Köppen climate classification) with cold winters and very hot and sunny summers. The village has an annual average temperature of 16.3 °C (61.3 °F). July is the hottest month, with a daily mean of 32.4 °C (90.3 °F) and an average high of 39.1 °C (102.4 °F). January is the coldest month, with a daily mean of 0.1 °C (32.2 °F) and an average low of −3.9 °C (25.0 °F).

Ýerbent's location in the middle of the Garagum Desert means it is very dry throughout the year, although winter and spring are slightly wetter and summer is especially dry. Ýerbent receives 119 mm (4.7 in) of precipitation in total, spread out over an average of 42 days per year. Ýerbent is also sunny year-round, receiving over 3000 hours of sunshine annually on average, with July being the sunniest month and summer being the sunniest season. Humidity is lower in the summer than in the winter, dropping as low as 25% in August. However, it rises to 74% in December.

Climate data for Ýerbent (1991-2020)
Month	Jan	Feb	Mar	Apr	May	Jun	Jul	Aug	Sep	Oct	Nov	Dec	Year
Mean daily maximum °C (°F)	5.5 (41.9)	8.7 (47.7)	15.9 (60.6)	24.5 (76.1)	31.4 (88.5)	37.0 (98.6)	39.1 (102.4)	37.2 (99.0)	31.6 (88.9)	22.7 (72.9)	15.2 (59.4)	7.9 (46.2)	23.1 (73.6)
Daily mean °C (°F)	2.1 (35.8)	4.5 (40.1)	10.8 (51.4)	18.1 (64.6)	25.1 (77.2)	30.7 (87.3)	33.1 (91.6)	31.2 (88.2)	24.7 (76.5)	16.3 (61.3)	8.4 (47.1)	3.1 (37.6)	17.3 (63.1)
Mean daily minimum °C (°F)	−3.9 (25.0)	−2.0 (28.4)	4.0 (39.2)	11.2 (52.2)	16.9 (62.4)	22.0 (71.6)	24.6 (76.3)	21.8 (71.2)	15.8 (60.4)	8.3 (46.9)	3.1 (37.6)	−1.3 (29.7)	10.0 (50.0)
Average precipitation mm (inches)	8.4 (0.33)	18.1 (0.71)	22.3 (0.88)	17.7 (0.70)	8.7 (0.34)	2.3 (0.09)	1.2 (0.05)	0.7 (0.03)	2.1 (0.08)	5.6 (0.22)	10.3 (0.41)	9.1 (0.36)	106.5 (4.19)
Average precipitation days (≥ 1.0 mm)	7.3	13.6	12.5	10.7	6.8	2.3	1.1	0.4	1.3	4.4	7.7	8.2	76.2
Average relative humidity (%)	73	63	54	46	33	26	26	25	30	43	59	74	46
Mean monthly sunshine hours	130.2	154.3	193.8	229.7	292.6	346.6	365.9	354.1	301.6	249.3	172.7	118.2	2,908.9
Source: NOAA (mean maximum, mean minimum, humidity 1961-1990)

== See also ==
- Garagum Desert
- Derweze, another small town along the same highway in the Garagum Desert.
- Darvaza gas crater
- Repetek Biosphere State Reserve
