= Yzgant =

Yzgant Yzgant şäherçesi
- Town
- Location in Turkmenistan
- Coordinates: 38°10′57″N 58°06′48″E
- Country: Turkmenistan
- Province: Ahal Province
- District: Gökdepe District

Population (2022 official census)
  - Town: 8,789
  - Urban: 6,547
  - Rural: 2 242
- Time zone: UTC+5

Yzgant is a town in Ahal Province, Turkmenistan. It is located circa 15 km east of Gökdepe, 10 km north of Arkadag, and 35 km west of Ashgabat. In 2022, it had a population of 6,547 people.

== History ==
On 10 October 2012, the cultural center of the village of Yzgant is named after Mälikguly Berdimuhammedow, the father of President Gurbanguly Berdimuhamedow.

On 26 April 2016, the villages of Yzgant and Azat Türkmenistan were merged into a single municipality, creating the town of Yzgant.

== Administrative subdivisions ==
Yzgant has four villages under its jurisdiction:

- Yzgant, town
  - Çaran, village
  - Garaajy, village
  - Mämmetýar, village
  - Sowma, village

== Culture ==
=== People born in Yzgant ===
- Kel bagşy, (Annaberdi Aýdogdi ogly) born circa 1850, composer, poet, and player of dutar
- Berdimuhammed Annaýew, born 1904, teacher and veteran of the Great Patriotic War. He was the grandfather of Gurbanguly Berdimuhamedow, the second President of Turkmenistan

== See also ==
- List of municipalities in Ahal Province
- Towns of Turkmenistan
