= Ak Ishan =

Shrine in Turkmenistan

Ak Ishan is a shrine in the Ahal Region of Turkmenistan. It is one of the most popular pilgrimage-sites in the country.

Ak Ishan is located 140 km west of Ashgabat. Ak Ishan is a popular place for worship also because the sanctuary is located 1.5 km from the famous balneological resort Archman. Patients of this resort tend to make a pilgrimage to the holy place.
