= Altyn asyr District =

Altyn asyr District Altyn asyr etraby
- District
- Interactive map of Altyn asyr District
- Coordinates: 37°16′53.5″N 60°42′15.7″E
- Country: Turkmenistan
- Province: Ahal Province
- Capital: Altyn asyr
- Second establishment: 19 September 2025

Area
  - District: 605,755 ha (1,496,850 acres)

Population (2022 official census)
  - District: 39,569
  - Density: 6.532/km^{2} (16.92/sq mi)
  - Urban: 13,660
  - Rural: 25,909
- Time zone: UTC+5

Altyn asyr District is a district in Ahal Province, Turkmenistan. It is located between Kaka, Tejen, Sarahs districts and Mary Province. Its capital city is Altyn asyr. According to 2022 census, its constituencies had a total population of 39,569 people.

== Etymology ==
The district borrows the name of its capital city, Altyn asyr, which is made of two words: "Altyn," which translates to "Gold," and "Asyr," which means "Era." The whole name translates to "Golden age."

== History ==
On 5 January 2018, Altyn asyr District was abolished by decree. 307,903 hectares were transferred to Kaka District, 26,700 hectares to Sarahs District, and 271,152 hectares to Tejen District. On 19 September 2025, the district was re-established and all changes were reverted.

== Administrative Subdivisions ==
Altyn asyr District includes seven third-level subdivisions, one city and six rural councils. Those subdivisions include 13 villages:

=== Cities ===
- Altyn asyr, including three villages

=== Towns ===
- None

=== Rural Councils ===
- Balykçylyk, including one village
- Çäçe, including one village
- Döwletli, including two villages
- Gurban Durdy, including three villages
- Mäne, including one village
- Waharman, including two villages

== See also ==
- Altyn asyr
- Districts of Turkmenistan
