= Darvaza =

Derweze Derweze obasy
- Location in Turkmenistan
- Coordinates: 40.09871853378001°N 58.34812141283926°E
- Country: Turkmenistan
- Province: Ahal Province
- District: Gökdepe District
- Rural council: Derweze geňeşligi

Population (2022 official census)
  - Total: 2,166
- Time zone: UTC+5

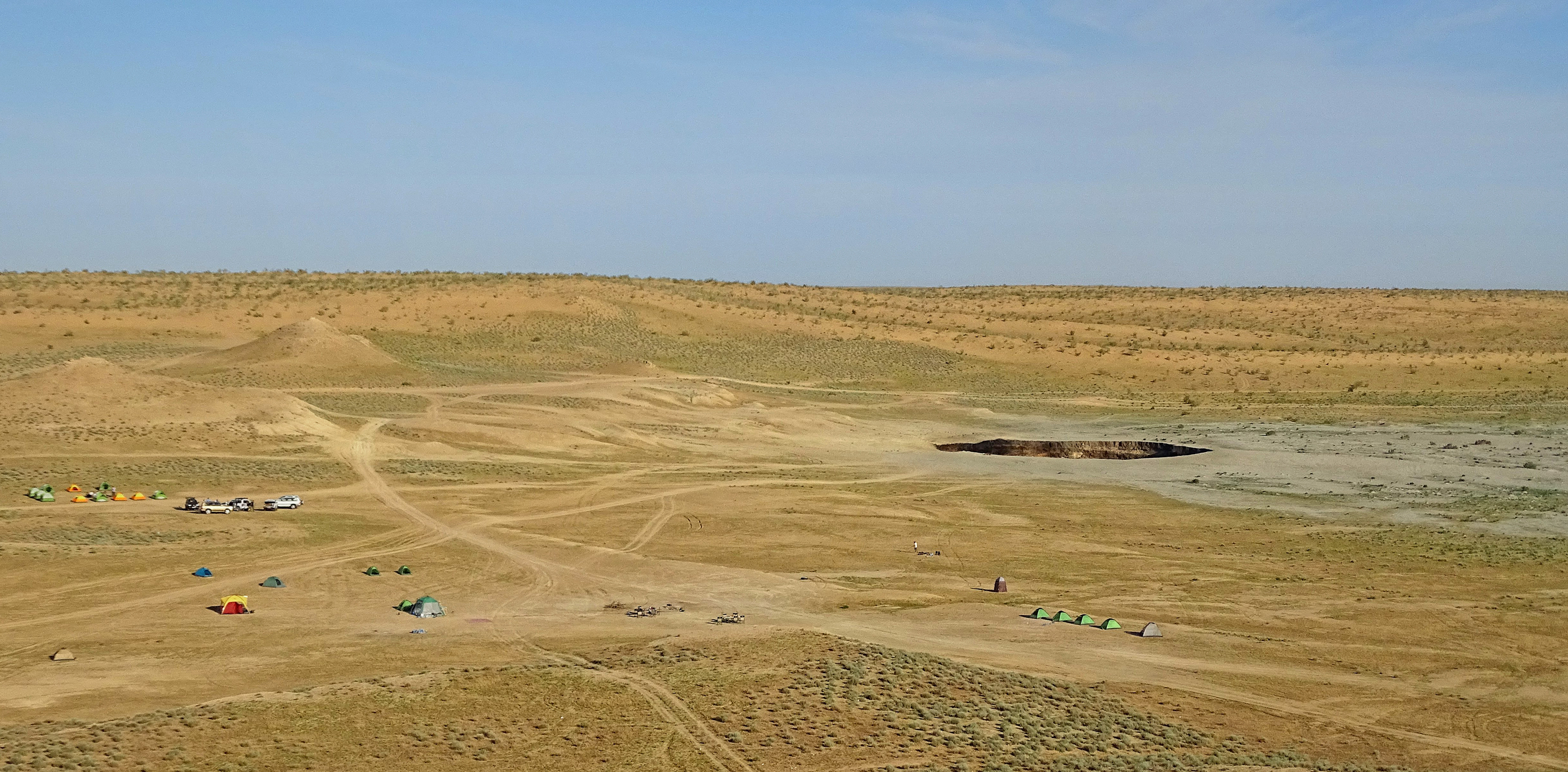
Derweze surroundings 2015.

Derweze, also known as Darvaza (in Russian: Дарваза), is a village in Gökdepe District, Ahal Province, Turkmenistan. It is located in the middle of the Karakum Desert, about 260 km north of Ashgabat. Derweze's inhabitants are mostly Turkmen of the Teke tribe, preserving a semi-nomadic lifestyle. In 2022, it had a population of 2,166 people.

== Etymology ==
Derweze is derivated from Persian "Darvazeh" ("دروازه") which means "Gateway".

== History ==
Derweze was initially a town located 8 km further north than the current settlement.

In 2004, the town was disbanded following the order of the President of Turkmenistan, Saparmurat Niyazov, because "it was an unpleasant sight for tourists." The town has been completely destroyed since then.

On 28 April 2016, Derweze Rural Council was established, and the village of Aeroport was designated as its seat. Derweze was re-established as a village by renaming the village of "Aeroport" to "Derweze."

== Transportation ==
The Darvaza area is served by the Ashgabat-Dashoguz Automobile Highway and the Içoguz station on the Trans-Karakum Railway. A landing strip for small cargo aircraft is located at the village of Derweze.

== Darvaza gas crater ==
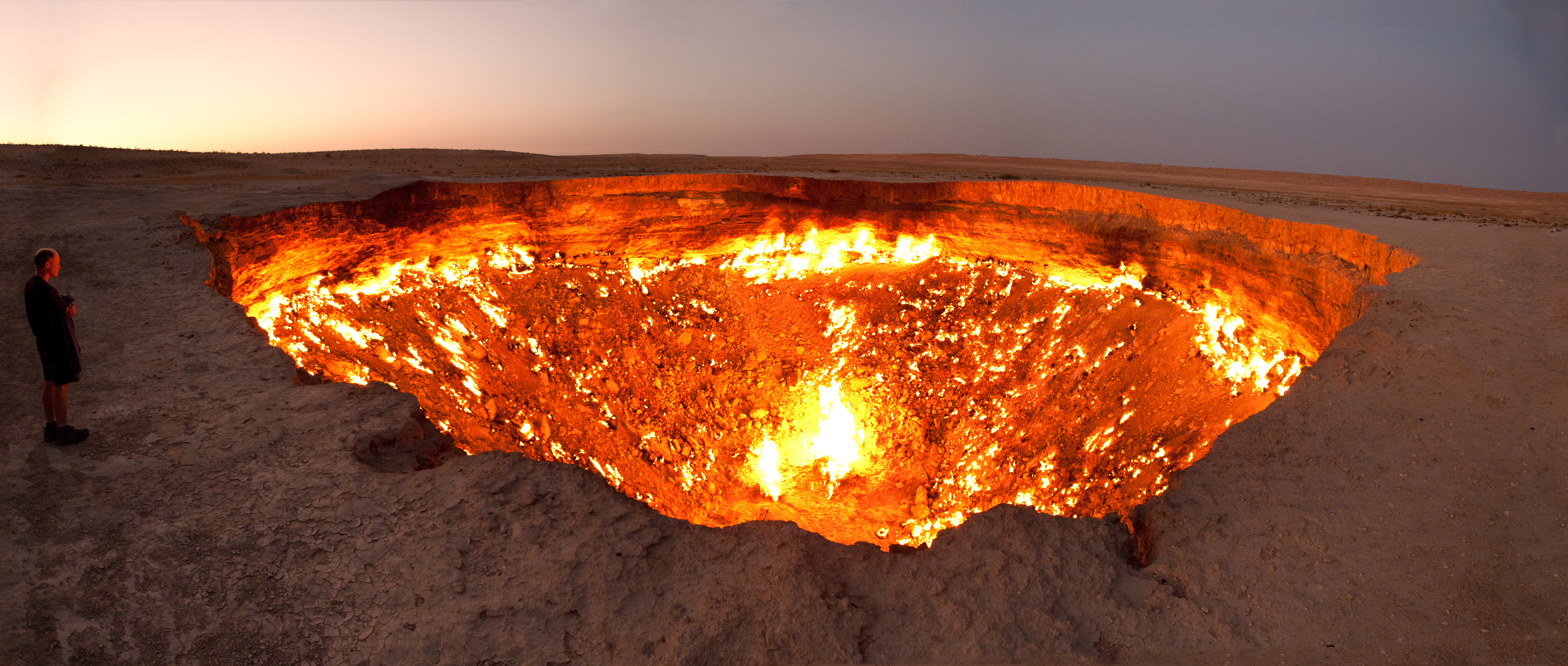
Panorama of the crater site, 2011

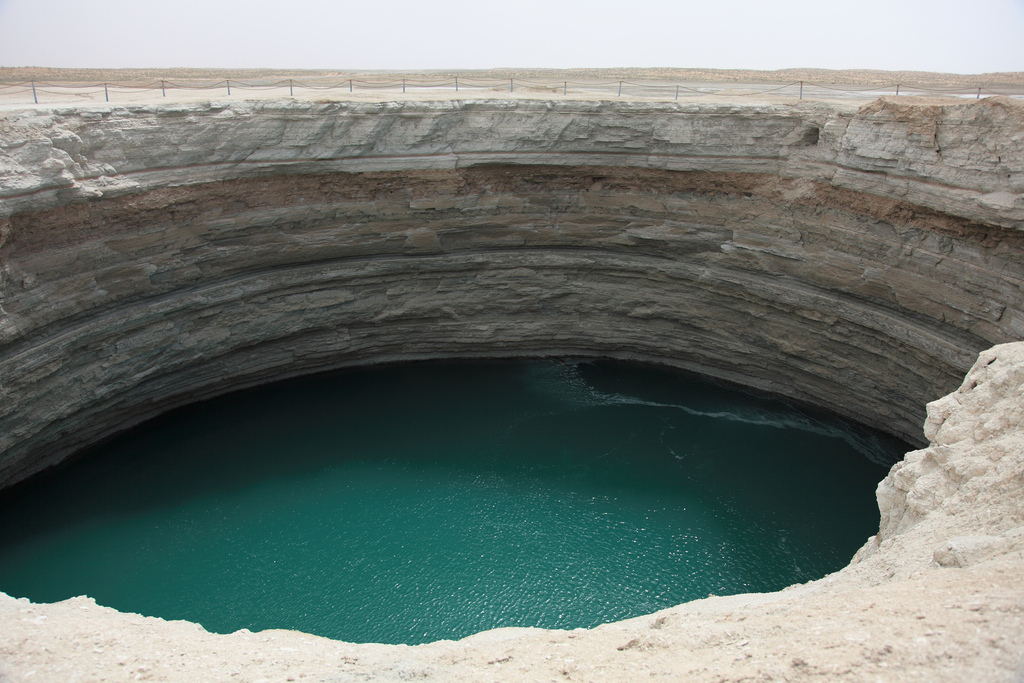
Turquoise Lake Crater, 2010

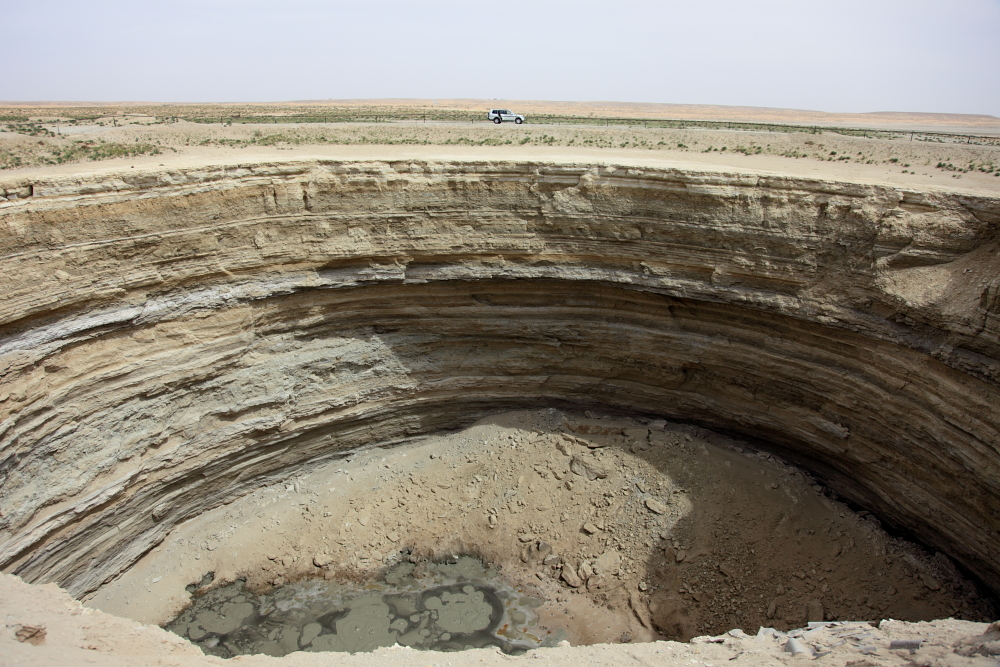
Mud Crater, 2010

The Darvaza area is rich in natural gas. While drilling in 1971, Soviet geologists tapped into a cavern filled with natural gas. The ground beneath the drilling rig collapsed, leaving a large hole with a diameter of 70 metres (230 ft) at 40°15′10″N 58°26′22″E. The fire may have originated from a local Soviet decision to avoid poisonous gas discharge, by burning off the gas, and while geologists had hoped the fire would consume the fuel in a few days, the gas is still burning fifty-five years later.

Locals have named the crater the "Door to Hell".

== Rural Council ==
The village is the seat of a rural council (geňeşlik) including three villages:

- Derweze, village
- Ataguýy, village
- Böri, village

== See also ==
- Darvaza gas crater, the main tourist attraction in the area.
- Energy policy of the Soviet Union
- Eternal Flame Falls
- List of cities, towns and villages in Turkmenistan
- List of municipalities in Ahal Province
- Mine fire
- Sidoarjo mud flow
- Ýerbent, a nearby town that is also in the Karakum Desert.
