= Hanhowuz Reservoir =

Reservoir in Ahal Province, Turkmenistan

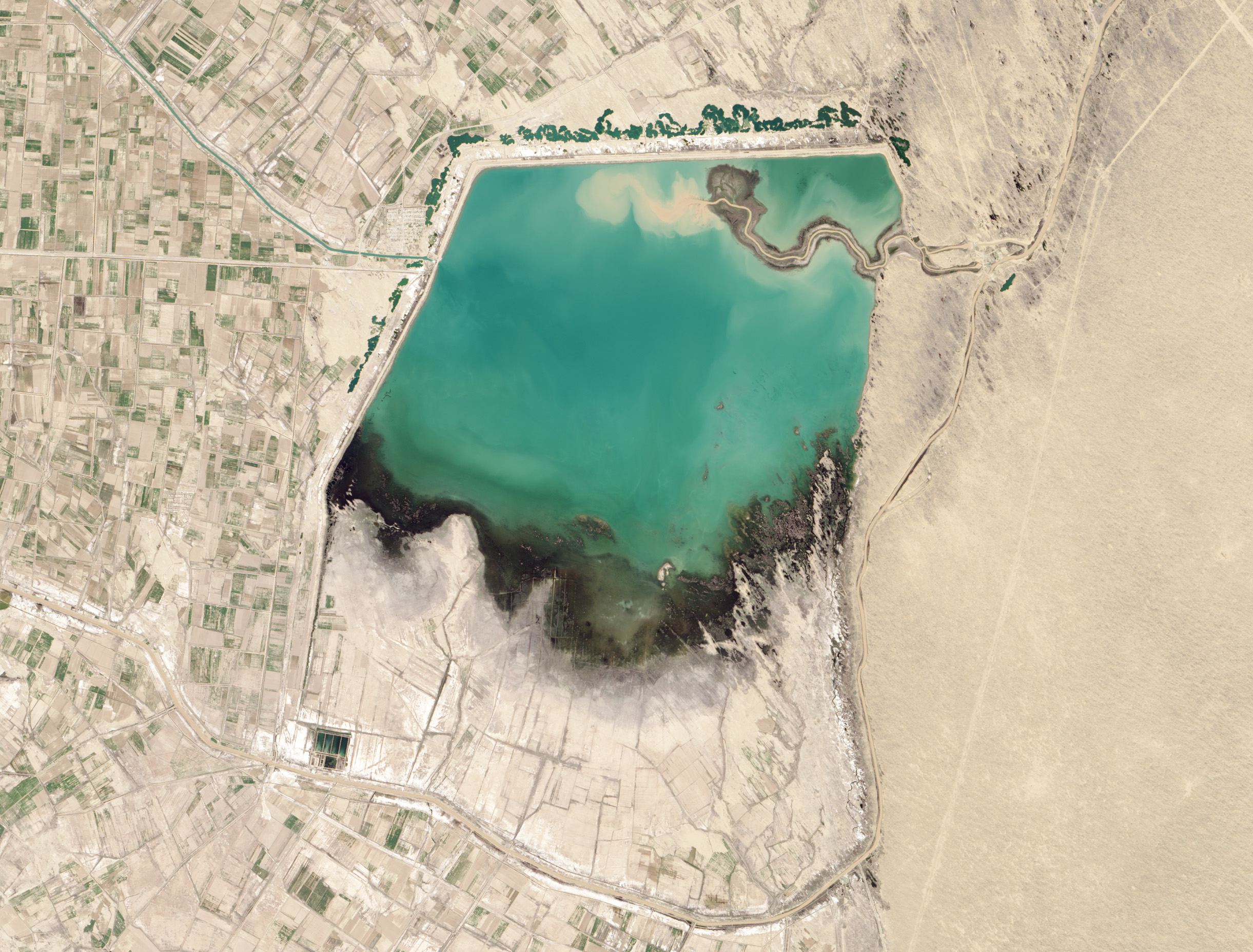
- Hanhowuz reservoir, 2014 Landsat 8

- Location within Turkmenistan
- Interactive map of Hanhowuz Reservoir
- Location: Ahal Province
- Coordinates: 37°13′56″N 61°14′37″E
- Type: Reservoir
- Basin countries: Turkmenistan

Hanhowuz, also known as Khauz-Khan, is a reservoir in Ahal Province of southeastern Turkmenistan. The M37 highway passes nearby and the town of Deňizhan (formerly called Hanhowuz) stands on the northwestern shore, with the city of Tejen not too far away in that direction.

Hanhowuz Reservoir is a component of the Karakum Canal system and was created to attempt to control the erratic Tejen River. It plays an important role in agriculture in the region. The reservoir is named after the legendary khan Oguz Han.

Hanhowuz (Khauzkhan) Reservoir was constructed in a natural depression to capture winter runoff and overflow from the canal for use later during the driest periods of summer. Phytoplankton thrive in the warm waters, as do many commercial fish—including Aral barbel, asp and catfish.

In the satellite image, the Karakum Canal is the brown ribbon dropping down from the upper right corner and heading south and east from the reservoir. A portion of the canal is diverted, and can be seen the brown sediment-laden water entering the reservoir from the east and dropping its load of suspended sediments. The water that leaves is turquoise and travels west to irrigate the Tejen Oasis. Roughly rectilinear farm fields appear on each side of that section of the canal.
