= Berkarar, Ak bugdaý =

Berkarar Berkarar şäherçesi
- Town
- Location in Turkmenistan
- Coordinates: 37°38′53″N 59°09′05″E
- Country: Turkmenistan
- Province: Ahal Province
- District: Ak bugdaý District

Population (2022 official census)
  - Total: 2,747
- Time zone: UTC+5

Berkarar, previously known as Babadurmaz, is a town located in Ak bugdaý District, Ahal Province, Turkmenistan. In 2022, it had a population of 2,747 people.

== Etymology ==
In Turkmen, the word "Berkarar" is an adjective translating as "Stable."

== History ==
On 20 October 2012, the village of Babadurmaz was granted the status of a town and then renamed Berkarar. According to the official decree, the name change was suggested by the locals following developments in the infrastructure.

== See also ==
- Towns of Turkmenistan
- List of municipalities in Ahal Province
