= Bokurdak =

Bokurdak Bokurdak şäherçesi
- Town
- Location in Turkmenistan
- Coordinates: 38.7592°N 58.4968°E
- Country: Turkmenistan
- Province: Ahal Province
- District: Ak bugdaý

Population (2022 official census)
  - Town: 16,110
  - Urban: 7,726
  - Rural: 8,384
- Time zone: UTC+5

Bokurdak is a town in Ak bugdaý District, Ahal Province, Turkmenistan. It is often described as an "urban-type" village. In 2022 it had a population of 7,726 people.

== History ==
The year of establishment of Bokurdak is not known, but it sure is an old settlement.

The village was an important center of the Basmachi movement, a Muslim uprising in Central Asia against Soviet rule.

== Terrain ==
Bokurdak lies in Karakum Desert. The sand dunes here can be up to 50 meters high. It is located about 100 kms north of Ashgabat, the capital of Turkmenistan.

== Demographics ==
The semi-nomadic locals here live in yurts and unfired brick houses with their livestock including camels. Derweze is about 50 kms from here, and group tours often stop in the village on the way.

Opium-poppy fields have reportedly been found here and subsequently destroyed by authorities.

== Dependencies ==
Bokurdak as a town has twenty-four dependent rural villages:

Bokurdak, town:

- Bussy, village
- Çalyş, village
- Çürçüri, village
- Dawaly, village
- Düýeli, village
- Garaberdi, village
- Gargalaňdiňlisi, village
- Garryçyrla, village
- Garryja, village
- Gazykly, village
- Goşalar, village
- Gowşakgyzyltakyr, village
- Göbekli, village
- Gujurly, village
- Güneşli, village
- Gyzylsakal, village
- Hajyguly, village
- Kelleli, village
- Kerpiçli, village
- Mollagurban, village
- Oraz, village
- Oýukly, village
- Töwekgel, village
- Ýerbent, village
