= Tejen District =

Tejen District Tejen etraby
- District
- Etymology: Vambery derived it from the words tei-e hend (tei-e kent, tei— “down”, kent - “village”, “city”) and derived from that “downstream of the city,” “downstream of the city,” or “downstream of the river".
- Location within Turkmenistan
- Coordinates: 37°22′N 60°30′E
- Country: Turkmenistan
- Province: Ahal Province
- Capital: Tejen

Government
  - häkim: Guwançmyrat Orazmyradowiç Ýazmyradow

Area
  - Total: 12,000 km^{2} (4,600 sq mi)

Population (2022 census)
  - Total: 181,961
  - Density: 15/km^{2} (39/sq mi)
- Time zone: UTC+5

Tejen District is a district of Ahal Province in Turkmenistan. It covers an area of 12,000 km^{2} with an estimated 180,000 people in 2022. The main city is Tejen, located near the Hanhowuz Reservoir. The main highway is the M37 highway. Berdi Kerbabayev was born in this district.

== History ==
Tejen District was established in January 1925. On January 5, 2018, a part of Altyn Asyr Etrap was annexed to this region.

== Administrative Subdivisions ==
- Cities (şäherler)
  - Tejen
  - Altyn Asyr
- Towns (şäherçeler)
  - Bagtyýarlyk (Formerly Berkarar)
- Village councils (geňeşlikler)
  - Täzeoba (Türkmenistan)
  - Adalat (Adalat, Akmolla, Ajyköl, Böwrideşik, Mürzeçyrla)
  - Agalaň (Ezizhan)
  - Birleşik (Birleşik)
  - Bitaraplyk (Bitaraplyk, Gowkyzereň pagta bazasy)
  - B. Kerbabaýew adyndaky (B. Kerbabaýew adyndaky)
  - Döwletli (Döwletli)
  - Garaşsyzlyk (Garaşsyzlyk, Takyr, 74-nji duralga)
  - Garryçyrla (Garryçyrla)
  - Göniamaşa (Göniamaşa)
  - Gurban Durdy (Gurban Durdy adyndaky)
  - Zaman (Zaman, Seleňli, Serdar)
  - Waharman (Waharman, Lukman, Ak altyn, Bugdaýly, Maldarçylyk)
