= Bäherden District =

Bäherden District Baharly District 2003-2018
- District
- Bäherden etraby
- Location within Turkmenistan
- Coordinates: 38°25′49″N 57°26′13″E
- Country: Turkmenistan
- Province: Ahal Province
- Capital: Baherden

Government
  - häkim: Şamuhammet Begenjowiç Orazmuhammedow

Area
  - Total: 16,690 km^{2} (6,440 sq mi)

Population (2022 census)
  - Total: 126,409
  - Density: 7.574/km^{2} (19.62/sq mi)
- Time zone: UTC+5 (+5)

Bäherden District is a district of Ahal Province, Turkmenistan. From 2003 to 2018 it was named Baharly ("spring-like") District.

== History ==
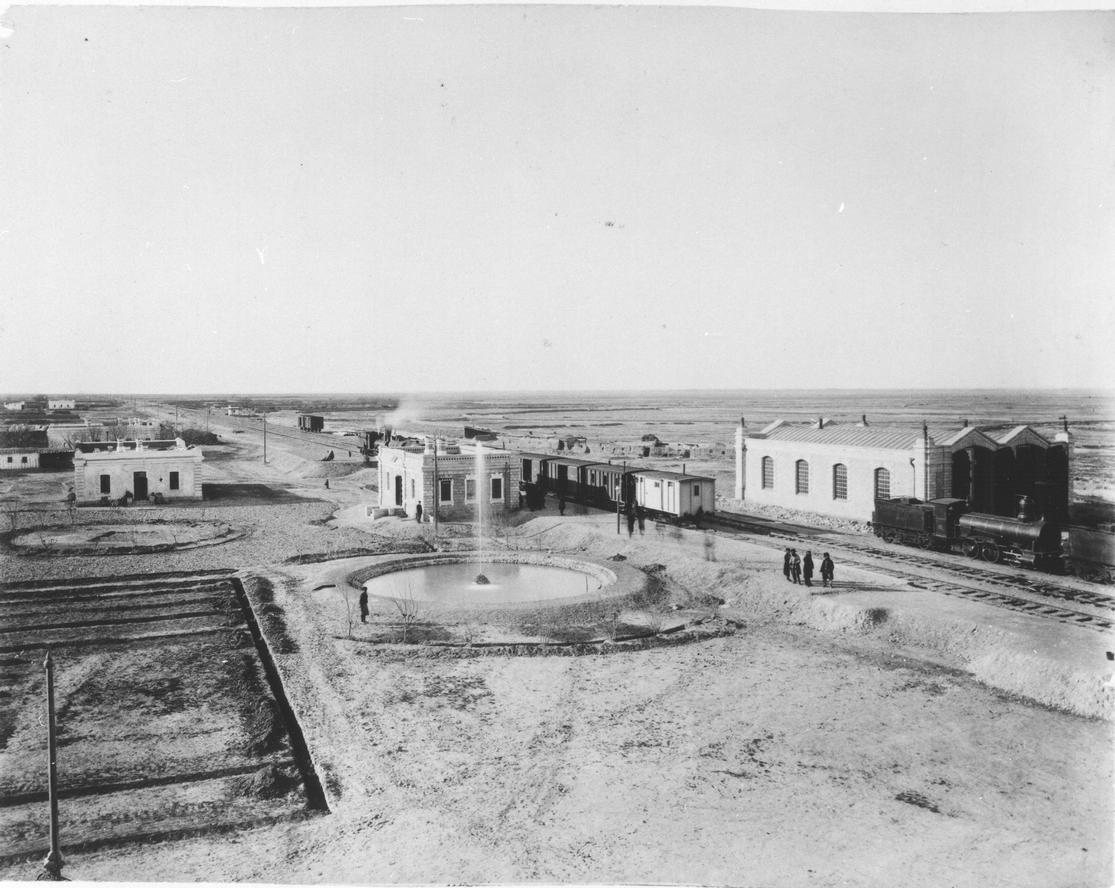
The station of Baharly on the Trans-Caspian Railway, c. 1890

It was formed in January 1926 as the Bakharden District of the Poltoratsk District of the Turkmen SSR. Its administrative center was Bakharden Station. In August 1926 the Poltoratsk District was abolished, and the Bakharden District was directly subordinated to the Turkmen SSR.

In November 1939, the region was assigned to the newly formed Ashkhabad oblast. In May 1959, Ashgabat oblast was abolished and the district again became a direct subordination of the Turkmen SSR. In 1963, the Bakharden District was abolished, but in 1965 it was reёstablished. In December 1973, Ashgabat oblast was recreated, which included the Bakharden district. In 1988, Ashgabat oblast was again abolished and the district was directly subordinated to the Turkmen SSR.

On 23 October 2003, by Presidential Decree 6435 the city and district (etrap) of Bäherden were renamed Baharly (“spring-like”). On 5 January 2018, by Parliamentary Resolution No. 686-V, Baharly city and district (etrap) had their old name of Bäherden restored.

== Administrative Subdivisions ==
- Cities (şäherler)
  - Bäherden
- Towns (şäherçeler)
  - Arçman (inc. Arçman bekedi, Arçman şypahanasy, Keletdag, Täzeoba)
- Village councils (geňeşlikler)
  - Akdepe (Akdepe, 97-nji duralga)
  - Bamy (Bamy, Ymarat)
  - Börme (Börme, 103-nji duralga)
  - Döwgala (Döwgala)
  - Durun (Durun)
  - Garagan (Garagan)
  - Garawul (Garawul, Könegümmez)
  - Kirpili (Kirpili, Atabeg, Hajyölen, Sözenlioýy)
  - Mürçe (Mürçe, Etegoýy, Tagyoýy)
  - Nohur (Nohur)
  - Saýwan (Saýwan, Deşt)
  - Sünçe (Sünçe, 100-nji duralga)
  - Ýarajy (Ýarajy, Kelete)
