= Arçman =

Arçman Arçman şäherçesi
- Town
- Location in Turkmenistan
- Coordinates: 38°32′36″N 57°09′26″E
- Country: Turkmenistan
- Province: Ahal Province
- District: Bäherden District
- Elevation: 157 m (515 ft)

Population (2022 official census)
  - Town: 8,247
  - Urban: 6,014
  - Rural: 2,233
- Time zone: UTC+5

Arçman is a town in Bäherden District, Ahal Province, Turkmenistan. The place is renowned for the hot springs located about 11 km away. In 2022, it had an urban population of 6,014 people.

== Etymology ==
Legend has it that the hot springs (and the village) were named after a shepherd who had discovered its healing properties, after getting cured of a skin rash. (Note: Arçman's (alleged) mausoleum lies near the village.)

== Medical Tourism ==
The spa, Arçman Sanitorium (Turkmen: Arçman şypahanasy), was opened in 1915. Reputed for the healing properties of its water, different alternative treatment regimens—mineral spa, gastric lavage, balneotherapy, drinking therapy, and others—are available, in combination with medical imaging services and physiotherapy.

In 2001, President Nyýazow opened a marble resort, replacing previous Soviet facilities; this was further expanded in 2009 into a 920-bed center. (Note: Abu Dhabi Fund for Development had funded a part of these expenses.) Primarily aimed at those patients who had to visit the sanatorium for about a week, the project has been fairly successful. There is one small mausoleum, devoted to Gochgar Ata, near the resort.

In 2009 major expansion was completed, including the construction of a new residential building designed for 400 beds. Infrastructure upgrades involved bringing drinking water from a source located 7 kilometers away, extensive landscaping of the grounds, and the construction of a dedicated health trail allowing patients to combine mineral water treatments with physical activities.

On October 9, 2026, an official opening ceremony was held for a new complex of buildings at the Archman Sanatorium. The expansion aims to increase accommodation capacity and advance the national strategy for public health and sanatorium-recreation infrastructure.

The new four-story medical and residential complex at the Archman Sanatorium, designed for 400 guests, features specialized balneotherapy facilities for mineral and hydrogen sulfide baths, a modernized mineral water pump room, multi-profile departments, comfortable rooms, a 400-seat restaurant with custom dietary menus, a herbal tea bar, children's play areas, and a gym. The building is equipped with advanced medical technology, including a Russian-made cardiovisor for 3D heart diagnostics, a Fujifilm endoscopic system for gastroenterology, an American Diversatek Healthcare pH-monitoring system, BTL physiotherapy equipment, and specialized units for ozone therapy, halotherapy, spa capsules, and pressotherapy.

=== Limnology ===
The water is slightly alkaline with low sulfide levels; it is classified as potable water. It is rich in minerals like chlorine, sodium, calcium, and magnesium. (Note: One government publication (2019) notes temperature to hover between 28 °C (82 °F) to 50 °C (122 °F). Another (2016) notes the range to be 28.2 °C (82.8 °F) to 28.5 °C (83.3 °F).)

== Transportation ==
In 2003, an Iranian company was contracted to connect the M37 highway with the sanitorium. It is also served by an eponymous station on the Trans-Caspian Railway, about 9 km away.

== Dependencies ==
Arçman as a town has two subordinate villages:

Arçman, town:

- Arçman bekedi, village
- Keletdag, village

== See also ==
- Towns of Turkmenistan
- List of municipalities in Ahal Province
