= Darvaza gas crater =

Burning natural gas field in Turkmenistan

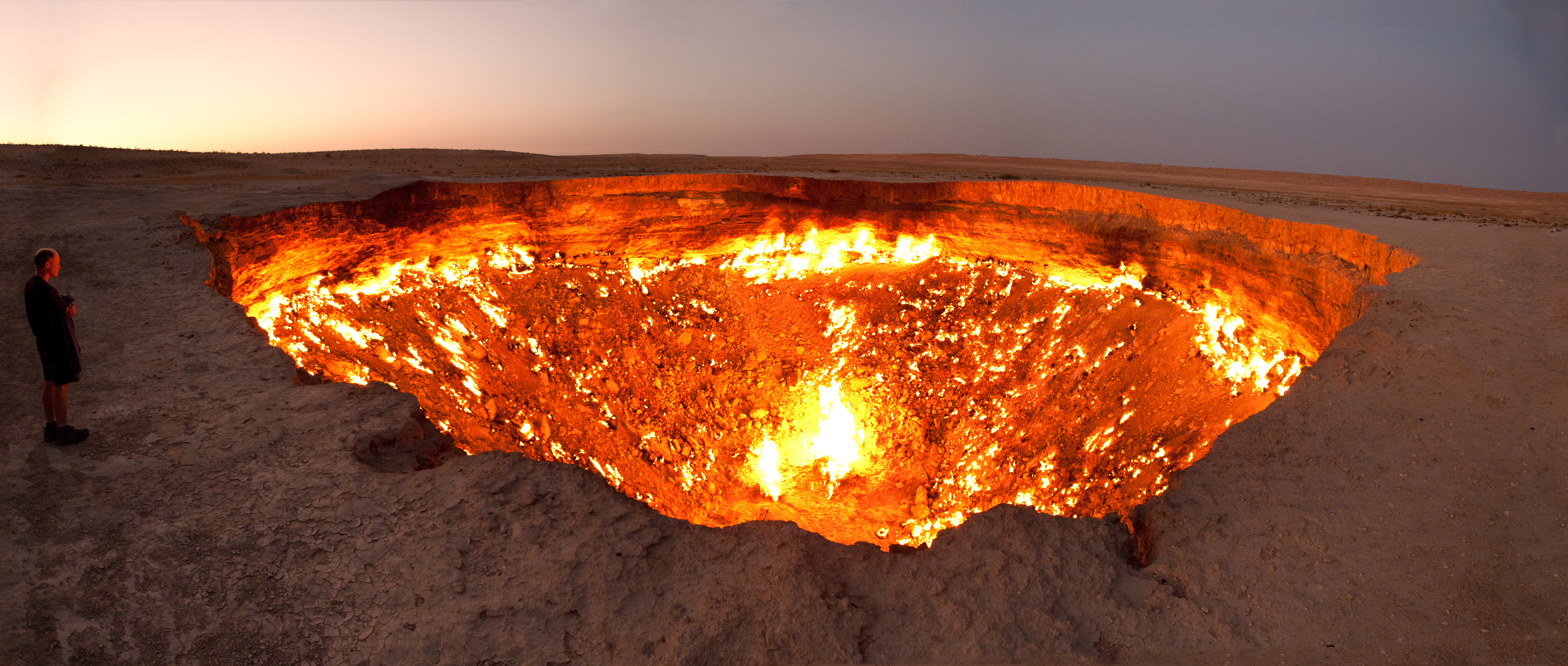
- Darvaza gas crater, 2011

- Location within Turkmenistan
- Country: Turkmenistan
- Region: Ahal Province
- Coordinates: 40°15′09″N 58°26′23″E

The Darvaza gas crater (Turkmen: Garagum ýalkymy), also known as the Door to Hell or Gates of Hell, and known officially as the Shining of Karakum, is a burning natural gas field collapsed into a cavern near Darvaza, Turkmenistan. Hundreds of natural gas fires illuminate the floor and rim of the crater. The gas crater has been burning since 1971. The most common theory for the forming of the crater is that drilling punctured a natural-gas cavern, the cavern's roof collapsed, and (some sources say) engineers ignited the crater to prevent poisonous gases from spreading.

The crater is near the village of Darvaza in the middle of the Karakum Desert. Located about 260 kilometres (160 mi) north of Ashgabat (the capital of Turkmenistan), it has a diameter of 60–70 metres (200–230 ft) and a depth of about 30 metres (98 ft). Another nearby gas crater is fenced off and has a distinct odor.

== History ==
The early years of the crater's history are still being determined. Relevant records are either absent from the archives, classified, or inaccessible. Some local geologists have claimed that the collapse of a crater happened in the 1960s; it was set on fire only in the 1980s to prevent the emission of poisonous gases. Others assert that the site was drilled by Soviet engineers in 1971 as an oil field but collapsed within days, forming the crater, with the engineers choosing to flare the crater to prevent the emission of poisonous gases but underestimating the volume of the gas.

=== Controlling the burn ===
In April 2010, President Gurbanguly Berdimuhamedow recommended that measures be taken to limit the crater's influence on the development of other natural gas fields in the area. In January 2022, Berdimuhamedow announced plans to extinguish the crater, citing deleterious effects on local health, the environment, and the natural gas industry. A commission was established to find the optimal technique. Despite Berdimuhamedow's intentions, the crater remains open and burning.

In 2025, authorities declared that the size of the fire had been reduced three-fold over an unspecified timeframe, while several wells were drilled around the crater to capture methane. By August, the crater, which was said to have been the country's top tourist attraction, had only a few pockets of small fires. Infrared images taken in 2026 show the fires are on the decline. The intensity of heat from the flames has diminished by more than 75 percent over the last three years, according to an analysis by Capterio, a company that monitors natural gas flares.

== Tourism and culture ==
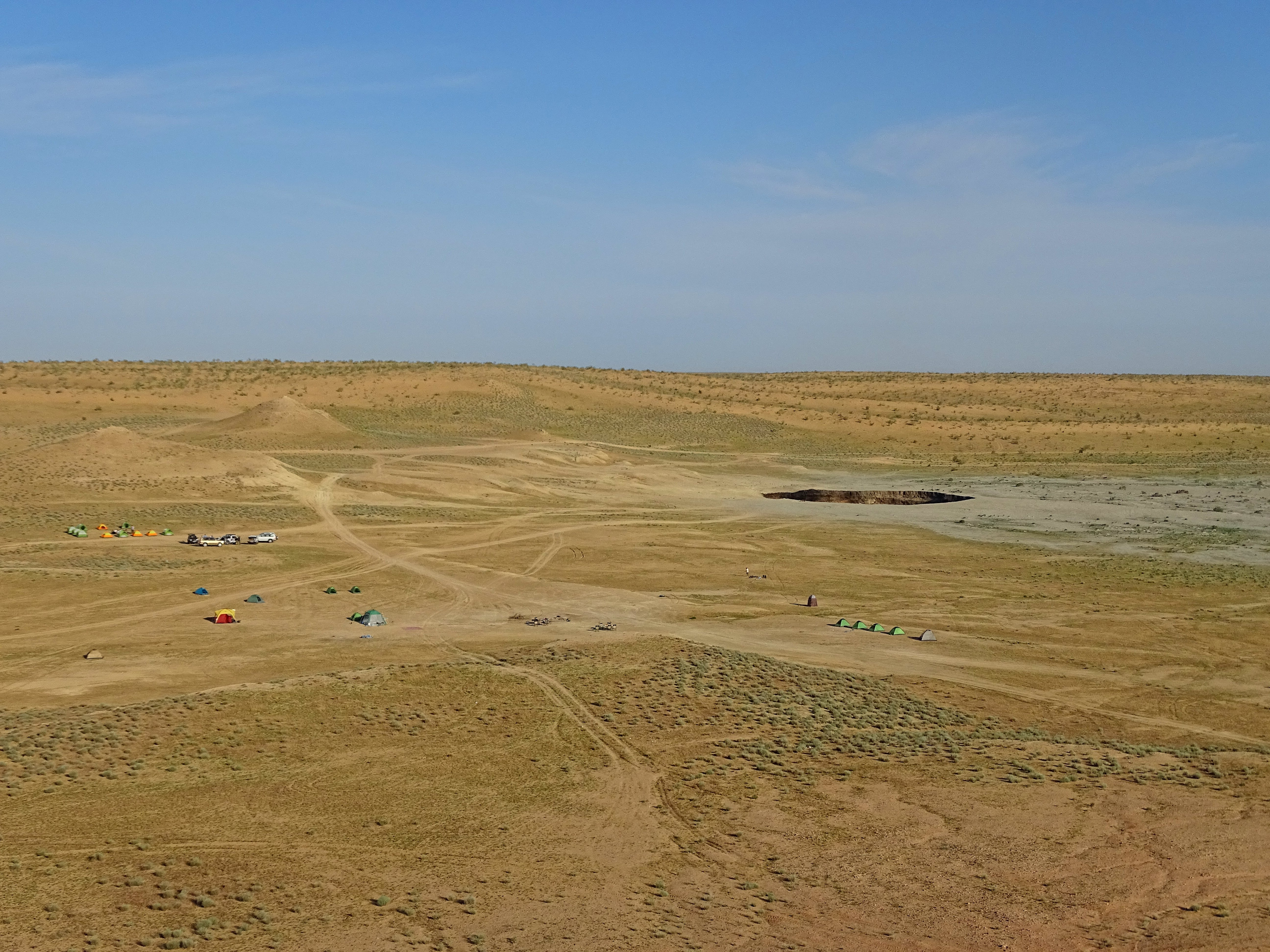
The Darvaza gas crater and the surroundings. Tents are visible, which facilitate nocturnal trips to the site.

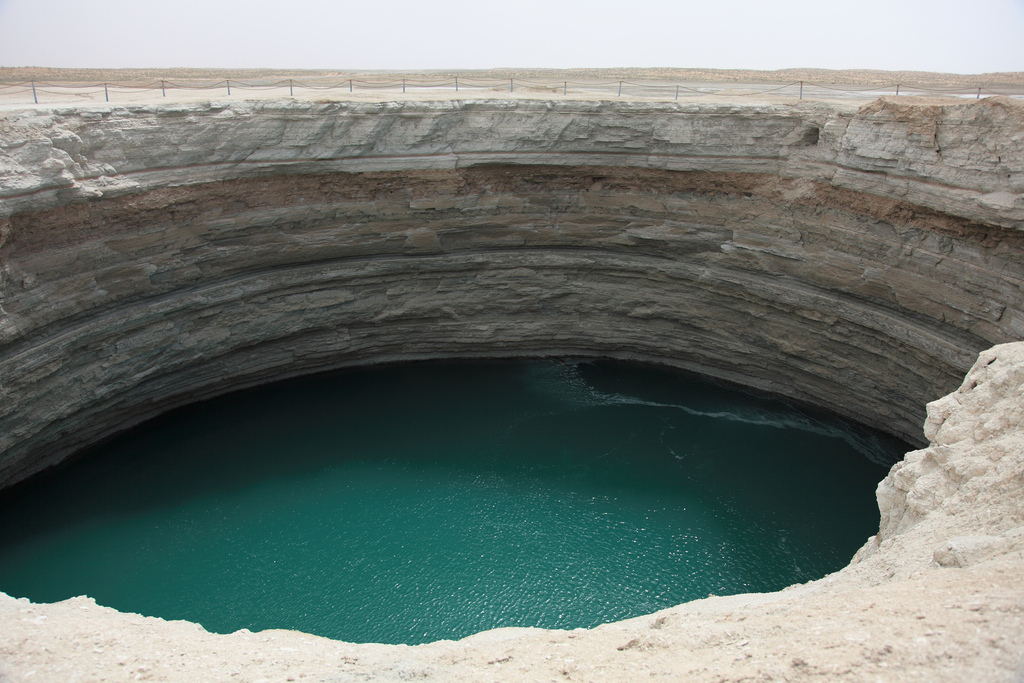
A crater filled with water; gas bubbles are visible. About 23 km from the Darvaza gas crater.

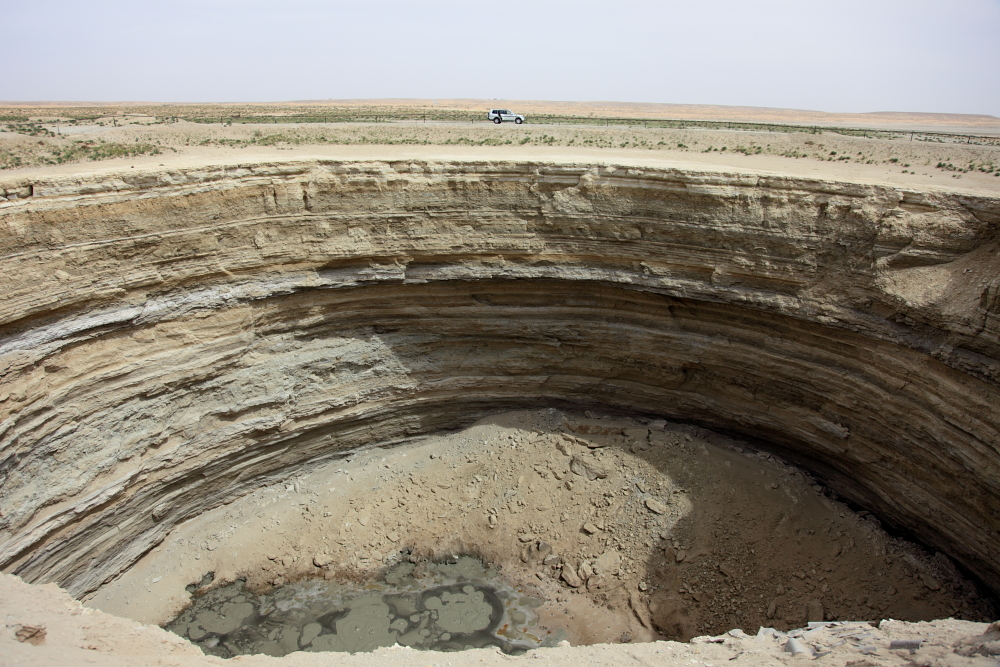
The mud crater. About 10 km from the Darvaza Gas Crater.

The crater is difficult to visit. All foreigners need a visa to enter Turkmenistan, and the crater is approximately a four-hour drive from the capital Ashgabat. Nevertheless, in post-Soviet Turkmenistan, the crater has become a major tourist attraction, perhaps aided by the declaration of the region as a natural reserve in 2013. A crude road without signage runs out to the crater, and yurts have been set up nearby.

In 2018, the gas crater was used as an overnight stop in the Amul-Hazar automobile rally. In 2019, President Gurbanguly Berdymukhamedov appeared on state television apparently driving around the crater in a truck doing doughnut stunts to disprove rumors of his death, but the footage was cut in such a way that he was never actually seen driving near the crater itself.

=== Exploration ===
In 2013, George Kourounis became the first person to set foot at the bottom of the crater; he was gathering soil samples for the Extreme Microbiome Project. The descent was sponsored by National Geographic and featured in an episode of the National Geographic Channel series Die Trying.

I describe it as a coliseum of fire—just everywhere you look it's thousands of these small fires. The sound was like that of a jet engine, this roaring, high-pressure, gas-burning sound. And there was no smoke. It burns very cleanly, so there's nothing to obscure your view. You can just see every little lick of flame.

— George Kourounis, Interview with National Geographic

Kourounis used a custom-made Kevlar harness and multiple Technora ropes attached to a full-body aluminized suit with a self-contained breathing apparatus. He has since wished to descend into the crater again, carrying more equipment for better profiling of the local biome.

Data from Carbon Mapper, a nonprofit organization based in Pasadena, California, shows that the crater emitted an average of about 1,300 kilograms of methane per hour from 2022 to 2025. Data collected in October 2025 shows methane emission of 1,960 kilograms per hour. Turkmenistan has one of the highest levels of global methane emissions according to International Energy Agency.

== See also ==
- Eternal fire at Baba Gurgur in Iraq
- Batagaika crater – expanding permafrost crater in Siberia
- Burning Mountain
- Centralia mine fire
- Disaster tourism
- New Straitsville mine fire
- Well to Hell hoax
- Yanar Dag
