= M37 highway (Turkmenistan) =

Highway in Turkmenistan

M37
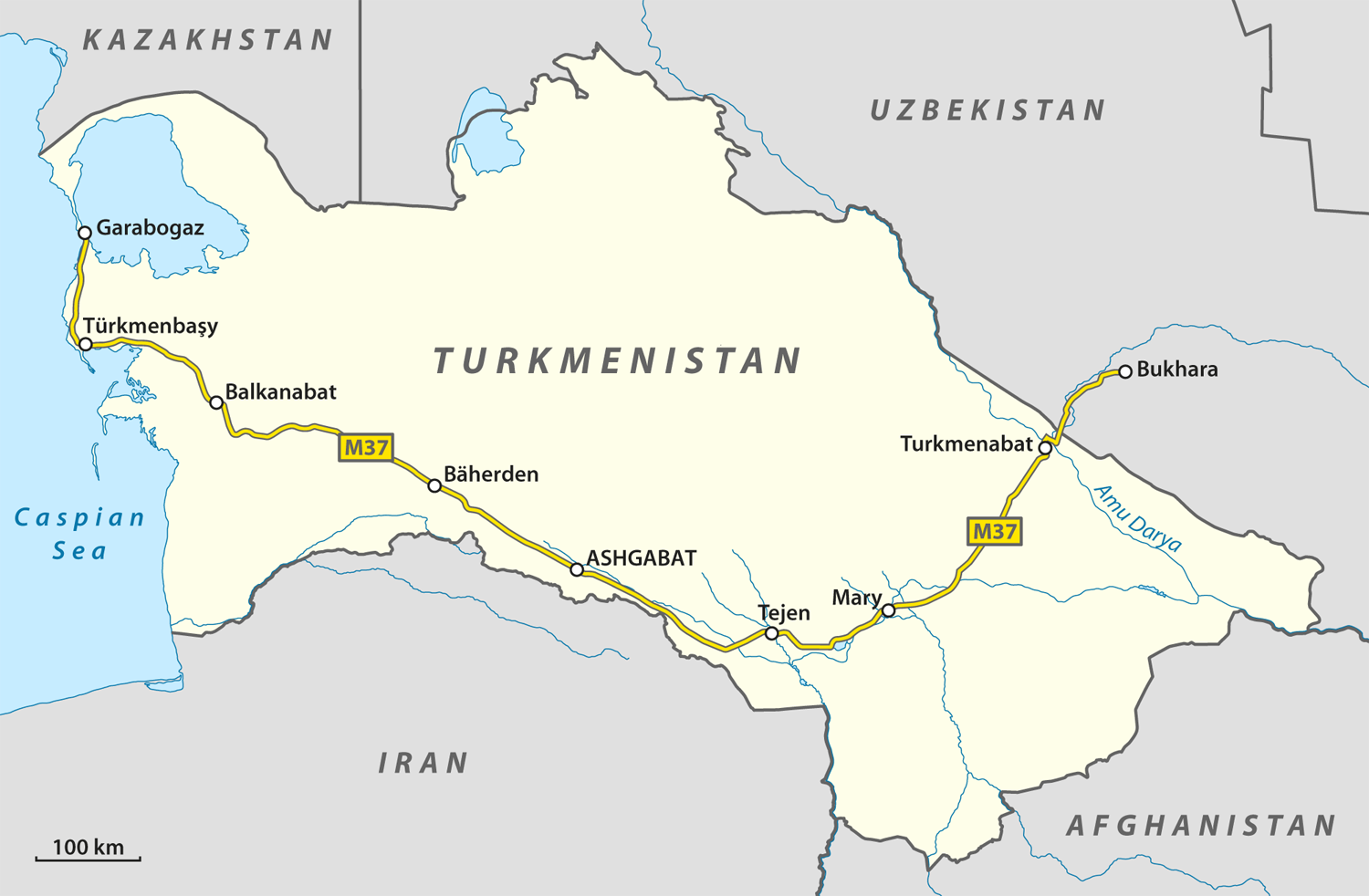
- The M37 highway

Route information
- Part of E60
- Part of AH5

Location
- Country: Turkmenistan

Highway system
- Transport in Turkmenistan

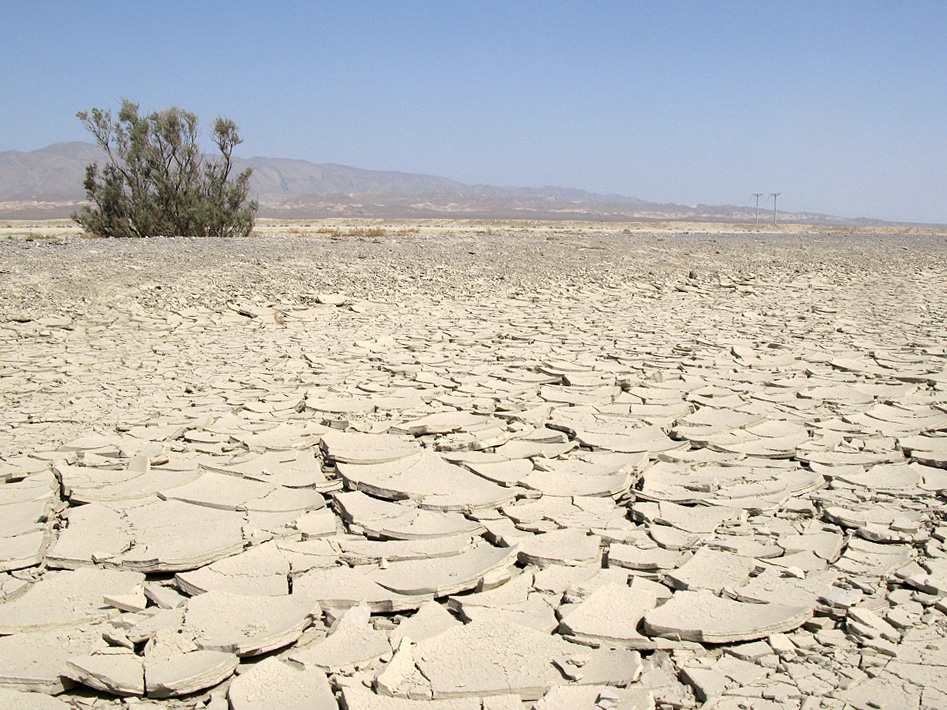
The highway passes north through the Karakum Desert

The M37 highway is a highway in Turkmenistan. It is the Turkmenistan section of the European route E60 and Asian Highway AH5, which connects Brest, France to Irkeshtam, Kyrgyzstan on the border with the People's Republic of China. It connects most of the major cities in the country from Türkmenbaşy on the Caspian Sea on the west coast to Bukhara, Uzbekistan.

From Türkmenbaşy the highway proceeds east, passing through Jebel, Balkanabat, Gumdag, Bereket, Gyzylarbat, Bäherden, Gokdepe, Ashgabat, Gämi, Anew, Artyk, Kaka, Dushak, Tejen, Hanhowuz Reservoir, Mary, Bayramaly, crosses the Karakum Canal, proceeding north into the Repetek Nature Reserve within the Karakum Desert, passing Bagtyýarlyk, Turkmenabat, and Farap, before crossing the Amu Darya and into Uzbekistan.

The first phase of the Ashgabat–Turkmenabat Motorway was completed in 2021. It is not clear whether this motorway will be designated M37, replacing the original M37.
