= Sanganeh =

Sanganeh سنگانه
- Village
- Location within Iran
- Coordinates: 36°41′18″N 60°14′06″E
- Country: Iran
- Province: Razavi Khorasan
- County: Kalat
- Bakhsh: Zavin
- Rural District: Pasakuh

Population (2006)
  - Total: 63
- Time zone: UTC+3:30 (IRST)
  - Summer (DST): UTC+4:30 (IRDT)

Sanganeh (Persian: سنگانه, also Romanized as Sangāneh; also known as Sangāneh-ye Pā’īn and Sangunak ) is a village in Pasakuh Rural District, Zavin District, Kalat County, Razavi Khorasan Province, Iran. At the 2006 census, its population was 63, in 17 families.
