= Ak bugdaý District =

Coordinates: 38°30′N 59°0′E

Ak bugdaý District Ak bugdaý etraby
- District
- Interactive map of Ak bugdaý District
- Country: Turkmenistan
- Province: Ahal Province
- administrative center: Anau, Turkmenistan

Government
  - häkim: Rowşen Welmyradowyç Jumaýew

Area
  - Total: 8,640 sq mi (22,370 km^{2})

Population (2022 census)
  - Total: 144,119
  - Density: 16.69/sq mi (6.443/km^{2})
- Time zone: UTC+5

Ak bugdaý District is a district of Ahal Province in Turkmenistan. It was founded in April 1977 as Gäwers District, with its center on the urban-type settlement of Anau. Abolished in August 1988, it was restored in 1992 as part of Ahal, where it was later renamed Ak bugday ("white wheat").

== Etymology ==
Photo of the White Wheat Museum in Änew, Ahal, Turkmenistan, behind a statue of Saparmyrat Nyýazow, first president of Turkmenistan

Ak bugday in Turkic languages means "white wheat". Local lore holds that white wheat was first cultivated in this area, and the capital of this district, Anau, features a museum devoted to white wheat as well as local archeology.

== Industry ==
The Ahal State Power Station (Turkmen: Ahal Döwlet Elektrik Stansiýasy), located about 9 kilometers NE of Anau, with design capacity of 650 megawatts, was constructed to power the city of Ashgabat. It began operating in 2010 with two gas turbines producing 254.2 MW. Three small gas turbines were added in 2013 and two more gas turbines in 2014, bringing capacity to 648.1 MW. The additional capacity was needed in particular to power Ashgabat's Olympic Village.

== Awards ==
In February 2024 Ak bugdaý District was recognized as the best district in Turkmenistan for 2023, winning a cash prize of one million U.S. dollars.

== Administrative Subdivisions ==
=== Cities ===
- Änew

=== Towns ===
- Berkarar
- Bereketli zaman, including two villages
- Bokurdak, including twenty-four villages
- Ýaşlyk, including four villages

=== Rural Councils ===
- Bereket, including one village
- Bereketli, including eight villages
- Bugdaýly, including three villages
- Burunojar, including one village
- Garagum, including one village
- Gämi, including two villages
- Magtymguly, including one village
- Öňaldy, including nine villages
- Parahat, including one village
- Sähra, including three villages
- Täzedurmuş, including seven villages
- Ýaşyldepe, including one village
