= Kaka, Turkmenistan =

Kaka Kaka şäheri
- City
- Location in Turkmenistan
- Coordinates: 37°21′N 59°36′E
- Country: Turkmenistan
- Province: Ahal Province
- District: Kaka District

Population (2022 official census)
  - City: 33,759
  - Urban: 33,315
  - Rural: 444
- Time zone: UTC+5

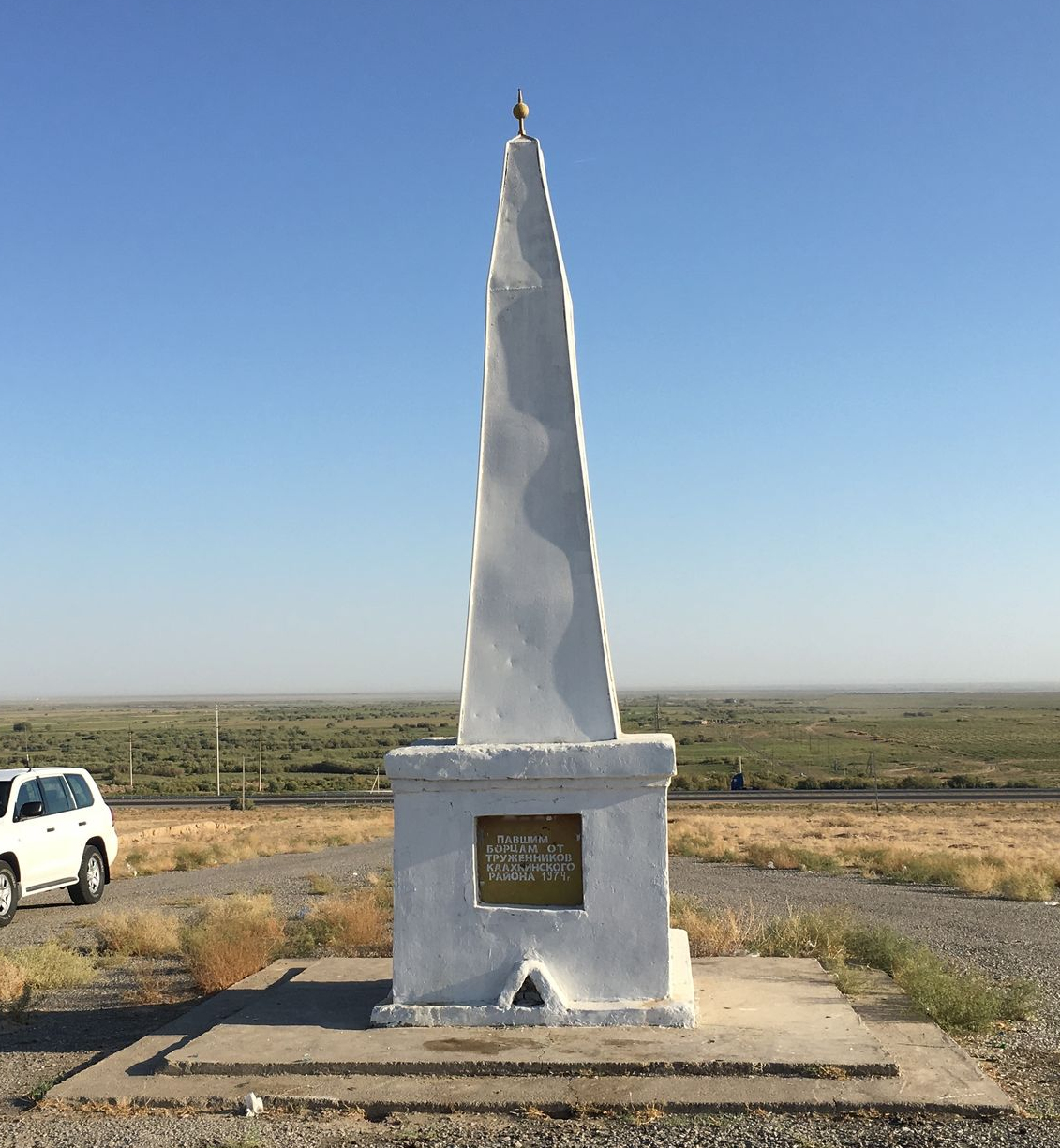
Monument outside Kaka, Turkmenistan, in memory of fallen revolutionaries.

Kaka, also known in Russian as Kaakhka ("Каахка"), is a city in and capital of Kaka District, Ahal Province, Turkmenistan. It lies on the Trans-Caspian railway and the M37 highway. In 2022, it had a population of 33,315 people.

== Etymology ==
The name Kaka is of obscure origin. Some local elders have attributed it to an eponymous "long-forgotten" local king, while others to the Persian onomatopoeic word قهقهه (Qahqahe) "ha-ha", a deep laugh, indicating that the area is a happy land. The current spelling of the name, Kaka, was established by parliamentary decree in April 1992.

== History ==
Timur had a fortress—of unknown antiquity—restored in 1382 during his campaigns in East Caspian lands, and named it "Kahkah". The ruins of the fortress command immense archaeological significance.

The city was initially known as Kaakhka by the Russian, then renamed Ginzberg ("Гинцбeрг") from 1919 until 1927. It was renamed Kaakhka once again in 1927.

Fighting took place in Kaka between the Trans Caspian Mensheviks and the Tashkent Bolsheviks on 28 August and on 11 and 18 September 1918 during the Russian Civil War. Troops of the British India Army were involved.

== Dependencies ==
Kaka as a town has only a single dependent rural village: Hywaabat.

== Transport ==
There is a Tsarist era railway station.
