= Bäherden =

Place in Turkmenistan

Bäherden Bäherden şäheri
- City
- Location in Turkmenistan
- Coordinates: 38°26′07″N 57°25′49″E
- Country: Turkmenistan
- Province: Ahal Province
- District: Bäherden District

Government
  - Häkim: Dörtguly Hojaýew

Population (2022 official census)
  - Total: 37,588
- Time zone: UTC+05:00 (TMT)

Bäherden, formerly Baharly (2003–2018), is a city and the seat of Bäherden District, Ahal Province, Turkmenistan. It lies on the northern rim of the Kopet Dag mountain range, south-east of the resort town of Arçman. In 2022, it had a population of 37,588 people.

== Etymology ==
According to Atanyyazow, some archaeologists have related it to a village called Abhadaran, located 3 to 4 kilometers northeast of Bäherden, but local greybeards interpret it as deriving from Bahrizen ("the lake of your wife") and Maharram (the name of the queen of a one-time chief of Durun).

Baharly means "springlike" in Turkmen. According to former President Niyazov, Turkmens, during the times of Oghuz Khagan, spent springtime in the area.

== History ==
The settlement was conquered and incorporated into Russia in 1881 following the Battle of Gökdepe. At the end of the 19th century, it housed 789 people and was a stop along the Trans-Caspian Railway. Bäherden was administrative center of the Bäherden district of the Turkmen SSR. On February 3, 2008, it received the status of a city.

Climate data for Bäherden (1991–2020)
Month	Jan	Feb	Mar	Apr	May	Jun	Jul	Aug	Sep	Oct	Nov	Dec	Year
Record high °C (°F)	24.7 (76.5)	29.6 (85.3)	36.1 (97.0)	39.4 (102.9)	43.6 (110.5)	45.1 (113.2)	46.8 (116.2)	45.2 (113.4)	43.4 (110.1)	39.8 (103.6)	33.7 (92.7)	27.8 (82.0)	46.8 (116.2)
Mean maximum °C (°F)	19.1 (66.4)	22.9 (73.2)	27.8 (82.0)	33.9 (93.0)	38.0 (100.4)	41.5 (106.7)	42.7 (108.9)	42.0 (107.6)	38.2 (100.8)	33.8 (92.8)	25.2 (77.4)	21.3 (70.3)	32.2 (90.0)
Daily mean °C (°F)	3.7 (38.7)	5.5 (41.9)	11.2 (52.2)	17.7 (63.9)	24.5 (76.1)	30.0 (86.0)	32.3 (90.1)	30.7 (87.3)	24.8 (76.6)	17.3 (63.1)	9.6 (49.3)	4.7 (40.5)	17.7 (63.9)
Mean minimum °C (°F)	−6.4 (20.5)	−5.4 (22.3)	−0.3 (31.5)	5.2 (41.4)	12.4 (54.3)	17.8 (64.0)	21.1 (70.0)	18.6 (65.5)	12.2 (54.0)	4.1 (39.4)	−2.3 (27.9)	−5.2 (22.6)	6.0 (42.8)
Record low °C (°F)	−18.4 (−1.1)	−18.5 (−1.3)	−6.3 (20.7)	−0.5 (31.1)	4.6 (40.3)	11.9 (53.4)	16.7 (62.1)	12.2 (54.0)	7.6 (45.7)	−1.8 (28.8)	−11.3 (11.7)	−12.1 (10.2)	−18.5 (−1.3)
Average precipitation mm (inches)	16.5 (0.65)	24.4 (0.96)	31.1 (1.22)	27.6 (1.09)	19.4 (0.76)	4.9 (0.19)	3.4 (0.13)	2.0 (0.08)	4.4 (0.17)	11.7 (0.46)	17.9 (0.70)	16.2 (0.64)	179.5 (7.07)
Average precipitation days (≥ 1.0 mm)	12.4	16.4	15.9	13.8	9.7	4.0	1.9	1.6	3.2	7.1	11.7	11.4	109.0
Source: NOAA

== Industry ==
The Bäherden Cement Plant, put into operation in 2005, has a design capacity of one million tons of cement per year.

The Bäherden Ceramic Products Plant in Bäherden, opened on March 14, 2025, produces 3.3 million square meters of ceramic tiles and 120,000 sanitary ware units annually using local raw materials. Equipped with advanced technology from SACMI, it meets Industry 4.0 standards, is environmentally friendly, provides 460 jobs.

== Culture ==
=== People born in Bäherdern ===
- Şamuhammet Durdylyýew, former mayor of Aşgabat, Deputy Chairman of the Cabinet of Minister of Turkmenistan and mayor of Arkadag.
- Nury Halmämmedow, composer.
- Ýaýlym Ý. Berdiýew, military, minister for national security of Turkmenistan.
