= Sarahs District =

District in Ahal Province, Turkmenistan

Sarahs District Sarahs etraby
- District
- Interactive map of Sarahs District
- Coordinates: 36°32′39″N 61°09′29″E
- Country: Turkmenistan
- Province: Ahal Province
- Capital: Sarahs

Government
  - häkim: Umyt Myradowiç Gullyýew

Area
  - District: 5,696 km^{2} (2,199 sq mi)

Population (2022 official census)
  - District: 80,643
  - Density: 14.16/km^{2} (36.67/sq mi)
  - Urban: 34,849
  - Rural: 45,794
- Time zone: UTC+5 (+5)
- Area code: (+993 13)

Sarahs District is a district in Ahal Province, Turkmenistan. It is nestled between Altyn asyr District and Mary Province. Its capital city is Sarahs. According to 2022 census, its constituencies had a total population of 80,643 people.

== History ==
On 5 January 2018, Altyn asyr District was abolished by decree. 26,700 hectares were transferred to Sarahs District, including Balykçylyk Rural Council and its only village, Balykçy. On 19 September 2025, the district was re-established and the territorial changes were reverted.

== Administrative Subdivisions ==
Sarahs District includes 11 third-level subdivisions; one city, one town, nine rural councils, including 20 villages:

=== Cities ===
- Sarahs

=== Towns ===
- Gaňňaly

=== Rural Councils ===
- Alam, including one village
- Ata, including one village
- Aşgabat, including one village
- Bagtyýarlyk, including three village
- Galkynyş, including five village
- Hanýap, including one village
- Kiçiaga, including four village
- Parahatçylyk, including three village
- Ýalawaç, including one village

== See also ==
- Districts of Turkmenistan
- Sarahs
