= Tejen =

Tejen Tejen şäheri
- City
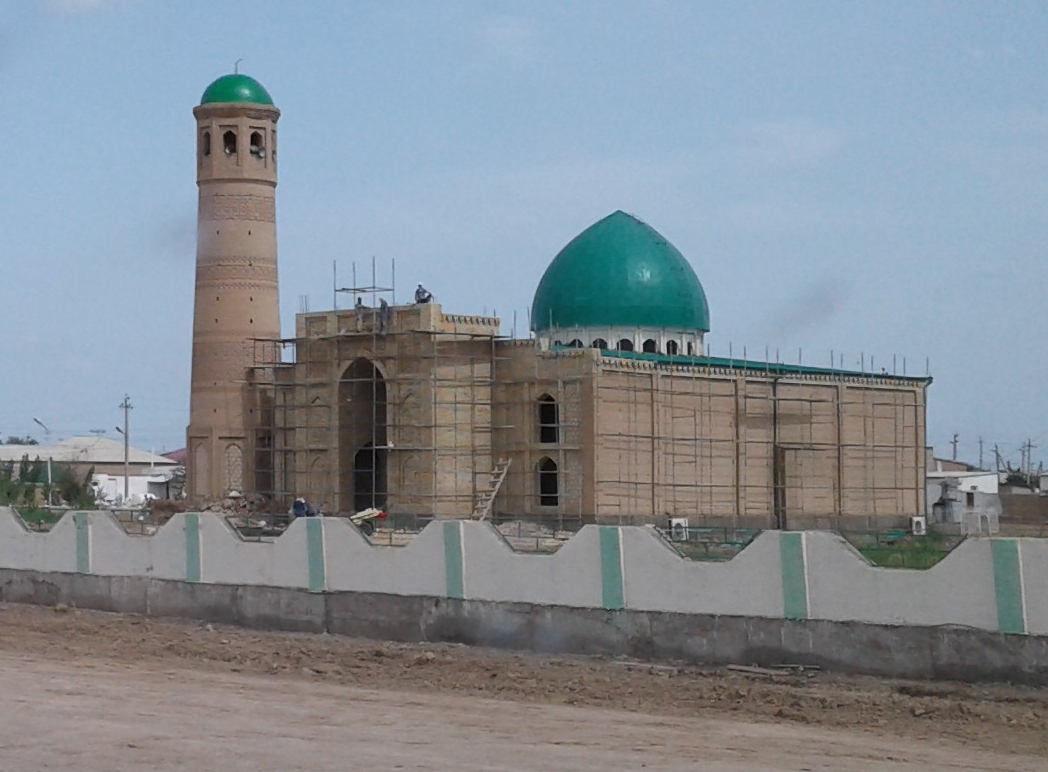
- Mosque under construction in Tejen, Ahal Province, Turkmenistan, in May 2018

- Location in Turkmenistan
- Coordinates: 37°23′N 60°30′E
- Country: Turkmenistan
- Province: Ahal Province
- District: Tejen District
- Elevation: 161 m (528 ft)

Population (2022 official census)
  - Total: 67,488
- Time zone: UTC+05:00 (TMT)

Tejen (older spellings: Tedzhen, Tejend, Tejent) is an oasis city in the Karakum Desert, in Ahal Province of Turkmenistan. It lies along the M37 highway, between Duşak and Mary, 223 kilometres (139 mi) by road southeast of Ashgabat. It has a population of approximately 67,500. To the east is the larger oasis of Mary. Khlopin suggests Tejen may have been the birthplace of Zoroaster.

== Etymology ==
The meaning of tejen is unclear. Atanyyazov explained,

...The meaning of this ancient name is not clear...Barthold noted that this name was also used in the form of Tuzhen in the X-XI centuries...Vambery derived it from the words tei-e hend (tei-e kent, tei— “down”, kent - “village”, “city”) and derived from that “downstream of the city,” “downstream of the city,” or “downstream of the river". He writes that he may have understood the meaning of the word as "city in the desert"...the name of the village along the Gerrud River is mentioned...This name also means "the foot of the city"...As Barthold rightly points out, this name is not the name of the first river, but the name of the county, village, or land, for the river itself is in its upper reaches Hererrud (Herat-rud, i.e., the "Herat River"), and below Sarahs is Khushk-rud, i.e., it was known as the "Waterless River"...In Persian khushk means "dry", "shroud", rud - "river". This name is a characteristic sign of the river, that is, it is associated with the cutting off of its water in the summer.

== History ==
In 1883 it was occupied by General Komarov during the Russian conquest of Turkestan. In 1916, when the Turkmens participated in a revolt against the Russians, Tejen was a hotbed of activity.

Tejen was downgraded from a city with district status to a city in a district on 9 November 2022 by parliamentary decree.

== Climate ==
Climate data for Tejen (1991–2020)
Month	Jan	Feb	Mar	Apr	May	Jun	Jul	Aug	Sep	Oct	Nov	Dec	Year
Record high °C (°F)	27.6 (81.7)	32.2 (90.0)	40.2 (104.4)	41.2 (106.2)	42.0 (107.6)	46.3 (115.3)	45.1 (113.2)	45.2 (113.4)	41.1 (106.0)	41.3 (106.3)	36.4 (97.5)	28.4 (83.1)	46.3 (115.3)
Mean maximum °C (°F)	21.7 (71.1)	24.7 (76.5)	31.1 (88.0)	36.0 (96.8)	39.4 (102.9)	42.5 (108.5)	43.2 (109.8)	42.3 (108.1)	38.9 (102.0)	35.0 (95.0)	27.7 (81.9)	22.3 (72.1)	33.7 (92.7)
Daily mean °C (°F)	4.1 (39.4)	6.5 (43.7)	12.0 (53.6)	18.3 (64.9)	24.5 (76.1)	29.2 (84.6)	30.8 (87.4)	28.7 (83.7)	23.3 (73.9)	16.6 (61.9)	10.0 (50.0)	5.0 (41.0)	17.4 (63.3)
Mean minimum °C (°F)	−7.0 (19.4)	−6.2 (20.8)	−0.8 (30.6)	4.5 (40.1)	11.1 (52.0)	15.7 (60.3)	17.5 (63.5)	14.8 (58.6)	9.4 (48.9)	2.0 (35.6)	−2.9 (26.8)	−6.2 (20.8)	4.3 (39.7)
Record low °C (°F)	−18.1 (−0.6)	−19.4 (−2.9)	−5.5 (22.1)	−0.5 (31.1)	2.6 (36.7)	11.9 (53.4)	14.0 (57.2)	9.6 (49.3)	6.2 (43.2)	−4.0 (24.8)	−11.7 (10.9)	−19.4 (−2.9)	−19.4 (−2.9)
Average precipitation mm (inches)	20.6 (0.81)	26.0 (1.02)	35.4 (1.39)	22.6 (0.89)	16.0 (0.63)	0.9 (0.04)	0.3 (0.01)	1.2 (0.05)	0.7 (0.03)	6.6 (0.26)	15.7 (0.62)	12.8 (0.50)	158.8 (6.25)
Average precipitation days (≥ 1.0 mm)	13.3	17.0	16.8	12.2	9.3	0.9	0.6	0.4	0.7	4.2	11.1	9.1	95.6
Source: NOAA

== Economy ==
Tejen is known for its melon production, and contains numerous textile factories. The city features one hotel, the Hotel Tejen. Tejen is the site of the $240 million Tejen Carbamide (urea) Plant, inaugurated on March 18, 2005, with a design capacity of 350,000 tonnes of urea per year. It is also known for its narcotics, which are known locally as "Tejen tea".

== Government installations ==
A prison is located in Tejen.

== Landmarks ==
The city contains the Charman Ahun Mosque and the Hotel Tejen.

== Wildlife ==
Historical records indicate that the Caspian tiger was found in this region.

== Transport ==
It is a stop on the Trans-Caspian railway, and in the 1996 a new rail line via Sarahs to Mashhad in Iran was opened. Tejen is located on the M37 highway, and the P-7 highway leads south from Tejen to Sarahs and onward to Iran.

=== Autobahn ===
Tejen is linked to Aşgabat, Mary, Türkmenabat and neighbouring countries by the country's 970 km motorway network.

== See also ==
- Railway stations in Turkmenistan
