= Sarahs =

Sarahs Sarahs şäheri
- City
- Location in Turkmenistan
- Coordinates: 36°32′N 61°13′E
- Country: Turkmenistan
- Province: Ahal Province
- District: Sarahs District
- Elevation: 285 m (935 ft)

Population (2022 official census)
  - Total: 31,269
- Time zone: UTC+5

Sarahs (Turkmen pronunciation: [θɑˈɾɑχθ], also written Saraghs, Serahs, Sarakhs, Saragt, or Serakhs, the last a backformation of Russian: Серахс) is an oasis city in Ahal Province, Turkmenistan, and the administrative center of Sarahs district. It is one of the oases of the ancient Silk Road lying between Merw to the east and Mashhad to the west. In 2022, the city had a population of 31,269.

== Etymology ==
In Soviet times called Saragt in Turkmen, the city was referred to as Sarahs in antiquity and continuously to the present by locals. The meaning is unknown, but medieval historians asserted that it was a person's name.

== History ==
The Sarahs Oasis surrounding the town has been inhabited since 2nd millennium BCE. The main administrative centre was Old Serakhs, located in a slightly raised area somewhat south of the towns's present location. At the original site there remain a few brick fragments of the former citadel. The town claims to have been founded in 507 BCE. Although this is considered to be a somewhat arbitrary choice of date, the city duly celebrated its 2500th anniversary in 1993. During the Sassanid period a Zoroastrian fire temple was constructed in Mele Hairam, about 15 km east of the town. It has been excavated by Polish archaeologists from Warsaw University since 1997. In the Seljuk Era a famous school of architects was located in Sarahs, along with a mausoleum commemorating the 11th century sufi Abul Fazl (Serakhs Baba). In 1089 Yarty Gumbez mausoleum was constructed 8 km south of the town, possibly as a burial site for Sheikh Ahmed Al Khady.

The modern settlement was established in 1884 when Sarahs Oasis was annexed by the Russian Empire. It served as a Russian military post at the Iranian border. It was inhabited mainly by settlers of Russian and Polish origin. An Orthodox church, which no longer survives, was constructed in the town.

In 2010 monuments of Sarahs, including Old Serakhs, the Abul Fazl mausoleum, and the Mele Hairam temple complex were inscribed on the Tentative List to become UNESCO World Heritage Sites as a part of the "Silk Roads Sites in Turkmenistan" entry by the Turkmen government.

== Climate ==
Sarahs has a borderline hot semi-arid climate (Köppen climate classification BSh)/hot arid climate (BWh), with cool winters and sweltering, rainless summers. Rainfall is generally light and erratic, and occurs mainly in the winter and spring months.

Climate data for Serakhs (1991-2020, extremes 1903-present)
Month	Jan	Feb	Mar	Apr	May	Jun	Jul	Aug	Sep	Oct	Nov	Dec	Year
Record high °C (°F)	29.5 (85.1)	32.9 (91.2)	39.9 (103.8)	43.3 (109.9)	45.7 (114.3)	47.3 (117.1)	48.2 (118.8)	47.3 (117.1)	45.7 (114.3)	44.3 (111.7)	36.2 (97.2)	33.0 (91.4)	48.2 (118.8)
Mean daily maximum °C (°F)	11.0 (51.8)	13.0 (55.4)	18.7 (65.7)	25.6 (78.1)	32.5 (90.5)	37.3 (99.1)	39.0 (102.2)	37.4 (99.3)	32.6 (90.7)	26.0 (78.8)	17.7 (63.9)	12.2 (54.0)	25.3 (77.5)
Daily mean °C (°F)	5.5 (41.9)	7.2 (45.0)	12.3 (54.1)	18.5 (65.3)	25.0 (77.0)	29.9 (85.8)	31.6 (88.9)	29.5 (85.1)	24.4 (75.9)	18.0 (64.4)	11.1 (52.0)	6.7 (44.1)	18.3 (65.0)
Mean daily minimum °C (°F)	1.4 (34.5)	2.6 (36.7)	7.1 (44.8)	12.6 (54.7)	18.0 (64.4)	22.4 (72.3)	24.1 (75.4)	22.1 (71.8)	17.2 (63.0)	11.3 (52.3)	5.9 (42.6)	2.4 (36.3)	12.3 (54.1)
Record low °C (°F)	−25.6 (−14.1)	−23.3 (−9.9)	−11.4 (11.5)	−3.0 (26.6)	2.6 (36.7)	9.0 (48.2)	12.1 (53.8)	9.7 (49.5)	2.1 (35.8)	−7.9 (17.8)	−15.3 (4.5)	−22.1 (−7.8)	−25.6 (−14.1)
Average precipitation mm (inches)	29 (1.1)	33 (1.3)	43 (1.7)	30 (1.2)	12 (0.5)	0.8 (0.03)	0.2 (0.01)	0.1 (0.00)	0.9 (0.04)	5 (0.2)	15 (0.6)	17 (0.7)	186 (7.38)
Average precipitation days (≥ 1 mm)	4.8	5.5	6.0	3.9	2.5	1.0	0.1	0.1	0.2	1.1	3.0	3.3	31.3
Average relative humidity (%)	70.1	66.8	59.9	51.3	38.9	26.9	25.3	24.2	29.3	40.5	59.4	70.7	46.9
Mean monthly sunshine hours	146.8	141.5	172.7	213.0	302.2	359.5	378.7	358.9	315.1	256.0	191.7	145.8	2,981.9
Source 1: Pogoda.ru.net, climatebase.ru (humidity)
Source 2: NOAA

== Transportation ==
Sarahs is a crossing point on the Iranian-Turkmen border and the place where bogies must be changed on the freight railway line from Tejen to Mashhad in Iran, which was opened in 1996. The passenger connection between Sarahs and Ashgabat is also operated. The airport at Sarahs is out of service.

== See also ==
- Railway stations in Turkmenistan
