= Anau, Turkmenistan =

Änew Änew şäheri
- City
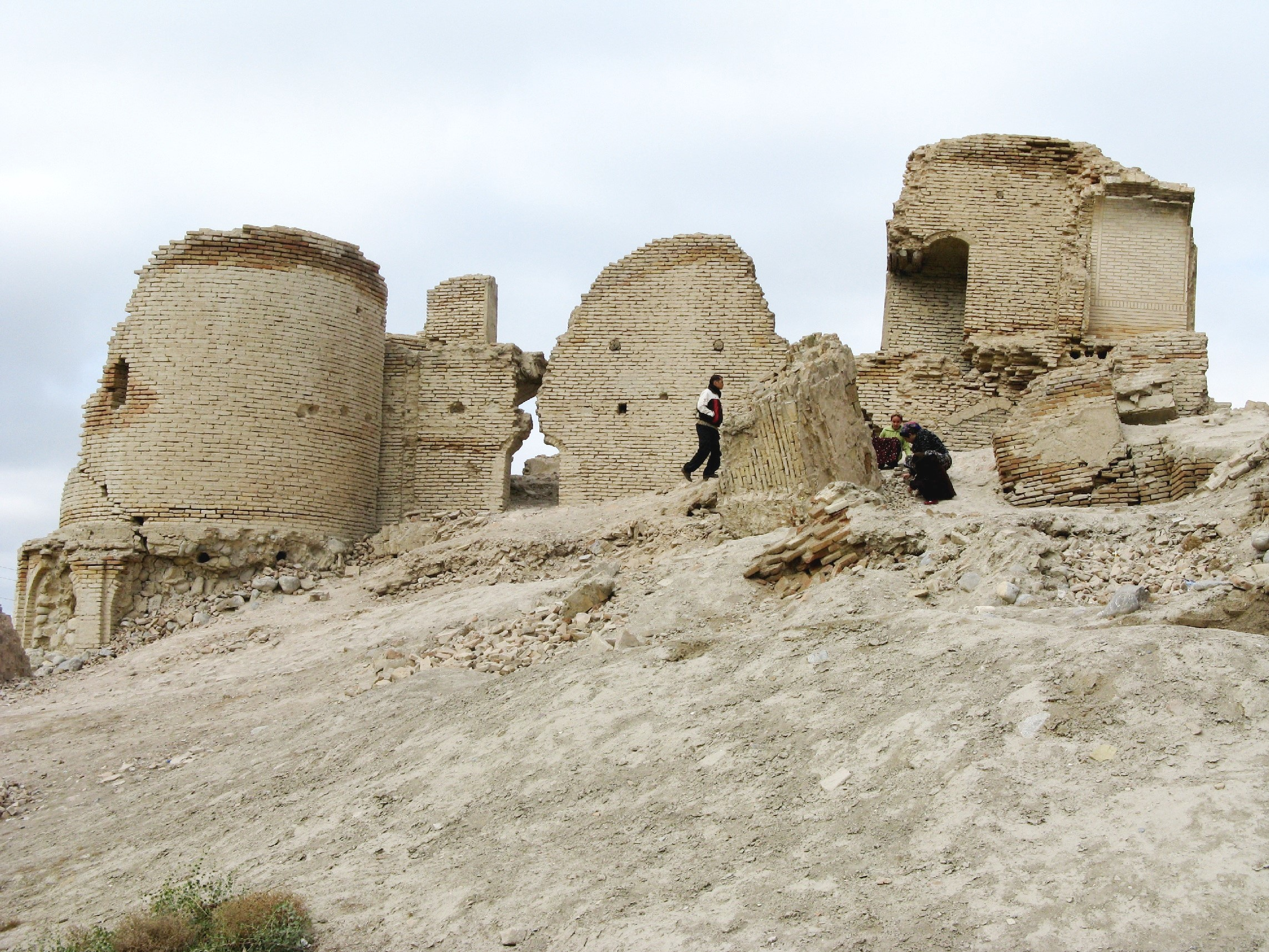
- Ruins of Seýit Jemaladdin Mosque near Anau

- Location in Turkmenistan
- Coordinates: 37°53′N 58°32′E
- Country: Turkmenistan
- Province: Ahal Province
- District: Ak bugdaý District

Population (2022 official census)
  - Total: 28,653
- Time zone: UTC+5

Anau (Turkmen: Änew, Russian: Аннау, romanized: Annau) is a city in Turkmenistan. Until 20 December 2022, it was the capital of Ahal Province. The area has been inhabited since around 5500 BC. Prehistoric sites in Anau were discovered in excavations were conducted by Raphael Pumpelly and William Morris Davis in 1904. In 2022, it had a population of 28,653 people.

== Etymology ==
Anau is the Persian word for "new water".

== Geography ==
Anau is located in the foothills of the Kopet Dag mountain range. It is 8 kilometers (5.0 mi) to the south of Ashgabat.

== History ==
The Chalcolithic Anau culture inhabited the area. Inhabitation in Anau started in its northern area around 5500 BC. This settlement continued until 3000 BC when it moved to the south. This southern location was inhabited from 3000 to 1000 BC.

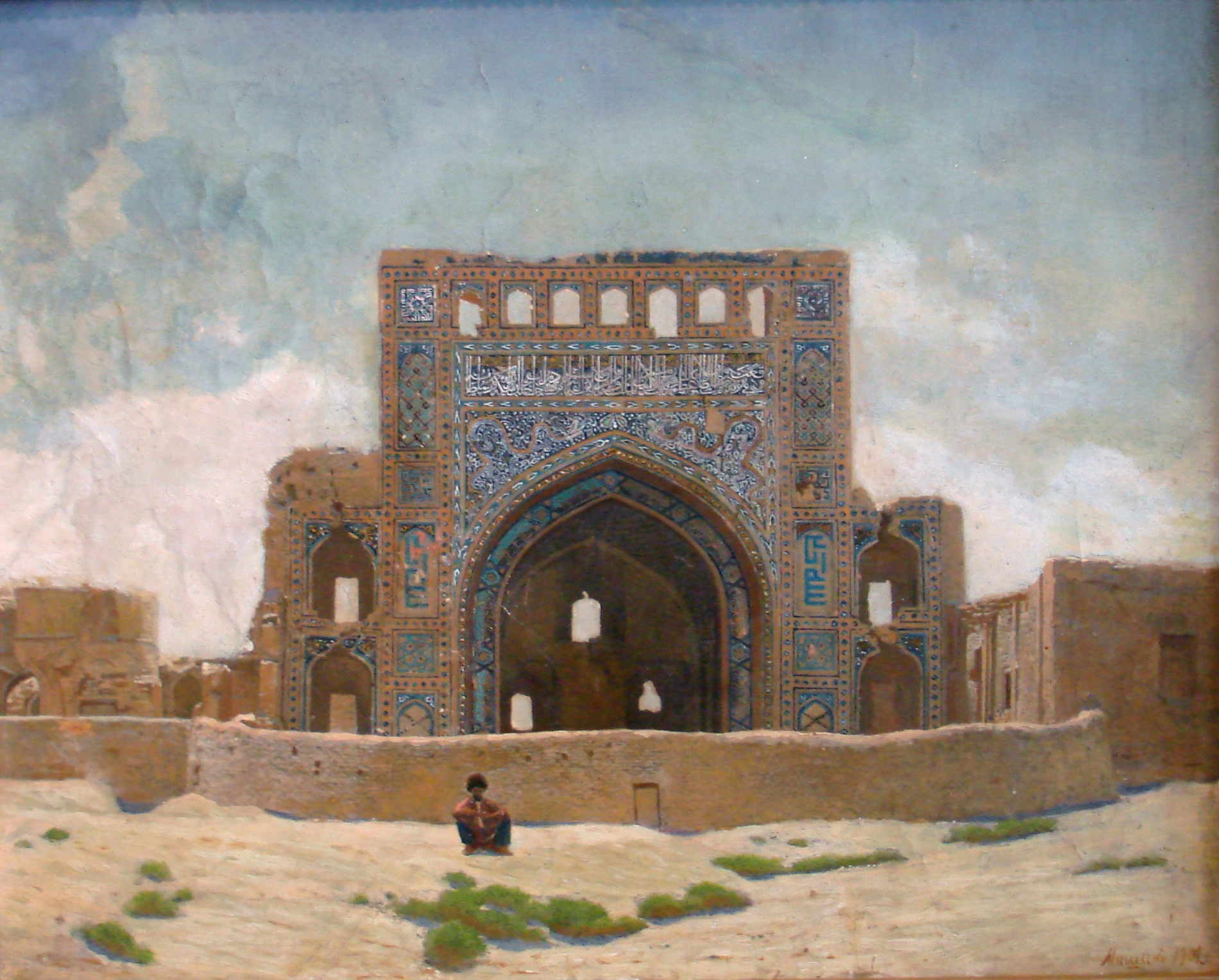
The Anau Mosque, K. S. Mishin, 1902, Museum of Fine Art in Ashgabat.

Between 1456 and 1457, a big mosque was built. The 1948 Ashgabat earthquake destroyed it.

Anau was given city status on 3 February 2008. The city was designated "Cultural Capital of the Turkic World" for 2024 at the 39th session of the Permanent Council of Ministers of Culture of TURKSOY.

== Archaeology ==
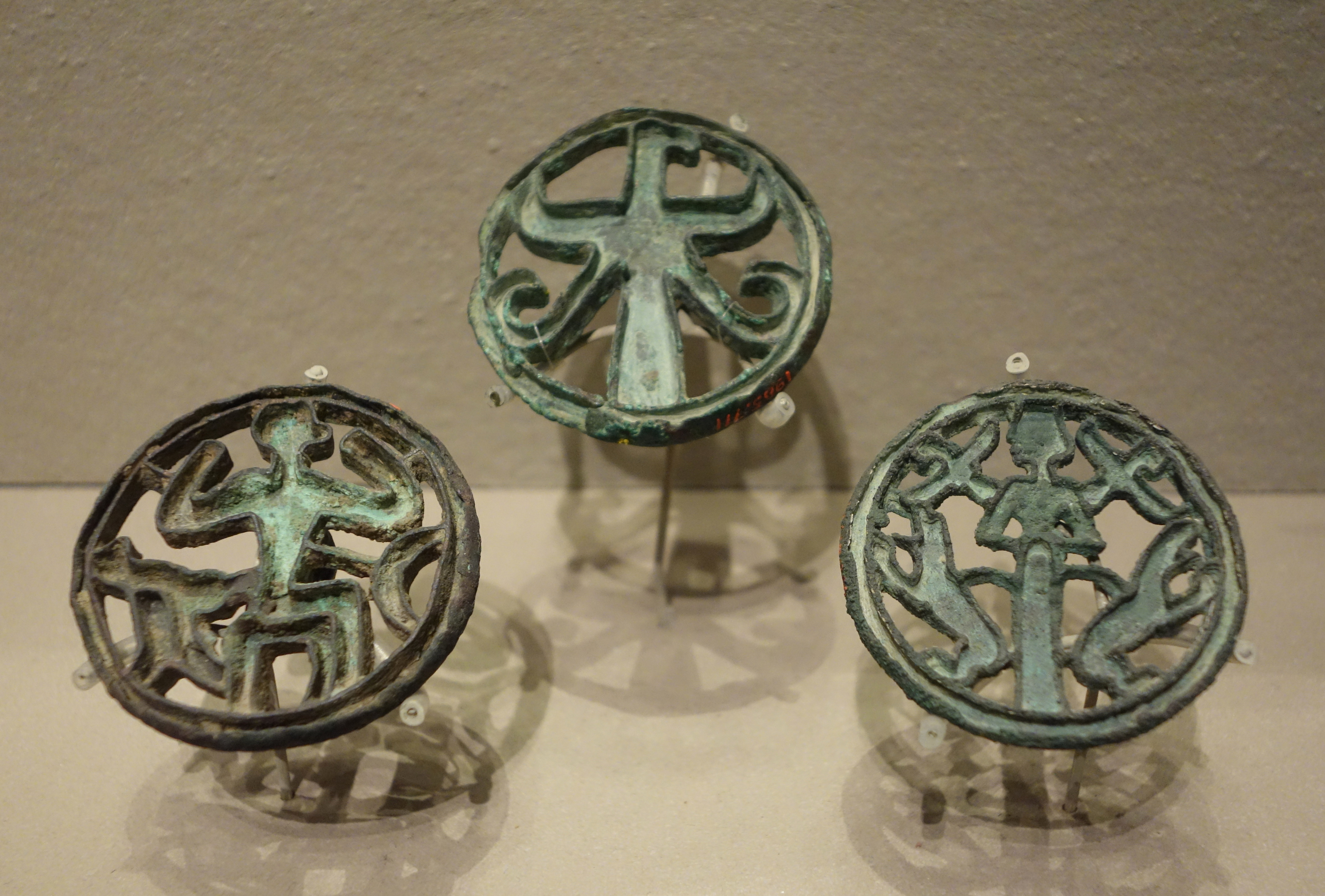
Compartmented seals of eagle, monkey, and goddess, Turkmenistan or northeast Iran, early Bronze Age, c. 2200-1800 BC, bronze - Museum of Fine Arts, Boston

A Russian general explored mounds in the area in 1866, as he believed there was treasure within them. Raphael Pumpelly and William Morris Davis conducted an excavation at Anau in 1904. Hubert Schmidt and Wilhelm Dörpfeld supervised the digging for Pumpelly's excavation. This excavation discovered a prehistoric settlement in Anau. Pumpelly conducted another excavation in 1908. Frank T. Hiebert conducted an excavation of the site in 1993.

Charcoal was abundant in the area between 4500 and 1000 BC. 85-90% of the cereal remains identified in ancient Anau were barley.

== Works cited ==
=== Books ===
- Lachenal, Guillaume (2022). The Doctor Who Would Be King. Duke University Press. doi:10.2307/j.ctv2b6z7x3. ISBN 9781478015246. JSTOR j.ctv2b6z7x3.

=== Journals ===
- Good, Irene (2012). "Changes in Fiber Use and Spinning Technologies on the Iranian Plateau: a comparative and diachronic study of spindle whorls ca 4500-2500 BCE". Paléorient. 38 (1): 111–126. JSTOR 43264566.
- Hiebert, Fredrik (2002). "The Kopet Dag Sequence of Early Villages in Central Asia". Paléorient. 28 (2): 25–41. JSTOR 41496945.
- Miller, Naomi (1999). "Agricultural development in western Central Asia in the Chalcolithic and Bronze Ages". Vegetation History and Archaeobotany. 8 (1): 13–19. JSTOR 23417637.
- Rapp, George (2015). "Raphael Pumpelly (1837-1923): Pioneering Archaeological Geologist in Central Asia". Earth Sciences History. 34 (1): 13–19. JSTOR 44075671.

=== Web ===
- "Официальная хроника: Халк Маслахаты Туркменистана принял Постановление об изменении статуса некоторых городов и поселков Туркменистана". Turkmenistan. 3 February 2008. Archived from the original on 7 January 2009.
