= Duşak =

Duşak Duşak şäherçesi
- Town
- Location in Turkmenistan
- Coordinates: 37°11′39″N 60°0′46″E
- Country: Turkmenistan
- Province: Ahal Province
- District: Kaka District

Population (2022 official census)
  - Town: 20,541
  - Urban: 8,405
  - Rural: 12,136
- Time zone: UTC+5

Duşak is a town on the rim of the Kopet Dag mountains in Kaka District, Ahal Province, Turkmenistan. The town is renowned for the Battle of Duşak between British and Bolshevik forces. President Serdar Berdimuhamedow was first elected to the Assembly of Turkmenistan in the Duşak electoral district in 2016. In 2022, it had a population of 8,405 people.

== Dependencies ==
Duşak as a town has only a single dependent rural village: Şükür bagşy.

== See also ==
- List of municipalities in Ahal Province
- Railway stations in Turkmenistan
- Towns of Turkmenistan
