= Gökdepe District =

District in Ahal Province, Turkmenistan

Coordinates: 38°13′12″N 58°00′36″E

Gökdepe District Gökdepe etraby
- District
- Interactive map of Gökdepe District
- Country: Turkmenistan
- Region: Ahal Region
- Capital: Gökdepe

Government
  - häkim: Oguljemal Nedirowna Şahanowa

Area
  - Total: 16,010 km^{2} (6,180 sq mi)

Population (2022 census)
  - Total: 161,819
  - Density: 10.11/km^{2} (26.18/sq mi)
- Time zone: UTC+5 (+5)

Gökdepe District (Turkmen: Gökdepe etraby) is a district of Ahal Region, Turkmenistan.

== Administrative Subdivisions ==
- Cities (şäherler)
  - Gökdepe
- Towns (şäherçeler)
  - Yzgant (inc. Çaran, Garaajy, Mämmetýar, Sowma)
- Village councils (geňeşlikler)
  - Ahal (Ahal, Çyrla, Gatydüýp, Gorýa, Goşatakyr, Gutlyaýak, Ilek, Syplaňgyzyltakyr, War)
  - Akgoňur (Akgoňur)
  - Babaarap (Babaarap, Ýaýyn)
  - Derweze (Derweze (Formerly Aeroport), Ataguýy, Böri)
  - Gorjaw (Gorjaw)
  - Hurmantgökje (Hurmantgökje)
  - Kelejar (Kelejar)
  - Köpetdag (Köpetdag, Bowga, Bükri, Gutlyaýak, Nowata)
  - Owadandepe (Artykhoja, Ataguýy, Böri, Derweze, G. Orazow adyndaky, Nedir, Porsyguýy, Şapy, Sähra, Talhanly, Ýandakly)
  - Saparmyrat Nyýazow (Saparmyrat Nyýazow, Ajykäriz, Galkynyş, Garrykäriz)
  - Şorgala (Şorgala, Gatydüýp, Haýyr, Işan, Sähetnyýaz)
  - Tagan Baýramdurdyýew (Gökdepe)
  - Türkmenistan (Türkmenistan, Goňurajy, Orazsähet)

== Economy ==
=== Agriculture, food, and feed ===
Farms in the district produce wheat and cotton. Cotton seed is crushed for extraction of oil and meal at the Ahal Vegetable Oil Enterprise plant near Ovadandepe. It was opened on 17 May 2010 with a design capacity to process 96,000 tons of cotton seed per year, with daily production of 50 tons of cottonseed oil, 10 tons of margarine, and 140 tons of cottonseed meal and 70 tons of soybean hulls.

=== Industry ===
On June 28, 2019, a $1.7 billion factory for producing gasoline out of natural gas was commissioned in Ovadandepe, Gökdepe District. Built by Rönesans and Kawasaki using technology from Haldor Topsoe, the factory has a design capacity of 600,000 tonnes of gasoline, 12,000 tonnes of Diesel fuel, and 115,000 tonnes of liquefied petroleum gas per year, produced from 1.7 billion cubic meters of natural gas.

In 2019, Turkmenistan produced 5.1 million standard square meters (4mm thickness) of sheet glass, all of it in Ahal. A$375 million float glass and glass container plant built by Tepe Inşaat of Turkey was opened February 14, 2018, in Ovadandepe north of Ashgabat. It replaced a Soviet-era glass factory located in central Ashgabat. In 2019, the value of Turkmenistan's glass exports as reported by trading partners was $9.5 million.

A steel smelter, Türkmen Demir Önümleri Döwlet Kärhanasy (English: Turkmen Iron Products State Enterprise), operating on scrap metal is located at kilometer 22 on the Ashgabat-Dashoguz Automobile Highway near Ovadandepe. It produces mainly rebar and channel iron.

The Derweze State Electrical Power Station (Turkmen: Derweze Döwlet Elektrik Stansiýasy), a 504.4 megawatt power plant built by Çalık Enerji in 2015, is located near Ovadandepe.

=== Government installations ===
The city of Arkadag, capital of Ahal Province, is located in Gökdepe District, approximately 11 kilometers east of the city of Gökdepe. The Ovadandepe Prison is located approximately 30 kilometers NNW of G. Orazow adyndaky oba, the seat of the Ovadandepe Rural Council (Turkmen: Owadandepe geňeşligi).

== Awards ==
In February 2020 President Gurbanguly Berdimuhamedov awarded a one-million dollar prize to the district as the "best district" in the country for 2019.
