= Kaka District =

Kaka District Kaka etraby Kaakhka District Каахкинский район
- District
- Location within Turkmenistan
- Coordinates: 37.341°N 59.608°E
- Country: Turkmenistan
- Province: Ahal Province
- Capital: Kaka

Government
  - häkim: Eşret Täşliýewiç Täşliýew

Area
  - Total: 10,620 km^{2} (4,100 sq mi)

Population (2022)
  - Total: 93,652
  - Density: 8.818/km^{2} (22.84/sq mi)
- Time zone: UTC+5 (+5)
- Postal code: 745340

Kaka District is a district of Ahal Province, Turkmenistan.

In ancient times the area was a fertile agricultural plain to the north of the Kopet Dag mountain range. A number of important Bronze Age sites exist in the area, such as Ulug Depe and Abiward.

== Administrative Subdivisions ==
- Cities (şäherler)
  - Kaka
- Towns (şäherçeler)
  - Duşak (inc. Şukur bagşy)
- Village councils (geňeşlikler)
  - Arapgala (Arapgala)
  - Artyk (Artyk)
  - Çäçe (Çäçe)
  - Garahan (Garahan
  - Gowşut (Gowşut, Gowşut bekedi)
  - Gozgan (Gozgan)
  - Harçiňňan (Harçiňňan)
  - Kürengala (Kürengala, Soltandeşt)
  - Mäne (Mäne)
  - Mehinli (Mehinli, Bükriölen, Kyrkguýy, Haşşan, Hojameňli, Hümmetli, Bulanyk, Köpguýy, Kümeli)
