= List of railway stations in Turkmenistan =

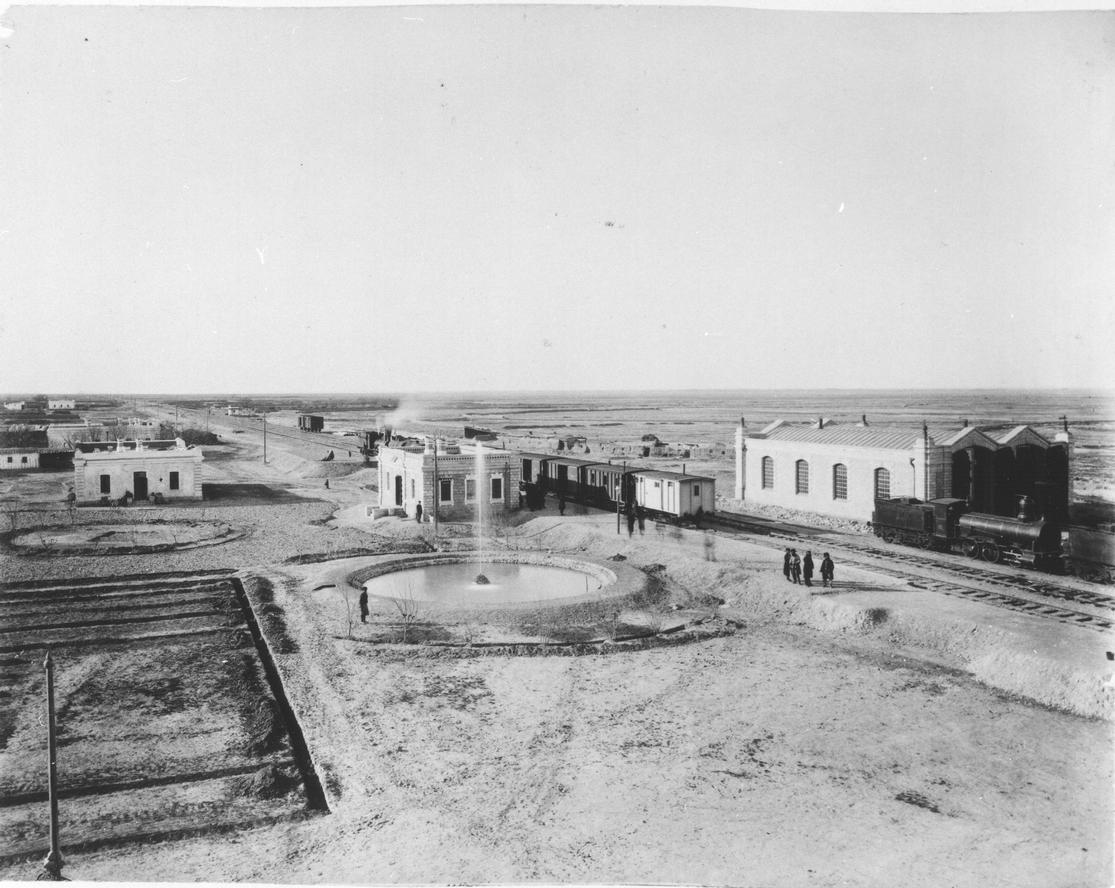
The station of Bamy on the Trans-Caspian Railway, c.1890

Railway stations in Turkmenistan include:

== Maps ==
- UN Map
- UNHCR Map

== Municipalities served by rail ==
=== Trans-Caspian Railway ===
- Turkmenbashy
- Balkanabat
- Bereket
- Serdar
- Bamy
- Baherden
- Büzmeýin
- Ashgabat - national capital - junction
- Artyk (border crossing into Iran)
- Dushak
- Tejen
- Parahat - junction
- Mary - junction
- Baýramaly
- Türkmenabat - junction
- Farap
- (border crossing into Uzbekistan)

==== Tejen-Sarahs branch line ====
- Parahat - junction
- Sarahs, Turkmenistan
- (border crossing into Iran)
- Sarakhs, Iran - break-of-gauge, bogies exchange.

==== Mary-Serhetabat branch line ====
- Mary - junction
- Ýolöten
- Ymambaba
- Sandykgaçy
- Galaýmor
- Serhetabat
- (border crossing into Afghanistan)
- Torghundi, Afghanistan

==== Türkmenabat-Kerki branch line ====
- Türkmenabat - junction
- Saýat
- Garabekewül
- Pelwert
- Halaç
- Kerki - junction

- Samarqand
- border - Uzbekistan
- Amu Dar'ya
- Kerki - junction
- Köýtendag
- Kelif
- border - Uzbekistan

- Kerki - junction
- Ymamnazar
- (border crossing into Afghanistan)
- Aqina
- Andkhoy

=== Türkmenabat-Daşoguz Line (former Çärjew-Moscow line) ===
- Türkmenabat - junction
- Darganata
- Gazojak
- (short border crossing into Uzbekistan)
- Daşoguz
- Boldumsaz
- (border crossing into Uzbekistan)

=== Trans-Karakum Railway ===
- Ashgabat - junction
- Ovadandepe
- Içoguz
- Daşoguz

=== North-South Transnational Corridor ===
- Bolashak, Kazakhstan
- (border crossing from Kazakhstan)
- Serhetýak
- Bereket - junction
- Döwletýar
- Bugdaýly
- Etrek
- Akýaýla
- (border crossing into Iran) - break-of-gauge, bogies exchange.

== See also ==
- International North–South Transport Corridor
- Rail transport in Turkmenistan
- Trans-Caspian railway
- Trans-Karakum Railway
- Transport in Turkmenistan
- Türkmendemirýollary
