= Ministry of Railways (Turkmenistan) =

Turkmen government agency

Ministry of Railways of Turkmenistan
- Türkmenistanyň Demir ýol ulaglary ministrligi

Agency overview
- Formed: 11 July 2025
- Preceding agency: Turkmen Railways Agency
- Headquarters: Ashgabat, Turkmenistan
- Employees: ~7,000
- Annual budget: 1.626 billion manats (2018)
- Child agency: "Demirýollary" AGPJ
- Website: https://turkmendemiryollary.gov.tm/

Ministry of Railways Demir ýol ulaglary ministrligi
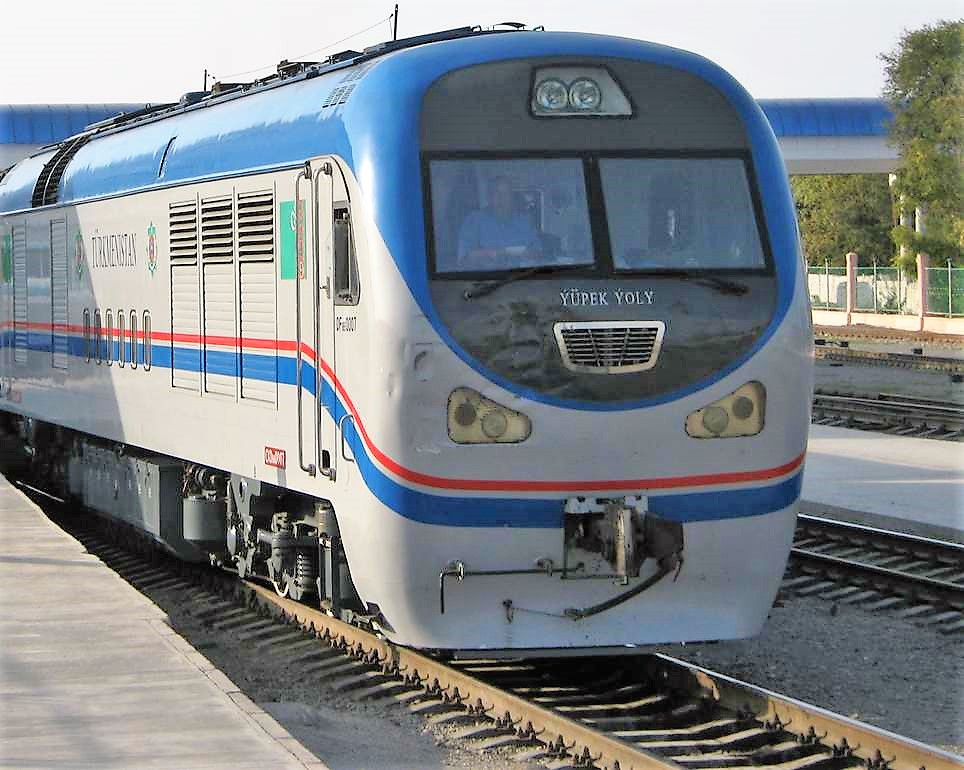
- Turkmen Railways' diesel locomotive CKD9A of Chinese origin

Overview
- Locale: Turkmenistan
- Dates of operation: 1991–
- Predecessor: Central Asian Rail Line (USSR)

Technical
- Track gauge: 1,520 mm (4 ft 11 27/32 in)
- Length: 4,980 km (3,090 mi)

Other
- Website: turkmendemiryollary.gov.tm

The Turkmenistan Ministry of Railways (Turkmen: Türkmenistanyň Demir ýol ulaglary ministrligi is a government agency in Turkmenistan responsible for oversight of the state rail corporation "Demirýollary" AGPJ. It was reconstituted out of the Turkmenistan railway agency on 11 July 2025.

== History ==
=== Russian Empire ===
In September 1880, the first section of the railway was built from the eastern coast of the Caspian Sea to Mollagara. In October 1881, rails were laid to the village of Gyzylarbat. Construction of the second section of the railway continued in 1885 and 1886 to large settlements of Turkmenistan: Gökdepe, Ashgabat, Tejen, Mary, and Çärjew, ending at the Amu Darya.

At the end of 1887, a wooden bridge with a length of more than 2 km was built across the Amu Darya, which allowed construction of the third section of the railroad to begin. In 1888, the railway continued to Samarkand and in 1898 brought to Tashkent. Between 1894 and 1895, the Krasnovodsk (today's Türkmenbaşy) section of the railroad was completed. Thus, the Trans-Caspian Railway, which played an important role in the development of the economy of Central Asia, including pre-revolutionary Turkmenistan, begins from the harbor of the Caspian Sea, Krasnovodsk Bay (today's Türkmenbaşy Bay). The route from Krasnovodsk to Tashkent was called the Central Asian Railway.

In 1901, the wooden bridge over the Amu Darya was destroyed by flood waters. It was replaced with a steel bridge built on stone supports.

=== Soviet Union ===
In 1922, on the instructions of Vladimir Lenin, work began on the design of Soviet diesel locomotives for operation on waterless sections of Central Asia. In 1931, the Krasnovodsk-Çärjew railway was switched to diesel traction. In 1955, all railway traffic in the Turkmen SSR was completely converted to diesel traction.

A very important role was played by rail during the Second World War. During the battles near Stalingrad and the Caucasus (from August 1942 to February 1943), the Krasnovodsk port and Ashgabat railway station became the only transport arteries connecting Baku, Transcaucasia and the Black Sea with the whole country. They ensured the transfer of the army, a huge flow of military equipment and equipment to the North Caucasian and Transcaucasian fronts. For the selfless work of the railway workers of the Turkmen SSR, the Red Banner of the People's Commissariat of Railways of the USSR was repeatedly awarded.

In the post-war period, improvement of the railway network infrastructure continued, increasing its carrying capacity. At almost all stations and crossings, passenger buildings, platforms and canopies were constructed. Air conditioned railcars were also commissioned, improving passenger comfort. Turkmen railways were among the first in the USSR to introduce diesel traction. In the early 1980s, the Mary-Guşgy line was extended to the Afghan village of Torghundi.

=== Turkmenistan ===
Türkmendemirýollary was formed after the dissolution of the Soviet Union, as one of the heirs of Soviet Railways. The railway's most important station is Ashgabat railway station, the central station of the capital. After the collapse of the USSR, the construction of new lines again intensified, forced by the fact that the previous routes were interrupted by sections that became part of the Uzbek railways and therefore crossed international boundaries. During the period after the collapse of the USSR, a number of new trunk lines were opened in Turkmenistan: Takhiatash (Uzbekistan)-Köneürgenç-Saparmyrat Türkmenbaşy, Türkmenabat-Kerki-Kerkiçi, Tejen-Sarakhs (Iran), Ashgabat-Daşoguz, which made it possible to connect disparate sections of the railway network into a unified whole.

On March 3, 1992, the "Great President of Turkmenistan" Saparmyrat Nyýazow approved the Regulation "On the Turkmen Railway", according to which the Turkmen Railway was defined as a legal entity, a single production and economic complex operating on the principles of full-cost accounting and self-financing, combining economic management methods with centralized management of the transportation process.

June 28, 1993 by the decree of the Great President of Turkmenistan Saparmyrat Nyýazow in order to improve the management structure of the railway complex of Turkmenistan, ensure its entry into the international railway system, coordinate the activities of enterprises, organizations and associations involved in the transportation process, open new railway lines on the basis of the Turkmen railway the State Railway of Turkmenistan was formed.

On February 4, 1997, the State Railway of Turkmenistan was renamed into the Railways Directorate Turkmendemirýollary.

The Railways Directorate was reorganized into the Ministry of Railways (Turkmen: Türkmenistanyň Demir ýol ulaglary ministrligi) in September 2003 by decree of President Saparmyrat Nyýazow.

In 2017, construction was completed of a new rail bridge over the Amu Darya, replacing a bridge built in 1905.

The Ministry of Railways was reduced in status 29 January 2019 to an agency of the Ministry of Industry and Communications (in turn later reformed into the Ministry of Industry and Construction). It was restored to ministry status on 11 July 2025 by presidential decree.

== Railways projects ==
=== First link to Iran ===
In 1996, the Mashhad–Sarakhs extension connected Iran to Turkmenistan, as part of the Silk Road railway for linking the landlocked Central Asian countries to the Persian Gulf. Railways in former states of the Soviet Union use 1,520 mm (4 ft 11 27/32 in) Russian gauge, and thus the Iranian Railways maintain break-of-gauge services at borders with Azerbaijan and Turkmenistan, in addition to short wide-track rail segments to the border crossings.

=== Kazakhstan-Turkmenistan-Iran railway (part of the North-South Transport Corridor) ===
Türkmendemirýollary participates in the rail project to link China and Southeast Asia to Europe over a length of 3,900 kilometres (2,400 mi) via the North-South Transport Corridor, which connects Kazakhstan to Iran via Turkmenistan using the Russian rail gauge. Iran is linked to Turkey and Europe's standard-gauge system. In December 2014 the rail line linking Iran to Kazakhstan via Turkmenistan was opened, creating the first direct rail link between Iran and China. Upon completion of the Marmaray rail project, direct rail transport between China and Europe while avoiding Russia will be possible.

=== Afghanistan–Turkmenistan rail service ===
A 10-kilometer long line extends from Serhetabat in Turkmenistan to Torghundi in Afghanistan. An upgrade of this 1960s-vintage Soviet-built line, using Russian gauge, began in 2007. In April 2016, an agreement was reached for a technical feasibility study for a proposal to extend this line approximately 100 km to Herat, where it could connect to the standard-gauge line to Khaf, Iran that is being built. In accordance with earlier decisions, the line is likely to be standard gauge, with break of gauge at Torghundi. In April 2018 the Turkmen government decided to build a railway from Galkynysh Gas Field in the direction of Afghanistan, towards Torghundi.

Another rail line was opened farther east in November 2016, connecting Aqina in Faryab province via Ymamnazar with Kerki in Turkmenistan. A planned 58 kilometres (36 mi) extension to Andkhoy has been proposed. It is planned to become part of a rail corridor through northern Afghanistan, connecting it via Sheberghan to Mazar-i Sharif and on to the border with Tajikistan, although it is unclear when this will happen.

== Location ==
744000, Türkmenistan, Aşgabat, Arçabil şaýoly, 162

== See also ==
- Rail transport in Turkmenistan
- Türkmendemirýollary
