= Çarşaňňy =

Çarşaňňy Çarşaňňy obasy
- Village
- Location in Turkmenistan
- Coordinates: 37°30′16″N 66°00′16″E
- Country: Turkmenistan
- Province: Lebap Province
- District: Köýtendag District
- Rural council: Garnas geňeşligi

Population (2022 official census)
  - Total: 2,601
- Time zone: UTC+5

Çarşaňňy, formerly known as Dostluk, is a village in Köýtendag District, Lebap Province, Turkmenistan. The village is located in the very outskirts of the city of Köýtendag, in the far-eastern part of Turkmenistan, near the border with Afghanistan. In 2022, it had a population of 2,601 people.

== Etymology ==
According to Atanyýazow, father of former President S. Nyýazow, Çarşaňňy is the name of a Turkmen tribe.

== History ==
On 7 July 2016, the village of Dostluk was designated as the center of Garnas Rural Council, replacing Garnas itself.

On 9 November 2022, the village of Dostluk was renamed Çarşaňňy.

== Rural Council ==
The village is the center of the Garnas Rural Council along with three other villages:

- Çarşaňňy, village
- Balh, village
- Garabagşyly, village
- Garnas, village

== See also ==
- List of cities, towns and villages in Turkmenistan
- List of municipalities in Lebap Province
