= Ashgabat railway station =

Railway station in Ashgabat, Turkmenistan

Coordinates: 37°56′35″N 58°23′45″E

Ashgabat
- View of the station's main entrance

General information
- Location: Gurbansoltan eje Avenue, Berkararlyk District, Ashgabat; Turkmenistan
- System: Turkmenistan Railway terminal
- Owner: Demirýollary
- Lines: Trans-Caspian railway Trans-Karakum Railway Lapis Lazuli corridor

Construction
- Accessible: Yes
- Architect: Evsey Sorin (1957)
- Architectural style: Neoclassicism

History
- Opened: 1888
- Rebuilt: 2009

Key dates
- 1957: rebuilt
- 2009: rebuilt
Location

Ashgabat railway station (Turkmen: Aşgabat demirýol menzili) is the main railway station in Ashgabat, Turkmenistan. It was originally built in 1888, but had to be rebuilt after an earthquake in 1948. The station is operated by the Türkmendemirýollary.

== History ==
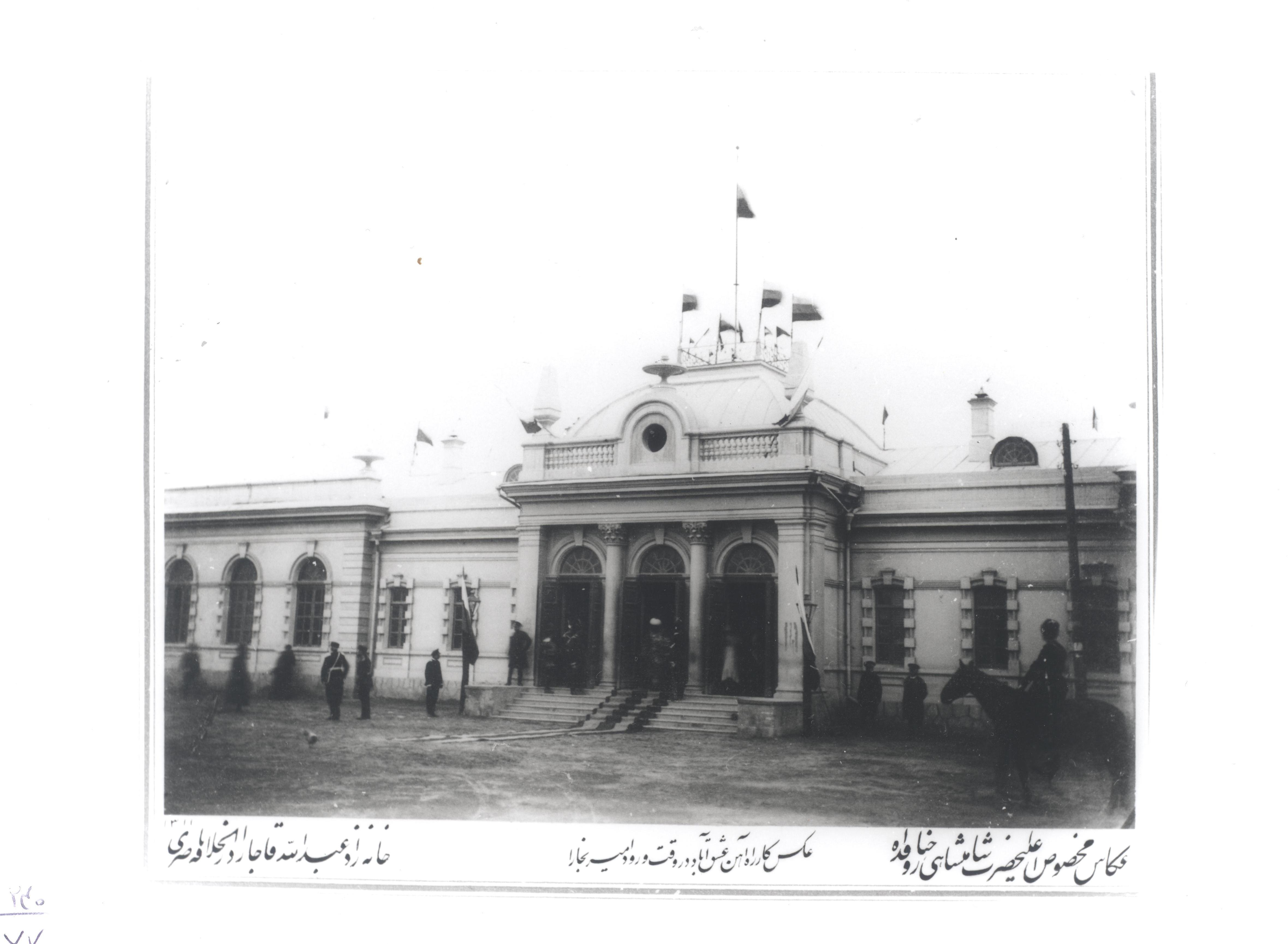
The station in 1894

Ashgabat railway station was constructed in 1888, based on a design by academician Ludwig Urlaub. It was later reconstructed during the Soviet era, but was completely demolished in 1948 by the Ashgabat earthquake. It was rebuilt in 1950 on the foundations of the old railway station. Adjacent to the Ashgabat railway station, the House of Culture for Railway Workers was built between 1950 and 1952, designed by architect Elizaveta Khelaia.

The Ashgabat railway station was designed in a neoclassical style between 1955 and 1957 by architect Evsey Sorin.

In 2009 the building was given a new look. The Turkish company Belda Inşaat ve Taahhüt Ticaret Ltd. Şti. designed and radically reconstructed the railway station. The Ashgabat railway station has been fully renovated with a white marble and granite facade. The dome and spire feature a reinforced structure, while the interior includes a children’s play area, a mother-and-child room, express cafes, and service areas. The redesigned waiting hall is complemented by blue color canopies on platforms for weather protection, and ticket offices have been moved to a nearby building. The forecourt now features an underground pedestrian passage, linking parking areas with the station’s waiting hall and storage facilities.

== Service ==
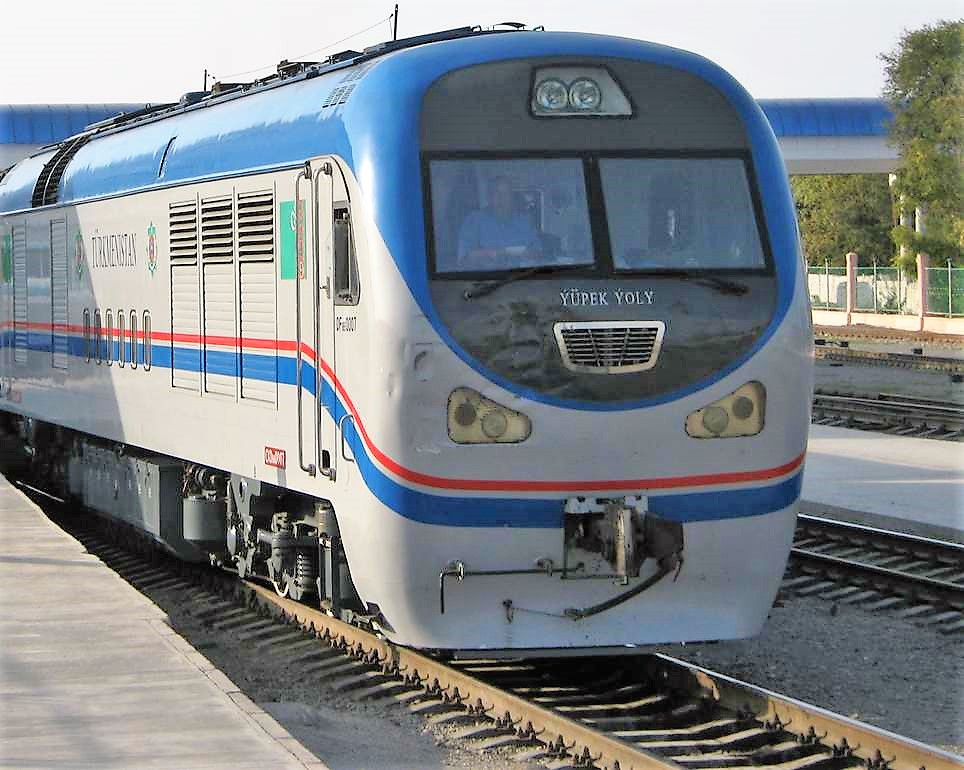
Demirýollary diesel locomotive CKD9A at Ashgabat railway station

There are 7 (4 fast train and 3 regular) train routes for passenger service.

Passenger trains as December 2024:

| Train No | Destination | Distance (km) | Duration |
|---|---|---|---|
| 03 | Türkmenabat | 586 | 12h 58m |
| 13 | Daşoguz | 550 | 11h 55m |
| 33 | Daşoguz | 550 | 11h 25m |
| 601 | Serhetabat | 658 | 16h 53m |
| 606 | Türkmenbaşy | 557 | 14h 22m |
| 93 | Daşoguz | 550 | 11h 35m |
| 95 | Amyderýa | 816 | 17h 42m |

== Gallery ==
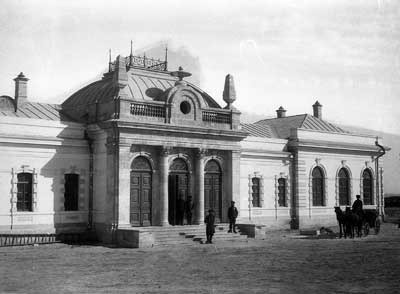
Historical view of the station (early 20th century)

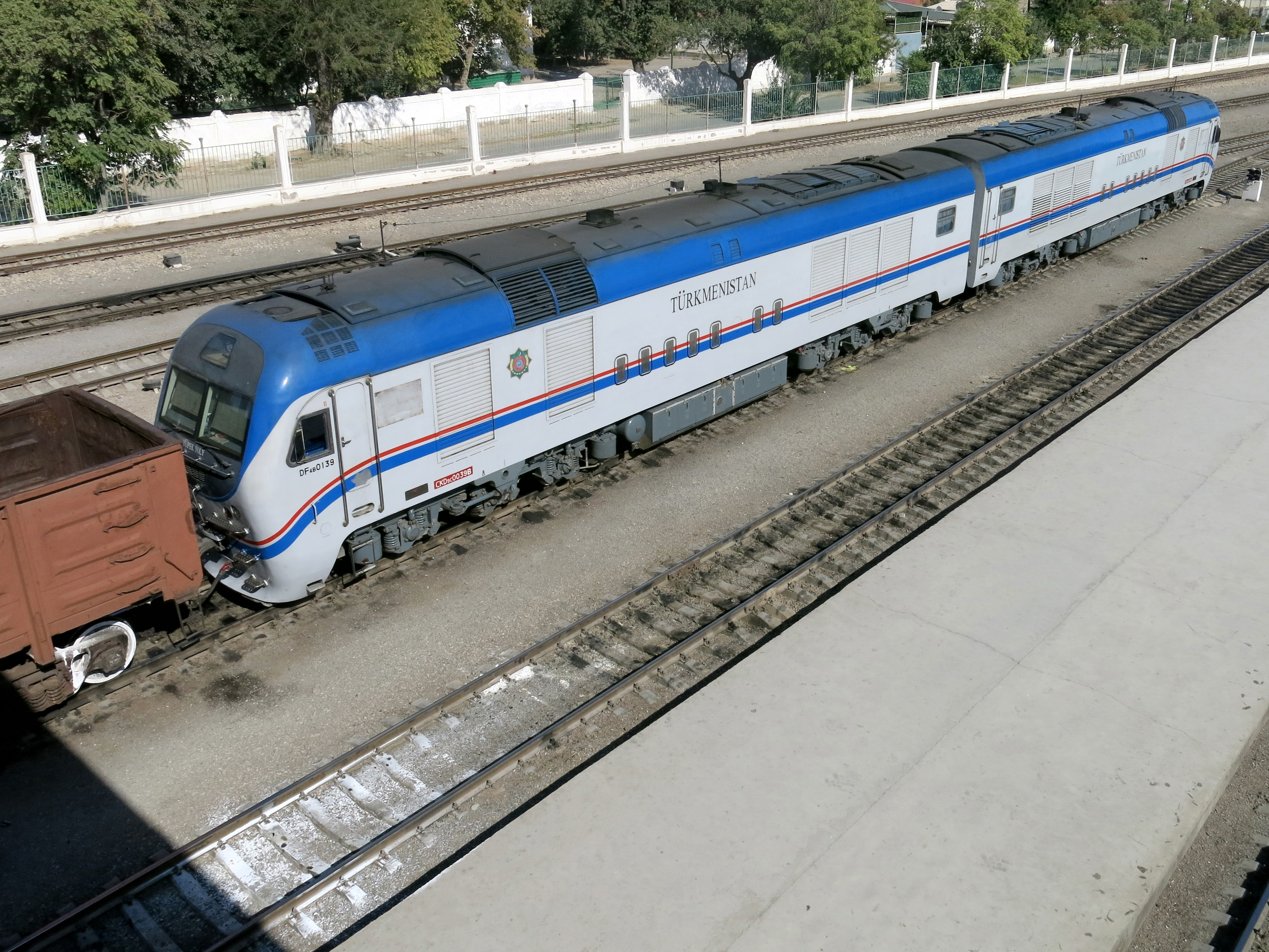
View from a footbridge of the railway tracks in the railway station of Ashgabat in the year 2015

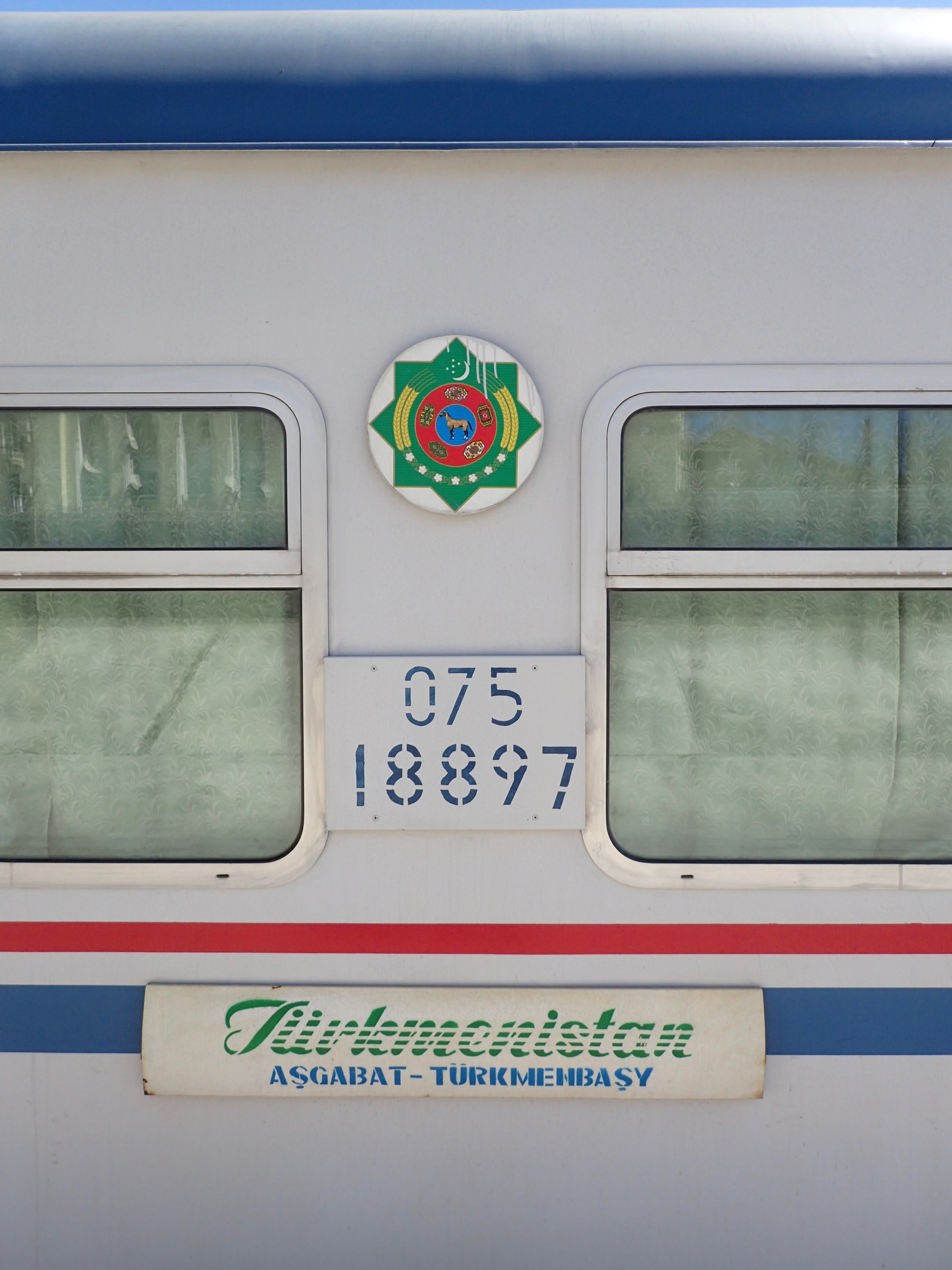
Ashgabat-Turkmenbashi train

The Ashgabat Railway Station photographed from the tracks a bit west of the station

== See also ==
- Transport in Turkmenistan
- Railway stations in Turkmenistan
- Trans-Caspian railway
- Trans-Karakum Railway
- North-South Transnational Railway
