= Gowurdak mine =

Salt mine in Magdanly, Lebap, Turkmenistan

- Location: Magdanly, Lebap Province, Turkmenistan
- Products: Sodium chloride

The Gowurdak mine is a large salt mine located in eastern Turkmenistan in Lebap Province, close to Magdanly. Gowurdak represents one of the largest salt reserves in Turkmenistan having estimated reserves of 1,849 million tonnes of NaCl.
