= Köýtendag District =

Köýtendag District Köýtendag etraby
- District
- Interactive map of Köýtendag District
- Country: Turkmenistan
- Province: Lebap Province
- Capital: Köýtendag

Area
  - District: 1,849 sq mi (4,788 km^{2})

Population (2022 official census)
  - District: 122,523
  - Density: 66.28/sq mi (25.59/km^{2})
  - Urban: 78,007
  - Rural: 44,516
- Time zone: UTC+5 (+5)

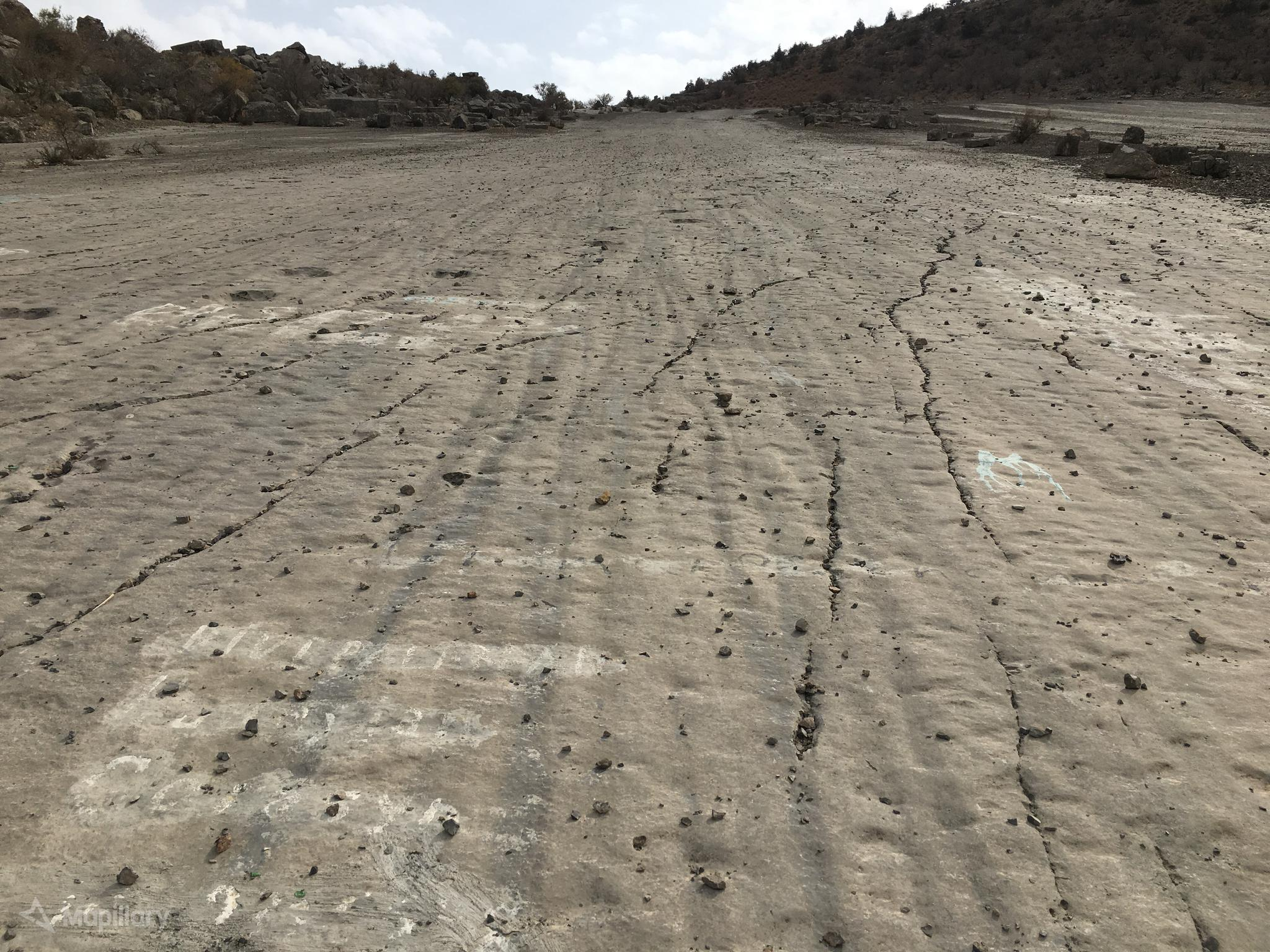
Dinosaur Plateau in Koytendag District, Lebap Province, Turkmenistan

Köýtendag District, formerly known as Çarşaňňy District, is a district of Lebap Province, Turkmenistan. It borders Afghanistan to the south, Uzbekistan to the north and east, but also Döwletli and Kerki Districts. Its administrative center is the city of Köýtendag. According to 2022 census, its constituencies had a total population of 122,523 people.

== History ==
Formed in August 1926 as Çarşaňňy in the then-region (okrug) of Kerki, it came under direct control of the Turkmen SSR government in November 1930, when the aforementioned district was abolished. The region was restored back in February 1933, of which this district was once again a part of. In November 1939, it became part of the newly formed region (okrug) of Çärjew, now known as Lebap.

December 1943 saw the reincorporation of this district into the district of Kerki, and in January 1947 this district became part of Çärjew once again.

This district was abolished in January 1963, but was reestablished in December 1964, of which it came under direct control of the central government of the Turkmen SSR at Ashgabat. When Çärjew was reestablished again in 1970, it again became part of it.

In 1992, this district was incorporated into the newly formed Lebap region; it was soon renamed Köýtendag, as it is known today.

On 9 November 2022, Döwletli District was abolished and its territories were divided between Hojambaz and Köýtendag Districts. 183,540 hectares went to Köýtendag. On 19 September 2025, the district was re-established and all changes were reverted.

== Administrative subdivisions ==
Köýtendag District includes 15 third-level subdivisions, two cities, four towns, and nine rural councils. Those subdivisions include 27 villages:

=== Cities ===
- Köýtendag
- Magdanly

=== Towns ===
- Garlyk, including three villages
- Gurşun magdan käni
- Kelif, including one village
- Mukry

=== Rural Councils ===
- Akgumolam, including one village
- Çärjew, including three villages
- Garahowuz, including one village
- Garnas, including four villages
- Garrygala, including two villages
- Köýten, including six villages
- Megejik, including four villages
- Ters, including one village
- Zarpçy, including one village

== Nature reserve ==
The district contains the Köýtendag Nature Reserve which was established in 1986. It is located in the Köýtendag Range of the district and covers an area of 271.4 km^{2}. The district is also the site of the "Dinosaur Plateau", a prehistoric mudflow which preserves 160-million-year-old footprints of dinosaurs.

== See also ==
- Districts of Turkmenistan
- Köýtendag
