= Rail transport in Turkmenistan =

Railways in Turkmenistan
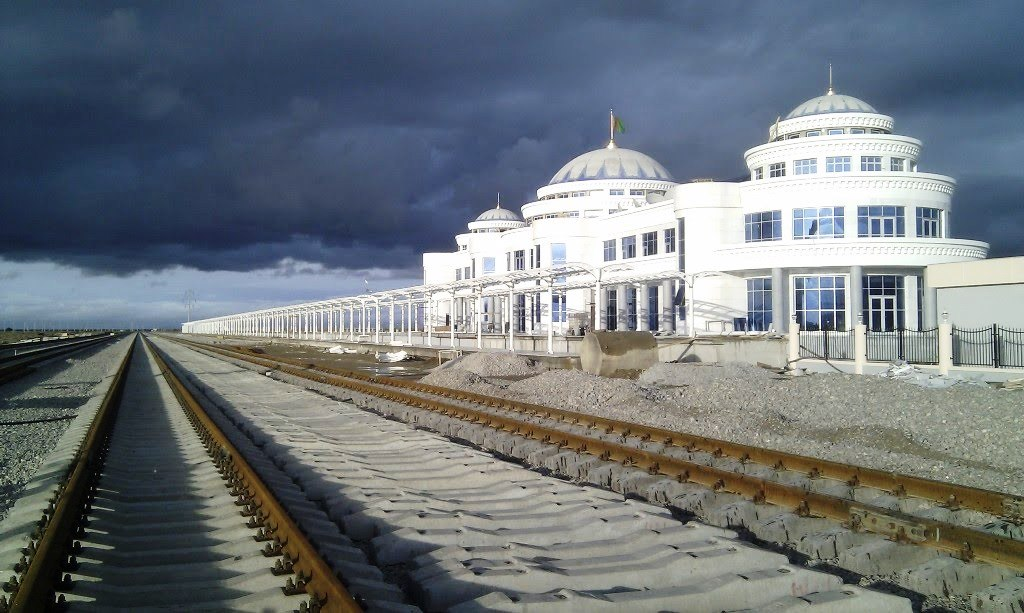
- A newly constructed railway station in Bereket city, October 2013

Operation
- National railway: Demirýollary

System length
- Total: 4,980 kilometres (3,090 mi)

Track gauge
- Main: 1,520 mm (4 ft 11 27/32 in)

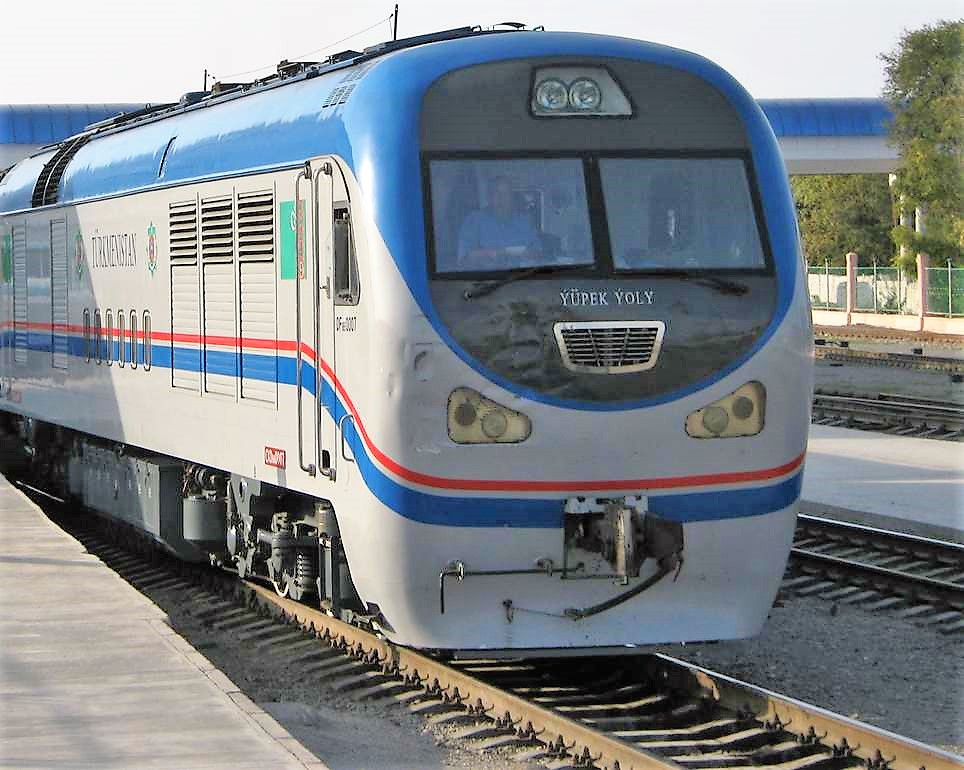
Turkmenistan Railways Diesel locomotive CKD9A

Turkmenistan has 4,980 kilometres (3,090 mi) of railways (37th largest in the world). The railway operator is the state-owned company Türkmendemirýollary (Turkmen Railways). The company belongs to the Ministry of Railways of Turkmenistan. Turkmenistan is currently expanding its rail system to cover 5,256.25 kilometres (3,266.08 mi) more distance, which will take its network to 10,236.25 kilometres (6,360.51 mi) track kilometres by 2025.

== National and International railway system ==
The Turkmen rail system is managed by the government Railways Agency of Turkmenistan (Turkmen: "Türkmendemirýollary" agentligi), which oversees its operational arm, Türkmendemirýollary, formally known as "Demirýollary" AGPJ. Rail gauge is the standard Russian- and Soviet 1520 millimeters.

As of 2020 Turkmenistan had 6,561 kilometres (4,077 mi) of rail line, mostly close to the northern and southern borders. The Tejen–Sarahs–Mashhad railway, built in 1996 by Turkmenistan and Iran, links Central Asian-, Russian-, and European rail systems with Turkey, South Asia and the Persian Gulf. In February 2006, the final construction phase began on the Trans-Karakum Railway, a direct link between Ashgabat and Daşoguz that halves travel time between the southern and northern parts of the country.

The Türkmenabat-Ashgabat-Bereket-Türkmenbaşy route is partly double-tracked; the rest of the network is single-track. There is no electrification; however, the Turkmen railways authority reportedly is considering a proposal from Russia's RZhD International to electrify the Trans-Karakum Railway and the Turkmenbaşy-Türkmenabat portion of the Trans-Caspian Railway. Bereket Railway Station is an important crossroad of the Trans-Caspian railway and North-South Transnational Railway Corridor. It links the Caspian Sea, Turkmenistan, Uzbekistan, and eastern Kazakhstan, and the North-South Transnational Railway links Russia, Kazakhstan, Turkmenistan, Iran, Persian Gulf, and Turkey. The city has a large locomotive maintenance and repair depot and a modern rail station.

The Kazakhstan-Turkmenistan-Iran railway link is a part of the North-South Transnational Corridor and is a 677 km (421 mi) long single-tracked railway line connecting Kazakhstan and Turkmenistan with Iran and the Persian Gulf. It links Uzen in Kazakhstan with Bereket - Etrek in Turkmenistan and ends at Gorgan in Iran's Golestan province. In Iran, the railway is linked to the national network, making its way to the ports of the Persian Gulf as well as to Turkey. The project is estimated to have cost $620 million, which was jointly funded by the governments of Kazakhstan, Turkmenistan, Iran, and the Asian Development Bank. The first railway link was inaugurated in May 2013 and the entire line in Turkmenistan was put into operation on 3 December 2014.

== History ==
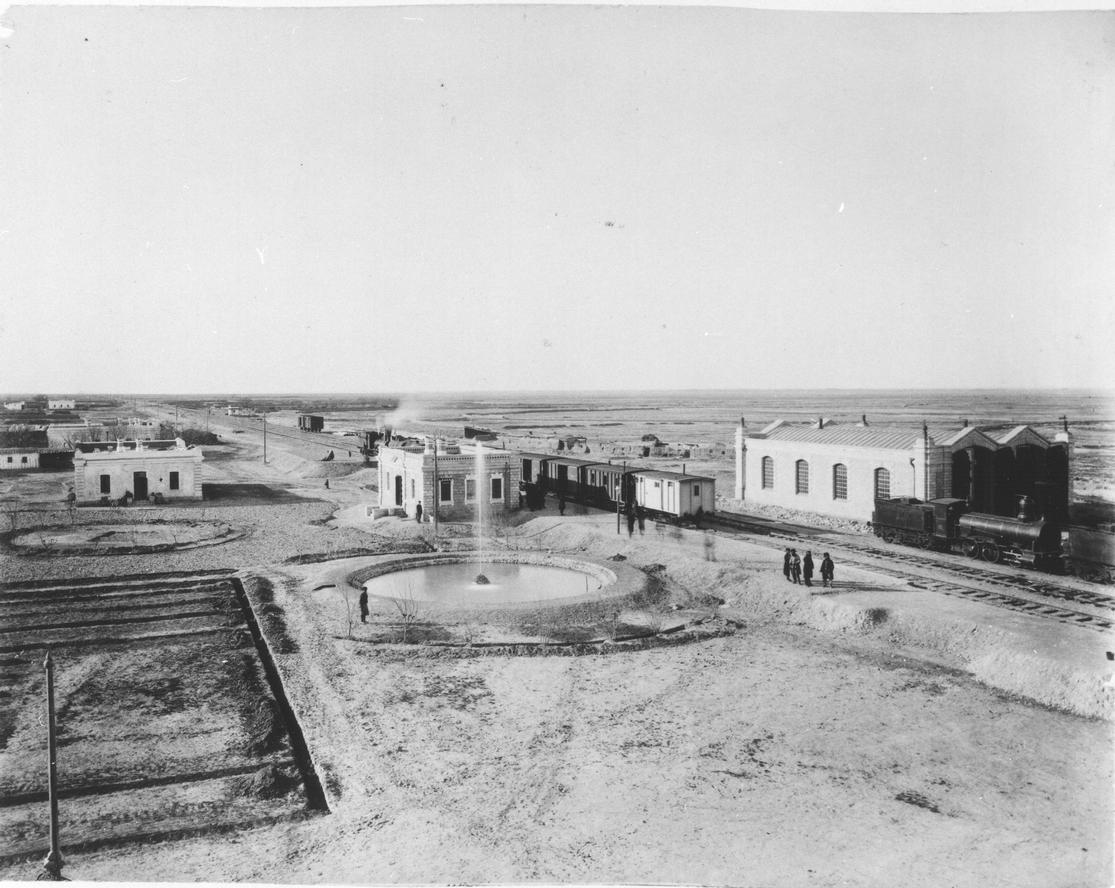
The station of Bamy on the Trans-Caspian Railway, circa 1890.

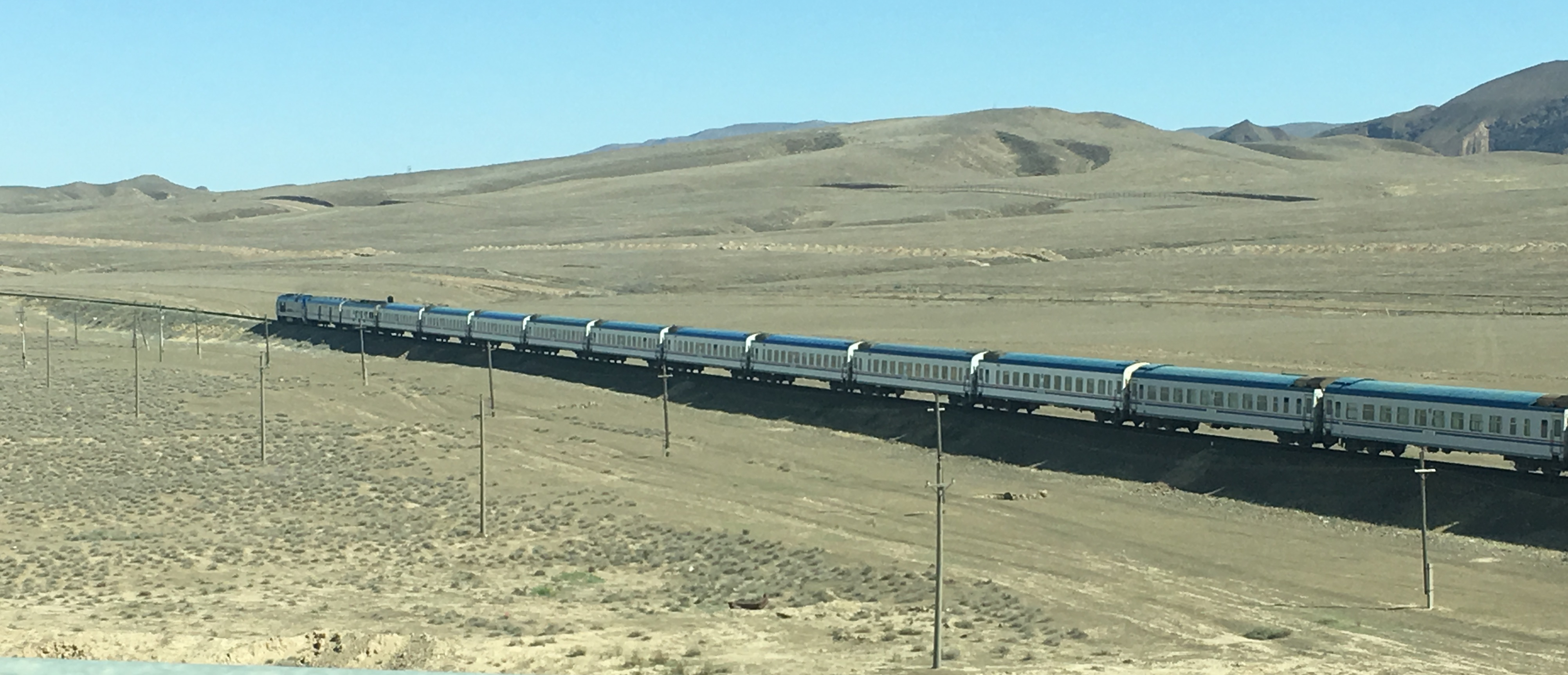
A passenger train in Turkmenistan in 2018

The first rail line in Turkmenistan was built in 1880, from the eastern shore of the Caspian Sea to Mollagara. By October 1881 the line was extended to Kyzyl-Arvat (today's Serdar), by 1886 had reached Chardzhou (today's Turkmenabat). In 1887 a wooden rail bridge was built over the Amu Darya, and the line was continued to Samarkand (1888) and Tashkent (1898). The rail line connecting Mary to Serhetabat was completed in 1898, and the train ferry between Kislovodsk (Türkmenbaşy and Baku began operating in 1905.

Rail service in Turkmenistan began as part of Imperial Russia's Trans-Caspian Railway, then of the Central Asian Railway. After the collapse of the USSR, the railway network in Turkmenistan was transferred to and operated by state-owned Türkmendemirýollary.

=== Tejen-Sarahs Rail Line ===
A rail line connecting the Trans-Caspian Railway to Iran via junctions at Parahat and Sarahs was constructed between 1992 and 1996. New stations were constructed at Parahat, Oguzhan, and Sarahs.

=== Türkmenabat-Kerki Rail Line ===
A rail line connecting the junctions at Türkmenabat and Kerki was put into operation in September 1999.

=== Trans-Karakum Railway ===
The Trans-Karakum Railway connecting Ashgabat and Daşoguz was completed in February 2006.

=== North-South Transnational Corridor ===
The rail line connecting Kazakhstan and Iran via Bereket was completed on 3 December 2014.

=== Rail lines to Afghanistan ===
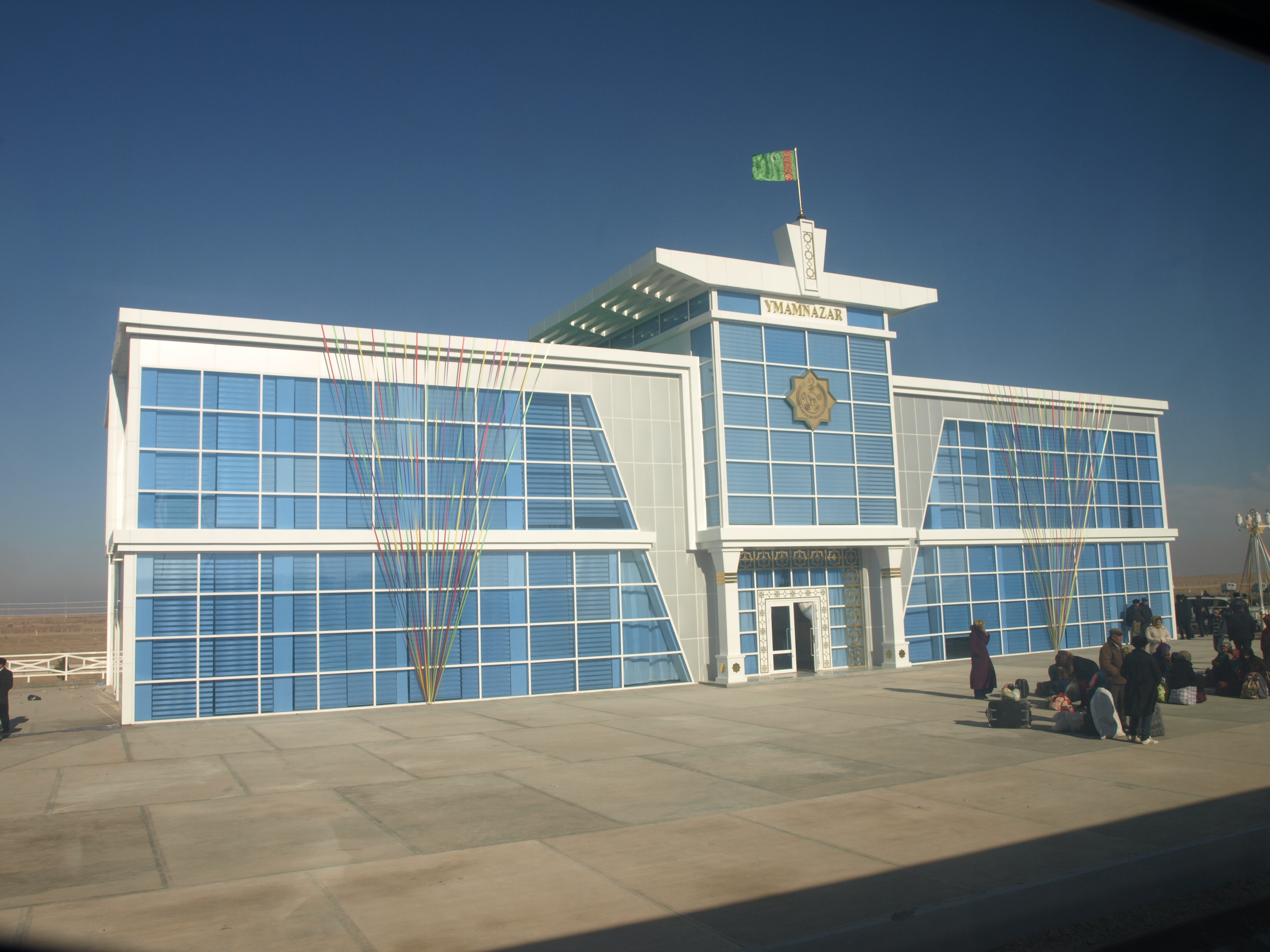
The passenger rail station at Ymamnazar, Turkmenistan, on the border with Afghanistan.

In 2013, work began on a link from Kerki via Ymamnazar on the Turkmen-Afghan border to Aqina in Andkhoy District. This link was opened in November 2016. It was extended 38 km to Andkhoy in January 2021, and is intended eventually to become part of a railway corridor through northern Afghanistan, linking it via Sherkhan Bandar, Mazar-i-Sharif and Kunduz to Tajikistan.

In 1960, the USSR built a railway across the Afghan border to Torghundi, although services were very limited. In February 2018, the existing rail line between Serhetabat and Torghundi in Afghanistan was renovated and restored to service. This line is planned to be extended to Herat, where it could potentially connect to a rail line under construction from Khaf, Iran.

== Rolling stock ==
The Asian Development Bank reported in 2021,

In 2019, TRA had a rolling stock fleet of 119 diesel locomotives, 10,056 freight wagons, and 425 passenger cars. The majority of locomotives and all the passenger cars were purchased from the PRC (25 CKD9A-series passenger locomotives and 83 CKD9C-series freight locomotives). The freight wagon fleet included 2,849 tanker wagons, 1,738 gondola wagons, 1,637 platform wagons, 1,358 closed hopper wagons, 1,143 box wagons and 654 refrigerated wagons.... In 2019, 6,607 wagons (65% of the fleet) [were] at least 30 years old, with many of these wagons having exceeded their normal economic life and in need of replacement.

In 2013, 154 passenger coaches were ordered from CSR; CSR had previously supplied locomotives.

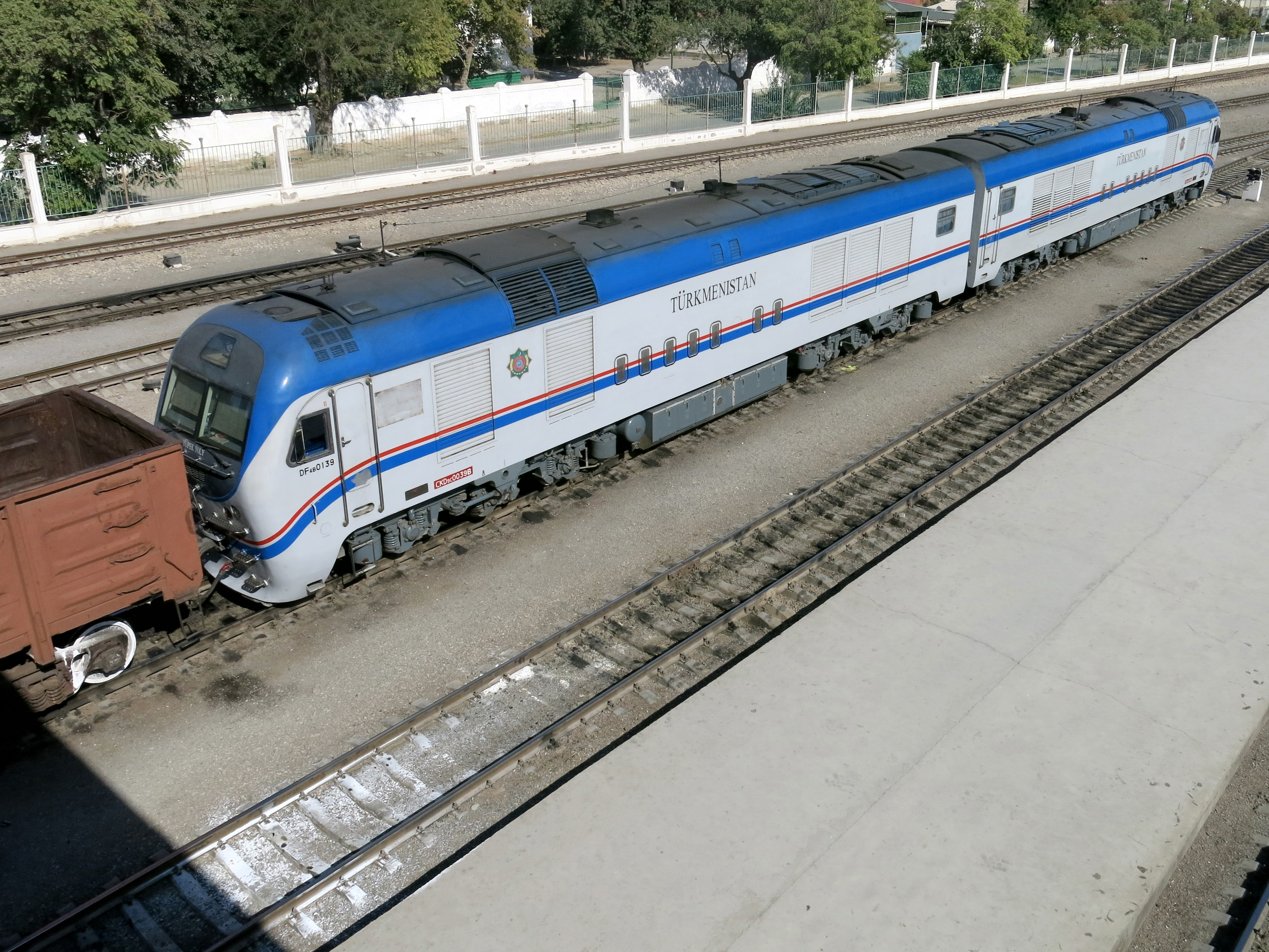
CKD9A

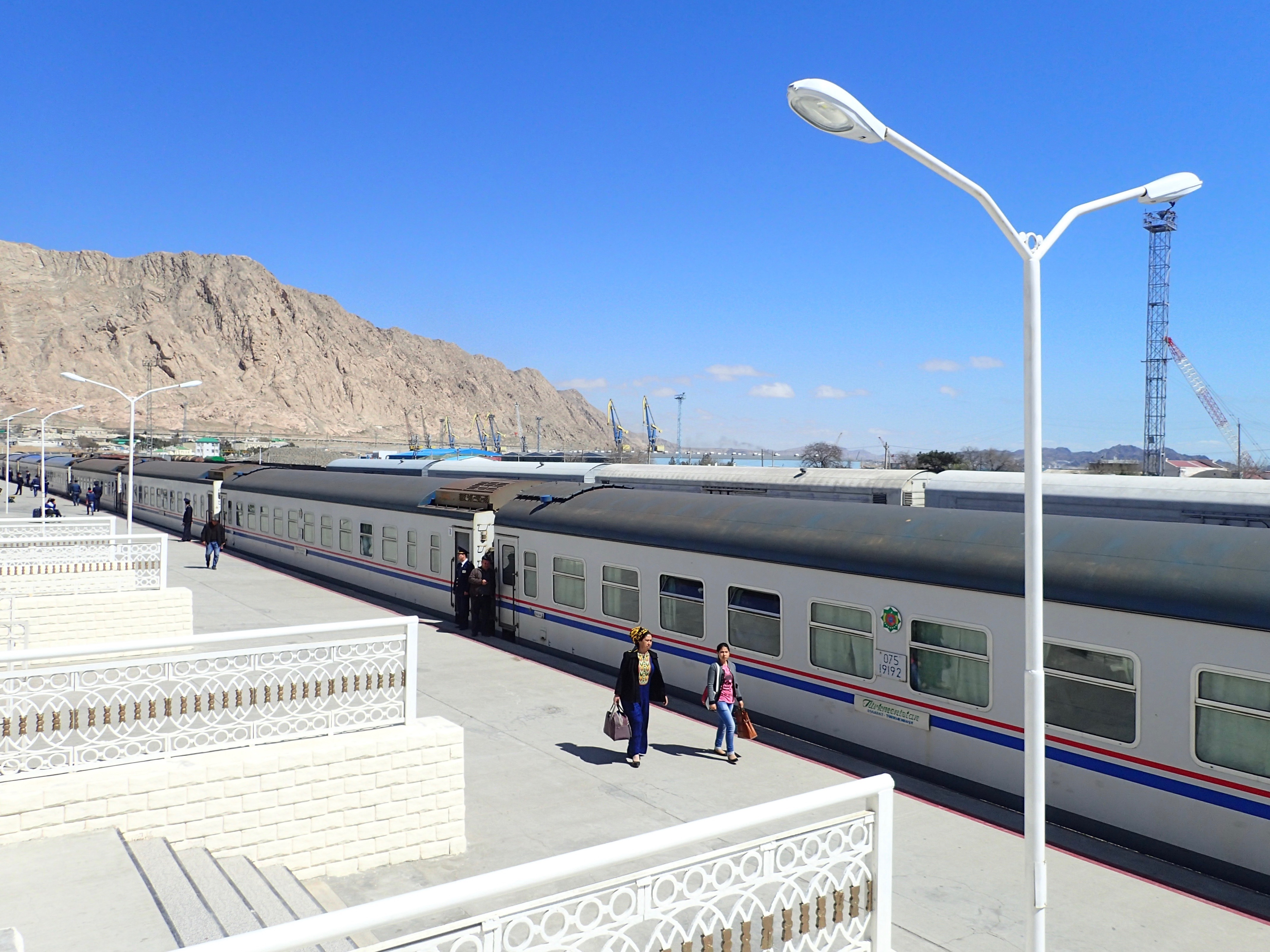
Ashgabat-Turkmenbashi train

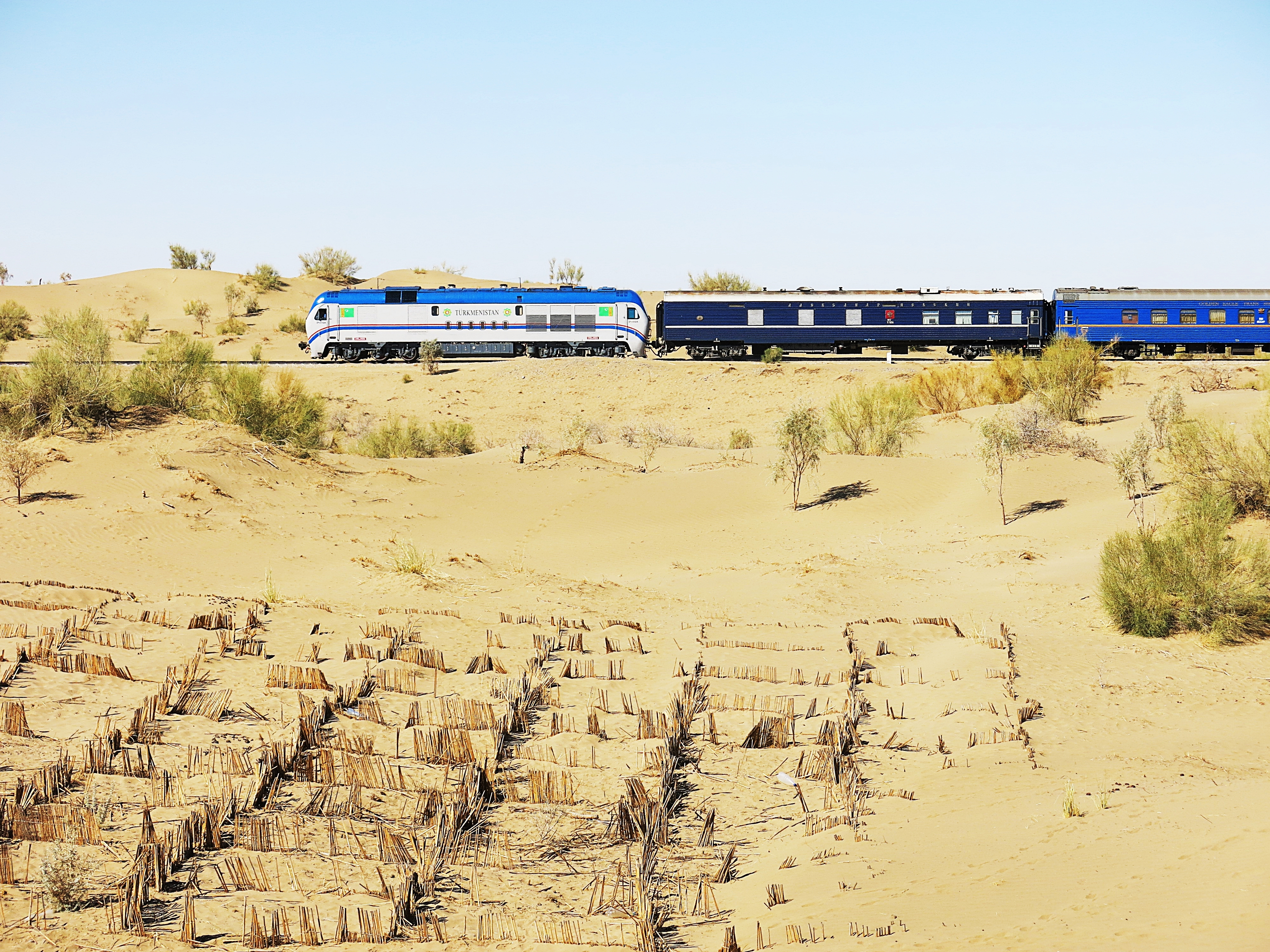

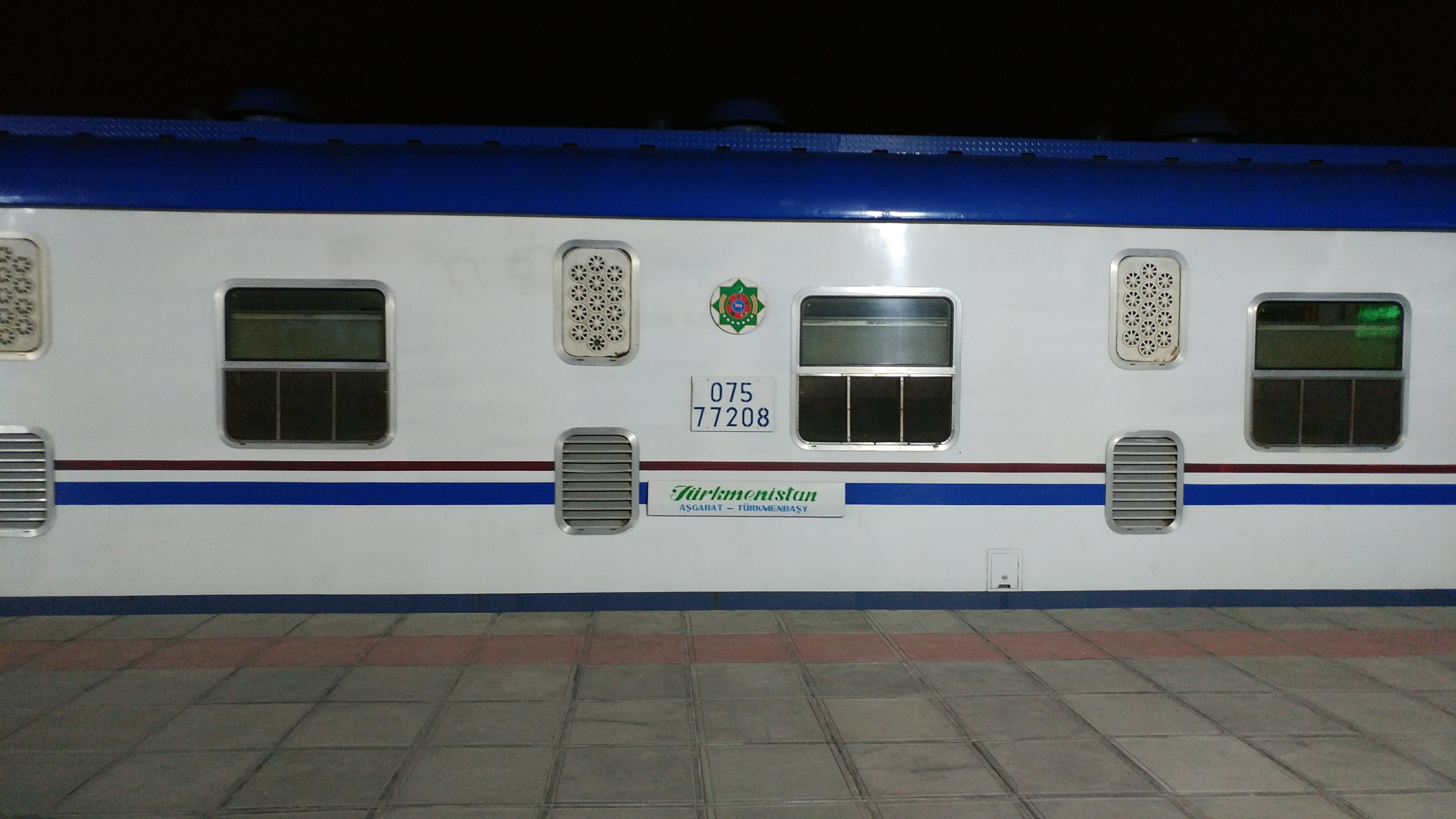

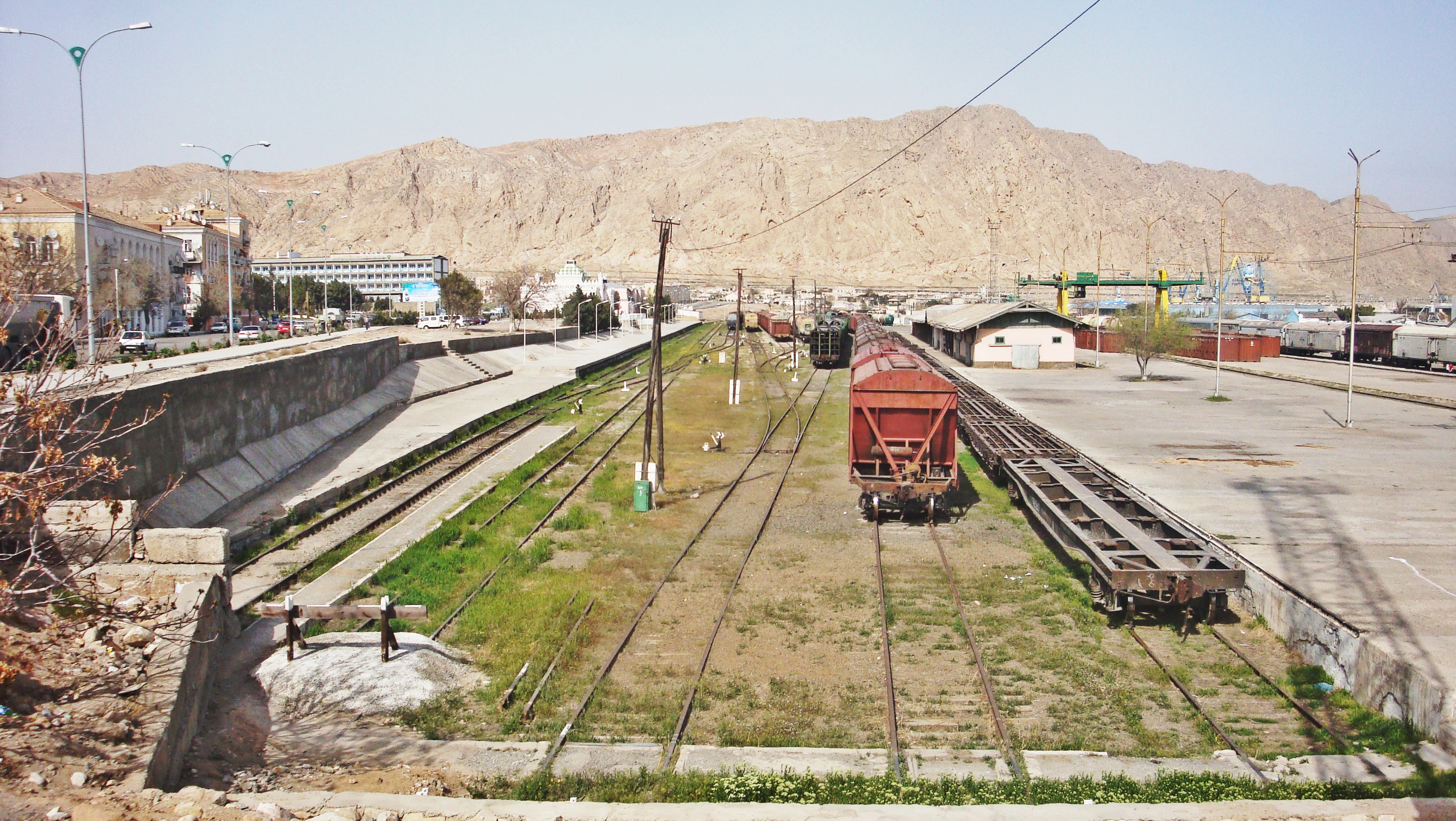

== High-speed railway project ==
In Turkmenistan, starting from 2023, a project was actively discussed by Turkmen and Russian officials to build a sub-high-speed railway (at a speed of 140 km/h) line from the city of Arkadag to Ashgabat and Avaza.

== See also ==
- List of railway stations in Turkmenistan
- North-South Transnational Railway Corridor
- Railways Agency of Turkmenistan
- Trans-Caspian Railway
- Trans-Karakum Railway
- Transport in Turkmenistan
- Türkmendemirýollary
