= Tasbolat Mukhametkaliev =

Kazakh scientist, academic, and author (1937–2019)

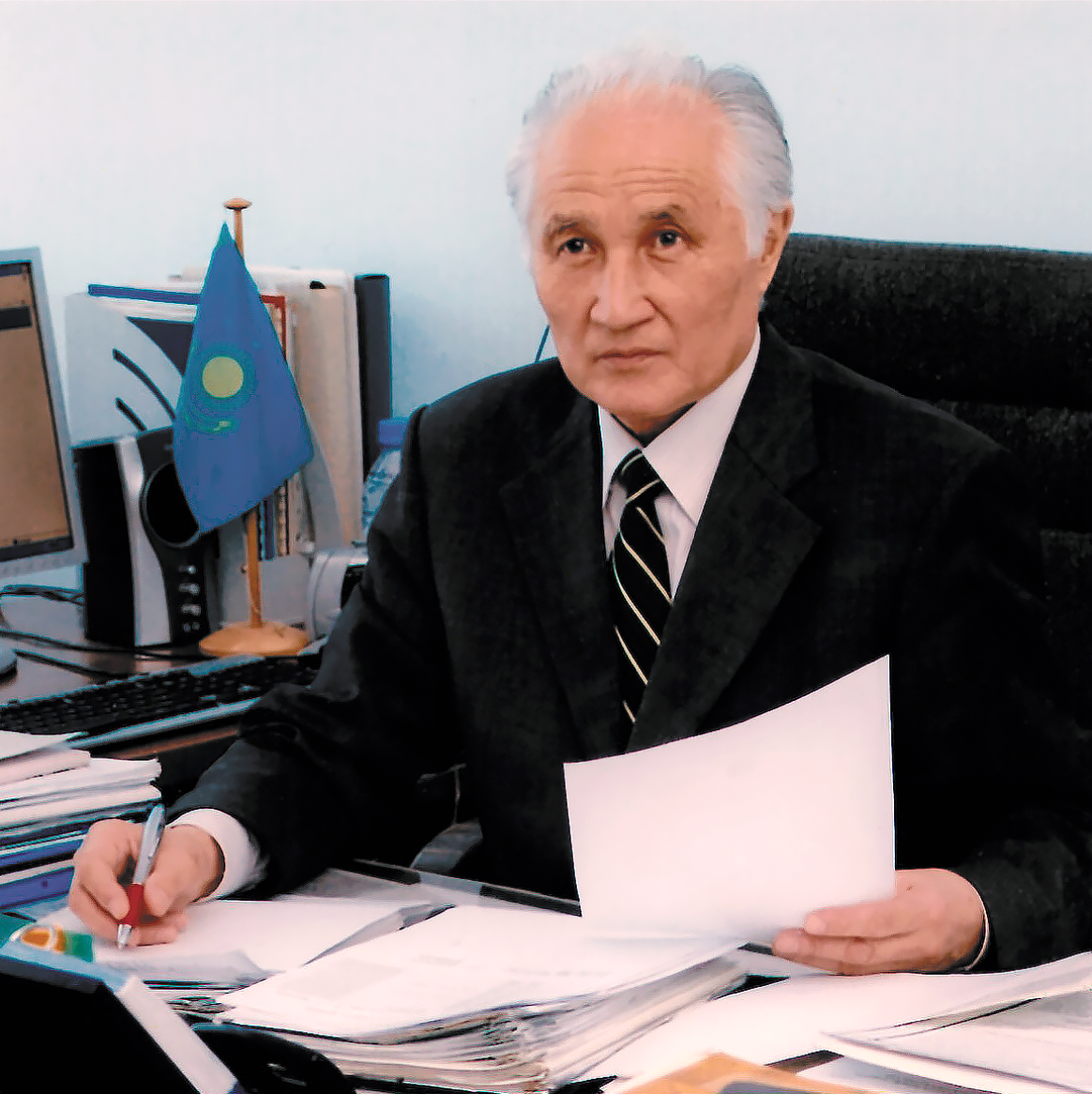
- Tasbolat Mukhametkaliev in his office in the 2000s
- Born: December 29, 1937; Kirovskoye district center of the Taldy-Kurgan region of the Kazakh SSR
- Died: November 26, 2019 (aged 81); Almaty, Kazakhstan
- Occupations: Scientist; teacher; author; organizer of national higher education

Tasbolat Mardenovich Mukhametkaliev (December 29, 1937, Kirovskoye District Center Kazakh SSR – November 26, 2019, Almaty, Kazakhstan) was a Kazakh scientist, teacher, author, and organizer of national higher education. He was also a Professor and Doctor of Chemistry.

== Biography ==
Tasbolat Mukhametkaliev's father was Marden Mukhametkaliev (1902–1980), the chief accountant of the Inter-village Machine and Tractor Station in the village of "Mukry". In 1949, he was appointed manager of the District Branch of the Agricultural Bank of the Kazakh SSR.

His mother was Shamkhiya (1911–1959), the daughter of a prosperous Kazakh, and she worked on a village farm.

Shamkhiya and Marden came from the Argyn clan Kanzhigaly. Together they had four children: Kayriya (1928), Tasbolat (1937), Bekbolat (1941) and Zhanbolat (1944).

In 1949, Tasbolat graduated from a Kazakh elementary school, and in 1956 a Russian-language high school. He then started a chemistry program at the S. Kirov Kazakh State University, graduating in 1961 with a degree in Organic Chemistry. In 1967 Tasbolat defended his PhD, and in 1991 his doctoral dissertation at the Institute of Chemical Sciences at the Academy of Sciences of the Kazakh SSR. In 1993, Tasbolat received the title of Professor of Chemistry.

== Career ==
On December 1, 1964 Tasbolat began working as a Research Assistant in the department of Organic Chemistry and Chemistry of Natural Compounds of S. Kirov Kazakh State University. In 1968, he was elected as a Senior Lecturer, and in 1970 he became Assistant Professor in the Department of Organic Chemistry and Natural Compounds. From 1972 to 1987, Tasbolat worked as a Chancellor of the Dzhambul Technological Institute of Light and Food Industry.

From 1988 to 1990, Tasbolat was the Head of the Republican Government Inspection of Educational Institutions under the Ministry of Public Education of the Kazakh SSR. In 1995, he became Deputy Chief Scientific Secretary of the National Academy of Sciences of the Republic of Kazakhstan, Head of the Department of Planning, Expertise, and Support of Scientific Programs of the Academy of Sciences, and Head of the Department of Scientific Institutions and Scientific Personnel of the Ministry of Science and Education. From 2000 to 2009, Tasbolat worked as Vice-Chancellor for educational and methodological work, and as First Vice-Chancellor and Adviser to the Chancellor of the Almaty Technological University, before retiring in 2019.

Tasbolat authored more than 125 scientific and methodological works, manuals, and 12 copyright certificates for inventions. Under his scientific supervision, 1 PhD and 6 PhD candidates were prepared.

== Recognition ==
Tasbolat was awarded by the Ministry of Education and Science of the Republic of Kazakhstan with the badges of "Excellence in Education of the Republic of Kazakhstan" and "Honorary Worker of Education of the Republic of Kazakhstan."

On October 9, 2018, in honor of its 60-year anniversary, Dulaty University in Taraz, Kazakhstan, named its Physicochemical Research Center in Mukhametkaliev Tasbolat Mardenovich's name.

For the last decade of his life, Tasbolat became a contributing author for the periodic scientific journal Современное Образование ("Modern Education"), for which he wrote articles discussing and analyzing the system of education in Kazakhstan.

On June 12, 1965, Tasbolat married Sarah Rakhmetova. They had a son, Maksat, and a daughter, Raushan.
