= Demirýollary =

State-owned railway company in Turkmenistan

- logo_alt=Turkmenistan railway company logo
- Native name: «Demirýollary» açyk görnüşli paýdarlar jemgyýeti
- Type: Government owned
- Industry: Rail transport
- Predecessor: Türkmendemirýollary agentligi
- Founded: 5 February 2020
- Headquarters: Ashgabat, Turkmenistan
- Area served: Turkmenistan
- Services: Rail transport, Cargo
- Operating income: 1.626 billion manats (2018)
- Net income: 280 million manats (2018)
- Owner: Government of Turkmenistan
- Number of employees: ~15,000 (2020)
- Website: www.railway.gov.tm

Demirýollary open joint-stock company (Turkmen: «Demirýollary» açyk görnüşli paýdarlar jemgyýeti, means Railways) is the state-owned operator of railways in Turkmenistan. The company operates on 4,980 km (3,090 mi) of railways (37th in the world) and maintains over 345 railway stations throughout the country. The company belongs to the Ministry of Industry and Construction and is subordinate to the Railways Agency of Turkmenistan. It is headquartered in Ashgabat. While the rail system itself belongs to the railways agency, the Turkmen Railways company owns the locomotive and railcar depots, rail stations, construction and maintenance units, communications and power supply services, and two hotels in Awaza, the Kerwen and Türkmenbaşy.

== History ==
=== Independent Turkmenistan ===
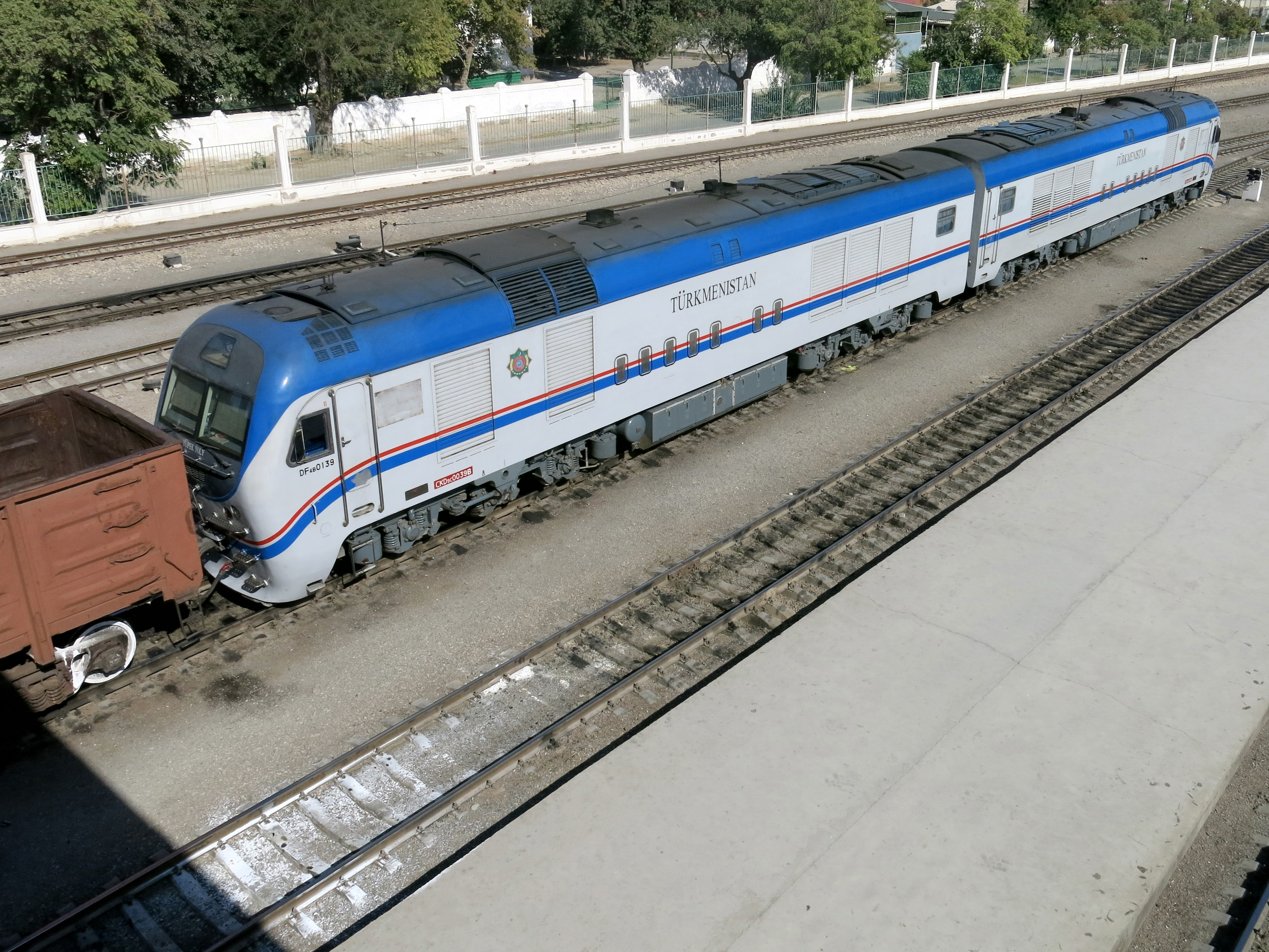

On 29 January 2019 the Ministry of Railways was downgraded to agency status, renamed the Turkmen Railways Agency (Turkmen: Türkmendemirýollary agentligi), and subordinated to the reorganized Ministry of Industry and Communications (which subsequently was again reorganized into the Ministry of Industry and Construction).

=== Demirýollary OJSC (from 2020) ===
The open joint-stock company Demirýollary was formed as a commercial subsidiary of the Turkmen Railways Agency on 5 February 2020. Demirýollary has received the functions of a carrier in both freight and passenger traffic. President of Turkmenistan Gurbanguly Berdimuhamedov signed a decree on the transfer of functions of a railway carrier to the new structure. The founders of the new OJSC Demiryollary are the Agency Turkmendemiryollary, the Ashgabat Distance of Tracks and Structures, OJSC Türkmenistanyň Ulag-logistika merkezi and the mobile operator Altyn Asyr.

In order to prevent infectious diseases, the movement of passenger trains in Turkmenistan was suspended on July 16, 2020. In the spring of 2021, passenger traffic was fully restored. Passengers must have a COVID-19 negative test certificate issued no earlier than 72 hours before travel. Before boarding the train, passengers will have their temperature measured, oxolinic ointment will be applied to the nasal mucosa, and their hands will be treated with a disinfecting solution. The guides and representatives of the traffic police are obliged to monitor the observance of a distance of at least one meter, which must be adhered to by passengers, as well as the wearing of masks. Coupe tickets will only be available for 2 seats instead of 4. Conductors are obliged to disinfect the cars 6 hours before the train departs, after arriving at the destination and every 3-4 hours during the movement of trains.

== Activities ==
The main activities of Demirýollary involve freight and passenger traffic. The company annually serves almost 6 million passengers. The passenger department employs 5,000 specialists out of a total staff profile of about 15,000.

Sale of railway passenger tickets is carried out also via the Internet and a mobile application for Android and iOS. The online ticketing service in Turkmenistan was launched on June 1, 2019.

== Rolling stock ==
The Asian Development Bank reported in 2021,

In 2019, [Turkmen Railway Agency] had a rolling stock fleet of 119 diesel locomotives, 10,056 freight wagons, and 425 passenger cars. The majority of locomotives and all the passenger cars were purchased from the PRC (25 CKD9A-series passenger locomotives and 83 CKD9C-series freight locomotives). The freight wagon fleet included 2,849 tanker wagons, 1,738 gondola wagons, 1,637 platform wagons, 1,358 closed hopper wagons, 1,143 box wagons and 654 refrigerated wagons.... In 2019, 6,607 wagons (65% of the fleet) [were] at least 30 years old, with many of these wagons having exceeded their normal economic life and in need of replacement.

In 2013, 154 passenger coaches were ordered from CSR; CSR had previously supplied locomotives.

=== Diesel Locomotives ===
The locomotive park consists of diesel locomotives of the 2TE10L, 2TE10U, 2M62U series, there are also several Chinese-made CKD9A, Kazakh/American-made TE33A, Russian-made 2TE25KM and TEP70BS locomotives. Shunting work is performed by diesel locomotives TEM2, TEM2U, ChME3.

Since 2004, CRRC Ziyang has delivered 294 locomotives to Turkmenistan, which, as of August 2025, handle more than 98% of the country's railway transportation.

In July 2025, these diesel locomotives underwent major overhauls at CRRC Ziyang in China. The project involved comprehensive refurbishment of key components, including bogies, diesel engines, and electrical systems. It also included the integration of next-generation intelligent control systems, safety monitoring technologies, and ergonomic improvements.

=== Passenger trains ===
The passenger coupe consists of a four-person (two-story) sleeping compartment with doors opening into the corridor. The Couchette car features six seats (three-story), without doors. The Sleeping cars offer two sleeping places for two passengers with doors.

=== Photos ===
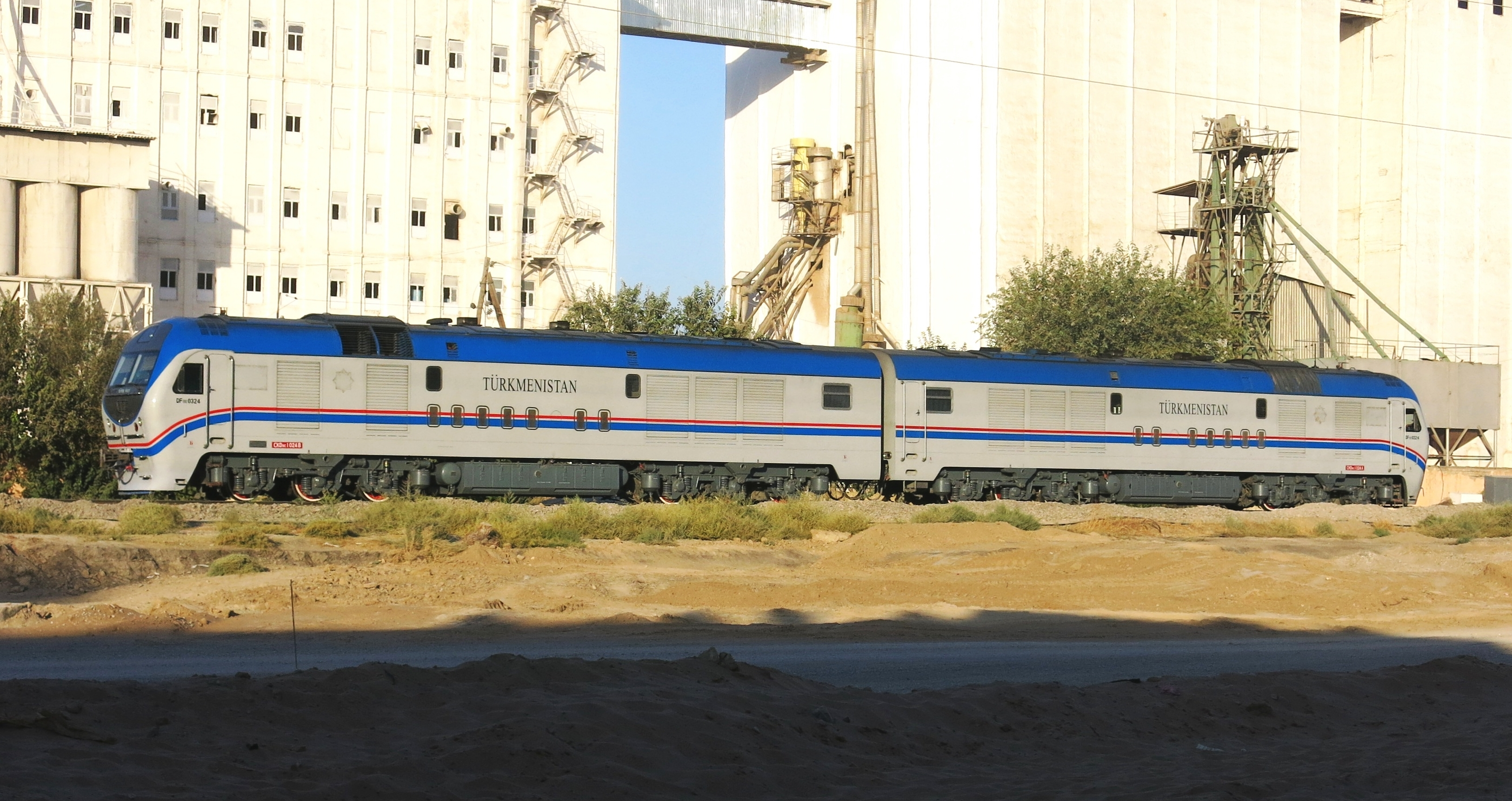

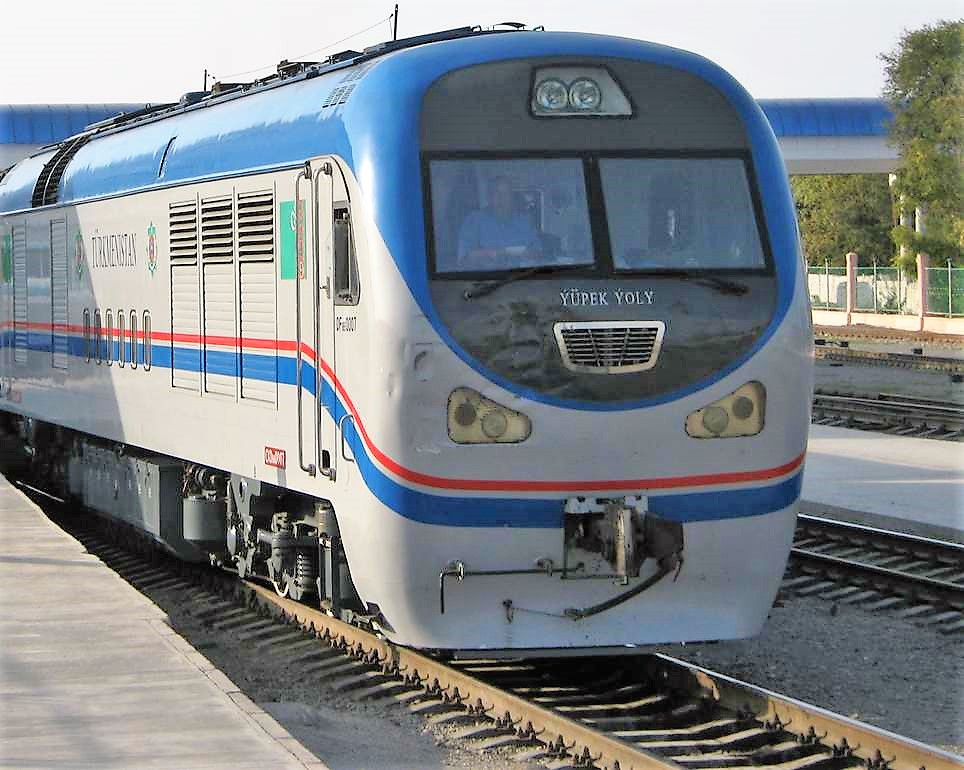
Lokomotive at Ashgabat railway station

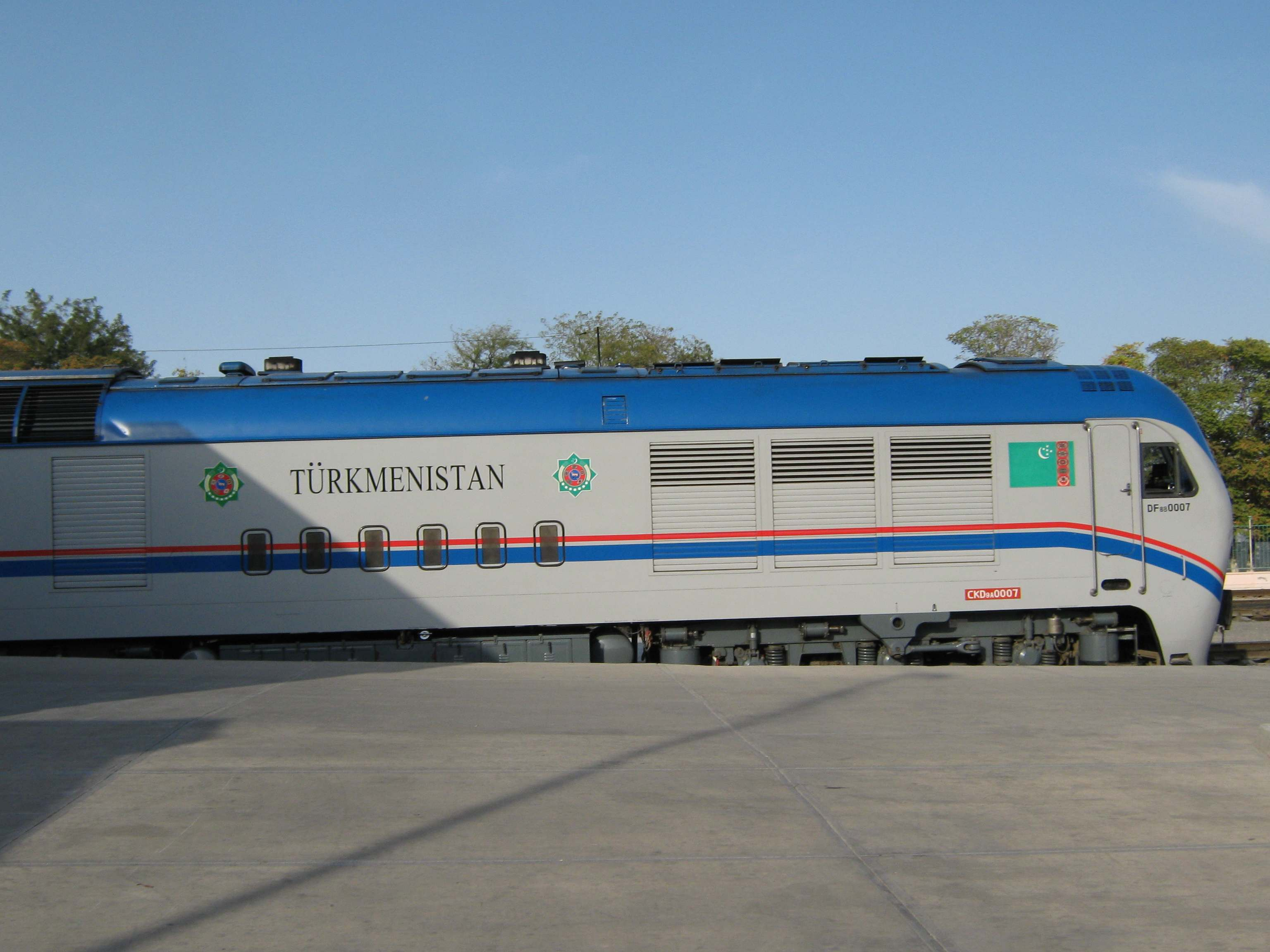

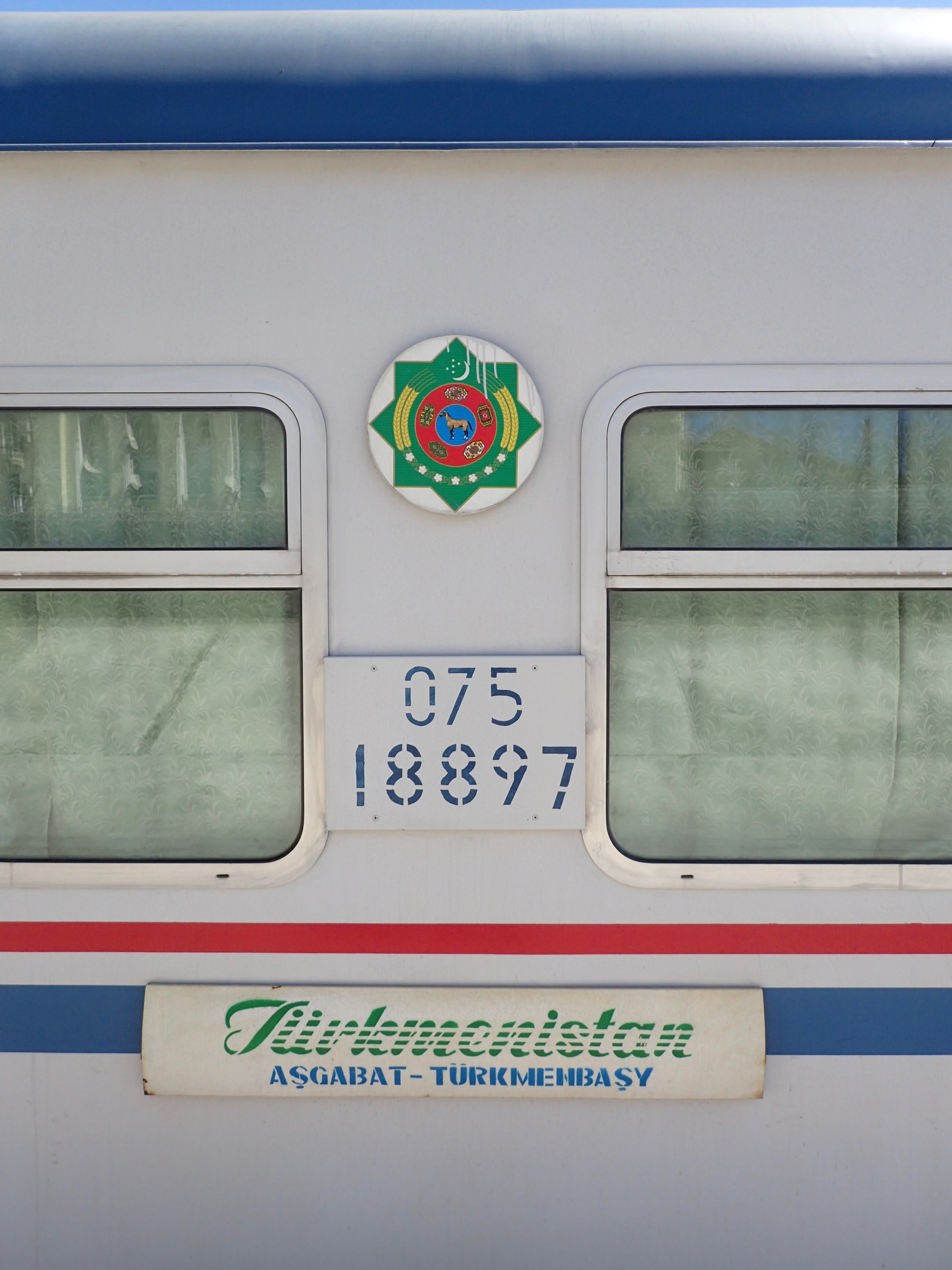

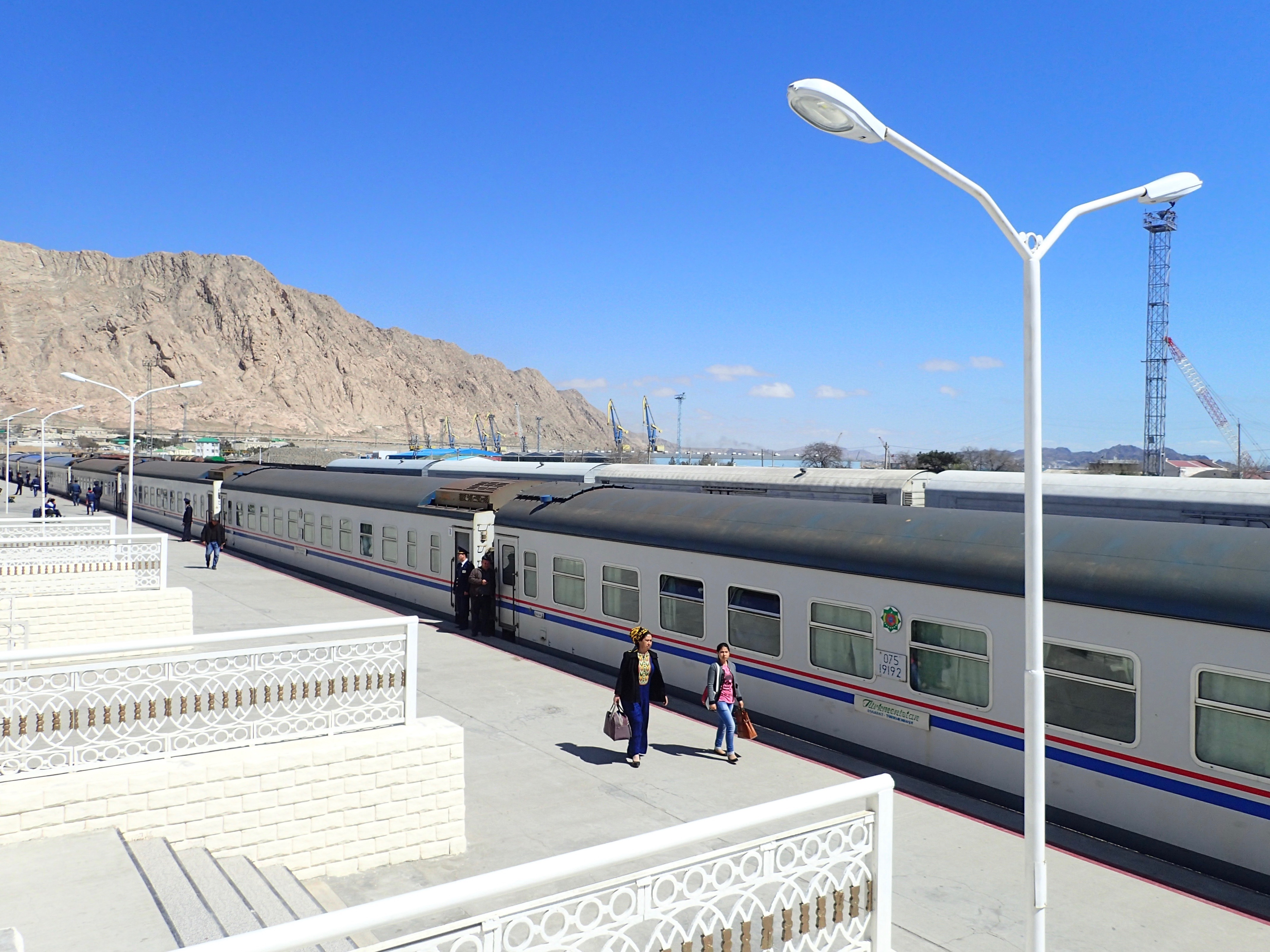

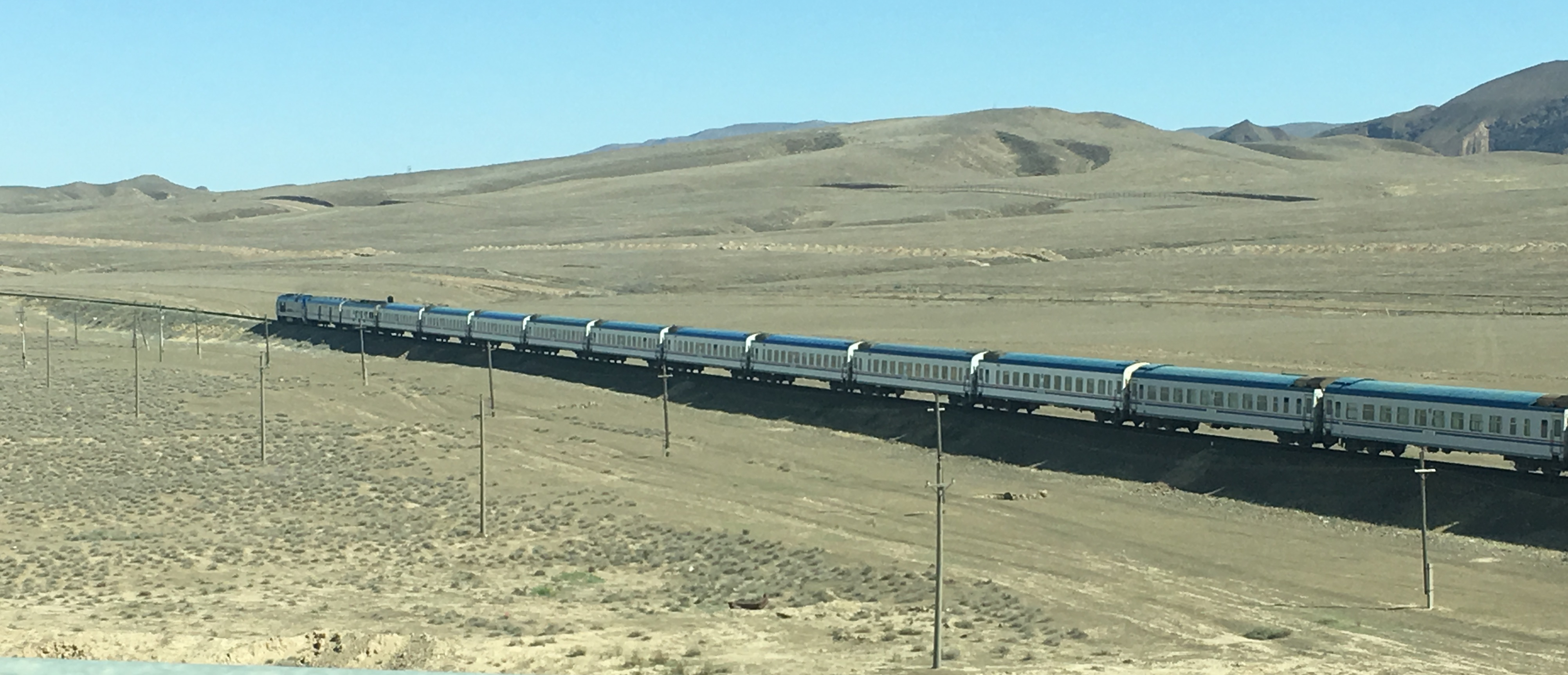
A passenger train on the Trans-Caspian Railway line east of Ashgabat, Turkmenistan

== Railway links with adjacent countries ==
- Kazakhstan – same gauge (former Soviet Union railway system) – new rail link opened in 2013.
- Iran-open-break-of-gauge.1,520 mm (4 ft 11 27/32 in).

== Headquarters ==
Türkmenistan, Aşgabat ş., Türkmenbaşy şaýoly, jaý 7

== See also ==
- Railways Agency of Turkmenistan
- Rail transport in Turkmenistan
- Transport in Turkmenistan
- Trans-Karakum Railway
- Trans-Caspian railway
- North-South Transnational Railway Corridor
