= Amyderýa =

Amyderýa Amyderýa şäherçesi
- Town
- Location in Turkmenistan
- Coordinates: 37.89364962593497°N 65.24310095037129°E
- Country: Turkmenistan
- Province: Lebap Province
- District: Döwletli District
- Elevation: 244 m (801 ft)

Population (2022 official census)
  - Total: 10,330
- Time zone: UTC+5

Amyderýa, formerly known as Samsonovo (in Russian: Самсоново), is a town in Döwletli District, Lebap Province, Turkmenistan. It is located on the right bank of the river of the same name, just next to Kerkiçi, facing Kerki on the opposite bank. In 2022, it had a population of 10,330.

== Etymology ==
Amyderýa is the spelling in Turkmen referring to the Amu Darya River, which flows 1 km away.

The town was known as Samsonovo ("Самсоново") until 1962; the name refers to Alexander Samsonov, a Russian General.

== Notable people ==
- Rejep Bazarow (born 1958), Turkmen statesman and politician

== Transportation ==
Amyderýa is on a branch of the Trans-Caspian railway that leads from Samarqand in Uzbekistan, through the far east of Turkmenistan, and then back to Termez in Uzbekistan and finally Dushanbe in Tajikistan. Amyderýa is one of three major stations on this line in Turkmenistan, along with Köýtendag and Kelif.

The P-39 highway connects the city to Kerki across the Amu Darya River by the Kerki-Kerkiçi Bridge, built in cooperation with Ukrainian corporatives. The P-37 highway connects the town to the nearby municipalities of Kerkiçi and Dostluk, and farther east to Köýtendag and the border with Uzbekistan. The P-89 highway leads north to the Uzbek border town of Tallimarjon.

== See also ==
- List of municipalities in Lebap Province
- Towns of Turkmenistan
