= D19Er =

Vietnamese locomotive

- D19Er-2032
Type and origin
- Power type: Diesel
- Builder: CRRC Ziyang Locomotive Co., Ltd.
- Model: SDD3
- Build date: 2006
- Total produced: 5
Specifications
- Configuration
  - UIC: Co'Co'
- Gauge: 1435 mm (4 ft 8 1/2 in)
- Loco weight: 108 t
- Fuel type: Diesel
Performance figures
- Maximum speed: 120 km/h (75 mph)
Career
- Operators: Vietnam Railways
- Class: D19Er
- Locale: Vietnam

The D19Er locomotive or Hữu Nghị locomotive is a diesel locomotive and currently used on Vietnam Railways network. (almost in Northern Vietnam railway network).

== Design ==
These locomotives were built by CRRC Ziyang company in China in 2006. They build 5 locomotives only. The D19Er locomotive is almost use for Passenger train and freight train and now, there is a line connecting Vietnam with Europe by rail and Vietnam Railways use these locomotives.

== Information ==
- Manufacturer: CRRC Ziyang (China)
- Model: SDD3
- Built: 2006
- Gauge: 1,435 mm (4 ft 8 1/2 in) (Standard-gauge)
- Power Type: Diesel
- Loco weight: 108 t
- Maximum speed: 120 km/h (75 mph)
- UIC: Co'Co'

== Accident ==
in 2022, specifically on October 5, while running in the direction of Lạng Sơn - Hà Nội, the train pulled by the locomotive code D19Er-2035 of Vietnam Railways to the area of Na Phuoc village, Van Thuy commune, Chi Lăng district, derailed, dragging 2 freight cars behind it.

After the incident, the authorities organized a rescue, and by about 9:00 a.m. on October 6, the incident was resolved. The incident did not cause any damage to people or goods, and due to timely notification, it did not affect or disrupt train operations on this route. The cause of the incident is being investigated by the authorities.
