= Mukry =

Mukry Mukry şäherçesi
- Town
- Location in Turkmenistan
- Coordinates: 37°35′50″N 65°44′13″E
- Country: Turkmenistan
- Province: Lebap Province
- District: Köýtendag District

Population (2022 official census)
  - Total: 7,013
- Time zone: UTC+5

Mukry, previously known as Akgumdänajy, is a town in Köýtendag District, Lebap Province, Turkmenistan. It is located on the right bank of the Amu Darya River, circa 25 km west of Köýtendag, and 5 km north of the border with Afghanistan. In 2022, it had a population of 7,013 people.

== Etymology ==
Mukry is the name of a Turkmen tribe. The town was named Akgumdänajy (Cyrillic: Акгумдәнаҗы) at some point but the name Mukry was restored after construction of the railway station.

== Economy ==
Mukry is the location of a gypsum mine.

== Transportation ==
Mukry features a station on the rail line connecting Kerki to the Kelif border crossing into Uzbekistan, and is on the P-37 highway. A rail spur and a road connect it to the city of Magdanly.

== See also ==
- List of municipalities in Lebap Province
- Towns of Turkmenistan
