= Kerkiçi =

Kerkiçi Kerkiçi şäherçesi
- Town
- Location in Turkmenistan
- Coordinates: 37°51′06″N 65°14′20″E
- Country: Turkmenistan
- Province: Lebap Province
- District: Döwletli District

Population (2022 official census)
  - Total: 14,996
- Time zone: UTC+5

Kerkiçi is a town located in Lebap Province, Turkmenistan. In 2022, the town had a population of 14,996 people.

== Etymology ==
In Turkmen, the word "Kerki" refers to a "pick" or a "mattock." The suffix "-çi" refers to a profession. Thus, Kerkiçi could be translated as "Miner," "Digger," or "the one who digs/mines."

The city of Kerki, on the other bank of the Amu-Darya, might share the same etymology.

== History ==
In September 6, 2009, a bridge between Kerki and Kerkiçi, which was built by Ukrainian corporatives, is dedicated by president Gurbanguly Berdimuhamedow of Turkmenistan and president Viktor Yushchenko of Ukraine. It opens on February 14, 2013.
