= Garnås =

Garnås is a surname. Notable people with the surname include:

- Agnes Buen Garnås (1946–2024), Norwegian folk singer
- Espen Garnås (born 1994), Norwegian football player
