= Köýtendag =

Köýtendag Köýtendag şäheri
- City
- Location in Turkmenistan
- Coordinates: 37.517366°N 66.014160°E
- Country: Turkmenistan
- Province: Lebap Province
- District: Köýtendag District

Population (2022 official census)
  - Total: 18,816
- Time zone: UTC+5

Köýtendag, formerly known as Çarşaňňy, is a city and the administrative center of Köýtendag District in Lebap Province, Turkmenistan. The city lies in the far-eastern part of Turkmenistan, less than 10 km north of Afghanistan. In 2022, it had a population of 18,816 people.

== Etymology ==
The name is a compound of Köýten plus the Turkmen word dag ("mountain"). Köýten is in turn a Turkified version of the Persian compound Kuhi tang, kuhi - "mountain" and tang - "narrow". The name previously applied to the valley as well as the mountains. According to Atanyýazow, Çarşaňňy is the name of a Turkmen tribe.

== Location ==
Köýtendag is located in the eastern end of Lebap Province and, consequently, all of Turkmenistan. It lies at an altitude of 265 meters on the right bank of the Amu-Darya River, which forms the border with Jowzjan Province, Afghanistan. The Afghan town of Qarqin is on the opposite side of the river. The plains surrounding the river are quite flat. Near the river the land is quite fertile and arable, supporting some farming, but further from the river the land is arid. To the northeast the Köýtendag Range rises dramatically, including Turkmenistan's highest mountain, Aýrybaba, at a height of 3,138 metres (10,295 ft).

== History ==
On 29 December 1999, by Parliamentary Resolution No. HM-61, the city and district of Çarşaňňy were renamed Köýtendag. On 27 July 2016, by Parliamentary Resolution No. 425-V the town of Köýtendag was upgraded in status to "city in a district".

== Climate ==
Köýtendag has a hot desert climate (Köppen climate classification BWh), with cool winters and very hot summers. Rainfall is generally light and erratic, and occurs mainly in the winter and autumn months.

Climate data for Köýtendag
Month	Jan	Feb	Mar	Apr	May	Jun	Jul	Aug	Sep	Oct	Nov	Dec	Year
Record high °C (°F)	26.0 (78.8)	29.4 (84.9)	34.8 (94.6)	39.6 (103.3)	43.5 (110.3)	49.0 (120.2)	48.0 (118.4)	49.0 (120.2)	41.6 (106.9)	36.7 (98.1)	34.1 (93.4)	27.0 (80.6)	49.0 (120.2)
Mean daily maximum °C (°F)	10.2 (50.4)	12.7 (54.9)	18.7 (65.7)	26.2 (79.2)	32.1 (89.8)	38.0 (100.4)	39.5 (103.1)	37.8 (100.0)	32.6 (90.7)	25.6 (78.1)	18.1 (64.6)	12.3 (54.1)	25.3 (77.6)
Daily mean °C (°F)	5.2 (41.4)	7.6 (45.7)	13.1 (55.6)	20.1 (68.2)	25.5 (77.9)	30.7 (87.3)	32.1 (89.8)	29.7 (85.5)	24.2 (75.6)	17.7 (63.9)	11.5 (52.7)	7.0 (44.6)	18.7 (65.7)
Mean daily minimum °C (°F)	0.7 (33.3)	2.5 (36.5)	7.6 (45.7)	13.7 (56.7)	18.2 (64.8)	22.4 (72.3)	23.7 (74.7)	21.0 (69.8)	15.5 (59.9)	9.9 (49.8)	5.3 (41.5)	2.3 (36.1)	11.9 (53.4)
Record low °C (°F)	−20.6 (−5.1)	−14.0 (6.8)	−5.4 (22.3)	0.2 (32.4)	4.4 (39.9)	8.0 (46.4)	7.7 (45.9)	10.0 (50.0)	4.0 (39.2)	−5.1 (22.8)	−8.0 (17.6)	−15.7 (3.7)	−20.6 (−5.1)
Average precipitation mm (inches)	15.4 (0.61)	9.2 (0.36)	22.9 (0.90)	15.3 (0.60)	12.3 (0.48)	0.4 (0.02)	3.2 (0.13)	1.5 (0.06)	6.6 (0.26)	6.9 (0.27)	6.8 (0.27)	21.8 (0.86)	122.3 (4.82)
Average precipitation days (≥ 0.1 mm)	7.8	8.9	6.0	3.8	1.8	0.4	0.0	0.0	0.3	1.6	5.1	6.8	42.5
Average relative humidity (%)	69.9	63.0	51.6	45.6	35.0	25.6	24.8	27.0	32.1	41.5	58.9	70.0	45.4
Source: climatebase.ru

== Transportation ==
Köýtendag is on a branch of the Trans-Caspian railway that leads from Samarqand in Uzbekistan, through the far east of Turkmenistan, and then back to Termez in Uzbekistan and finally Dushanbe in Tajikistan. Köýtendag is one of three stations on this line in Turkmenistan, along with Amydarya and Mukry. That rail line is connected to the Turkmen rail network at the Kerki junction.

The P-37 highway connects the city to Kerki to the west and the border with Uzbekistan in the east.
