= Magdanly =

Magdanly Magdanly şäheri
- City
- Location within Turkmenistan
- Coordinates: 37°48′24″N 66°03′24″E
- Country: Turkmenistan
- Province: Lebap Province
- District: Köýtendag District

Population (2022 official census)
  - Total: 44,508
- Time zone: UTC+5

Magdanly, formerly known as Gowurdak or Gaurdak (in Russian: Говурдак), is a city in Köýtendag District, Lebap Province, Turkmenistan. In 2022, it had a population of 44,508 people.

== Etymology ==
The word magdan means "ore" in Turkmen, and the suffix -ly means "with", hence "with ore". The area, in the foothills of the Köýtendag Mountains, is rich in various mineral ores. The former name, Gowurdak, referred to a mountain in that district which is mined for high-quality sulfur. Atanyyazow explains that the name Gowurdak "is derived from the local dialect gövür ('sulfur') and the word dag, yielding 'sulfur mountain'."

== History ==
The name of the city was changed from Gowurdak to Magdanly on 8 September, 2002.

On 25 November 2017, Magdanly was downgraded from a city with "district status" to a city "in a district", subordinate to Köýtendag District.

=== Administrative Divisions ===
Prior to losing its status as "City with district status", the city of Magdanly also had two rural councils under its jurisdiction:

- Çärjew, including the village of the same name
- Ýürekdepe, including the village of the same name and the village of Aýrybaba

Both of these village councils were incorporated in Köýtendag District. Later, on 9 November 2022, Ýürekdepe village council was dissolved, and its two subordinate villages were brought under the jurisdiction of Çärjew village council.

== See also ==
- Cities of Turkmenistan
- Lebap Province
