= Kerki-Kerkichi Bridge =

Kerki-Kerkichi Bridge Kerki-Kerkiçi köprüsi
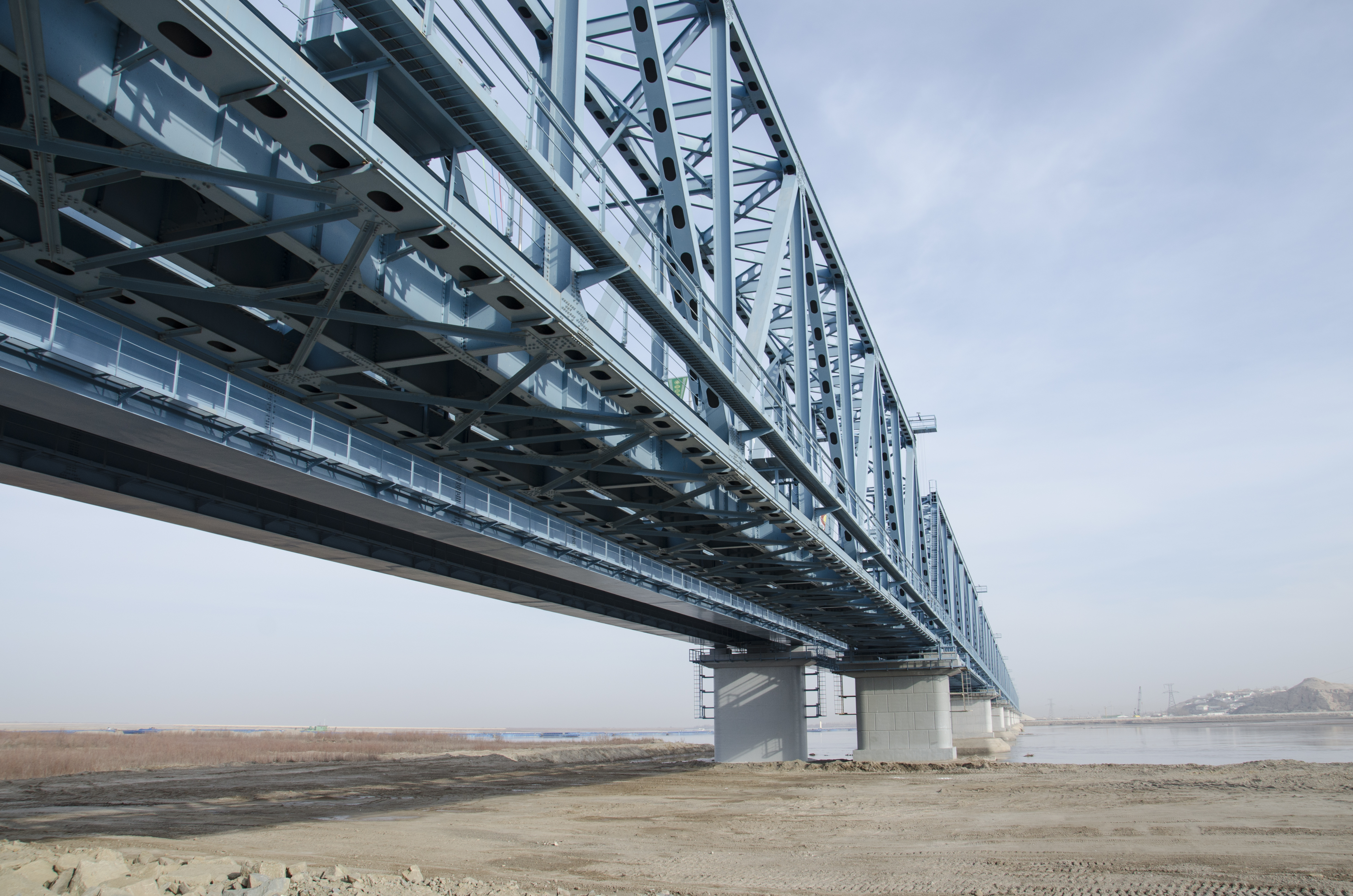
- The Kerki-Kerkichi Road Bridge
- Coordinates: 37°50′30″N 65°13′44″E
- Crosses: Amu Derya
- Locale: Kerki, Lebap, Turkmenistan

Characteristics
- Total length: 1,414 metres (4,639 ft)

History
- Constructed by: Altcom, Ukraine
- Construction end: 6 September 2009

The Kerki-Kerkichi Bridge is a bridge at Kerki, in Lebap Province of Turkmenistan, built over the river Amu Darya.

== Railway bridge ==
The cost of the bridge was $123 million. It was developed by the Ukrainian Institute Dneprogiprotrans. The general contractor of the corporation were the bridge builders Ukrtransstroi, who together with the Turkmen builders division of the Ministry of Railway, built this structure. According to specialists the bridge is able to withstand tremors of 8 on the Richter scale.

September 16, 2009, President of Turkmenistan Gurbanguly Berdimuhamedov and Viktor Yushchenko visited the Lebap region and solemnly dedicated the railway bridge Kerki-Kerkichi.

In the summer of 2011 the first passenger train drove over the bridge.

== Road bridge ==
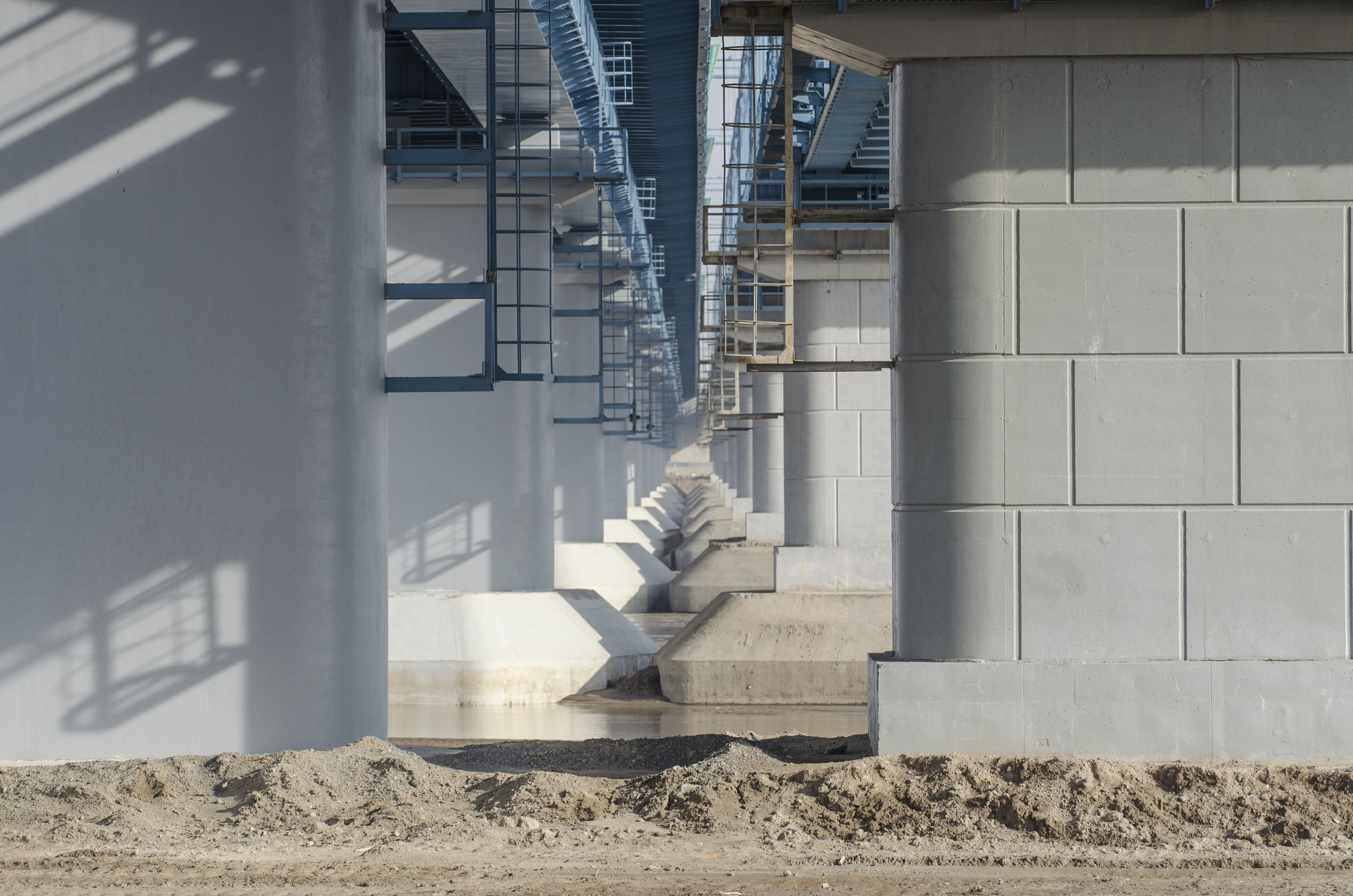

September 17, 2009 the President of Turkmenistan Gurbanguly Berdimuhamedov approved an agreement between the State Concern Turkmenavtoyollary with the Ukrainian company Altcom, which was the general contractor. The total cost of construction $159 million. The bridge was developed by Ukrainian Scientific Research Project Institute Soyuztransproekt and Ukrgiprobudmost. The bridge is designed for an earthquake measuring 9 on the Richter scale. In order to ensure the safety, German experts designed special bearings, provides a number of anti-seismic devices. Was also developed individual expansion joint, which receives all the longitudinal displacement, vibrations up to 1000 mm.

The work started in autumn 2009. The bridge includes a bridge length of 1414 m with a width of roadway - 11.5 m, the approach embankments, bank protection construction length of 6000 m. The bridge is on the new railway line Turmenabat-Kerki-Kerkichi. Were involved in the construction of about 600 people, including 130 specialists from Ukraine. As the pavement to the bridge, the metal base which in the summer can reach up to 70-80 degrees, used modern stuff matakryl. This multilayer polymer coating withstands high temperature and has a considerably higher strength characteristics as compared to asphalt. Under the bridge can easily pass judgment, because everyone has the ship's flight envelope with a width of 60 meters and a height of 9.5 meters.

February 14, 2013 with the participation of President of Ukraine Viktor Yanukovych and the President of Turkmenistan Gurbanguly Berdimuhamedov the bridge was inaugurated.

== Historic wooden railway bridge ==
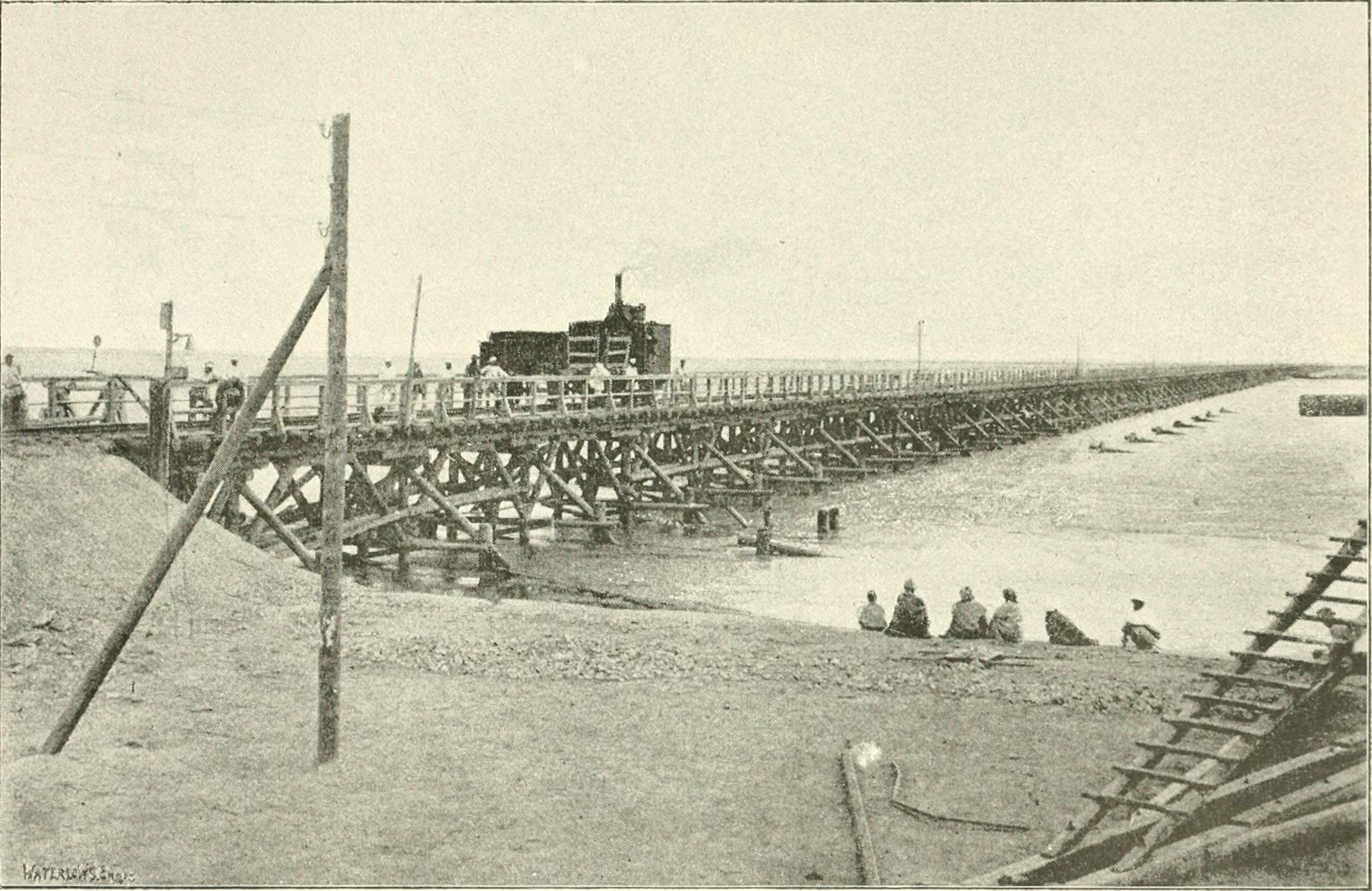
Railway bridge across the Amu Daria (length 1 mile 922 feet)

The first railway bridge was built from wood in the late 1880s. The principal bridge was 820 Russian sajenes or 5,740 English feet in length, and the three others were respectively 560, 392 and 196 feet, with the intervening dams of 2,429, 750 and 2,527 feet making a total length of bridges and dams from one bank to the other of two miles and 678 yards. This great work of bridging across the mighty and capricious waters of the Oxus cost altogether 301,674 roubles, of which 141,674 roubles were for labour, tools etc., and 160,000 roubles for material, all of which had to be brought from Russia. At first the intention was to make shift with some kind of a ferry to connect the two ends of the railway, and a considerable amount of money appears to have been wasted overpremature contracts made in England. A bridge of iron would have cost some six or seven millions, which was more than the estimates would bear, and so finally M. Bielinsky, a Polish engineer, was engaged to build it of wood. It is expected to last at least ten years. The trains could initially only crawl over it to reduce the risk of collapse.

== Links ==
- Bridge
- Video presentation
