= Trans-Karakum Railway =

Railway in Turkmenistan

The Trans-Karakum Railway is a 540 km (336 mi) long railway in the central Asian republic of Turkmenistan. The railway was officially completed on 19 February 2006.

The railway took over 1,500 workers more than five years to build, with 800 contractors working in the harsh conditions of the Karakum Desert. The railway was built using no foreign specialists - only companies and contractors from Turkmenistan were used. The opening ceremony was held at Içoguz (formerly Darvaza), where a white marble railway station with a capacity of 100 people a day was built for the event.

The railway takes 12 hours to traverse, halving the previous travel time between the two cities of Ashgabat and Dashoguz by replacing the route from through Mary and Lebap provinces and along the border with Uzbekistan with one 700 km (435 mi) shorter. There are 17 stations along the entire route, some serving existing villages, and others serving as a drop-off point for planned villages. Over 130 bridges span the various water features, and a new highway is also being constructed alongside the railway. It is the third large-scale project implemented since Turkmenistan's independence. Earlier, a 132 km (82 mi) stretch of the 280 km (174 mi) Tejen-Serakhs-Mashhad railway as well as the 205 km (127 mi) long Türkmenabat-Kerki railway were built in the country.
