= Kerki =

Kerki Kerki şäheri
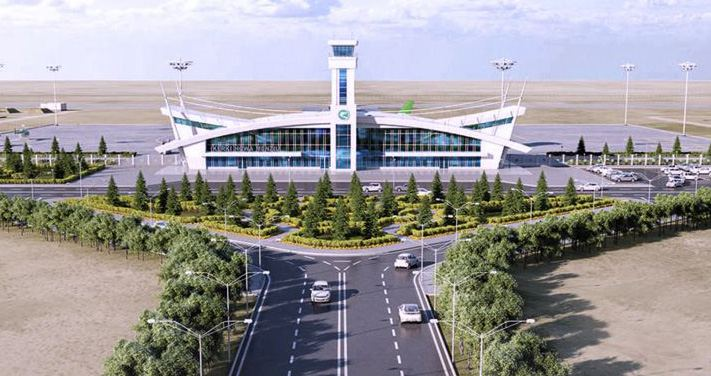
- Kerki airport

- Location in Turkmenistan
- Coordinates: 37°49′58″N 65°12′43″E
- Country: Turkmenistan
- Province: Lebap Province
- District: Kerki District

Population (2022 official census)
  - Total: 32,489
- Time zone: UTC+5

Kerki is a city in and capital of Kerki District, Lebap Province, Turkmenistan. It was formerly known as Zamm and, between 1999 and 2017, as Atamyrat.

== Geography ==
It is situated on a plain on the left bank of the Amu Darya river. Nearby towns and villages include Mukry (3.3 nm), Amydarýa (2.1 nm), Surhy (3.1 nm) and Kerkichi (2.2 nm).

=== Climate ===
Kerki has a cold semi-arid climate (BSk) according to the Köppen climate classification.

Climate data for Kerki (1991–2020)
Month	Jan	Feb	Mar	Apr	May	Jun	Jul	Aug	Sep	Oct	Nov	Dec	Year
Record high °C (°F)	24.4 (75.9)	29.9 (85.8)	35.4 (95.7)	39.0 (102.2)	42.8 (109.0)	44.4 (111.9)	46.0 (114.8)	45.5 (113.9)	41.1 (106.0)	36.7 (98.1)	32.9 (91.2)	27.4 (81.3)	46.0 (114.8)
Mean maximum °C (°F)	19.5 (67.1)	23.0 (73.4)	29.5 (85.1)	34.9 (94.8)	39.1 (102.4)	42.2 (108.0)	43.7 (110.7)	42.1 (107.8)	38.5 (101.3)	32.7 (90.9)	27.7 (81.9)	21.1 (70.0)	32.8 (91.0)
Daily mean °C (°F)	4.7 (40.5)	7.1 (44.8)	12.7 (54.9)	19.1 (66.4)	25.1 (77.2)	29.7 (85.5)	31.0 (87.8)	28.8 (83.8)	23.2 (73.8)	16.6 (61.9)	10.2 (50.4)	5.6 (42.1)	17.8 (64.0)
Mean minimum °C (°F)	−6.8 (19.8)	−5.8 (21.6)	−0.9 (30.4)	4.7 (40.5)	11.2 (52.2)	16.3 (61.3)	18.0 (64.4)	14.7 (58.5)	8.9 (48.0)	2.3 (36.1)	−2.9 (26.8)	−6.1 (21.0)	4.5 (40.1)
Record low °C (°F)	−22.8 (−9.0)	−19.0 (−2.2)	−6.9 (19.6)	−0.3 (31.5)	6.2 (43.2)	12.6 (54.7)	16.4 (61.5)	11.2 (52.2)	4.8 (40.6)	−3.6 (25.5)	−9.0 (15.8)	−20.9 (−5.6)	−22.8 (−9.0)
Average precipitation mm (inches)	25.7 (1.01)	36.9 (1.45)	37.0 (1.46)	28.2 (1.11)	10.0 (0.39)	1.7 (0.07)	0.9 (0.04)	0.0 (0.0)	0.2 (0.01)	3.5 (0.14)	17.6 (0.69)	23.3 (0.92)	185.0 (7.28)
Average precipitation days (≥ 1.0 mm)	16.1	18.4	17.5	13.9	6.7	1.1	0.3	0.0	0.4	2.4	12.0	12.2	100.9
Source: NOAA

== Etymology ==
According to Atanyyazow, the name Kerki is most likely of Persian origin, from ker ("fortress") and kuh ("mountain"), meaning "fortress on a mountain". However, Muqaddasī and de Goeje assert it is a Turkified pronunciation of the Persian name Karkuh (کرکوه), meaning "deaf mountain". The ancient name, Zamm, is of obscure origin.

On 29 December 1999, by Parliamentary Resolution HM-60, the city and district of Kerki were renamed Atamyrat in honor of Atamyrat Nyýazow, father of Saparmurat Niyazov, who had worked in Kerki as a teacher before being killed in World War II. On 25 November 2017, by Parliamentary Resolution No. 679-V, Atamyrat was changed back to Kerki for both the city and the district.

In Turkmen, the word "Kerki" refers to a "pick" or a "mattock." On the other bank of the Amu-Darya lies the town of Kerkiçi; The suffix "-çi" refers to a profession. Thus, Kerkiçi could be translated as "Miner," "Digger," or "the one who digs/mines." The two towns might share a common etymology.

== Architecture ==
The urban core consists of numerous one-story brick structures dating back to the period of the Russian Empire.

== Transportation ==
=== Air ===
The town is served by the new Kerki Airport, which replaced a defunct municipal airport in 2021.

=== Road ===
Kerki lies on the P-36 and P-39 highways, which both lead northwest to Turkmenabat, one on each side of the Amu Darya. Nearby junctions connect to the P-89, which leads north to the border with Uzbekistan at Tallymerjen, and the P-37, which leads southeast to the border with Uzbekistan at Kelif. In the opposite direction the P-36 also continues south to a junction with the Kerki-Ymamnazar ýoly, which in turn leads to the border with Afghanistan at Ymamnazar. In February 2013, a road bridge connecting the city with Kerkichi was commissioned; it replaced an old pontoon bridge.

=== Rail ===
In 1999, the rail line from Türkmenabat to Kerki was finished, linking Kerki to the Turkmen railway network without having to detour into neighbouring Uzbekistan. In late 2016, a railway line was built south to Ymamnazar on the border with Afghanistan and further to Aqina, turning Kerki into a railway hub.

== Sights ==
Astana Baba Mausoleum is managed by the Kerki city museum, and consists of a minaret and tomb built in the 11th century. Allamberdar Mausoleum (ru) is also part of the Kerki city museum. This 11th-century building represents Seljuk architecture of northern Khorasan.

== See also ==
- List of cities, towns and villages in Turkmenistan
- List of cities in Turkmenistan
