= List of World Heritage Sites in Turkmenistan =

Location of World Heritage Sites in Turkmenistan. Orange dots indicate the Cold Winter Deserts of Turan sites and blue dots are the Silk Roads: Zarafshan-Karakum Corridor sites.

The United Nations Educational, Scientific and Cultural Organization (UNESCO) World Heritage Sites are places of importance to cultural or natural heritage as described in the UNESCO World Heritage Convention, established in 1972. Cultural heritage consists of monuments (such as architectural works, monumental sculptures, or inscriptions), groups of buildings, and sites (including archaeological sites). Natural heritage consists of natural features (physical and biological formations), geological and physiographical formations (including habitats of threatened species of animals and plants), and natural sites which are important from the point of view of science, conservation, or natural beauty. Turkmenistan accepted the convention on 30 September 1994, making its historical sites eligible for inclusion on the list. As of 2025, Turkmenistan has five World Heritage Sites and a further nine sites on its tentative list.

The first site in Turkmenistan added to the list was the city of Merv, in 1999. The two most recent sites were added in 2023 and are shared with other countries. The Silk Roads: Zarafshan-Karakum Corridor is shared with Tajikistan and Uzbekistan, while the Cold Winter Deserts of Turan is shared with Kazakhstan and Uzbekistan. The later is the only natural site in Turkmenistan, the other four are listed for their cultural significance.

== World Heritage Sites ==
UNESCO lists sites under ten criteria; each entry must meet at least one of the criteria. Criteria i through vi are cultural, and vii through x are natural.

* Transnational site

World Heritage Sites
Site	Image	Location (region)	Year listed	UNESCO data	Description
State Historical and Cultural Park “Ancient Merv”	Ancient city ruins	Mary	1999	886; ii, iii (cultural)	Merv was an oasis city of great importance in Central Asia. The area was inhabited already in the Bronze Age in the 3rd millennium BCE. It was an important city of the Silk Road and served as the capital of the Abbasid Caliphate in the early 9th century and of the Seljuk Empire in the 12th century. The city was destroyed by the Mongols under Tolui in 1221, with almost the entire population killed. It was partially rebuilt in the 15th and 16th centuries. The ruins of the Great Kyz Kala, a fortress, are pictured.
Kunya-Urgench	Sultan Tekesh Mausoleum, Konye-Urgench, Turkmenistan.	Daşoguz	2005	1199; ii, iii (cultural)	Urgench is situated in north-western Turkmenistan, on the left bank of the Amu Daria River. Urgench was the capital of the Khorezm region, part of the Achaemenid Empire. The old town contains a series of monuments mainly from the 11th to 16th centuries, including a mosque, the gates of a caravanserai, fortresses, mausoleums and a 60-m high minaret. The monuments testify to outstanding achievements in architecture and craftsmanship whose influence reached Iran and Afghanistan, and later the architecture of the Mogul Empire of 16th-century India.
Parthian Fortresses of Nisa	A view of Nisa, an ancient parthian capital, now in Turkmenistan	Ahal	2007	1242; ii, iii (cultural)	The Parthian Fortresses of Nisa consist of two tells of Old and New Nisa, indicating the site of one of the earliest and most important cities of the Parthian Empire, a major power from the mid 3rd century BC to the 3rd century AD. They conserve the unexcavated remains of an ancient civilization which skilfully combined its own traditional cultural elements with those of the Hellenistic and Roman west. Archaeological excavations in two parts of the site have revealed richly decorated architecture, illustrative of domestic, state and religious functions. Situated at the crossroads of important commercial and strategic axes, this powerful empire formed a barrier to Roman expansion while serving as an important communication and trading centre between east and west, north and south.
Silk Roads: Zarafshan-Karakum Corridor*	Medieval fortress of Amul	Lebap, Mary	2023	1675; ii, iii, v (cultural)	The Zarafshan-Karakum Corridor is a key section of the Silk Roads in Central Asia that connects other corridors from all directions. Located in rugged mountains, fertile river valleys, and uninhabitable desert, the 866-kilometre corridor runs from east to west along the Zarafshan River and further southwest following the ancient caravan roads crossing the Karakum Desert to the Merv Oasis. Channelling much of the east–west exchange along the Silk Roads from the 2nd century BCE to the 16th century CE, a large quantity of goods was traded along the corridor. People travelled, settled, conquered, or were defeated here, making it a melting pot of ethnicities, cultures, religions, sciences, and technologies.
Cold Winter Deserts of Turan*	Desert scene with a plant behind	Ahal, Daşoguz, Lebap	2023	1693; ix, x (natural)	This property, shared with Kazakhstan and Uzbekistan, comprises 14 sites that represent the ecosystems of Central Asian deserts with harsh continental climate with very cold winters and hot summers. The deserts are home to numerous plant species, as well as saiga antelope and goitered gazelle. Four areas are listed in Turkmenistan: Bereketli Garagum Nature Reserve, Gaplaňgyr Nature Reserve, Repetek Biosphere State Reserve (pictured), and Yeradzhi Desert.

== Tentative list ==
In addition to sites inscribed on the World Heritage List, member states can maintain a list of tentative sites that they may consider for nomination. Nominations for the World Heritage List are only accepted if the site was previously listed on the tentative list. As of November 2025, Turkmenistan has listed nine properties on its tentative list.

Tentative sites
Site	Image	Location (region)	Year listed	UNESCO criteria	Description
Dehistan / Mishrian		Balkan	1998	i, ii, iii, iv, v (cultural)	
Badhyz State Nature Reserve		Mary, Ahal	2009	vii, ix, x (natural)	
Syunt Hasardag State Nature Reserve		Balkan	2009	x (natural)	
Dinosaurs and Caves of Koytendag		Lebap	2009	viii, x (natural)	
Repetek Biosphere State Reserve		Lebap	2009	x (natural)	
Amudarya State Nature Reserve		Lebap	2009	x (natural)	
Hazar State Nature Reserve		Balkan	2009	x (natural)	
Silk Roads Sites in Turkmenistan		Ahal, Balkan, Daşoguz, Lebap, Mary	2010	ii, iii, iv, v, vi (cultural)	
Karst, Canyons, and Caves of Kugitang*		Lebap	2025	vii, viii, x	This transnational nomination shared with Uzbekistan covers the southwestern part of the Pamir-Alay Range, including mountains, cold winter deserts and semi-deserts. The local caves have exceptional crystal formations, and the area, with its complex karst system, is home to both typical Central Asian species and those endemic to the region. Kugitang also has a high density of fossil formations and dinosaur footprints. From Turkmenistan, Koytendag State Nature Reserve, Garlyk Wildlife Sanctuary, Khojapil Wildlife Sanctuary, and Khojagaraul Wildlife Sanctuary are nominated.

== See also ==
- List of Intangible Cultural Heritage elements in Turkmenistan
