= Guryhowdan Sanctuary =

Sanctuary in Turkmenistan

- IUCN category IV (habitat/species management area)
- Location within Turkmenistan
- Location: Ahal Province, Turkmenistan
- Nearest city: Asgabat
- Coordinates: 37.716°N 58.599°E
- Area: 15,000 ha (37,000 acres)
- Established: 1976

Guryhowdan Sanctuary is a sanctuary (zakaznik) of Turkmenistan.

It is part of Köpetdag Nature Reserve. Its purpose of creation is studying, preservation of all natural complex of the Central Köpetdag, maintenance of necessary conditions of dwelling and rest for migrant birds, restoration of specific structure of rare and valuable kinds of animals, in particular kulans.
