= Garlyk (village) =

Garlyk Garlyk obasy
- Village
- Location in Turkmenistan
- Coordinates: 37°35′23″N 66°20′26″E
- Country: Turkmenistan
- Province: Lebap Province
- District: Köýtendag District
- Town: Garlyk

Population (2022 official census)
  - Total: 879
- Time zone: UTC+5

Garlyk, also known as Karlyuk (in Russian: Карлюк), is a village in the Köýtendag District, Lebap Province, Turkmenistan. It is located circa 25 km north of Kelif, 25 km northeast of Köýtendag, and 20 km north of the town of Garlyk to which it is subordinate. In 2022, it had a population of 879 people.

== Etymology ==
Garlyk is a Turkmen word based on the word "Gar," which means "Snow." Along with the suffix "-lyk," the name refers to a "Snowy/Snow-covered place."

The name of the town is borrowed from the nearby Garlyk caves, which also gave their name to the town of Garlyk and the wildlife sanctuary of Garlyk, included in Köýtendag Nature Reserve.

== History ==
Garlyk was once the center of its own rural council; when the town of Garlyk was established, the rural council was abolished and the villages of Garlyk and Künjek were transferred under Garlyk's jurisdiction.

In March 2017, a Turkmen and Belarusian project for a refining facility for fertilizers near Garlyk was jointly inaugurated by Gurbanguly Berdimuhamedow and Alexander Lukashenko, respectively presidents of Turkmenistan and Belarus.

== Subordination ==
The village is under the jurisdiction of the town of Garlyk along with two other villages:

- Garlyk, town
  - Garlyk, village
  - Hojak, village
  - Künjek, village

== See also ==
- List of municipalities in Lebap Province
- List of cities, towns and villages in Turkmenistan
