= Kopet Dag woodlands and forest steppe =

Ecoregion in Turkmenistan and Iran

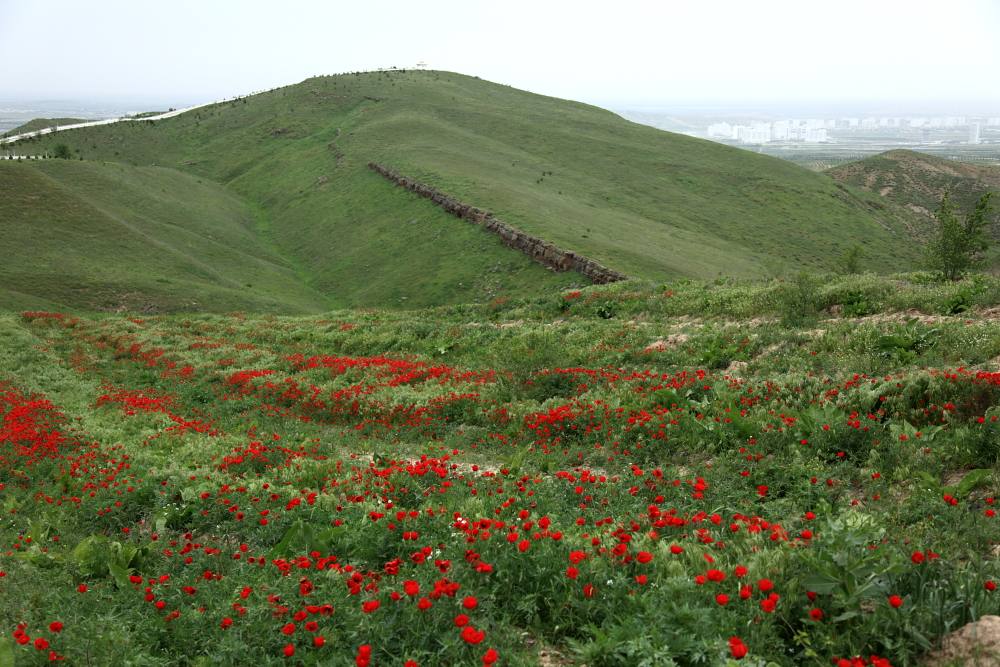
- Hills outside of the city of Ashgabat

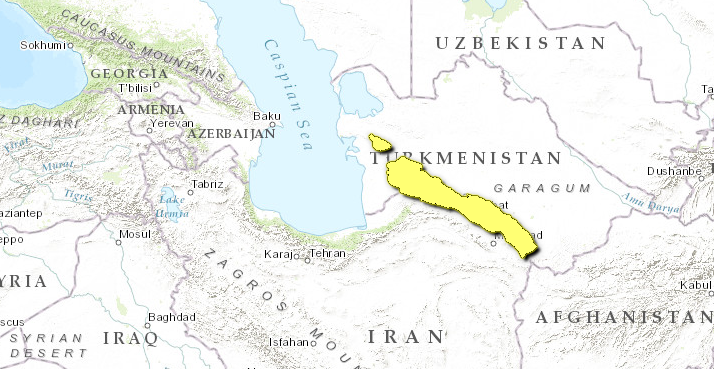
- Ecoregion territory (in yellow)

Ecology
- Realm: Palearctic
- Biome: Montane grasslands and shrublands

Geography
- Area: 58,274 km^{2} (22,500 sq mi)
- Country: Turkmenistan, Iran
- Coordinates: 38.25°N 57.75°E

The Kopet Dag woodlands and forest steppe ecoregion (WWF ID: PA1008) coincides with the Kopet Dag mountains, straddling the southern border of Turkmenistan and the northeastern border of Iran. The region is one of high biodiversity, as it includes a full range of altitude zones (from semi-desert low hills at 300 metres (980 ft) to rocky heights over 2,800 metres (9,200 ft)), and variety of habitats included juniper-wooded slopes, montane grasslands, and tugay (riverine thickets).

== Location and description ==
The region begins at the western foothills of the Kopet Dag, about 100 km east of the Caspian Sea. It stretches for 650 km from northwest to southeast, with the Turkmenistan-Iran border running mostly down the main central ridge, and ends at the border with Afghanistan. The region is only about 100 km wide. The Kopet Dag semi-desert ecoregion wraps around the western third of the ecoregion, the Central Asian southern desert ecoregions lies to the rest of the north, and the Central Persian desert basins ecoregion to the south.

== Climate ==
The climate of the ecoregion is Cold desert climate (Köppen climate classification (BWk)). This climate features hot desert conditions in the summer, but cooler than hot deserts. Winters are cold and dry. At least one month averages below 0 °C (32 °F). Annual precipitation is typically 300 mm.

== Flora and fauna ==
Because the region is surrounded on all sides by desert and semi-desert, the flora and fauna are relatively isolated, with many endemic species. Up to 18% of flowering plants may be endemic; one source notes 332 endemic plant species. A variety of springs and streams support lush grasslands. A characteristic woodland type in the region is the "shiblyak", featuring Turkmen maple (Acer tucomanicum), a short 2-3 meter high tree adapted to the dry conditions and able to regenerate after fire or disturbance. Other plants tolerate of the low moisture (xerophytes) include the Hawthorne (Crataegus) and Jerusalem thorn (Paliurus spina-christi).

== Protections ==
Significant protected areas in the ecoregion include:

- Tandooreh National Park, a section of deep valleys and steep, Juniper-wooded slopes, in the center of the Kopet Dag in Iran.
- Ors Sistan protected area, best juniper woodland in the East of Iran
- Köpetdag Nature Reserve, four separate areas in the central Kopet Dag on the Turkmenistan side.
- Sünt-Hasardag Nature Reserve, on the western edge of the mountains.
