= Şasenem Sanctuary =

Protected area in Turkmenistan

- Location: Daşoguz Province, Turkmenistan
- Area: 169,102 ha (417,860 acres)
- Established: 1984

Şasenem Sanctuary is a sanctuary (zakaznik) of Turkmenistan.

It is part of Gaplaňgyr Nature Reserve. It was established for the breeding and settling of kulans, Equus hemionus kulan, a subspecies of onager, the Asian wild ass.
