= Garlyk =

Garlyk Garlyk şäherçesi
- Town
- Location in Turkmenistan
- Coordinates: 37°24′54″N 66°19′58″E
- Country: Turkmenistan
- Province: Lebap Province
- District: Köýtendag District
- Establishment: 26 November 2010

Population (2022 official census)
  - Town: 1,774
  - Urban: 16
  - Rural: 1,758
- Time zone: UTC+5

Garlyk is a new town located in the Köýtendag District, Lebap Province, Turkmenistan. It was founded on 26 November 2010 and granted township status at the same time. In 2022, it had a population of 16 people, making it the least populated urban-type settlement in Turkmenistan.

== Etymology ==
Garlyk is a Turkmen word based on the word "Gar," which means "Snow." Along with the suffix "-lyk," the name refers to a "Snowy/Snow-covered place."

The name of the town is borrowed from the nearby Garlyk caves, which also gave their name to the village of Garlyk and the wildlife sanctuary of Garlyk, included in Köýtendag Nature Reserve.

== History ==
Garlyk was built circa 5 km north of the town of Kelif, 10 km north of Afghanistan, and 15 km west of Uzbekistan. It is located at the southern end of the Köýtendag Range, between the Garajadag and Gyýançagal Ranges. The town was established on 26 November 2010. Its construction was completed on 5 June 2013, as stated on the monument in front of the park.

Reportedly, the town was built to house the workers of the new refining facility built jointly with Belarus.

In 2022, the national census revealed a population of 16 people, highlighting a very poor success among the local population. In 2015, RFE/RL investigated and reported that the poor success of this project is mainly due to housing prices and transport; although the town owns some of the most modern infrastructure in the country, there are circa 52 housing units available for $50,000–$80,000, while there is no train serving the town. According to RFE/RL, it would take circa 2 days to travel from Garlyk to Türkmenabat, capital of Lebap Province.

== Economy ==
In March 2017, a Turkmen and Belarusian project for a refining facility for fertilizers was jointly inaugurated by Gurbanguly Berdimuhamedow and Alexander Lukashenko, respectively presidents of Turkmenistan and Belarus. The facility is located near the village of Garlyk.

== Dependencies ==
There are three villages under Garlyk's jurisdiction:

- Garlyk, town
  - Garlyk, village
  - Hojak, village
  - Künjek, village

== See also ==
- List of municipalities in Lebap Province
- Towns of Turkmenistan
