= Hojagarawul Sanctuary =

Sanctuary in Turkmenistan

- Location: Lebap Province, Turkmenistan
- Area: 6,011 ha (14,850 acres)
- Established: 1999

Hojagarawul Sanctuary is a sanctuary (zakaznik) of Turkmenistan and a part of Köýtendag Nature Reserve.

== Sites ==
=== Karlyuk Cave ===
An underground network of ~50 km. of caves, it contains numerous subterranean lakes home to the endemic Starostin's loach.

=== Kainar Baba ===
One of the few hot sulfide springs in Turkmenistan, this is a popular bathing spot.
