= Hojaburjybelent Sanctuary =

Protected area in Turkmenistan

- Location: Lebap Province, Turkmenistan
- Area: 31,635 ha (78,170 acres)
- Established: 1986

Hojaburjybelent Sanctuary is a sanctuary (zakaznik) of Turkmenistan.

It is part of Köýtendag Nature Reserve. It was established for the preservation and reclaiming of pistachio woods, protection of the habitat of animals.
