= Gyzyljar Sanctuary =

Protected area in Turkmenistan

- Location: Mary Province, Turkmenistan
- Area: 30,000 ha (74,000 acres)
- Established: 1956

Gyzyljar Sanctuary is a sanctuary (zakaznik) of Turkmenistan.

It is part of Bathyz Nature Reserve. It was established as a place for foaling and lambing of animals.
