= Çemenebit Sanctuary =

Sanctuary in Turkmenistan

Ogurjaly Sanctuary
- Location: Mary Province, Turkmenistan
- Area: 12,000 ha (30,000 acres)
- Established: 1956

Çemenebit Sanctuary is a sanctuary (zakaznik) of Turkmenistan.

It is part of Bathyz Nature Reserve. It was established as a watering place for Asiatic wild ass subspecies, the Turkmenian kulans (Equus hemionus kulan).
