= Kopet Dag semi-desert =

Ecoregion in Turkmenistan and Iran

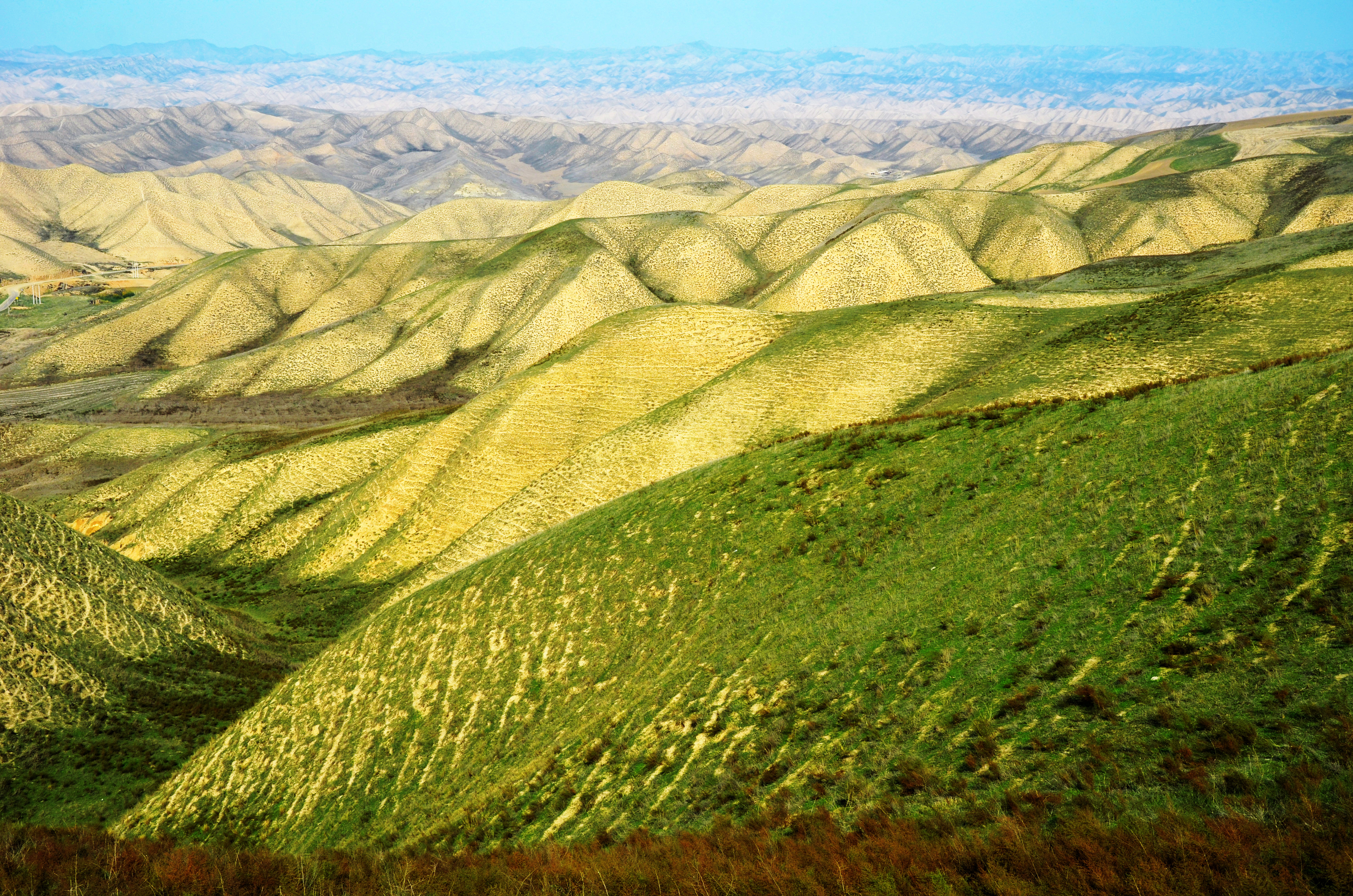
- Golestan - Torkaman Sahra at the southern edge of the ecoregion

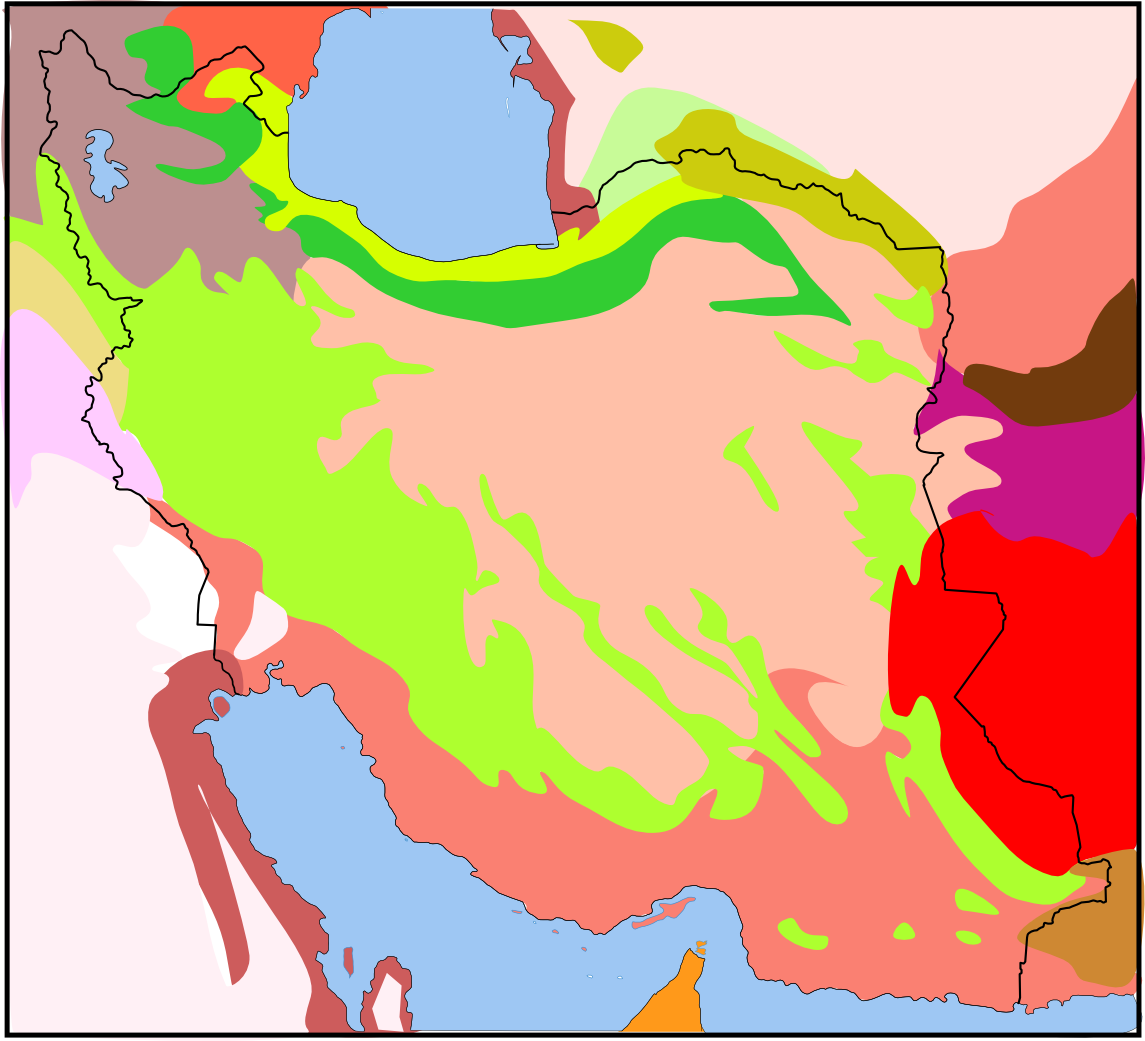
- Ecoregion territory (light green, straddling border of Iran and Turkmenistan)

Ecology
- Realm: Palearctic
- Biome: Deserts and xeric shrublands

Geography
- Area: 26,418 km^{2} (10,200 sq mi)
- Country: Turkmenistan, Iran
- Coordinates: 38.25°N 55.75°E

The Kopet Dag semi-desert ecoregion (WWF ID: PA1319) is a small ecoregion that crosses the border of southwestern Turkmenistan into northeastern Iran. It covers a transition zone between the deserts to the north and west, and the foothill steppes and woodlands in the higher Kopet Dag mountains to the east and the Alborz Mountains to the south. The terrain is mostly barren semi-desert and widespread 'takir', a type of seasonal salt flat or dried clay deposit in an interdune depression.

== Location and description ==
The region is mostly at a low altitude along the base of the mountains, particularly in a 20 km (12 mi) wide strip of cultivated land that reaches 300 km (190 mi) east to the capital city of Ashgabat. The Caspian lowland desert ecoregion occupies a 20 km wide strip of land between the Kopet Dag semi-desert and the Caspian Sea. To the north is another desert, the Central Asian southern desert. To the south are the Kopet Dag woodlands and forest steppe ecoregion, and the Caspian Hyrcanian mixed forests ecoregion. The ecoregion is about 350 km (220 mi) from west to east, and 200 km (120 mi) from north to south.

== Climate ==
The climate of the ecoregion is Cold semi-arid climate (Köppen climate classification (BSk)). This climate is characteristic of steppe climates intermediary between desert humid climates, and typically have precipitation is above evapotranspiration. At least one month averages below 0 °C (32 °F). Precipitation may reach 200 mm/year.

== Flora and fauna ==
Much of the region is devoid of vegetation. But there is significant cultivation in the strip on the northern edge of the Kopet Dag. There is also herbaceous ground cover and cultivation in the southern 50–100 km (31–62 mi) of the region, particularly in Iran.

== Protections ==
There are few protected areas in the ecoregion. A small portion of Golestan National Park in Iran crosses into the Kopet Dag semi-desert.
