= Mäne-Çäçe Sanctuary =

Protected area in Turkmenistan

- Location: Ahal Province, Turkmenistan
- Area: 60,000 ha (150,000 acres)
- Established: 1976

Mäne-Çäçe Sanctuary is a sanctuary (zakaznik) of Turkmenistan.

It is part of Köpetdag Nature Reserve. Its purpose of creation is studying, preservation of all natural complex of the Central Köpetdag, maintenance of necessary conditions of dwelling and rest for migrant birds, restoration of specific structure of rare and valuable kinds of animals, in particular the Turkmenian kulans.
