= Kelif Sanctuary =

Protected area in Turkmenistan

- Interactive map of Kelif Sanctuary
- Location: Lebap Province, Turkmenistan
- Established: 1970

Kelif Sanctuary is a wildlife sanctuary (zakaznik) in Turkmenistan.

It is part of Köýtendag Nature Reserve. It was established for the protection of natural complex, creation of favorable conditions for wintering of migrant and natatorial birds.
