= List of Intangible Cultural Heritage elements in Turkmenistan =

Location of Turkmenistan

The United Nations Educational, Scientific and Cultural Organization (UNESCO) defines intangible cultural heritage elements as non-physical traditions and practices performed by a people. As part of a country's cultural heritage, they include celebrations, festivals, performances, oral traditions, music, and the making of handicrafts. The term intangible cultural heritage is formally established by the Convention for the Safeguarding of the Intangible Cultural Heritage, which was drafted in 2003 and took effect in 2006. The inscription of new heritage elements on UNESCO's Intangible Cultural Heritage Lists for protection and safeguarding is determined by the Intergovernmental Committee for the Safeguarding of Intangible Cultural Heritage, an organization established by the Convention. Turkmenistan ratified the Convention on 25 November 2011.

National lists are required by the Convention for the further nomination of elements to the UNESCO lists.

== Intangible Cultural Heritage of Humanity ==
UNESCO's Intangible Cultural Heritage of Humanity consists of three lists: the Representative List of the Intangible Cultural Heritage of Humanity, the List of Intangible Cultural Heritage in Need of Urgent Safeguarding, and the Register of Good Safeguarding Practices. Turkmenistan only has elements inscribed on the Representative List.

† Transnational element

=== Representative List ===
This list aims to represent the intangible cultural heritage of Turkmenistan worldwide and bring awareness to its significance.

Intangible Cultural Heritage elements recognized by UNESCO
Name	Media	Year	No.	Description
Epic art of Gorogly		2015	01028	
Kushtdepdi rite of singing and dancing	People dressed in colorful clothing and fur hats celebrating the 20th anniversary of Turkmen Independence.	2017	01259	
Traditional turkmen carpet making art in Turkmenistan	A carpet with the Bukhara pattern, a multicoloured geometric design	2019	01486	
Dutar making craftsmanship and traditional music performing art combined with singing		2021	01565	
Telling tradition of Nasreddin Hodja/ Molla Nesreddin/ Molla Ependi/ Apendi/ Afendi Kozhanasyr Anecdotes † (Note: Shared with Azerbaijan, Kazakhstan, Kyrgyzstan, Tajksitan, Türkiye, and Uzbekistan.)	A 17th-century miniature of Nasruddin	2022	01705	
Sericulture and traditional production of silk for weaving † (Note: Shared with Afghanistan, Azerbaijan, Iran, Türkiye, Tajikistan, and Uzbekistan.)		2022	01890	
Turkmen-style needlework art † (Note: Shared with Iran)		2022	01876	
Art of Akhal-Teke horse breeding and traditions of horses' decoration		2023	01978	
Nawrouz, Novruz, Nowrouz, Nowrouz, Nawrouz, Nauryz, Nooruz, Nowruz, Navruz, Nevruz, Nowruz, Navruz † (Note: Shared with Afghanistan, Azerbaijan, India, Iran, Iraq, Kazakhstan, Kyrgyzstan, Mongolia, Pakistan, Tajikistan, Turkey, and Uzbekistan.)	Girl with torch on mountainside	2024	02097	
The art of breeding Turkmen alabay		2025	02269	

== See also ==
- List of World Heritage Sites in Turkmenistan
- Culture of Turkmenistan
- Tourism in Turkmenistan
