= Sünt-Hasardag Sanctuary =

Protected area in Turkmenistan

- Location: Balkan Province, Turkmenistan
- Area: 3,800 ha (9,400 acres)
- Established: 1990

Sünt-Hasardag Sanctuary is a sanctuary (zakaznik) of Turkmenistan.

It is part of Sünt-Hasardag Nature Reserve. It was separated from the Central site of the reserve with a view of improving the social and economic conditions of the population of Magtymguly District.
