= Sarygamyş Sanctuary =

Protected area in Turkmenistan

- Interactive map of Sarygamyş Sanctuary
- Location: Daşoguz Province, Turkmenistan
- Coordinates: 42°0′0″N 57°30′0″E
- Area: 551,066 ha (1,361,710 acres)
- Established: 1980

Sarygamyş Sanctuary is a sanctuary (zakaznik) of Turkmenistan.

It is part of Gaplaňgyr Nature Reserve. It was established for the protection of beaches of Sarygamyş Lake, flying natatorial birds and lambing places of gazelles.
