= Pulhatyn Sanctuary =

Protected area in Turkmenistan

- Location: Mary Province, Turkmenistan
- Area: 15,000 ha (37,000 acres)
- Established: 1956

Pulhatyn Sanctuary is a sanctuary (zakaznik) of Turkmenistan.

It is part of Bathyz Nature Reserve. It was established as a watering place for animals.
