= Ashgabat Zoo =

Zoo in Ahal Region, Turkmenistan

Coordinates: 38°02′19″N 58°02′56″E

- Interactive map of Ashgabat Zoo
- Date opened: 1932 (original location); 12 October 2010 (current location)
- Location: Gökdere, Gökdepe District, Ahal Region, Turkmenistan
- Land area: 40 hectares (99 acres)
- No. of species: 250

The National Museum of Wildlife (Turkmen: Janly tebigatyň milli muzeýi), commonly known in English as Ashgabat Zoo (Turkmen: Aşgabat haýwanat bagy), is a zoological garden—zoo—located in the locality of Gökdere, Gökdepe District, Ahal Region, Turkmenistan, just west of the capital Ashgabat. It covers an area of roughly 40 hectares (99 acres) and houses over 250 species. It is administered by the Ministry of Nature Protection, a sub-ministry of the Ministry of Agriculture and Environmental Protection of Turkmenistan.

== History ==
Ashgabat Zoo, originally located near Teke Bazaar within Ashgabat, first opened in the Turkmen Soviet Socialist Republic in 1932. (Note: Turkmenistan achieved independence in 1991.) By 2005, the zoo was described as derelict and the enclosures too small to sufficiently house the animals, with dictator Saparmurat Niyazov having announced plans to relocate the zoo to a more spacious location. The zoo moved to its current location in Gökdere on 12 October 2010. Animals from dictator Gurbanguly Berdimuhamedow's personal menagerie were also moved to the new location. During its opening day, visitors complained about the lack of shade or water provided for the animals. An employee at the zoo told the Institute for War and Peace Reporting that there were "temporary difficulties" due to a nearby construction site consuming much of the available water. In July 2020 during the COVID-19 pandemic, Ashgabat Zoo limited its activities to help prevent the spread of COVID-19. It resumed normal activities in April 2021, although private news agency Arzuw reports that it only fully reopened in April 2022.

== Fauna ==
Some 40 hectares (99 acres) in size, Ashgabat Zoo has over 250 different species of fauna. It is administered by the Ministry of Nature Protection, a sub-ministry of the Ministry of Agriculture and Environmental Protection of Turkmenistan. Excluding the indoor aquarium, the enclosures are divided into four zones—African savannah, predators, ungulates, and aviary.

== See also ==
- Wildlife of Turkmenistan
