= Ogurjaly Sanctuary =

Protected area in Turkmenistan

- Interactive map of Ogurjaly Sanctuary
- Location: Balkan Province, Turkmenistan
- Coordinates: 38°48′10″N 53°04′02″E
- Area: 7,000 ha (17,000 acres)

Ogurjaly Sanctuary is a sanctuary (zakaznik) of Turkmenistan.

It is located on the Ogurchinskiy Island. It is part of Hazar Nature Reserve. It was established for semifree maintenance and livestock reproduction of gazelles.
