= Amudarya State Nature Reserve =

Nature reserve in Turkmenistan

Amyderýa Nature Reserve
- Location within Turkmenistan
- Location: Lebap Province, Turkmenistan
- Coordinates: 39°39′N 62°51′E
- Area: 495 km^{2}
- Established: 1982

Amyderýa Nature Reserve (Turkmen: Amyderýa goraghanasy) is a nature reserve (zapovednik) of north-eastern Turkmenistan.

Established in 1982 to protect part of the Amu Darya River, it is located in the north-east of Lebap Province and covers an area of 495 km^{2}.

It also incorporates one sanctuary:

- Kelif Sanctuary - established in 1970.
