= Protected areas of Turkmenistan =

Protected areas of Turkmenistan include nine nature reserves (zapovednik) and 13 sanctuaries (zakaznik) with a total area of 19,750 km^{2} or more than 4% of Turkmenistan's territory.

== Nature reserves ==
- Repetek Nature Reserve, in Lebap Province, East Karakum Desert, near Amu Darya. Created in 1927 for study and preservation of a sand-desert ecosystem. Area 346 km^{2}.
- Hazar Nature Reserve, on the south-east coast of the Caspian Sea, in Balkan Province. Area 2,690 km^{2}.
- Bathyz Nature Reserve, in Mary Province, between Kushka and Tejen rivers. Created in 1941 for the protection of the Badkhyz Plateau ecosystem. Area 877 km^{2}.
- Köpetdag Nature Reserve, in the central part of the Kopetdag Range (Ahal Province). Created in 1976 for the protection of indigenous flora and fauna. Area 497 km^{2}.
- Sünt-Hasardag Nature Reserve, in South-West Kopetdag (Balkan Province). Created in 1977 for the restoration and study of indigenous flora and fauna. Area 303 km^{2}.
- Gaplaňgyr Nature Reserve, at the border with Kazakhstan and Uzbekistan in the north-west (Daşoguz Province). Created in 1979 for the protection and restoration of indigenous flora and fauna of the Kaplkankyr Plateau and surrounding areas of Northern Turkmenistan. Area 2,822 km^{2}.
- Amyderýa Nature Reserve, in the north-east of Lebap Province on the Amu Darya. Created in 1982 with an area of 495 km^{2}.
- Köýtendag Nature Reserve (formerly Kugitang Nature Reserve), at the extreme east of the country, in the Köýtendag Range (Lebap Province). Created in 1986 with an area of 271.4 km^{2}.
- Bereketli Garagum Nature Reserve, created in 2013.

== Sanctuaries ==
- Chemenibit (Çemenebit Sanctuary) (within Bathyz Nature Reserve)
- Kyzyldzhar (Gyzyljar Sanctuary) (Bathyz Nature Reserve)
- Pulkhatyn (Pulhatyn Sanctuary) (Bathyz Nature Reserve)
- Meana-Chaаcha (Mäne-Çäçe Sanctuary) (Köpetdag Nature Reserve)
- Kurykhovdan (Guryhowdan Sanctuary) (Köpetdag Nature Reserve)
- Syunt-Khasardag (Sünt-Hasardag Sanctuary) (Sünt-Hasardag Nature Reserve)
- Sarykamysh (Sarygamyş Sanctuary) (on Sarygamyş Lake, in Gaplaňgyr Nature Reserve)
- Shasenem (Şasenem Sanctuary) (near Sarygamyş Lake, in Gaplaňgyr Nature Reserve)
- Kelif Sanctuary (south-east Lebap, within the Amyderýa Nature Reserve)
- Khodzhabuzhybelent (Hojaburjybelent Sanctuary) (Köýtendag Nature Reserve)
- Khodzhapil (Hojapil Sanctuary) (Köýtendag Nature Reserve)
- Karlyuk (Garlyk Sanctuary)(Köýtendag Nature Reserve)
- Hojagarawul Sanctuary (Köýtendag Nature Reserve)
- Ogurchinskiy (Ogurjaly Sanctuary) (on Ogurchinskiy Island in the Caspian Sea, off the west coast of Balkan Province, part of Hazar Nature Reserve)

Total area of sanctuaries is 11,560 km^{2} (2.6% of Turkmenistan's territory).
