= Central Asian southern desert =

Ecoregion

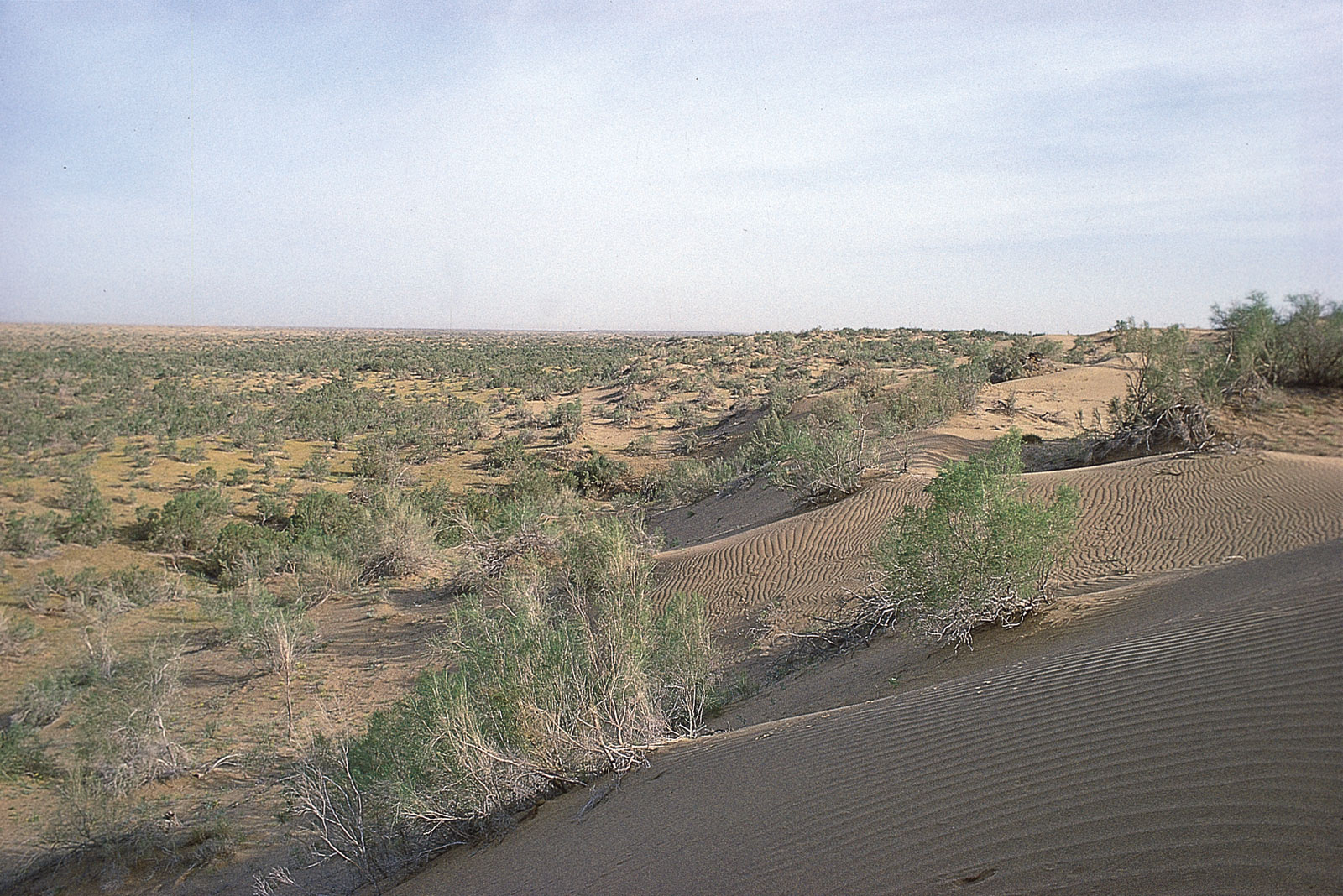
- Karakum Desert landscape in the center of the ecoregion

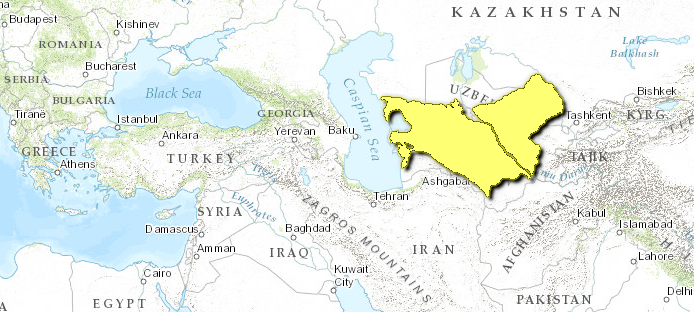
- Ecoregion territory (in yellow)

Ecology
- Realm: Palearctic
- Biome: Deserts and xeric shrublands

Geography
- Area: 566,689 km^{2} (218,800 mi^{2})
- Country: Kazakhstan, Uzbekistan, Turkmenistan
- Coordinates: 39°N 60°E

The Central Asian southern desert ecoregion (WWF ID: PA1312) is an arid but ecologically active region between the east coast of the Caspian Sea and steppes at the base of the mountains of central Asia. Most of Turkmenistan and eastern Uzbekistan is in this ecoregion. The winters are milder than in the cold desert to the north (the Central Asian northern desert ecoregion), and a large number of endemic species have adapted to living in the particular climate and soil of the region. As with sandy deserts in general, the region is notable for high numbers of endemic species of reptiles and insects.

== Location and description ==
The ecoregion covers the arid territory from the Caspian Sea on the west, almost to the Pamir-Alay Mountains to the east. Most of Turkmenistan and the eastern half of Uzbekistan is this region. Covered are the coastal plains of the Caspian, the Krasnovodsk and Ustyurt Plateaus of northwest Turkmenistan, the Karakum Desert ('Black Sand' desert) of central Turkmenistan, and the Kyzylkum Desert ('Red Sand' desert) of eastern Uzbekistan and a portion of southern Kazakhstan between the Syr Darya and Amu Darya Rivers. The ecoregion is bisected by the thin ecoregion of the Central Asian riparian woodlands of the Amu Darya River.

== Climate ==
The climate in the surrounding region is Cold desert climate (Köppen climate classification (BWk)). This climate features hot desert conditions in the summer, but cooler than hot deserts. Winters are cold and dry. At least one month averages below 0 °C (32 °F). Precipitation is 125–170 mm/year, with the little precipitation occurring in the winter and spring.

== Flora and fauna ==
Soil type and quality is one of the main drivers of plant species across the ecoregion. Sandy areas typically feature White saxaul (Haloxylon persicum) and Black saxaul (Haloxylon ammodendron), which are short hardy trees that are tolerant of drought and poor soils. They have extensive root systems to hold in the sand. Thin sandy and loamy soils support many species of sagebrush and salt-tolerate saltworts (Salsola). Saline solonchak soils support salt-tolerant succulent semi-shrubs such as Halostachys, Halocnemum strobilaceum and Seepweeds (Suaeda).

Common mammals include the long-eared hedgehog (Hemiechinus auritus), Brandt's hedgehog (Paraechinus hypomelas), and Tolai hare (Lepus tolai). Also common are gerbils and ten species of jerboas.

== Protections ==
Significant protected areas in the ecoregion include:

- Gaplaňgyr Nature Reserve, on the Gaplaňgyr Plateau spur of the Ustyurt Plateau in the northwest of the ecoregion. (Area: 2,822 km^{2} (1,090 sq mi))
- Repetek Biosphere State Reserve, in the eastern Karakum Desert, established for the study of desert ecological recovery. It features the Desert monitors (Desert monitor), and the Vulnerable Goitered Gazelle (Gazella subgutturosa). (Area: 346 km^{2} (134 sq mi))
- Badhyz State Nature Reserve, in the southern Karakum Desert, known for ungulate populations, including the Near-Threatened Onager (Asiatic Wild Ass, Equus hemionus). (Area: 877 km^{2} (339 sq mi))
