= Tourism in Turkmenistan =

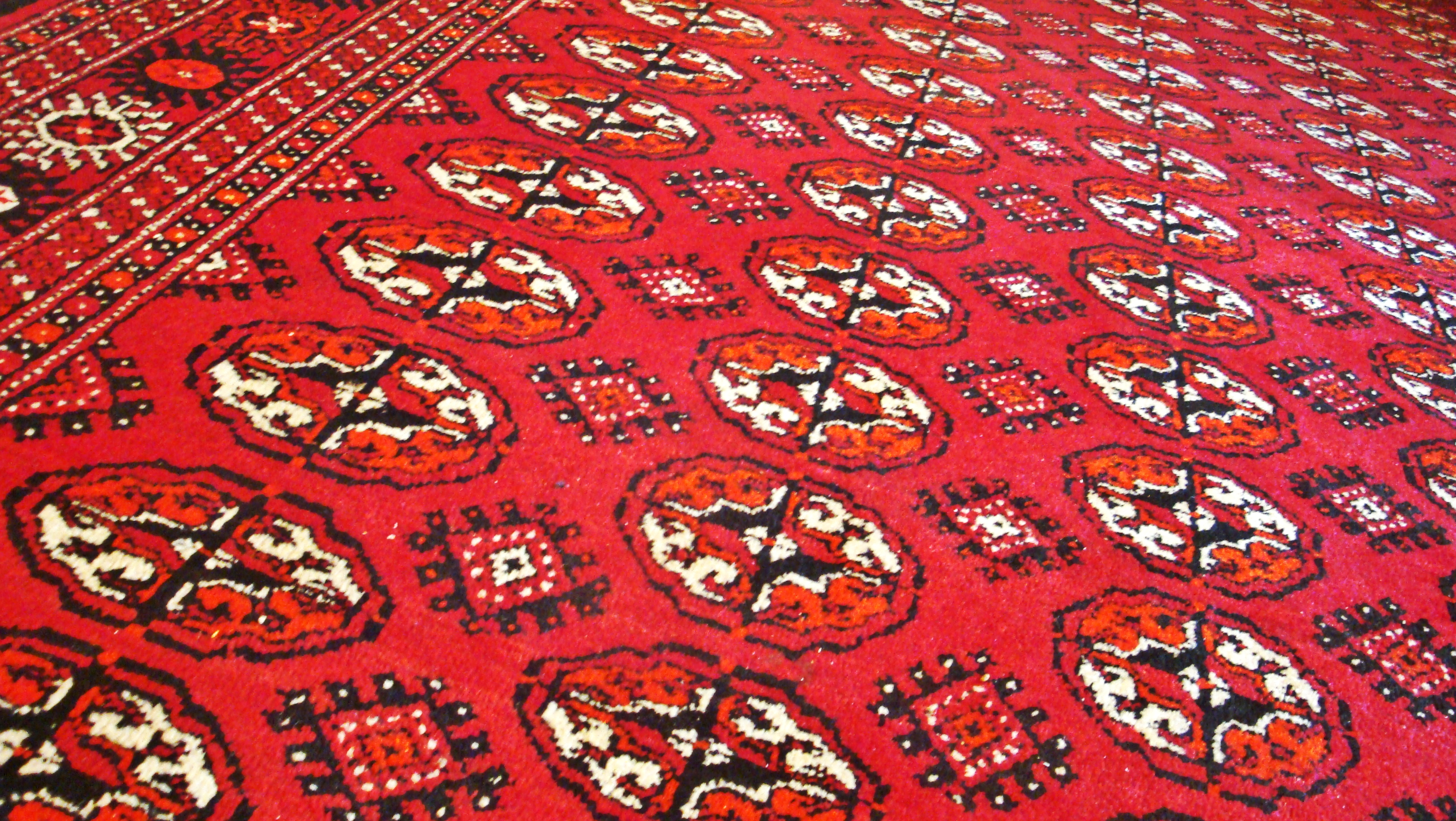
Turkmen Carpet, is an intanngible heritage of Turkmenistan

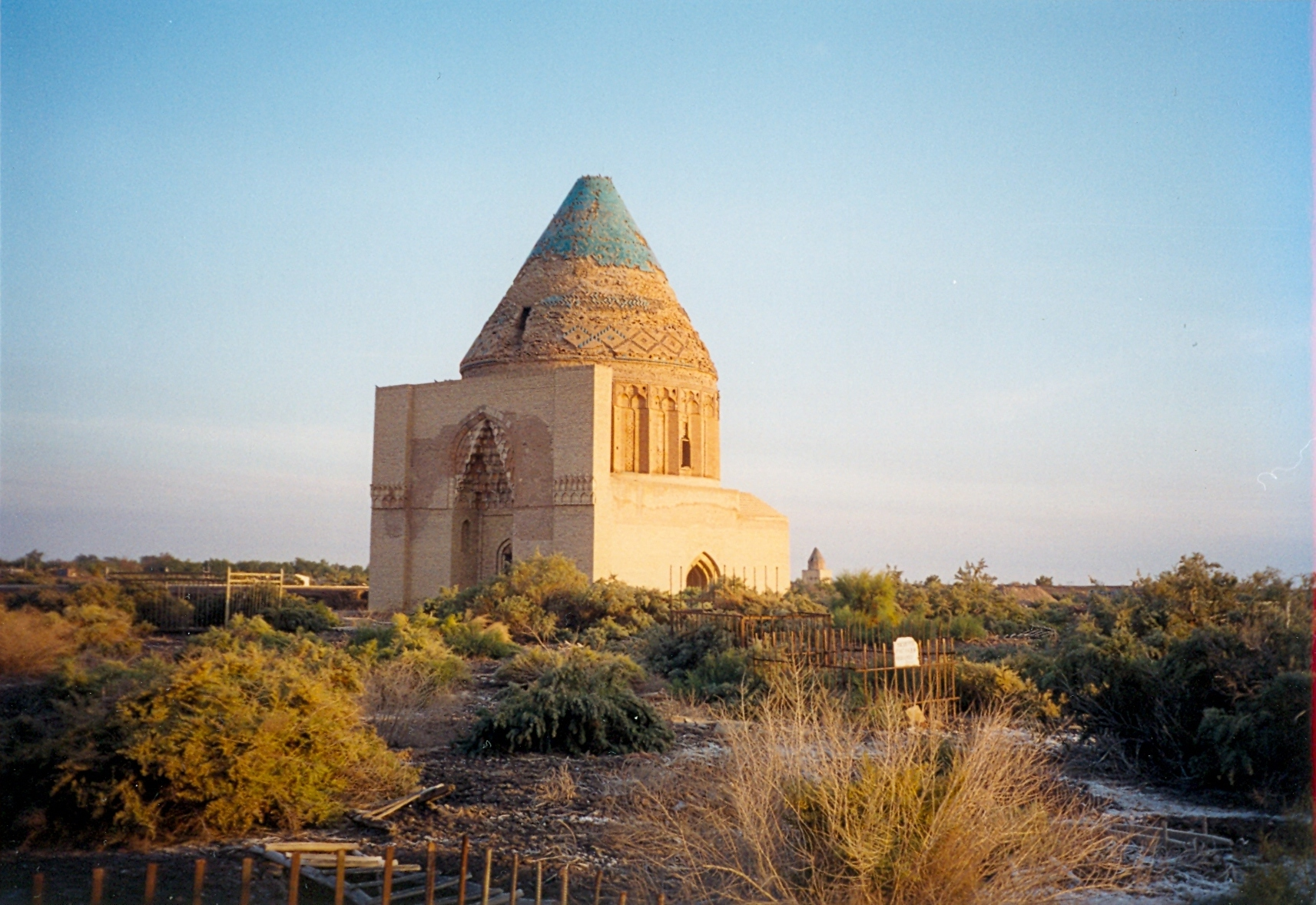
Sultan Tekesh Mausoleum, Konye-Urgench

Tourism is a small industry in Turkmenistan, serving just over 14,000 visitors in 2019. Tourist destinations include World Heritage Sites, museums, and natural sites. Many of its Central Asian cities were main points of trade on the Silk Road, linking Eastern and Western civilizations. Many neighboring countries (including Kazakhstan, Uzbekistan, and Iran) promote their countries based on their location along the Great Silk Road. Tourists from abroad are deterred by the restrictive visa policy regime with all countries of the world. Tourism is regulated by the Tourism Committee of Turkmenistan.

== Historical sites ==
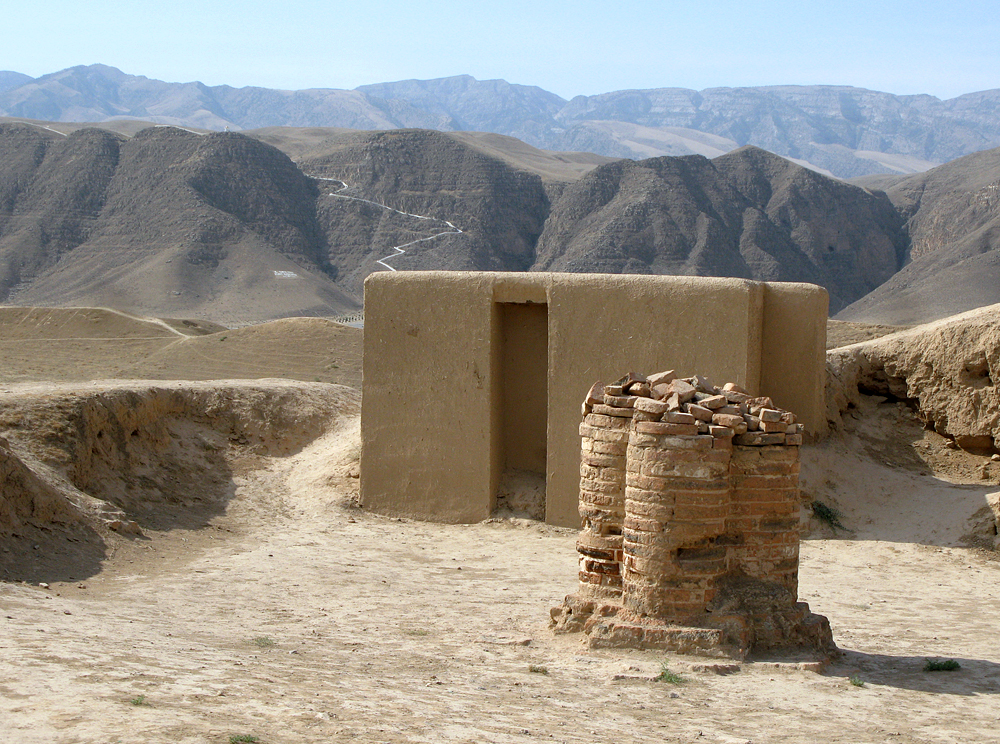
Nisa

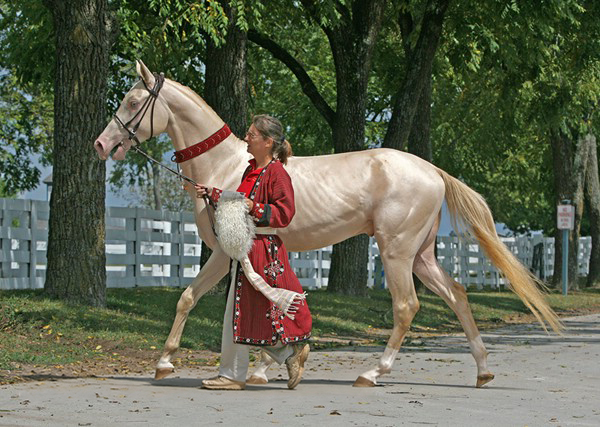
Akhal Teke

There are three World Heritage Sites in Turkmenistan. Nisa (also Parthaunisa) was an ancient city, located near modern-day Bagyr, a neighbourhood in Ashgabat 18 km southwest of downtown. Nisa is described by some as one of the first capitals of the Parthians. It is traditionally assumed to have been founded by Arsaces I (reigned c. 250 BC–211 BC), and was reputedly the royal necropolis of the Parthian kings, although it has not been established that the fortress at Nisa was either a royal residence or a mausoleum.

Merv, formerly an Achaemenid Satrapy of Margiana, and later Alexandria and Antiochia in Margiana, was a major oasis-city in Central Asia, on the historical Silk Road, located near today's Mary. Several cities have existed on this site, which is significant for the interchange of culture and politics at a site of major strategic value. It is claimed that Merv was briefly the largest city in the world in the 12th century.

Konye-Urgench is a municipality of about 30,000 inhabitants in north-eastern Turkmenistan, just south out the border with Uzbekistan. It is the site of the ancient town of Ürgenç, which contains the unexcavated ruins of the 12th-century capital of Khwarezm. Since 2005, the ruins of Old Urgench have been protected by UNESCO as a World Heritage Site. (See List of World Heritage Sites in Turkmenistan)

== Nature tourism ==
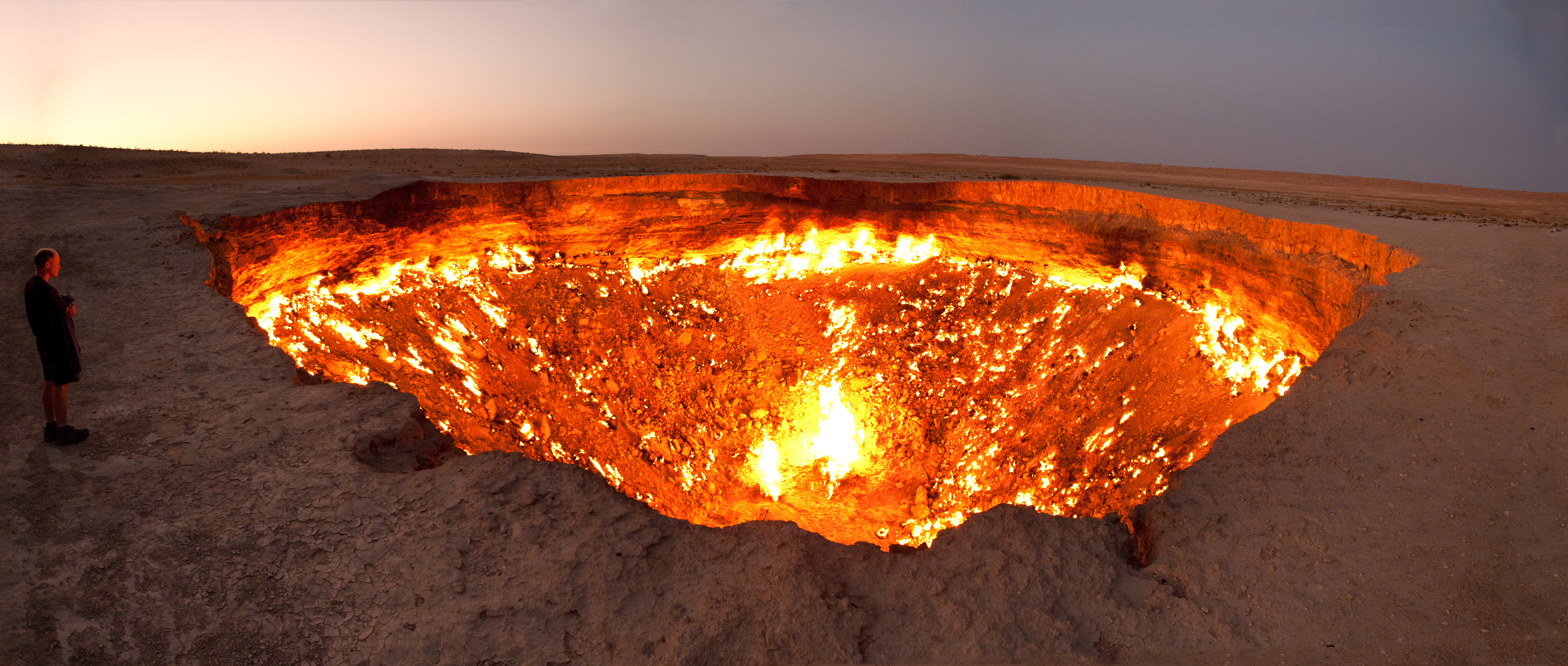
Panorama of the site of the Darvaza gas crater, 2011.

Near Derweze village in the middle of the Karakum Desert is a natural gas deposit. While drilling in 1971, Soviet geologists tapped into a cavern filled with natural gas. The ground beneath the drilling rig collapsed, creating the Darvaza gas crater, a large hole with a diameter of 70 metres (230 ft) at 40°15′10″N 58°26′22″E. To avoid poisonous gas discharge, it was decided the best solution was to burn it off. Geologists had hoped the fire would use all the fuel in a matter of days, but the gas is still burning today. Locals have dubbed the cavern the "Door to Hell".

== Museums ==
Most museums in Turkmenistan are located in the major cities of Ashgabat, Türkmenbaşy, Balkanabat, Mary and Daşoguz. Some of these include:

- Ashgabat National Museum of History
- Halk Hakydasy Memorial Complex
- Mary Museum
- The State Museum of the State Cultural Center of Turkmenistan
- Turkmen Carpet Museum
- Turkmen Museum of Fine Arts

The city of Serdar features a fine local history museum, and the city of Bereket a railroad museum.

== Visitor statistics ==
In 2016, approximately 9,000 tourists visited Turkmenistan, and in 2019, there were approximately 14,438 tourists.

In 2011, the following countries had the most tourists travel to Turkmenistan:

- Iran: 3,874
- Germany: 1,143
- United States: 531

== See also ==
- Visa policy of Turkmenistan
