= Hazar State Nature Reserve =

Protected area in Turkmenistan

Hazar Nature Reserve
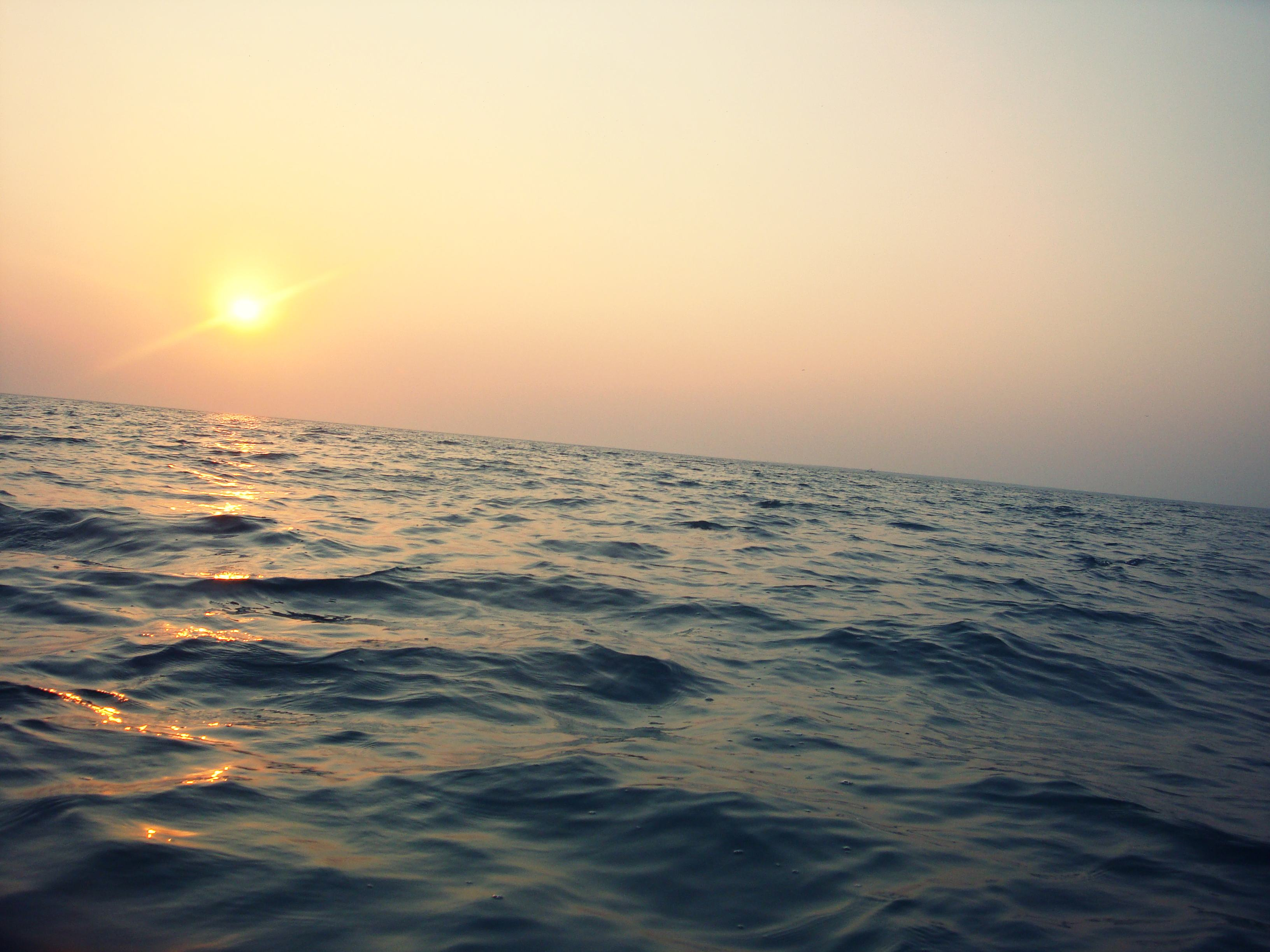
- A picture of the Caspian Sea

- Location within Caspian Sea Location within Turkmenistan
- Location: Balkan Province, Turkmenistan
- Coordinates: 39°N 53.044722°E
- Area: 2,690 km^{2} (1,040 sq mi)

Hazar Nature Reserve (Turkmen: Hazar goraghanasy) is a nature reserve (zapovednik) of Turkmenistan.

It is located on the south-east coast of the Caspian Sea, in Balkan Province and covers an area of 2,690 km^{2}. Ogurjaly Sanctuary is part of this nature reserve.

The climate is continental, the average annual temperature is 15 degrees Celsius.
