= Garlyk Sanctuary =

Sanctuary in Turkmenistan

- Location: Lebap Province, Turkmenistan
- Area: 40,000 ha (99,000 acres)
- Established: 1986

Garlyk Sanctuary is a sanctuary (zakaznik) of Turkmenistan.

It is part of Köýtendag Nature Reserve. It was established for the protection of unique caves and other objects of the inanimate nature (marble onyx), protection of rare and endemic species of plants, preservation of juniper groves.
