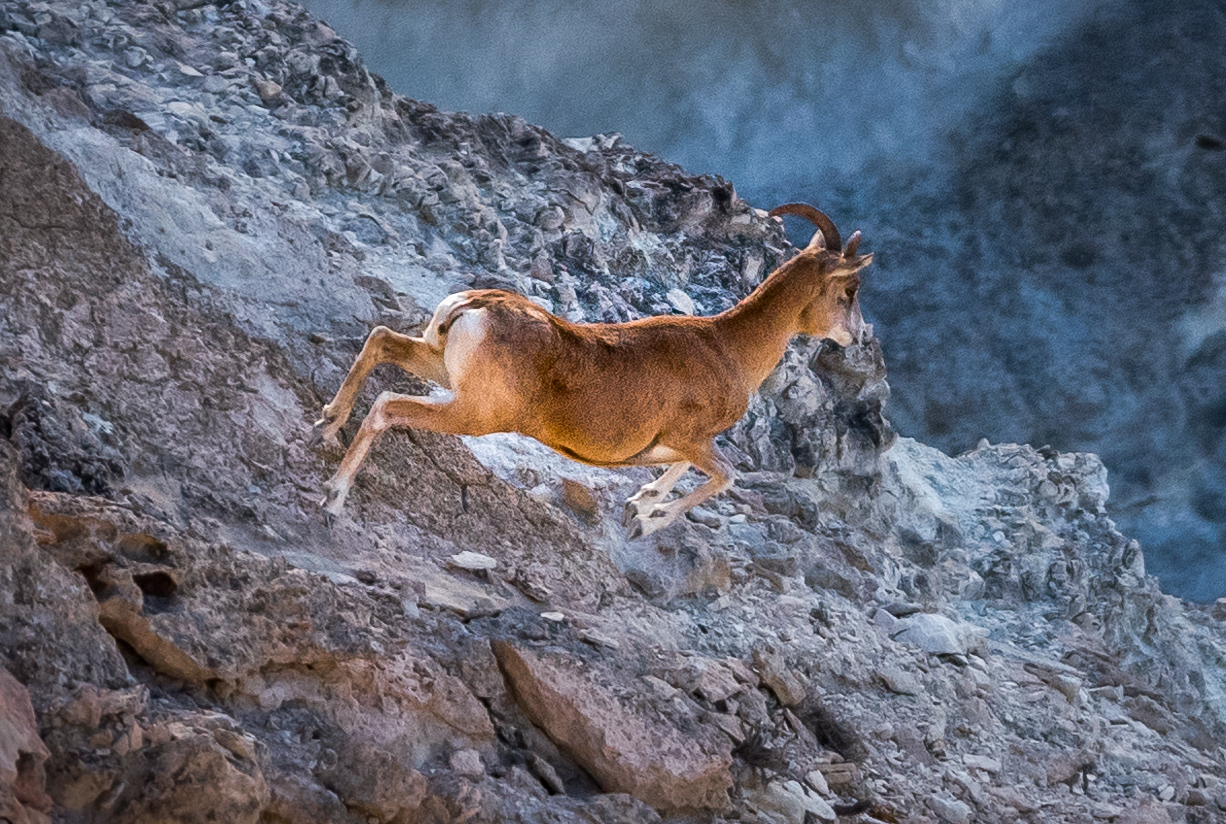
- A jumping female Ovis vignei cycloceros

Scientific classification
- Kingdom: Animalia
- Phylum: Chordata
- Class: Mammalia
- Order: Artiodactyla
- Family: Bovidae
- Subfamily: Caprinae
- Genus: Ovis
- Species: O. vignei
- Subspecies: O. v. cycloceros

Trinomial name
- Ovis vignei cycloceros Hutton, 1842

= Ustyurt Mountain sheep =

Subspecies of urial

The Ustyurt mountain sheep or Afghan urial (Ovis vignei cycloceros), often referred to as the Turkmenian mountain sheep, is a subspecies of the urial that inhabits the mountain plateau regions of parts of Central Asia, especially the Ustyurt plateau from which it takes its name. It is particularly common in northern and eastern Turkmenistan and western Kazakhstan.

The sheep are threatened by trophy hunting. The species is considered vulnerable according to the International Union for Conservation of Nature. In 2022, the Association for the Conservation of Biodiversity of Kazakhstan published a video showing evidence of a sheep in the northern part of the Ustyurt Plateau.

A number of reserves have been established in Central Asia to protect the sheep and other wildlife. The sheep are found in Gaplaňgyr Nature Reserve for instance.
