= Badhyz State Nature Reserve =

Nature reserve in Turkmenistan

Coordinates: 35.8667°N 61.6667°E

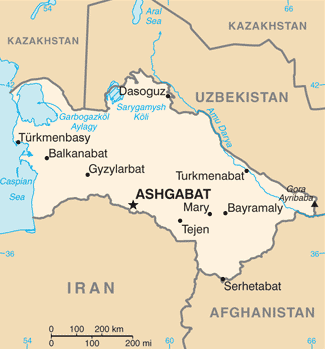
- Interactive map of Badhyz State Nature Reserve
- Location: Mary Province, Turkmenistan
- Nearest city: Tejen
- Area: 877 km^{2} (339 sq mi)
- Established: 1941

The Badhyz State Nature Reserve (Turkmen: Bathyz goraghanasy) is a protected area (zapovednik) in south-western Turkmenistan that was established in 1941 and extends over 877 km^{2} (339 sq mi) in the Mary and Akhal Provinces. It is located south of the Karakum Desert, and the Tejen River forms its western border.

Its landscape comprises solitary or groups of foothills, ranging in height from 20 to 200 m. The average annual precipitation of the reserve is about 280 mm, with a maximum of 420 mm and a minimum of 130 mm. Its short spring is followed by a long hot summer with 4–5 months of hot weather and little cooling winds.

It also incorporates three wildlife sanctuaries (zakaznik), which were established in 1956:

- Çemenebit Sanctuary
- Gyzyljar Sanctuary
- Pulhatyn Sanctuary

== Fauna ==
The Badhyz State Nature Reserve is an important stronghold of the Asiatic wild ass (Equus hemionus kulan). It was once the last place where the Turkmenian wild ass was found. The wild ass population increased from 200, when the reserve was founded to 5000 animals. After a strong decline, there are now about 650 wild ass in the sanctuary.

Other ungulates present in this protected area are urial, goitered gazelle and wild boar. Predators include red fox, Persian leopard, striped hyena, grey wolf, and Asiatic wildcat.

The Asiatic cheetah also used to occur in the nature reserve. It has not been recorded in the region since the 1960s, and dispersal of individuals from neighbouring Iran is obstructed by the fenced border between the two countries.
