= Köpetdag Nature Reserve =

Nature reserve in Turkmenistan

- IUCN category Ia (strict nature reserve)
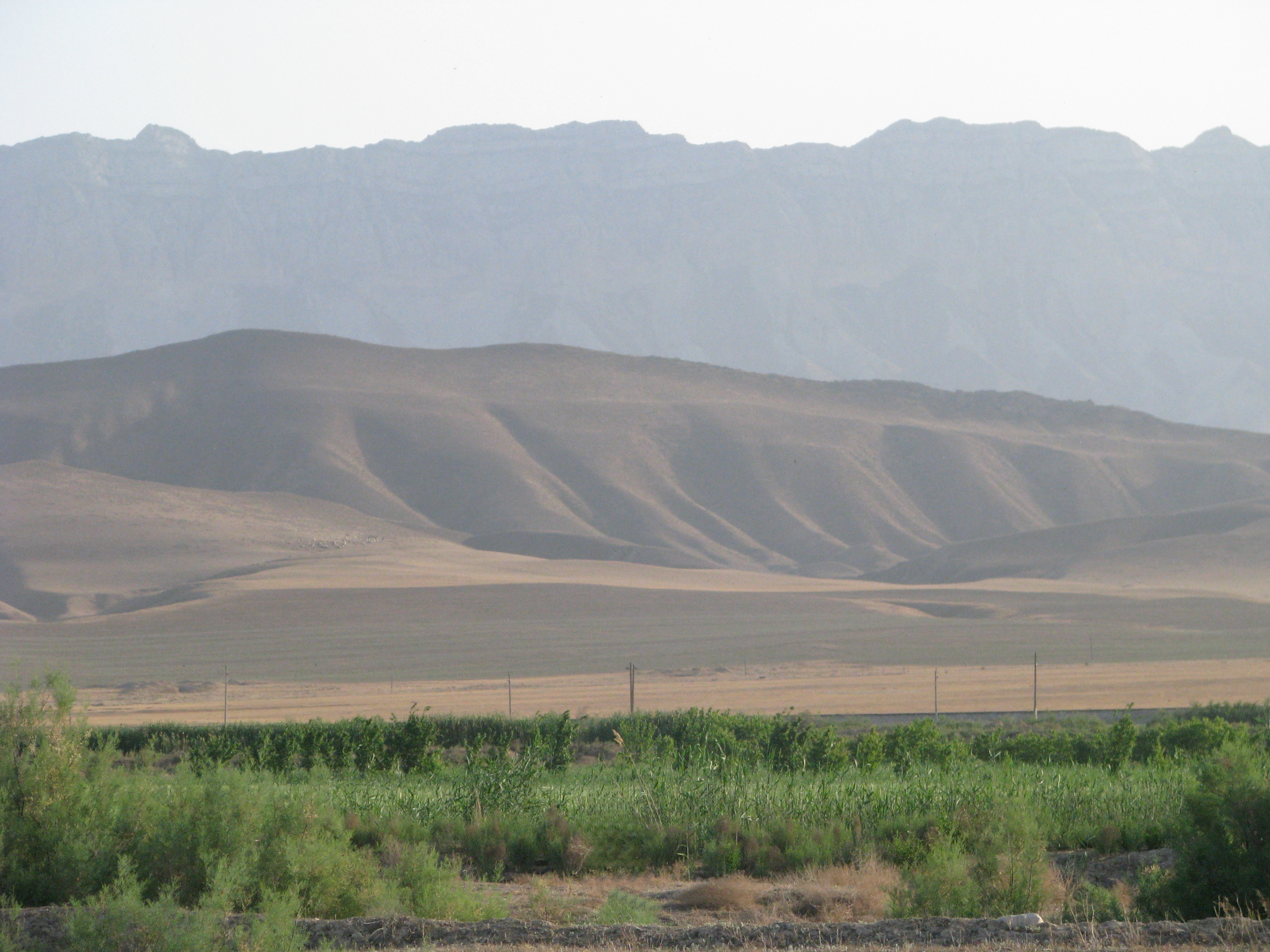

- Location within Turkmenistan
- Location: Ahal Province, Turkmenistan
- Nearest city: Asgabat
- Coordinates: 37°44′02″N 58°16′12″E
- Area: 497 km^{2} (192 mi^{2})
- Established: 1976

Köpetdag Nature Reserve is a nature reserve (zapovednik) of Turkmenistan.

Established in 1976 for the protection of indigenous flora and fauna ( juniper, wild fruit trees, reptiles, birds, and mammals) it is located in the central part of the Kopetdag Range in Ahal Province, covering an area of 497 km^{2} (192 mi^{2}). The reserve consists of four separate areas located at different altitudes, from 700 to 2800 meters.

It also incorporates two sanctuaries and two natural monuments:

- Mäne-Çäçe Sanctuary - established in 1976.
- Guryhowdan Sanctuary - established in 1976.
- Garaýalçy Natural Monument.
- Çarlyk Natural Monument.

== Flora and Fauna ==
The most critically endangered species of animals are protected here, such as leopards, wild sheep, bear goats, Indian porcupines, hyenas and other species of mammals, birds, snakes and lizards. The flora in the park is characterized by plant diversity, of which 332 are endemic. The plants that have the most rare and endangered species are Liliaceae, Orchidaceae, Rosaceae, Fabaceae and Asteraceae.
