= Bereketli Garagum Nature Reserve =

Protected area in Turkmenistan

Bereketli Garagum State Reserve
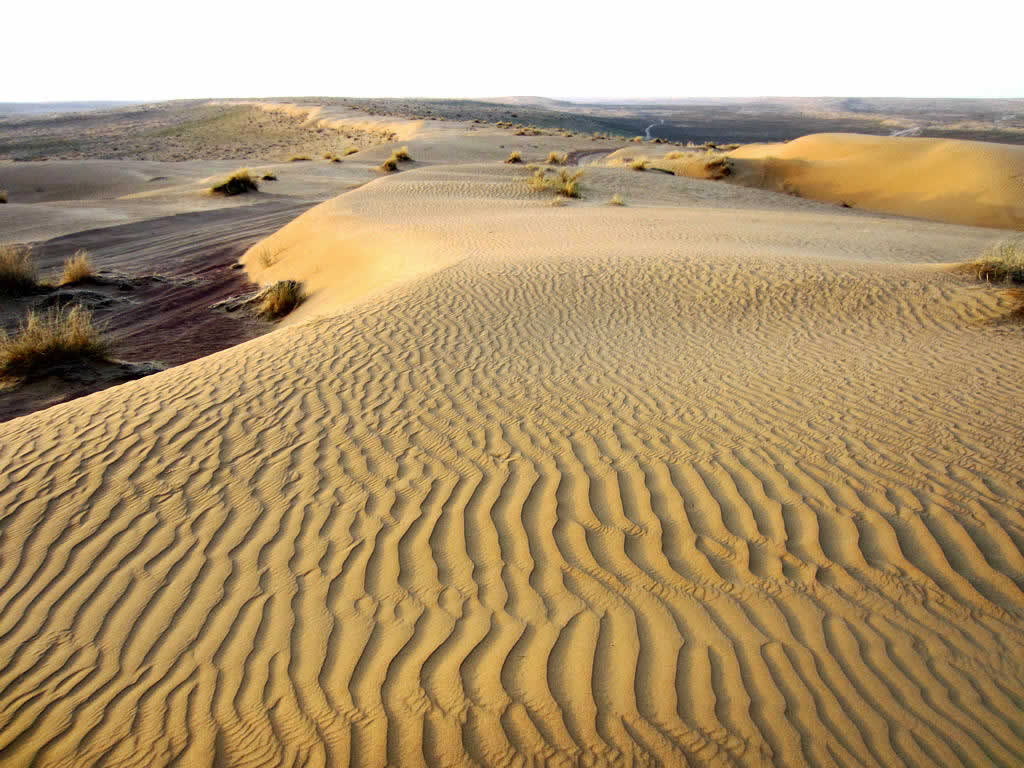

- Location within Turkmenistan
- Location: Ahal Province, Turkmenistan
- Coordinates: 38°55′N 59°00′E
- Established: 2013

UNESCO World Heritage Site
- Official name: Cold Winter Deserts of Turan
- Type: Natural
- Criteria: ix, x
- Designated: 2023 (45th session)
- Reference no.: 1693

State Natural Reserve Bereketli Garagum (Turkmen: Bereketli Garagum goraghanasy) is a desert nature reserve (zapovednik) of Turkmenistan, located in Ahal Province, south Karakum Desert. The reserve area 87,000 hectares. It was established in 2013 in order to further improve the protection and preservation of the unique ecosystems and the natural resources of the Karakum Desert. The reserve is in the long term will be recommended for inclusion in the list of UNESCO World Natural Heritage Site.

CADI (Central Asian Desert Initiative) is working on a project to justify expanding the boundaries of the reserve, to provide better living conditions for wild ungulates migrating outside the reserve to the watering hole.
