= Sünt-Hasardag Nature Reserve =

Protected area in Turkmenistan

Coordinates: 38°32′N 56°25′E

- Interactive map of Sünt-Hasardag Nature Reserve
- Location: Balkan Province, Turkmenistan
- Area: 303 km^{2} (117 sq mi)
- Established: 1977

Sünt-Hasardag Nature Reserve (Turkmen: Sünt-Hasardag goraghanasy) is a nature reserve (zapovednik) of Turkmenistan.

Established in 1977 for the protection of indigenous flora and fauna, it is located in south-western part of the Kopetdag Range in Balkan Province, covering an area of 303 km^{2}.

It also incorporates one sanctuary:

- Sünt-Hasardag Sanctuary - established in 1990.

The reserve is dominated by a dry subtropical climate, with long dry summers. The temperature in summer ranges from 35 to 45 degrees Celsius. The rainy season starts in November and lasts until April.The reserve is known as one of the centers in the world where wild relatives of cultivated crops thrive; wild relatives of figs, wild apples, walnuts, pistachios, almonds and cherries grow here. All of them represent a significant historical gene pool for crops.
