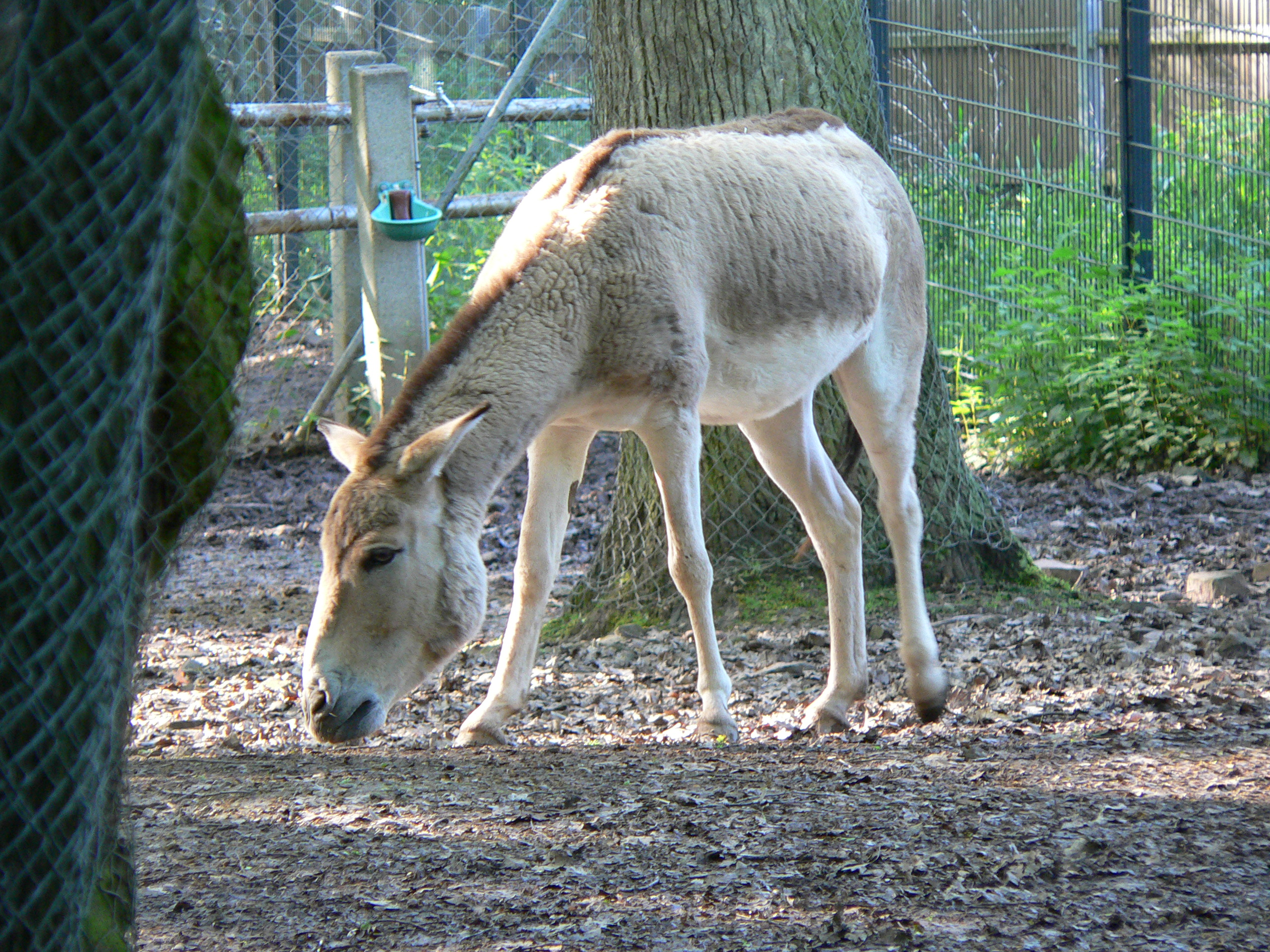
- A Turkmenian kulan at Wildpark Pforzheim.

Conservation status
- Endangered (IUCN 3.1)
- CITES Appendix II

Scientific classification
- Kingdom: Animalia
- Phylum: Chordata
- Class: Mammalia
- Order: Perissodactyla
- Family: Equidae
- Genus: Equus
- Species: E. hemionus
- Subspecies: E. h. kulan

Trinomial name
- Equus hemionus kulan Groves & Mazák, 1967

Synonyms
- Equus hemionus finschi (Matschie, 1911)

= Turkmenian kulan =

Subspecies of onager

The Turkmenian kulan (Equus hemionus kulan), also called Transcaspian wild ass, Turkmenistani onager or simply the kulan, is a subspecies of onager (Asiatic wild ass) native to Central Asia. It was declared endangered in 2016.

The species's population had recently been in decline in the country while it slowly increases in reintroduction sites. The Turkmenian kulan has been reintroduced to Kazakhstan and Uzbekistan, as well as Israel, where the subspecies are hybridizing with Persian onagers in the wild.

In 2005, the population was estimated at 1,295-1,345 in Turkmenistan. No other data existed on the condition of the Turkmenistan populations, but hope remained that small groups of animals still resided in inaccessible areas around Badkhyz, and were thriving in the West Kopetdagh (Sumbar-Chandyr Valley) and Ustyurt Plateau around Lake Sarakamish. However, certain fragmented populations of Transcaspian wild ass are currently on the rise to even more than 2,000 individuals in the wild. It is also estimated that over 6,000 kulans live in Central Asia. In 2017, there were 3,900 kulans in total roaming in Kazakhstan, of which the largest Kazakh population (3,400) resided in Altyn-Emel National Park. From 2017 onward, kulan translocated from Altyn-Emel were reintroduced to a new site in the Torgai steppe of Central Kazakhstan under the Altyn Dala Conservation Initiative. In October 2024, 24 kulan were moved to the Altyn Dala Nature Reserve in the Kostanai Region from Altyn-Emel—reported by then to hold 3,965 animals and to remain Kazakhstan's largest wild population—and the first two wild-born foals were recorded in Central Kazakhstan that year.

== Physical description ==
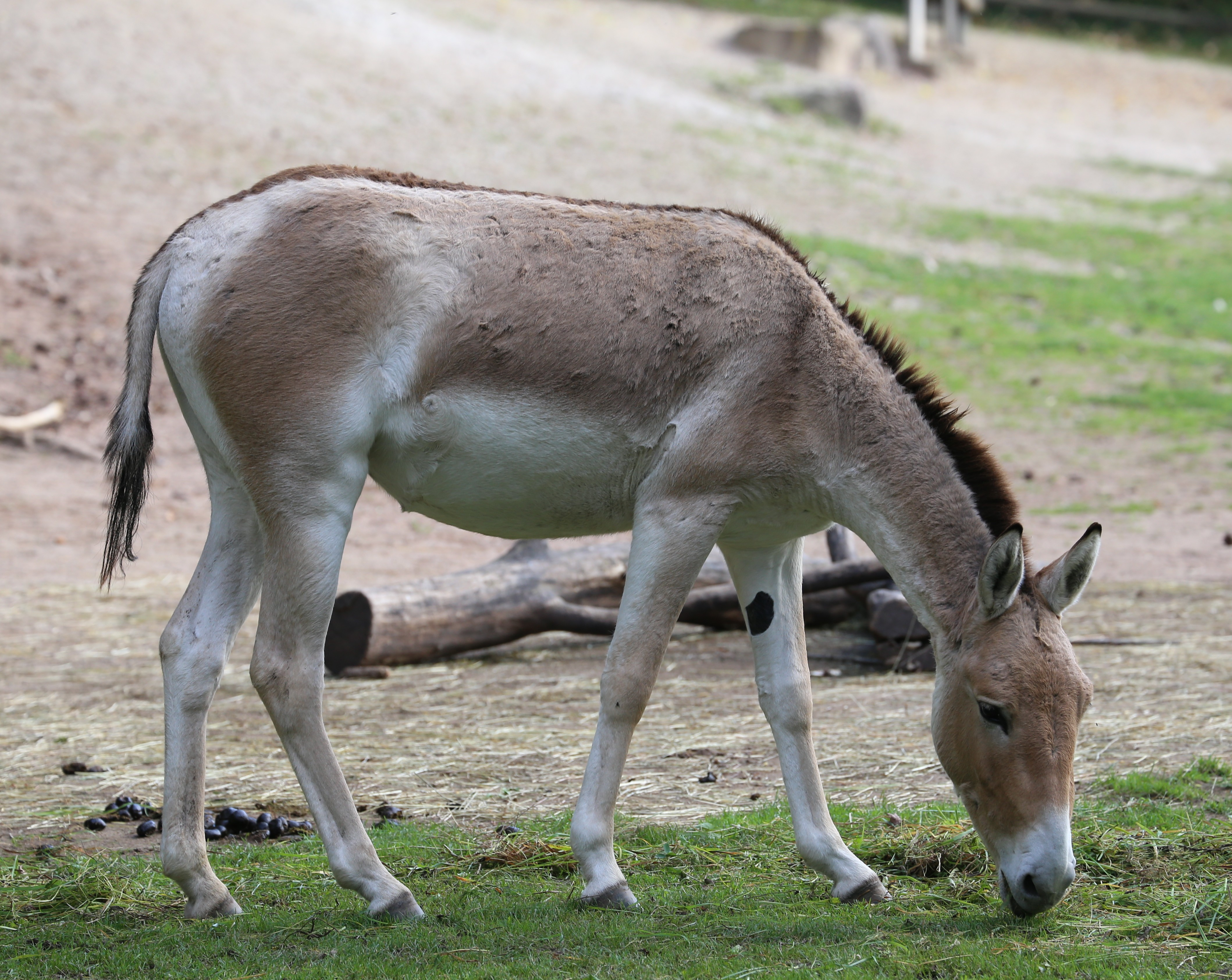
A Turkmenian kulan at Nuremberg Zoo.

The Turkmenian kulan is one of the largest subspecies of the onagers. It is 200–250 cm long, 100–140 cm tall at the shoulder, and it weighs 200–240 kg. Male onagers are larger than the females.

The Transcaspian wild ass is characterized by a pale brown coat, a dark stripe down the spine and white patches on the sides, back and belly. It also has shaggy black mane and a tuft at the tail end. During the summer, the Turkmenian kulan's coat is leaner and brown, then it turns into thick grayish-brown winter coat during the cold season.

== Evolution ==
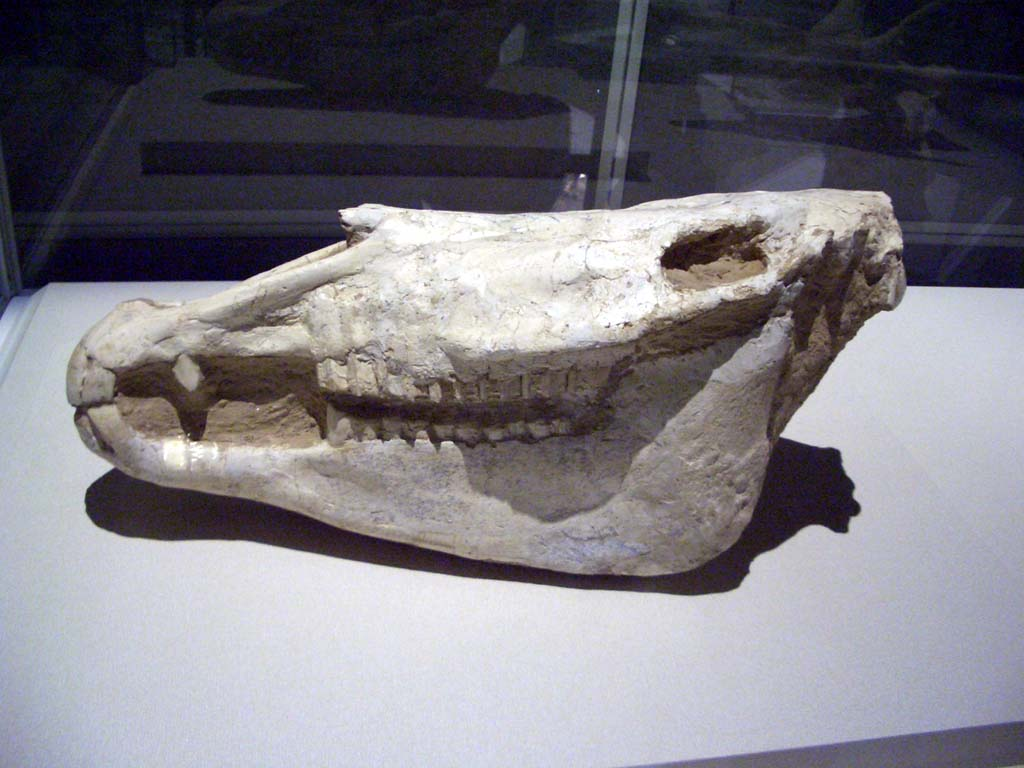
Skull of a giant extinct horse, Equus eisenmannae

The genus Equus, which includes all extant equines, is believed to have evolved from Dinohippus via the intermediate form Plesippus. One of the oldest species is Equus simplicidens, described as zebra-like with a donkey-shaped head. The oldest fossil to date is ~3.5 million years old from Idaho, USA. The genus appears to have spread quickly into the Old World, with the similarly aged Equus livenzovensis documented from western Europe and Russia.

Molecular phylogenies indicate the most recent common ancestor of all modern equids (members of the genus Equus) lived ~5.6 (3.9–7.8) mya. Direct paleogenomic sequencing of a 700,000-year-old middle Pleistocene horse metapodial bone from Canada implies a more recent 4.07 Myr before present date for the most recent common ancestor (MRCA) within the range of 4.0 to 4.5 Myr BP. The oldest divergencies are the Asian hemiones (subgenus E. (Asinus), including the kulan, onager, and kiang), followed by the African zebras (subgenera E. (Dolichohippus), and E. (Hippotigris)). All other modern forms including the domesticated horse (and many fossil Pliocene and Pleistocene forms) belong to the subgenus E. (Equus) which diverged ~4.8 (3.2–6.5) million years ago.

== Habitat and range ==
The Turkmenian kulan lives in Central Asian deltas, hot and cold deserts or semi-deserts, steppes, arid grasslands and shrublands.

The Turkmen specimen used to be the most widespread of the onagers, ranging from northernmost Iran and northern Afghanistan, the Transcaspian Oblast and western China to Ukraine and southern Siberia. It used to live in Saryesik-Atyrau Desert of Kazakhstan. However, it has gone extinct from that location.

== Diet and behavior ==
The Turkmenian kulan are herbivorous mammals. They feed on herbs, shrubbery and plants. Most of their liquid comes from food, although they often travel to water sources, especially when breast-feeding their offspring.

The mare lives with foals in small herds. The dominant stallion defends the surrounding areas to the water sources and tries to mate with any females that come close to drink. The mare, after a gestation period of about a year, gives birth to a single foal that stays with her mother for the first two years of life.

The scorching heat of the Central Asian deserts makes the Transcaspian wild ass mostly active at dawn and dusk when temperatures are milder. The kulans, like most onagers, are one of the fastest land mammals and can run at high speed of 70 km/h.

== Threats ==
Like all onagers, the Turkmenian kulan is threatened by poaching, hunting for their meat and their coat, habitat loss and relationships with apex predators such as Persian leopards, striped hyenas and mostly Himalayan wolves. Extinct predators like the Caspian tiger also preyed on the kulan. However, like other onagers, they have anti-predatory protections. Group of stallions can cooperate and chase off the predators.

== Conservation ==
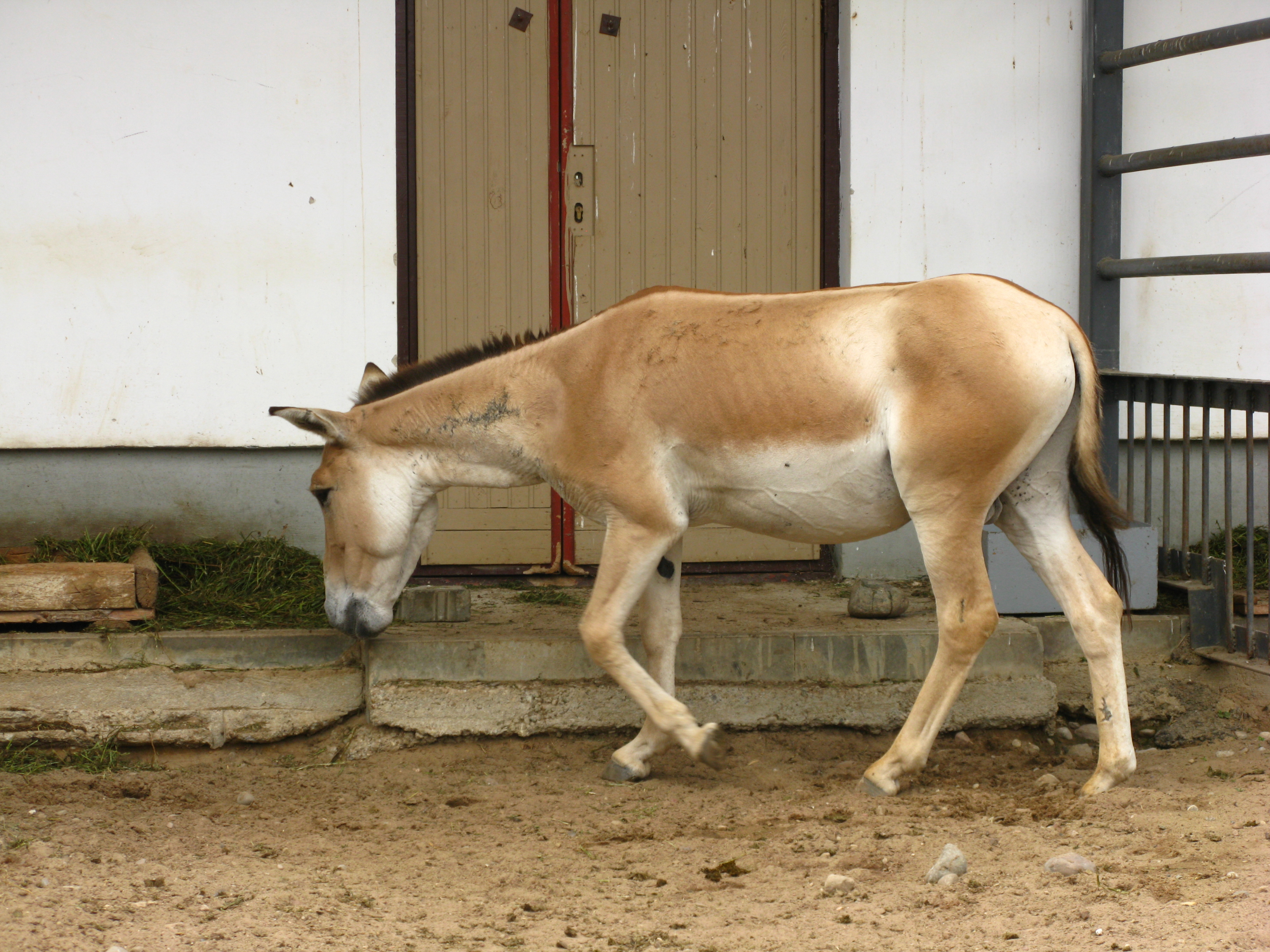
A Turkmenian kulan at Grodno Zoo, Belarus.

In early 1919, the Soviet Union placed the Turkmenian kulan under protection. However, the measures enacted in their favor have not saved them from local extinctions, such as in Kazakhstan, where the subspecies disappeared in 1935. The main kulan population has suffered a dramatic decline in recent years. Badkhyz was the main stronghold and the last habitat of the Transcaspian wild ass which contained a few thousands of individuals, until it was reintroduced in other protected areas in Turkmenistan and other Central Asian countries that was built purposely for the kulans, such as the Gaplaňgyr Nature Reserve, the Çemenebit Sanctuary and the Mäne-Çäçe Sanctuary.

As of 1996-1997 the total population of Turkmenian kulan were estimated at between 500 and 700 kulans in Kazakhstan and about 6,000 kulans in Turkmenistan. Of the latter about 5,000 to 6,000 lived in Badkhyz Zapovednik alone and about 1,000 in artificially restored populations elsewhere in Turkmenistan. In Badkhyz, the Turkmenian kulan population has decreased from 6,000 individuals as of 1993 to 2,400 in 1998 and to 650 in 2002. Currently, there are 900 kulans in Badkhyz. Previously in 2005, there were more than 1,300 Turkmenian kulans in Turkmenistan (850-900 in Badhyz State Nature Reserve and another 445 in seven different reintroduction sites).

=== Reintroduction projects ===
After their local extinction in Kazakhstan in the 1930s, the kulan was reintroduced in four localities of Kazakhstan (where live about 900 specimens), and in Uzbekistan afterwards (34 specimens).

The first reintroduction site of Turkmenian kulans in Kazakhstan was the Barsa-Kelmes Nature Reserve. Another 35 were reintroduced to the Aktau-Buzachinsky Sanctuary in 1991, which have grown to a population of more than 100 individuals on the Mangishlak Peninsula. Between 1986 and 1990, 105 Turmenian kulans were reintroduced to the Andasai Sanctuary, and have since increased to 200.

In 1984, 32 kulans were reintroduced to the Kapchagai Game Area, which subsequently became the Altyn-Emel National Park (over 50,000,000 hectares in area), from southeastern Kazakhstan which consists of desert, between the Ili River and the Ak-Tau mountain range, near Lake Kapchagai. The previous census revealed that more than 700 individuals lived at Altyn-Emel. The population of Turkmenian kulan are on the rise, as that said small populations of Turkmenian kulan at Altyn-Emel increased to 2,000 as of 2012. The population has further increased to 3,400 kulans in Altyn-Emel as of 2017.

In Kazakhstan, BirdLife partner, the ACBK (Association for the Conservation of Biodiversity of Kazakhstan) has recently started work on a project to establish a new kulan population in Central Asian steppe. On 24 October 2017, nine kulans were taken from Altyn-Emel and released to Altyn Dala protected area of the central Kazakh steppes. The reintroduction project aims to further move 30 or 40 kulans from Altyn Emel to the central steppes during the next 3 or 4 years. They are also released in Irgiz-Turgai.

The Turkmenian kulans, along with the Przewalski's horse, have been reintroduced to the Askania-Nova Biosphere Reserve in southern Ukraine. In 2020, a herd of 20 kulans sourced from the Askania-Nova Biosphere Reserve were reintroduced to the Tarutyns'kyj steppe in southwestern Ukraine. A July 2023 Wired story reported that at least two kulan foals had been born at Tarutino Steppe preserve, and despite the disruptions caused by nearby military activity, the herd has adapted well.

=== In captivity ===
The Turkmenian kulans are breeding in captivity in zoos, breeding centers and wildlife parks part of the American (SSP, AZA) and Eurasian (EEP, EAZA) captive breeding programs. There are over 1,000 Turkmenian kulans registered in the international studbook of the World Association of Zoos and Aquariums (WAZA).

== Related subspecies ==
- Mongolian wild ass (khulan), Equus hemionus hemionus
- Persian onager (gur), Equus hemionus onager
- Indian wild ass (khur), Equus hemionus khur
- Syrian wild ass or hemippe, Equus hemionus hemippus (extinct)
