= Gaplaňgyr Nature Reserve =

Nature reserve in Turkmenistan

- Interactive map of Gaplaňgyr Nature Reserve
- Location: Daşoguz Province, Turkmenistan
- Area: 2,822 km^{2} (1,090 sq mi)
- Established: 1979

UNESCO World Heritage Site
- Official name: Cold Winter Deserts of Turan
- Type: Natural
- Criteria: ix, x
- Designated: 2023 (45th session)
- Reference no.: 1693

Gaplaňgyr or Kaplankyr is a mountain plateau and nature reserve (zapovednik) of northern Turkmenistan. It was established in 1979.

It is a place for the protection and restoration of indigenous flora and fauna, it is located on the Gaplaňgyr Plateau at the southern spur of the Ustyurt Plateau at the border with Kazakhstan and Uzbekistan in the north-west of Daşoguz Province. It covers an area of 2822 km².

== Fauna and flora ==
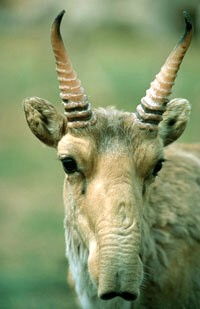
Saiga antelope

Twenty-six species of mammals, 147 species of birds, and 918 species of higher plants have been recorded in Kaplankyr reserve. Protected rare species of animals found in the reserve include, Central Asian gazelle, the Ustyurt Mountain sheep, honey badger as well as substantial population of the Saiga antelope that migrate here from Karakalpakstan in the winter. Plants include the Khiva thistle, Turkmen tulip, Antonia's gypsophila, Karelin sand acacia, and 55 other endemic species. The Gaplaňgyr Nature Reserve also incorporates two sanctuaries: Sarygamyş Sanctuary, which was established in 1980 as a lake-coastal ecosystems, and Şasenem Sanctuary, which was established in 1984 for the preservation of stony desert and the Turkmenian kulan.
