= Repetek Biosphere State Reserve =

Biosphere reserve in Turkmenistan

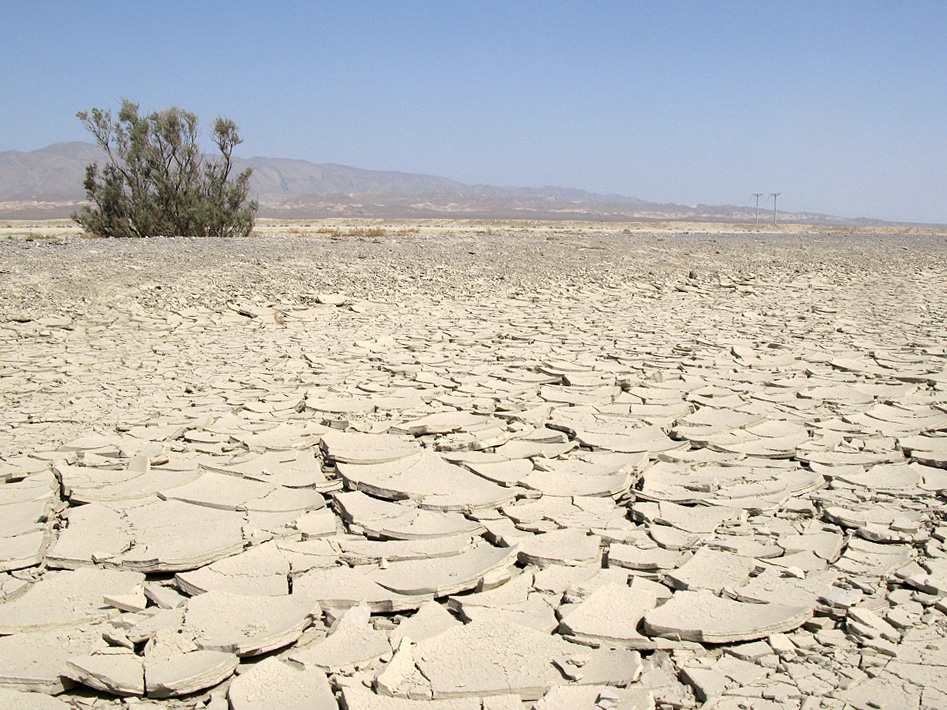

- Location within Turkmenistan
- Location: Lebap Province, Turkmenistan
- Nearest city: Türkmenabat
- Coordinates: 38°36′22″N 63°12′50″E
- Area: 346 km^{2} (134 mi^{2})
- Established: 1928

UNESCO World Heritage Site
- Official name: Cold Winter Deserts of Turan
- Type: Natural
- Criteria: ix, x
- Designated: 2023 (45th session)
- Reference no.: 1693

Repetek Biosphere State Reserve, often referred to as Repetek Nature or Desert Reserve, (Turkmen: Repetek goraghanasy, Репетек горагханасы) is a desert nature reserve (zapovednik) of Turkmenistan, located in Lebap Province, East Karakum Desert, near Amu Darya. It is located approximately 70 km (43 mi) south from Türkmenabat and is known for its zemzen (desert monitor which is Varanus griseus). Established in 1928 for the study and preservation of a sand-desert ecosystem, it covers an area of 346 km^{2} (134 mi^{2}).

== Geography ==
The landscape of the reserve is arid, with extensive ridged sand dunes some 15–20 m (49–66 ft) in height and 8–10 m (26–33 ft) in length in many areas, large areas of sand dune and valley-like depressions. Black saxaul (Haloxylon aphyllum), rare to most part of Central Asia covers more than 1,470 km^{2} (570 mi^{2}), approximately 4.5% of the territory of the reserve. The soils have sandy subsoils, but some "21 trees, 104 grasses, 8 mushrooms, 1 moss, 68 soil algae and 197 fungi" grow within the reserve.

== History ==
The Repetek sandy desert scientific station was organized in 1912 by the decision of the Russian Geographical Society, and the reserve was established in 1928 on the base of the scientific station. During the Soviet period the reserve belonged to the Institute of Deserts of the Turkmen SSR Academy of Sciences. The list of scientific publications concerning the Repetek sandy desert station and the biosphere reserve since 1982 to 1991 consists of about 250 papers (30% on landscape structure and geography, 20% on botany and 50% on zoology).

The Institute of Deserts, Flora and Fauna of the Academy of Sciences of Turkmenistan was established in 1962 to study ways of reclaiming desert land for economic use in the reserve. A museum is present at the site.

== Environmental protection ==
The Repetek Biosphere State Reserve is part of an Important Bird Area (IBA) and since 1979 has been an under the monitoring of UNESCO but "the site is under the administration of the Ministry of Nature Protection of Turkmenistan". The reserve "supports the most complete assemblage of bird species typical of the sand desert of the Karakum" and "has an important population of Goitered Gazelle (Gazella subgutturosa) which is listed as Vulnerable (VU) in the IUCN Red List".

== Climate ==
Repetek Biosphere State Reserve has a desert climate (Köppen climate classification BWk), with cool winters and very hot summers. Rainfall is generally light and erratic, and occurs mainly in the winter and autumn months. On 28 July 1983, Repetek Biosphere State Reserve recorded a temperature of 50.1 °C (122.2 °F), which is the highest temperature to have ever been recorded in Turkmenistan and the former Soviet Union, and higher than the record high temperatures ever recorded for Europe or South America.

Climate data for Repetek Biosphere State Reserve
Month	Jan	Feb	Mar	Apr	May	Jun	Jul	Aug	Sep	Oct	Nov	Dec	Year
Record high °C (°F)	31 (88)	35 (95)	39 (102)	42 (108)	43 (109)	48 (118)	50 (122)	49 (121)	47 (116)	42 (107)	41 (106)	31 (88)	50 (122)
Mean daily maximum °C (°F)	7.3 (45.1)	10.5 (50.9)	17.4 (63.3)	25.6 (78.1)	32.3 (90.1)	37.8 (100.0)	39.8 (103.6)	37.5 (99.5)	32.1 (89.8)	23.8 (74.8)	16.6 (61.9)	9.8 (49.6)	24.2 (75.6)
Daily mean °C (°F)	1.5 (34.7)	4.1 (39.4)	10.3 (50.5)	18.1 (64.6)	24.3 (75.7)	29.5 (85.1)	31.8 (89.2)	29.0 (84.2)	22.4 (72.3)	14.6 (58.3)	8.6 (47.5)	3.7 (38.7)	16.5 (61.7)
Mean daily minimum °C (°F)	−3.0 (26.6)	−1.1 (30.0)	4.3 (39.7)	10.9 (51.6)	14.9 (58.8)	18.3 (64.9)	21.3 (70.3)	18.2 (64.8)	11.4 (52.5)	5.7 (42.3)	1.9 (35.4)	−1.0 (30.2)	8.5 (47.3)
Average precipitation mm (inches)	19 (0.7)	14 (0.6)	27 (1.1)	20 (0.8)	9 (0.4)	1 (0.0)	0.2 (0.01)	0.2 (0.01)	0.4 (0.02)	5 (0.2)	10 (0.4)	17 (0.7)	122.8 (4.94)
Average precipitation days (≥ 1.0 mm)	7	6	6	6	4	1	0	0	0	2	4	6	42
Average relative humidity (%)	69	63	54	47	33	24	23	24	31	43	57	69	45
Mean monthly sunshine hours	136.9	151.7	197.7	235.8	321.6	376.8	390.2	372.1	319.1	267.3	195.2	131.8	3,096.2
Source: NOAA (1961-1990)
