= Köýtendag Nature Reserve =

Nature reserve in Turkmenistan

- Interactive map of Köýtendag Nature Reserve
- Location: Köýtendag District Lebap Province, Turkmenistan
- Coordinates: 37°42′21″N 66°27′54″E
- Area: 271.4 km^{2} (104.8 sq mi)
- Established: 1986

Köýtendag Nature Reserve (Turkmen: Köýtendag goraghanasy), formerly Kugitang Nature Reserve, is a nature reserve (zapovednik) in the extreme east of Turkmenistan.

== Geography ==
Established in 1986, it is located in the Köýtendag Range of Lebap Province and covers an area of 271.4 km^{2}. It spreads in the middle and upper mountain belt at an altitude of 900–3139 meters above sea level. The main feature of Koytendag are cave complexes (more than 300 caves) that are unique in Eurasia and the diversity of geological processes that formed them and the beauty of geological phenomena.

The highest peak of Turkmenistan—Aýrybaba—falls in this nature reserve.

== Sanctuaries ==
It also incorporates four sanctuaries:

- Garlyk Sanctuary - established in 1986.
- Hojapil Sanctuary - established in 1986.
- Hojaburjybelent Sanctuary - established in 1986.
- Hojagarawul Sanctuary - established in 1999.

== Flora and Fauna ==
This place is one of the 50 important areas for birds and biodiversity in Turkmenistan. The reserve is home for the rare Heptner's markhor (Capra falconeri heptneri).
