= Zakaznik =

Type of protected area in former Soviet countries

A zakaznik (Note: Russian: заказник(и), romanized: zakaznik(i), IPA: [zɐˈkaznʲɪk(ʲɪ)]; Ukrainian: заказник(и), romanized: zakaznyk(y), IPA: [zɐˈkɑznɪk(ɪ)]; Belarusian: заказнік(і), romanized: zakaznik(i), IPA: [zaˈkaznʲik(ʲi)]) is a type of protected area in former Soviet republics such as Belarus, Russia, Ukraine, that meets World Conservation Union's (IUCN) category IV, or more frequently category VI criteria.

Many zakazniks have traditionally been managed as game reserves. Some protect complex ecosystems, colonies of birds, or populations of rare plants. They range in size from 0.5 ha to 6,000,000 ha. In other words, a zakaznik is a nature reserve.

Zakazniks are the areas where temporary or permanent limitations are placed upon certain on-site economic activities, such as logging, mining, grazing, hunting, etc. They correspond to sanctuary in UNESCO World Heritage terminology and literally mean preserves or reserve (from the Russian zakaz — order, reserve).

== See also ==
- Zapovednik
- List of national parks of Russia
- List of national parks of Ukraine
- List of national parks of Ukraine in the German Wikipedia and in the Ukrainian and Russian Wikipedias.
