= Visa requirements for Turkmenistani citizens =

Entry restrictions by the authorities of other states placed on citizens of Turkmenistan

A Turkmen passport

As of 2026, Turkmen citizens had visa-free or visa on arrival access to 45 countries and territories, ranking the Turkmen passport 87th in terms of travel freedom according to the Henley Passport Index.

== Visa requirements map ==
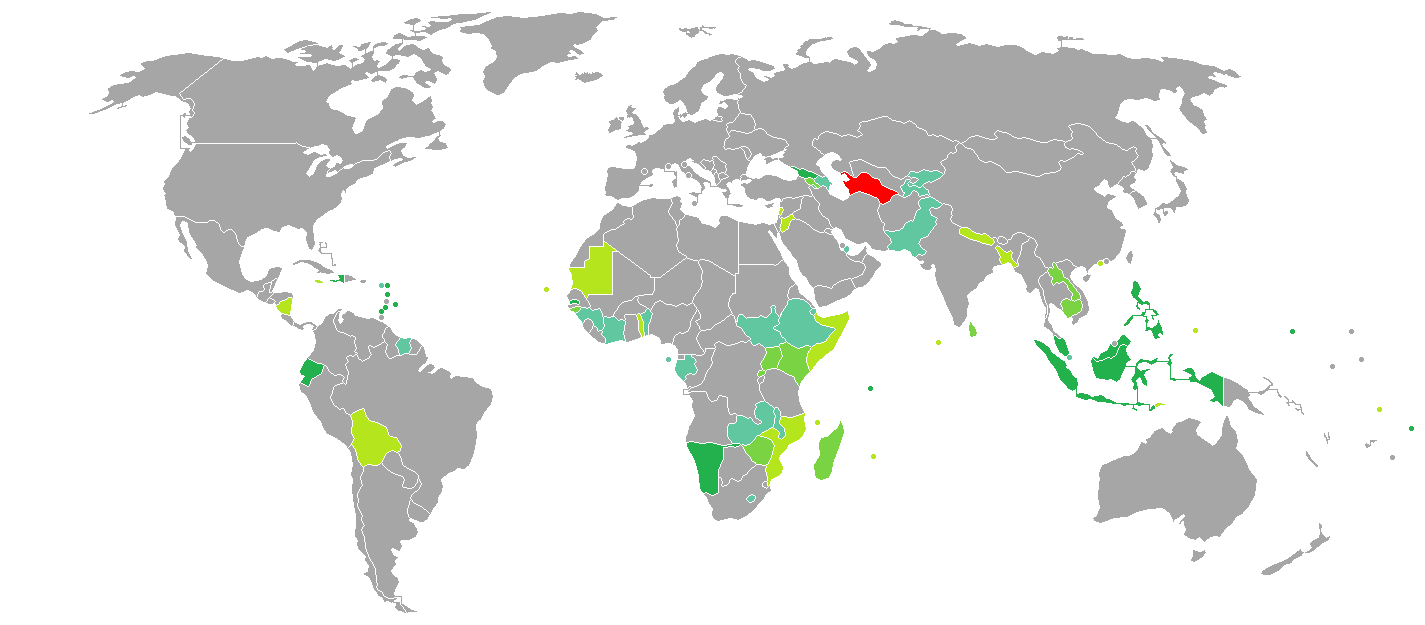
Visa requirements for Turkmen citizens Turkmenistan Visa free access Visa on arrival eVisa Visa available both on arrival or online Visa required

== Changes ==
Visa requirements for Turkmen citizens were lifted by Micronesia (18 December 1980), Philippines (15 April 2014), Georgia (June 2015), Armenia (10 July 2018).

Visas on arrival were introduced by Zimbabwe (August 2024), Guinea-Bissau (April 2012), Mozambique (February 2017), Rwanda (1 January 2018) and Namibia (1 April 2025).

Following countries have reinstated visa requirements for Turkmen citizens: Estonia (1 July 1992), Latvia (1993), Lithuania (1 November 1993), Slovakia (6 May 1994), Bulgaria (1 January 1999), Armenia (1999), Moldova (9 June 1999), Russia (17 July 1999), Hungary (1 December 1999), Romania (1 July 2000), Belarus (21 July 2000), Czech Republic (22 October 2000), Poland (3 November 2000), Kazakhstan (1 March 2001). Also Kyrgyzstan, Tajikistan, Turkey (14 September 2022), Ukraine and Uzbekistan.

Turkmen citizens were made eligible for eVisas by Singapore (December 2009), Sri Lanka (January 2012), Montserrat (September 2012), São Tomé and Príncipe (2012), Australia (Electronic Visitor visa from 1 October 2015), Anguilla (January 2021), Gabon (12 October 2017), Uganda (1 July 2016). Lesotho (1 May 2017), Saint Helena (2018), Djibouti (18 February 2018), Benin (15 March 2018), Equatorial Guinea (July 2023), Kenya (1 January 2024), Guinea (October 2019), Sierra Leone (September 2019) Malawi (November 2019), South Sudan (29 September 2020), Azerbaijan (December 2019), Papua New Guinea (17 June 2019), Pakistan (July 2024), Thailand (October 2024), Russia (December 2024), Mauritania (5 January 2025), Belarus (From 11 January 2025 Belarus recognizes eVisas issued by Russia), Namibia (1 April 2025), Botswana (May 2025), Nicaragua (March 2026) and Ghana (26 May 2026).

== Visa requirements ==
Country	Visa requirement	Allowed stay	Notes (excluding departure fees)
Afghanistan	Visa required		Not eligible for the e-Visa program available to most nationalities.
Albania	eVisa		Visa is not required for Holders of a valid multiple-entry Schengen, UK or US visa has been previously used once or residence permit of Ireland, Schengen, UK, US or UAE 10 years.
Algeria	Visa required		
Andorra	Visa required		Although officially no visa is required, at least a Double Entry Schengen visa is required to enter Andorra since it has no own airport facility.; Although no visa requirements exist, apply the relevant regulations of France or Spain, whichever must be transited to reach Andorra.
Angola	eVisa		
Antigua and Barbuda	Visa not required	30 days	
Argentina	Visa required		
Armenia	eVisa	180 days within 1 year	Turkmenistani citizens May get a Visa on arrival if they provide a valid residence permit issued by the USA, European Union Member States, Schengen Area States, UAE, Bahrain, Qatar, Saudi Arabia, Kuwait, Oman, and whose residence permit is valid for at least six months from the date of entry into the Armenia, are exempt from the visa requirement starting from July 1, 2026 to July 1, 2027.
Australia and territories	Visa required		May apply online (Online Visitor e600 visa).
Austria	Visa required		
Azerbaijan	eVisa	30 days	The standard e-Visa is issued within 3 business days. The e-Visa for Azerbaijan is valid for a period of 90 days, allowing a single entry for a stay of up to 30 days in the country. The categories of travel authorized with e-Visa include tourism, business, science, education, work, culture, sports, humanitarian activities, medical treatment, personal trips, and official trips.
Bahamas	eVisa		
Bahrain	eVisa		Turkmenistan citizens may obtain a visa on arrival or an e-Visa before traveling. Required copy of a valid visit visa to UAE, United Kingdom, USA, Saudi Arabia (excluding Hajj & Umrah visa), Schengen or USA Green Card.
Bangladesh	Visa on arrival	30 days	
Barbados	Visa not required	28 days	
Belarus	Visa required		Belarus recognizes visas issued by Russia.
Belgium	Visa required		
Belize	Visa required		
Benin	eVisa	30 days	Must have an international vaccination certificate.; Free 72-hour visa for cruise passengers.
Bhutan	eVisa	90 days	Citizens of Turkmenistan may independently obtain an e-Visa whose duration of stay is 90 days. Visa fee is 40 USD per person (nonrefundable). Visa application may be processed within 5 business days.
Bolivia	Visa on arrival	90 days	
Bosnia and Herzegovina	Visa required		
Botswana	eVisa	3 months	
Brazil	Visa required		
Brunei	Visa required		
Bulgaria	Visa required		
Burkina Faso	eVisa		
Burundi	Visa on arrival	30 days	
Cambodia	eVisa / Visa on arrival	30 days	
Cameroon	eVisa		
Canada	Visa required		US permanent resident card (Green card) holders can enter visa free
Cape Verde	Visa required		
Central African Republic	Visa required		
Chad	Visa required		
Chile	Visa required		
China	Visa required		For holders of ordinary Turkmenistan passports visa not required for 30 days for travelling as part of an tour group organized by authorized travel agencies of Turkmenistan or China.; As of June 30, 2025, the Chinese Embassy in Turkmenistan has launched an online application system for Chinese visas. Applicants can complete visa forms and upload the required documents online.
Colombia	eVisa		
Comoros	Visa on arrival	45 days	
Republic of the Congo	Visa required		
Democratic Republic of the Congo	eVisa	7 days	Citizens of Turkmenistan may obtain an e-Visa for up to 7 days. The electronic visa must be used within 3 months from the date of issue.
Costa Rica	Visa required		
Côte d'Ivoire	eVisa	3 months	eVisa holders must arrive via Port Bouet Airport.
Croatia	Visa required		
Cuba	eVisa	90 days	Since August 2024, visitors from Turkmenistan may obtain an eVisa valid for 90 days, and extendable for another 90 days.
Cyprus	Visa required		
Czech Republic	Visa required		
Denmark	Visa required		
Djibouti	eVisa	31 days	
Dominica	Visa not required	21 days	
Dominican Republic	Visa required		Holders of a valid visa or a residence permit of any member state of the Schengen Area, Canada, Cyprus, Ireland, the United Kingdom or the United States may enter the Dominican Republic without a visa.; travelers who wants to enter must submit an E-Ticket when enter/exit and present the QR code at immigration.
Ecuador	Visa not required	90 days	
Egypt	Visa required		
El Salvador	Visa required		
Equatorial Guinea	eVisa		
Eritrea	Visa required		
Estonia	Visa required		
Eswatini	Visa required		
Ethiopia	eVisa	up to 90 days	eVisa holders must arrive via Addis Ababa Bole International Airport
Fiji	eVisa		
Finland	Visa required		
France	Visa required		
Gabon	eVisa	up to 6 month	Electronic visa holders must arrive via Libreville International Airport.; Transit without a visa is possible for travellers continuing their trip to a third country by the same or first connecting plane within 24 hours or by the same plane if they are the citizens of Turkmenistan.
Gambia	Visa not required		
Georgia	Visa not required	1 year	
Germany	Visa required		
Ghana	eVisa		Ghana has brought online the official portal that will be used for electronic visa applications starting May 25, 2026.
Greece	Visa required		
Grenada	Visa not required	3 months	
Guatemala	Visa required		Visa is not required up to 90 days if holding a valid residence permit issued by Australia, Canada, GCC member state the United States the United Kingdom or a Schengen Area Member State.
Guinea	eVisa		
Guinea-Bissau	Visa on arrival	90 days	
Guyana	Visa required		
Haiti	Visa not required	3 months	
Honduras	Visa required		Visa is not required if holding a valid visa for at least 6 months at the time of arrival, issued by Canada, the United States or a Schengen Area Member State.
Hungary	Visa required		
Iceland	Visa required		
India	Visa required		
Indonesia	eVisa		
Iran	eVisa / Visa on arrival	30 days	
Iraq	eVisa	30 days	
Ireland	Visa required		
Israel	Visa required		
Italy	Visa required		
Jamaica	Visa on arrival	30 days	
Japan	Visa required		Eligible for an e-Visa if residing in one these countries Australia, Brazil, Cambodia, Canada, India, Saudi Arabia, Singapore, South Africa, Taiwan, United Arab Emirates, United Kingdom, United States.; May apply online
Jordan	eVisa / Visa on arrival	3 months	
Kazakhstan	eVisa		Residents of Balkan Region have visa free access to Atyrau Province and Mangystau Province for up to 5 days.
Kenya	Electronic Travel Authorisation	3 months	Applications can be submitted up to 90 days prior to travel and must be submitted at least 3 days in advance.; eTA fee is 32.50 USD.; Proof of reservation at the hotel where visitors plan to stay is required (if staying with friends, an invitation letter is also acceptable).; Yellow fever vaccination certificate is required if coming from endemic countries.
Kiribati	Visa required		
North Korea	Visa required		
South Korea	Visa required		Visa-free access for 30 days to Jeju Island.
Kuwait	Visa required		
Kyrgyzstan	eVisa		Electronic visa holders must arrive via Manas International Airport or Osh Airport or through land crossings with China (at Irkeshtam and Torugart), Kazakhstan (at Ak-jol, Ak-Tilek, Chaldybar, Chon-Kapka), Tajikistan (at Bor-Dobo, Kulundu, Kyzyl-Bel) and Uzbekistan (at Dostuk).
Laos	eVisa / Visa on arrival	30 days	
Latvia	Visa required		
Lebanon	Free visa on arrival	1 month	1 month extendable for 2 additional months; Granted free of charge at Beirut International Airport or any other port of entry if there is no Israeli visa or seal, holding a telephone number, an address in Lebanon, and a non refundable return or circle trip ticket.
Lesotho	eVisa		
Liberia	eVisa		
Libya	eVisa	30 days	Libya launched an eVisa system on 21 March 2024. Tourist eVisa is valid for 90 days and good for single entry, it allows applicant from Turkmenistan to stay no more than 30 days by paying a 63 USD fee.
Liechtenstein	Visa required		
Lithuania	Visa required		
Luxembourg	Visa required		
Madagascar	eVisa / Visa on arrival	90 days	
Malawi	eVisa	90 days	
Malaysia	Visa not required	90 days	Visa exemptions: maximum stay of 90 days. Visitors from Turkmenistan must hold return/onward tickets. Passports accepted for entry to Malaysia must be valid for a minimum of 6 months from the arrival date. Passengers from Turkmenistan must register online at Malaysia Digital Arrival Card at most 3 days before arrival.
Maldives	Free visa on arrival	30 days	
Mali	Visa required		
Malta	Visa required		
Marshall Islands	Visa on arrival	90 days	
Mauritania	eVisa		Starting January 5, 2025, international travelers to Mauritania will need to apply for an e-Visa via the official National Agency for the Population Register and Secure Titles (ANRPTS) website. Applicants must submit personal details, passport information, and visa requirements online. The available visa durations are 30, 60, or 90 days. Visa fees of €55/$60 are payable upon arrival. The introduction of e-Visas replaces sticker visas, and biometric data will be captured upon entry.
Mauritius	Visa on arrival	60 days	
Mexico	Visa required		
Micronesia	Visa not required	30 days	All visitors arriving in the Federated States of Micronesia must have a valid passport or other travel document issued by the government of the country of citizenship or nationality. The document must be valid for at least 120 days beyond the date of entry. Turkmen citizens are allowed stay of 30 days that may be extended up to 60 days.
Moldova	eVisa		For diplomatic passports visa not required if holding a valid visa /residence permit that is issued by a European Union member state or Schengen Area, Canada, Ireland, UK, US
Monaco	Visa required		
Mongolia	Visa required		
Montenegro	Visa required		Visa not required for holders of a valid Australia, Japan, Canada, New Zealand, Ireland, US, UK or a Schengen Visa.; Holders of residence permit in the United Arab Emirates may enter, in Montenegro for a duration of 10 days
Morocco	Visa required		May apply for an e-Visa if holding a valid visa or a residency document issued by one of the following countries: Schengen Area, Australia, Canada, Ireland, New Zealand, United Kingdom, United States a residency document issued by Cyprus, Japan, United Arab Emirates.
Mozambique	eVisa / Visa on arrival	30 days	
Myanmar	Visa required		
Namibia	eVisa / Visa on arrival	3 months	
Nauru	Visa required		
Nepal	eVisa / Visa on arrival	90 days	
Netherlands	Visa required		
New Zealand	Visa required		Diplomatic and service passports with the former USSR symbol issued in Turkmenistan are unacceptable, and visas will not be endorsed in them.; Holders of an Australian Permanent Resident Visa or Resident Return Visa may be granted a New Zealand Resident Visa on arrival permitting indefinite stay (pursuant to the Trans-Tasman Travel Arrangement), subject to meeting character requirements and obtaining an Electronic Travel Authority prior to departure.
Nicaragua	eVisa		*Citizens of Turkmenistan are eligible to obtain an electronic visa in advance.: Transit without a visa is generally allowed for travelers who normally require a visa but are transiting within 24 hours and hold onward tickets.
Niger	Visa required		
Nigeria	eVisa	90 days	
North Macedonia	Visa required		
Norway	Visa required		
Oman	Visa required		Citizens of the Turkmenistan who hold a valid visa issued by the European Union, Australia, Canada, Japan, United Kingdom or United States may enter Oman without a visa for 14 days.; Turkmenistan citizens, including their spouses and children of another nationality, can obtain an online eVisa, if they hold a valid Schengen Visa, a valid visa from Australia, Canada, Japan, the United Kingdom, or the United States, or a residence permit from one of these countries.
Pakistan	eVisa	90 days	Business and tourist visas are issued online free of charge within 24 hours to citizens of Turkmenistan. To benefit from the program, travelers can obtain a visa pre-approval, called a Visa Prior to Arrival, via the Ministry of Interior’s online platform at least 48 hours before their intended entry to Pakistan. Once approved, they will be issued an electronic authorization (a copy of which must be presented upon arrival) which will allow them to travel to Pakistan and obtain an entry stamp for stays of up to 90 days with multiple entries. Holders of these eVisas can also use eGates to enter the country at nine airports and at Gwadar port.
Palau	Free visa on arrival	30 days	
Panama	Visa required		
Papua New Guinea	eVisa		Citizens of all countries and regions may apply for e-Visa according to their purposes of visit.
Paraguay	Visa required		
Peru	Visa required		
Philippines	Visa not required	30 days	
Poland	Visa required		
Portugal	Visa required		
Qatar	eVisa		
Romania	Visa required		
Russia	eVisa	30 days	The validity period of a single electronic visa is 120 days, and the permitted period of stay for a citizen of Turkmenistan is 30 days.
Rwanda	eVisa / Visa on arrival	30 days	
Saint Kitts and Nevis	eVisa		Visa obtainable online. With a printed approval they are issued a visa on arrival by an Immigration Officer for a fee of USD 100. The maximum length of stay is 30 days.
Saint Lucia	Visa required		
Saint Vincent and the Grenadines	Visa not required	1 month	
Samoa	Visa not required	60 days	
San Marino	Visa required		Since San Marino is only accessible via Italy entrance is not possible without entering the Schengen Area first, therefore Schengen visa rules apply de facto.
São Tomé and Príncipe	eVisa		
Saudi Arabia	Visa required		
Senegal	Visa required		
Serbia	Visa required		
Seychelles	Electronic Border System	3 months	Application can be submitted up to 30 days before travel.; Visitors must upload a reservation confirmation(s) for each visitor's location of stay in Seychelles.; Yellow fever vaccination certificate is required if coming from endemic countries.; Payment of the fee (EUR 10) by credit or debit card.; Valid for one journey only and it expires once exit the country.
Sierra Leone	eVisa		
Singapore	eVisa		Transit without visa: Nationals of Turkmenistan with a confirmed onward ticket for a flight to a third country within 96 hours under the Visa Free Transit Facility (VFTF). They must have documents required for the next destination. Citizens of Turkmenistan may enter Singapore by any mode of transport but must depart by air.
Slovakia	Visa required		
Slovenia	Visa required		
Solomon Islands	Visa required		
Somalia	eVisa	30 days	
South Africa	Electronic travel authorization		
South Sudan	eVisa		Obtainable online; Printed visa authorization must be presented at the time of travel
Spain	Visa required		
Sri Lanka	ETA/ Visa on arrival	30 days	
Sudan	Visa required		
Suriname	eVisa		
Sweden	Visa required		
Switzerland	Visa required		
Syria	eVisa / Visa on arrival	180 days, 90 days / 15 days	According to the Law No. 2 of 2014 all visitors require visas prior to arrival. According to the IATA database, visa may be obtained on arrival and is valid for 15 days.
Tajikistan	eVisa	45 days	Visa also available online. E-visa holders can enter through all border points.
Tanzania	eVisa		
Thailand	eVisa	3 months	From 8 october 2024 eVisa applicants from Turkmenistan are no longer required to submit passports and supporting documents in person at the Thai Embassy in Ankara (Turkey). After the eVisa application has been approved, a confirmation e-mail will be sent to applicants, which can be printed out for presenting to airlines and Thai immigration officials when traveling to Thailand.
Timor-Leste	Visa on arrival	30 days	
Togo	eVisa	15 days	
Tonga	Visa required		
Trinidad and Tobago	eVisa		Multiple Entry Visa 400TTD.
Tunisia	Visa required		Visa not required for tourist groups organised by a travel agency.
Turkey	Visa required		Visa-Free policy was abolished in September 2022; https://www.resmigazete.gov.tr/eskiler/2022/09/20220914.pdf
Tuvalu	Visa on arrival	1 month	
Uganda	eVisa / Visa on arrival		May apply online.
Ukraine	Visa required		
United Arab Emirates	eVisa		May apply online.; May apply also using 'Smart service'.
United Kingdom	Visa required		From 19 November 2024 Turkmen travellers to the United Kingdom submit their visa applications at a VFS Global Visa Application Centre in Ashgabat.
United States	Visa required		With limited exceptions, the proclamation suspends the issuance of new immigrant visas for nationals of Turkmenistan.
Uruguay	Visa required		
Uzbekistan	Visa required		Since February 28, 2024, citizens of Turkmenistan have been granted visa-free entry into the Uzbekistan-Turkmenistan Free Trade Zone. The zone is located on a 3.1-hectare site in the Shavat district of Khorezm.; Residents of Daşoguz Region and Lebap Region have visa free access to Xorazm Province and Bukhara Province as well as to Amudaryo, Xo‘jayli, Shumanay, Qo‘ng‘irot districts and Taxiatosh city of Karakalpakstan and to Dehkanabad, Guzar, Nishon and Myrishkor districts of Qashqadaryo Province and to Sherobod and Muzrabot districts of Surxondaryo Province have visa free access for up to 3 days within any month period.; During Eid al-Fitr and Eid al-Adha the access is allowed twice a month, but no more than 7 days.; 5-day visa-free transit at the international airports if holding a confirmed onward ticket for a flight to a third country.
Vanuatu	eVisa		
Vatican City	Visa required		Open borders but de facto follows Italian visa policy.
Venezuela	Visa required		
Vietnam	eVisa	90 days	e-Visa is valid for 90 days and multiple entry.; Phú Quốc without a visa for up to 30 days.
Yemen	eVisa		Yemen introduces electronic visa system since June 24, 2025.
Zambia	eVisa		
Zimbabwe	eVisa / Visa on arrival	3 months	Turkmenistan citizens not required to apply for a visa before travelling to Zimbabwe, but must pay for and obtain a visa upon entry.

== See also ==
- Visa policy of Turkmenistan
- Turkmen passport
