= Kerpiçli Gas Field =

Kerpiçli Gas Field Kerpiçli gaz ýatagy
- Interactive map of Kerpiçli Gas Field
- Coordinates: 40.050672°N 61.053664°E
- Country: Turkmenistan
- Province: Lebap Province
- District: Darganata

Kerpiçli is a gas condensate field located in Lebap Province, Turkmenistan. It is a source of natural gas.
