= Visa policy of Turkmenistan =

Policy on permits required to enter Turkmenistan

The visa policy of Turkmenistan is among the most restrictive of any country in the world. Citizens of all countries (except Uzbekistan in certain cases) must obtain an e-Visa to enter Turkmenistan unless they have special passports or a United Nations Laissez-Passer. To obtain a tourist, business or humanitarian e-Visa, all foreign citizens must apply only through the event organiser or a tour agency.

Citizens of all countries have the right of visa-free transit through the international transfer area of Ashgabat International Airport.

== Visa policy map ==
Visa policy of Turkmenistan Turkmenistan eVisa (only through the event organiser or a tour agency)

== Visa exemption ==
=== Ordinary passports ===
- United Nations Laissez-Passer — from 2023, foreign citizens with UN passports were allowed up to 30 calendar days from the date of arrival in Turkmenistan without a visa to come to Turkmenistan, stay in it, travel outside it, cross the border, and cross the territory in transit the territory of Turkmenistan. Foreign citizens who are employees of the United Nations or its specialized agencies accredited by the Ministry of Foreign Affairs of Turkmenistan, as well as members of their families, were exempt from visa issuance during the period of work in Turkmenistan.
- Uzbekistan — from November 2025, citizens of Uzbekistan can visit the Shavat-Dashoguz Border Trade Zone without a visa for up to 15 days.

=== Non-ordinary passports ===
Turkmenistan Visa not required for holders of diplomatic and service category passports Visa not required for holders of diplomatic passports Visa on arrival for holders of diplomatic passports Visa required for holders of diplomatic and service category passports

Holders of diplomatic, official and service passports of Armenia, Azerbaijan, Belarus, Bulgaria, China, Georgia, Hungary, Iran, Japan (90 days), Kazakhstan, Kyrgyzstan, Moldova, Mongolia, Romania, Russia, Switzerland, Singapore, Slovakia, South Korea, Tajikistan, Turkey, Ukraine, United Arab Emirates and holders of diplomatic passports of Estonia, India, Pakistan and Uzbekistan do not require a visa to visit Turkmenistan for up to 30 days (unless otherwise stated). Holders of diplomatic passports of Canada and the United States may obtain a free visa on arrival.

== Electronic visa (e-Visa) ==
Starting from 1 October 2026, Turkmenistan has unveiled its new e-Visa portal. The platform now provides details on available visa categories, required documents and processing times ranging from 24 hours to seven business days.

However, the platform is only available to event organisers and tour agencies. They act as a sponsor. They must apply for a tourist, business or humanitarian e-Visa. You cannot apply for one of these visas directly. Independent travel remains prohibited.

== Special permit ==
A special permit, issued prior to arrival by Ministry of Foreign Affairs, is required if visiting the following places: Kerki, Hazar, Dashoguz, Serakhs and Serhetabat.

== Admission restrictions ==
Entry and transit is refused to holders of passports of the following jurisdictions, even if not leaving the aircraft and proceeding by the same flight:

- Abkhazia
- Northern Cyprus
- Sahrawi Arab Democratic Republic
- Somaliland
- South Ossetia
- Transnistria

== Visitor statistics ==
Ashgabat International Airport

Turkmenistan is among the least visited countries in the world. Very few foreigners are granted a Turkmenistani visa. After gaining its independence in 1991, Turkmenistan was a slightly more open country than it is now. For example, 300,000 foreigners visited the country in 1998. Between 2000 and 2013, however, the number of visas issued decreased significantly, due to isolationist policies and a totalitarian regime.

Year	Visitors
1992—1994	No data
1995	▲218,000
1996	▼217,000
1997	▲257,000
1998	▲300,000
1999	No data
2000	▼3,256
2001	▲5,200
2002	▲10,800
2003	▼8,200
2004	▲14,800
2005	▼11,600
2006	▼5,600
2007	▲8,177
2008	▲9,777
2009	▼7,628
2010	▲9,631
2011	▼8,687
2012—2013	No data
2014	▲ More 110,000
2015	▲ More 110,000
2016	▲ More 130,000
2017	▲ More 130,000
2018	▲ More 130,000
Total (1995-1998, 2000-2011 and 2014-2018)	More 1,700,000

Country	2018	2017	2016	2015	2014	2011	2010	2009	2008	2007	2000
Uzbekistan	▲108,288	▲105,269	▲98,176	▲96,604	77,387	No data	No data	No data	No data	No data	No data
Iran	No data	No data	No data	No data	No data	▲3,874	▲3,397	▲2,391	▲2,355	2,133	122
Germany	No data	No data	No data	No data	No data	▼1,143	▼1,277	▼1,392	▲1,576	1,338	270
United States	No data	No data	No data	No data	No data	▼531	▲660	▼535	▲663	566	430
Italy	No data	No data	No data	No data	No data	▼277	▼392	▼412	▼595	600	340
Japan	No data	No data	No data	No data	No data	▼253	▲388	▼344	▼508	537	282
Netherlands	No data	No data	No data	No data	No data	▲245	▼238	▼296	▲439	160	95
France	No data	No data	No data	No data	No data	▼212	▼230	▲315	▼232	682	650
Other	No data	No data	No data	No data	No data	▼2,080	▲2,799	▼1,803	▲3,313	2,081	999
Total	No data	No data	No data	No data	No data	▼8,697	▲9,631	▼7,628	▲9,777	8,177	3,256

=== Citizens of the Russian Federation ===
Country	2021	2020	2019	2018	2017	2016	2015	2014	2013	2012	2011	2010
Russia	▼6,096	▼11,322	▲30,504	▲28,127	▼27,490	▲29,047	▼28,470	▼29,530	▼34,494	▼36,387	▼42,664	45,052

== Transit ==
Passengers transiting through Aşgabat International Airport do not require a visa for direct airside transit only within 24 hours.

== See also ==
- Visa requirements for Turkmen citizens
- Turkmenistan passport
- Ashgabat International Airport
- Turkmenistan Airlines

== Links ==
- State Migration Service of Turkmenistan
