= Doʻstlik =

Doʻstlik may refer to several places in Uzbekistan:

- Doʻstlik, Fergana Region, an urban-type settlement
- Doʻstlik District, Jizzakh Region
- Doʻstlik, Jizzakh Region, a city
- Doʻstlik, Surxondaryo Region, an urban-type settlement
- Doʻstlik, Yangi Namangan District, Namangan Region
- Doʻstlik (Tashkent Metro)
