= Ayribobo =

Highest mountain of Turkmenistan

- Aýrybaba, Ayribaba, Beýik Saparmyrat Türkmenbaşy belentligi
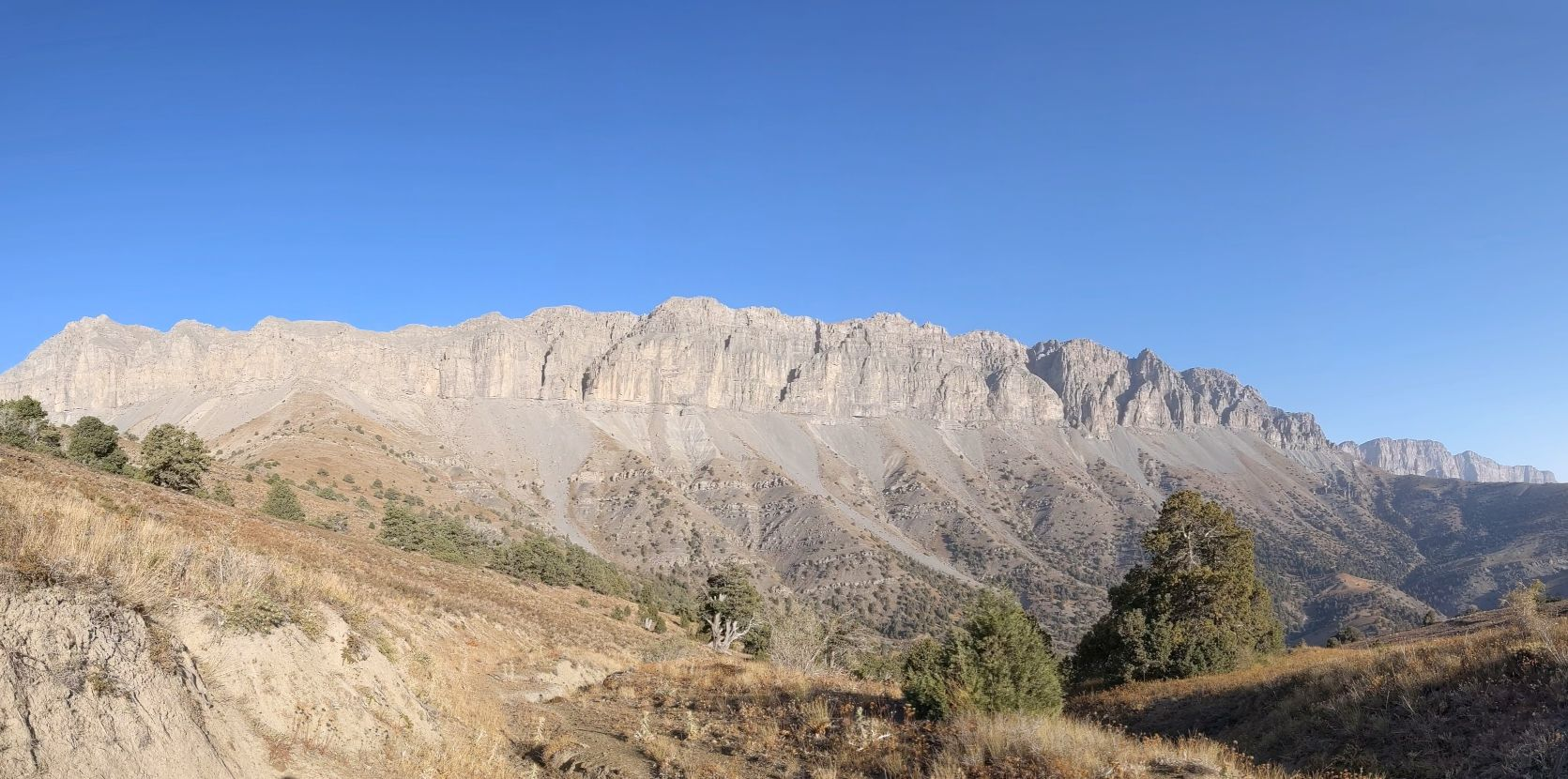
- Summit massif of Aýrybaba

Highest point
- Elevation: 3,138 m (10,295 ft)
- Prominence: 1,639 m (5,377 ft)
- Listing: Country high point Ultra
- Coordinates: 37°47′15″N 66°33′24″E

Geography
- Location within Turkmenistan
- Location: Turkmenistan–Uzbekistan border
- Parent range: Köýtendag Range, Pamir-Alay

Ayribobo (Uzbek: Ayribobo choʻqqisi) or Aýrybaba (Turkmen: Aýrybaba), officially named the Great Saparmyrat Turkmenbashi Peak (Beýik Saparmyrat Türkmenbaşy belentligi) in Turkmenistan since 2004, is a mountain in Central Asia. At 3,138 metres (10,295 ft) Aýrybaba is the highest mountain in Turkmenistan. It is located in the Köýtendag Range of the Pamir-Alay chain in the southeast of Turkmenistan on the Uzbekistani border.

== See also ==
- List of Ultras of Central Asia
- List of elevation extremes by country
