= Amudarya district =

Coordinates: 39.225°N 64.684°E

Amudarya district Әмиўдәрья районы, Ámiwdárya rayonı (Karakalpak)
- District
- Amudarya district
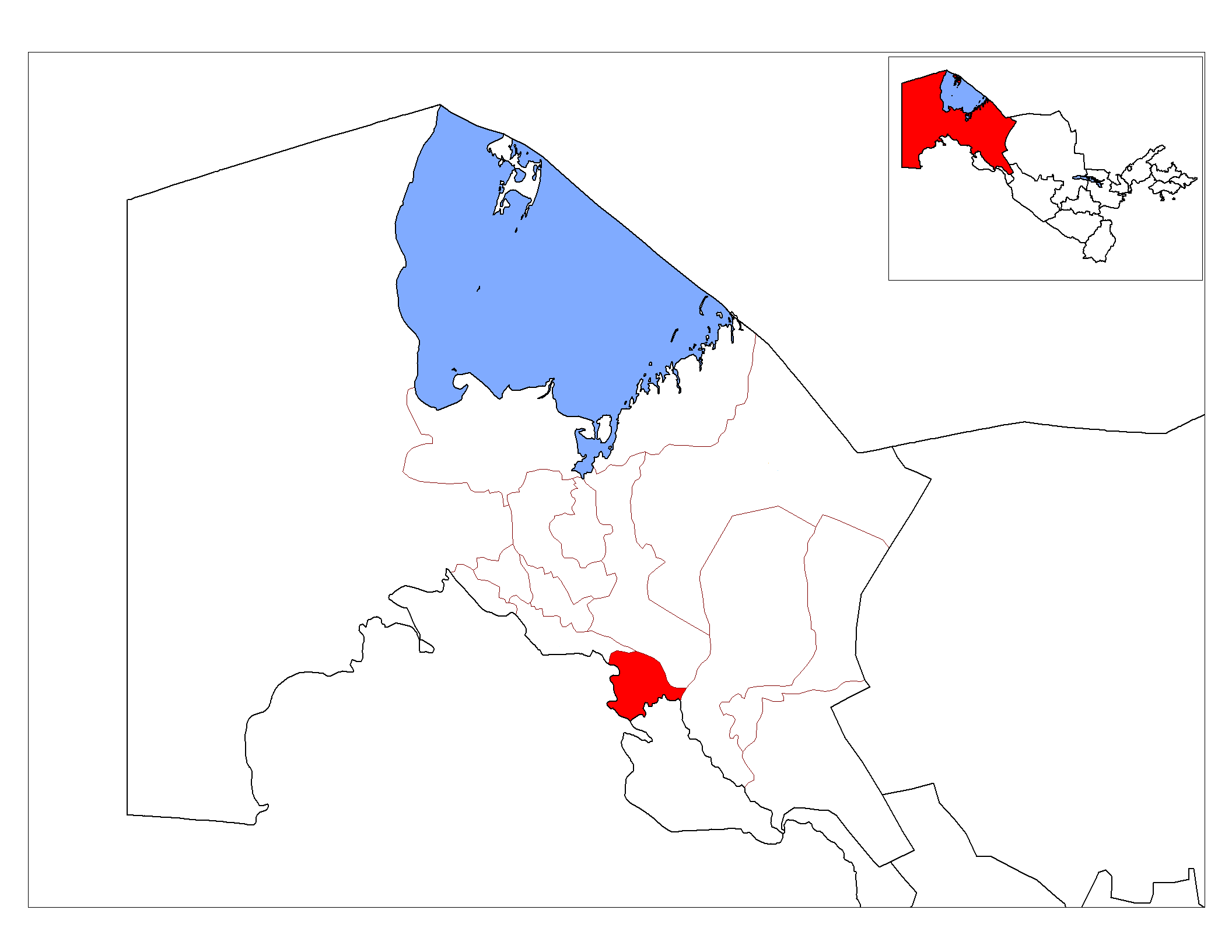
- Country: Uzbekistan
- Autonomous Republic: Karakalpakstan
- Capital: Mangit

Area
  - Total: 1,020 km^{2} (390 sq mi)

Population (2022)
  - Total: 204,700
  - Density: 201/km^{2} (520/sq mi)
- Time zone: UTC+5 (UZT)

The Amudarya district (Karakalpak: Әмиўдәрья районы, Ámiwdárya rayonı) is a district of Karakalpakstan in Uzbekistan. The capital lies at Mańǵıt. Its area is 1,020 km^{2} (390 sq mi), and it had 204,700 inhabitants in 2022.

There are one city Mańǵıt, four towns Jumırtaw, Qıpshaq, Qılıshbay and Qıtay and 16 village councils Nazarxan, Ortaqala, Qıpshaq, Kúyik-kópir, Qıtay, Aqaltın, Shaykól, Qılıshbay, Qańlı, Ámir Temur, Dórmen, Babur atlı, Bozjap, Tolqın, Tasjap and Xalımbeg.

== Notable people ==
The following people were born in the city.

- Islombek Pirmanov (born 1995), boxer.
