= Darganata =

Darganata Birata (2003-2017) Dargan-Ata
- Location in Turkmenistan
- Coordinates: 40°29′N 62°10′E
- Country: Turkmenistan
- Province: Lebap Province
- District: Darganata District

Population (2010)
  - Total: 21,465
- Postal code: 745190

Darganata is the capital city of Darganata District in Lebap Province of Turkmenistan.

From 14 May 2003 to 27 November 2017, the city was called Birata.

== Etymology ==
The name Darganata is of obscure origin. Atanyyazow speculates that dargan might be from an Arabic-origin root referring to "boat" or "hull" (the city is on the Amu Darya) but finds the suffix ata ("father") inexplicable. Paul Brummell notes that the name could be interpreted as "Divided Ata Tribe"; this had prompted the renaming to Birata, meaning "United Ata Tribe"!

== History ==
The place developed out of the Khorezm settlement of Dargan; however, the modern city lies about 3 km north. Nothing exists of the ancient settlement except the wall-perimeter.

On 27 July 2016, the erstwhile town was upgraded to a city; over a year later, on 5 November 2017, its Soviet-era name of Darganata was restored.

== Tourism ==
The Darganata Mausoleum (c. 14th c.) stands between the modern town and the walled perimeter of the ancient settlement; according to local tradition, it is the tomb of Abu Muslim. However, this appears to be untrue since contemporary sources record that Muslim's mutilated body was thrown in the River Tigris.
