= Jumurtov =

- urban-type settlement
- Location in Uzbekistan
- Coordinates: 42°03′36″N 60°14′24″E
- Country: Uzbekistan
- Autonomous Republic: Karakalpakstan
- District: Amudaryo District

Population (2016)
  - Total: 3,500
- Time zone: UTC+5 (UZT)

Jumurtov (Uzbek: Jumurtov/Жумуртов, Russian: Джумуртау, romanized: Dzhumurtau) is an urban-type settlement of Amudaryo District in Karakalpakstan in Uzbekistan. Its population was 2,574 people in 1989, and 3,500 in 2016.
