= Mangʻit =

- City
- Location in Uzbekistan
- Coordinates: 42°07′N 60°04′E
- Country: Uzbekistan
- Autonomous republic: Karakalpakstan
- District: Amudaryo District
- City: 1957
- Elevation: 85 m (279 ft)

Population (2016)
  - Total: 33,200
- Time zone: UTC+5 (UZT)

Mangʻit (Uzbek: Mangʻit, Манғит; Karakalpak: Mańǵıt, Маңғыт; Russian: Мангит) is the seat of Amudaryo District in the autonomous republic of Karakalpakstan within Uzbekistan. It is located on the border with Turkmenistan, about 10 kilometres (6 mi) northeast of the Turkmen town of Gubadag and about 10 kilometres (6 mi) west of the Amu Darya river. It is 50 kilometres (31 mi) southeast of Nukus, the Karakalpak capital. Its population is 33,200 (2016).

== History ==
Mangʻit was the site of battles during the Russian army's Khivan campaign of 1873. The first battle was slightly north of Mangʻit in the morning of 20 May 1873 when Russian troops advancing south under General Nikolai Aleksandrovich Veryovkin were attacked Yomut Turkmen forces. After several fierce skirmishes, the Russians drove off the Turkmen cavalry, which retreated toward Mangʻit. Russian forces entered Mangʻit at 3 p.m. that day to find that the Yomuts had left. Russian troops did kill several Uzbek inhabitants who had remained and fired upon the invading force from the windows of houses in the town.

Soviet Mangʻit was formally founded on 18 December 1957 and gained city status in 1973. As with much of the region, the economy is based on growing and processing cotton. The primary employers are a cotton ginning plant, household services, spinning and sewing shops, Mangit hydroelectric power plant, the gas district and printers. Mangʻit has general education schools, libraries, clubs and cultural centers, hospitals and other medical facilities.

== Demographics ==
Population of Mangʻit
Year	1979	1989	1991	2002	2004	2005	2009	2016
Pop.	16,731	22,949	23,900	31,500	30,700	32,800	35,568	33,200
±% p.a.	—	+3.21%	+2.05%	+2.54%	−1.28%	+6.84%	+2.05%	−0.98%
Source: 1989: All-Union Population Census Archived 2012-01-18 at the Wayback Machine; 1991: Great Encyclopedic Dictionary; 2004: Encyclopaedic Dictionary; 2016:

== Climate ==
Mangʻit

Climate chart (precipitation, max. and min. temperature)
J	F	M	A	M	J	J	A	S	O	N	D
27 −3 −6	14 4 −3	31 16 4	21 27 9	7 36 16	3 40 19	1 38 22	2 35 20	1 29 13	6 22 6	14 14 1	16 2 −6
- █ Average max. and min. temperatures in °C
- █ Precipitation totals in mm
Imperial conversion
J	F	M	A	M	J	J	A	S	O	N	D
1.1 27 21	0.6 39 27	1.2 61 39	0.8 81 48	0.3 97 61	0.1 104 66	0 100 72	0.1 95 68	0 84 55	0.2 72 43	0.6 57 34	0.6 36 21
- █ Average max. and min. temperatures in °F
- █ Precipitation totals in inches

== Notable people ==
The following people were born in the city.

- Islombek Pirmanov (born 1995), boxer.

== Sources ==
- Schmidt, Emil (1876), The Russian Expedition to Khiva in 1873, Calcutta: Foreign Department Press
