= Shomanay =

Shomanay Шоманай, Shomanay
- City
- Shomanay
- Location in Uzbekistan
- Coordinates: 42°38′21″N 58°55′28″E
- Country: Uzbekistan
- Autonomous Republic: Karakalpakstan
- District: Shomanay district
- Elevation: 68 m (222 ft)
- Time zone: UTC+05:00 (UZT)

Shomanay (Karakalpak: Шоманай, Shomanay) is a city and seat of the Shomanay district in Karakalpakstan in Uzbekistan. Its population was 10,513 in 1989, and 14,000 in 2016.

== Climate ==
The city of Shomanay experiences a cold desert climate (Köppen BWk) which features long hot dry summers and cold snowy winters.
