= Doʻstlik, Fergana Region =

Doʻstlik
- urban-type settlement
- Location in Uzbekistan
- Coordinates: 40°20′29″N 71°54′28″E
- Country: Uzbekistan
- Region: Fergana Region
- City: Quvasoy
- Urban-type settlement status: 1981

Population (1998)
  - Total: 2,600
- Time zone: UTC+5 (UZT)

Doʻstlik (Uzbek: Doʻstlik/Дўстлик, Russian: Дустлик) is an urban-type settlement in Fergana Region, Uzbekistan. Administratively, it is part of the city Quvasoy. The town population in 1989 was 2111 people.
