= Darganata District =

Darganata District Darganata District
- District
- Interactive map of Darganata District
- Country: Turkmenistan
- Province: Lebap Province
- Capital: Darganata

Area
  - Total: 5,750 sq mi (14,890 km^{2})

Population (2022 census)
  - Total: 57,952
  - Density: 10.08/sq mi (3.892/km^{2})
- Time zone: UTC+5 (+5)

Darganata District (Turkmen: Darganata etraby) is a district of Lebap Province in Turkmenistan. The administrative center of the district is the town of Darganata.

Between 14 May 2003 and 27 November 2017, the district was called Birata District (Turkmen: Birata etraby).

== Administrative Subdivisions ==
- Cities (şäherler)
  - Darganata (Formerly Birata)
  - Gazojak
- Towns (şäherçeler)
  - Lebap (inc. Sazakly)
- Village councils (geňeşlikler)
  - Çarwadar (Çarwadar)
  - Hojalyk (Hojalyk, Çandyr)
  - Lebap (Krançoba, Sakararyk)
  - Magtymguly (Magtymguly, Ataoba)
  - Sediwer (Sediwer)
