= Islombek Pirmanov =

Uzbek boxer

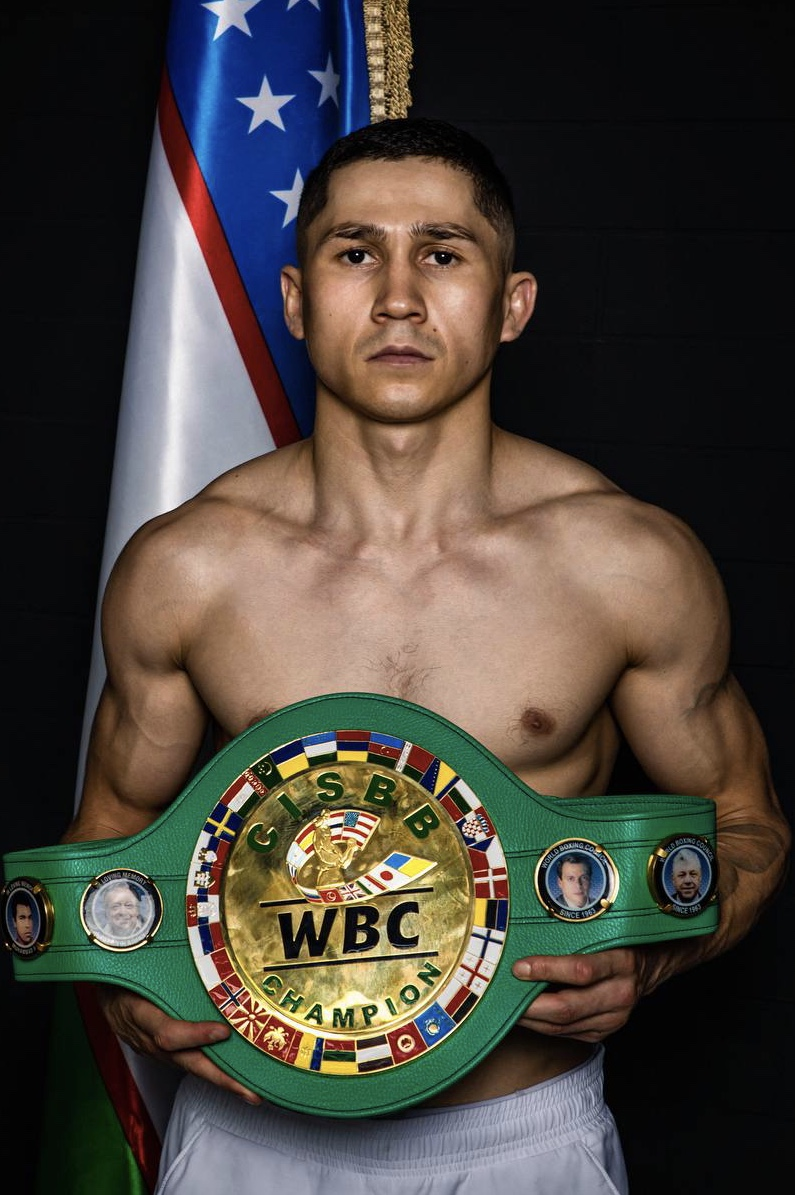

Personal information
- Born: Islombek Pirmanov; February 23, 1995 (age 31) Mangit, Uzbekistan
- Height: 163
- Weight: Lightweight

Boxing career
- Stance: Orthodox

Boxing record
- Total fights: 7
- Wins: 7
- Win by KO: 7

Islombek Pirmanov (born February 23, 1995) is an Uzbekistani professional boxer. As an amateur, he twice won the national junior championship of Uzbekistan. Currently, Islambek is the owner of WBC, WPBF, WBA belts.

== Early life ==
Islombek Pirmanov was born on 23 February 1995, in Mangit, Uzbekistan. He has one younger and one older sister. Starting in elementary school, he learned boxing until entering junior high school. When Islambek was in the 6th grade, his parents moved to Russia to work. He studies at a special boxing school in Moscow. After graduating from school, he continues his professional career in boxing.

== Amateur career ==
During an amateur career in which he compiled a record of 230–12, Pirmanov won multiple national championships at the junior and youth level. In 2013, he moved to Tashkent and continued his career in aerial boxing in Uzbekistan.

== Professional career ==
In 2019, Pirmanov signed the largest advertising contract with 7SABER brands of Uzbekistan.

Pirmanov's professional debut was twice postponed; once due to the COVID-19 pandemic and another after Pirmanov contracted COVID-19. On February 14, 2021, he made his professional debut against Asror Sotvoldiev at the Lokomotiv Sports Palace in Tashkent and won early. Two judges scored the bout 20–20 while the third scored it 20–20.

His second fight for the defense of the WBC Asian belt took place one month later, on March 14, at the Sports Club Hall in Asaka, Andijan region, and he defeated Khumoyun Rustamov by technical knockout (TKO) in the fourth round.

On May 29, 2021, Pirmanov entered the ring against Rauf Agayev from Azerbaijan at the "Universal" sports palace in Tashkent. Pirmanov defeated his opponent by technical knockout (TKO). All three judges decided the fight with a score of 40–35 in favor of Islambek.

On October 15, 2021, in the central stadium of the city of Kongan, Fergana region, Pirmanov won a fight against Russian boxer Alexander Saltikov by premature knockout (TKO).

On July 15, 2022, Pirmanov defended his [World Boxing Council] (WBC) international belt against Kyrgyzstan's Turat Osmonov at the Renaissance Hotel in Tashkent, Pirmanov won by technical knockout (TKO).

On January 29, 2023, Pirmanov defeated Thai boxer Namphon Nonthafani by technical knockout (TKO) in the first round.

== Professional boxing record ==
No.	Result	Record	Opponent	Type	Round, time	Date	Location	Notes
6	Draw	5–0–1	Namphon Nontapha	TKO	1:43	January 29, 2023	Singmanassak Muaythai School, Pathum Thani	
5	Win	5–0	Turat Osmonov	TKO	3:00	July 15, 2022	Hotel Renaissance, Tashkent	
4	Win	4–0	Aleksandr Saltykov	TKO	0:24	October 15, 2021	Markaziy Stadium, Kokand, Uzbekistan	
3	Win	3–0	Rauf Aghayev	TKO	1:17	May 29, 2021	Universal Sport Hall, Tashkent	
2	Win	2–0	Khumoyun Rustamov	TKO	3:00	March 14, 2021	Sport Club Asaka DON, Asaka Uzbekistan	
1	Win	1–0	Asror Sotvoldiev	TKO	1:34	February 14, 2021	Sport Hall "Lokomotiv", Tashkent	

== Awards and nominations ==
2015 - National amateur boxing lightweight champion of Uzbekistan

2016 - Best Air Boxer Golden Gloves National Award

2018 - State Golden Glove Award

2018 - National Golden Gloves Champion, Outstanding Boxer Award

2019 - National PAL Champion, Outstanding Boxer Award

2021 - GQ Best Athlete Uzbekistan

2021 - RizaNova Award 2021 best boxer

2022 - State Golden Glove Award
