= Shomanay district =

Coordinates: 42°37′12″N 59°08′24″E

Shomanay district Шоманай районы, Shomanay rayonı
- District
- Shomanay district
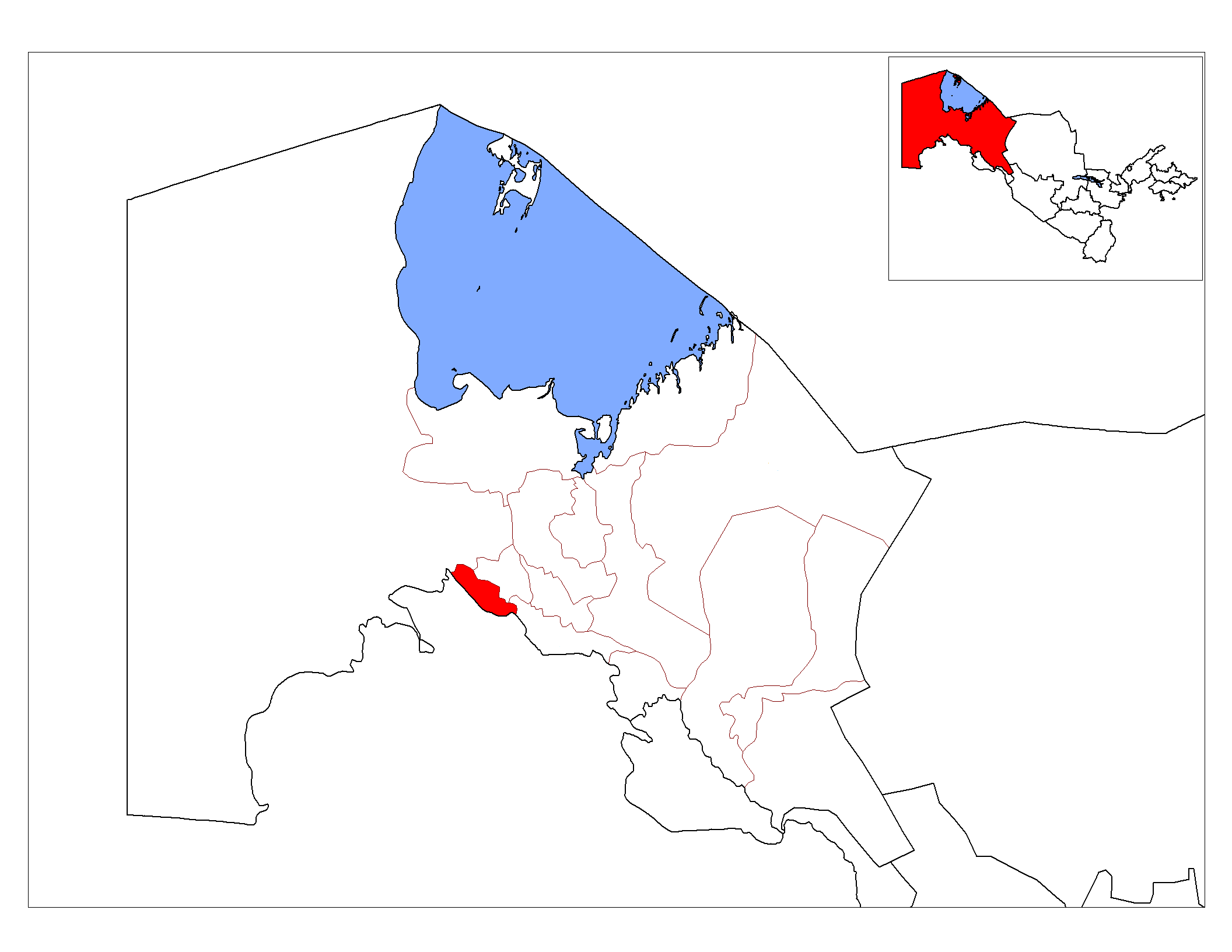
- Country: Uzbekistan
- Autonomous Republic: Karakalpakstan
- Capital: Shomanay

Area
  - Total: 780 km^{2} (300 sq mi)

Population (2022)
  - Total: 57,000
  - Density: 73/km^{2} (190/sq mi)
- Time zone: UTC+5 (UZT)

Shomanay district (Karakalpak: Шоманай районы, Shomanay rayonı) is a district in the Republic of Karakalpakstan. The capital lies at the city Shomanay. Its area is 780 km^{2} (300 sq mi) and it had 57,000 inhabitants in 2022.

There is one city Shomanay and seven rural communities.
