= Gazojak =

Gazojak Gazojak Jürränyň oýy (????–1967)
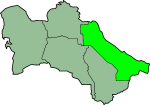

- Location in Turkmenistan
- Coordinates: 41°11′0″N 61°24′0″E
- Country: Turkmenistan
- Province: Lebap Province
- District: Darganata District

Population (2008)
  - Total: 23,454

Gazojak (also Gazochak, Turkmen: Gazojak) is a city located in Darganata District, Lebap Province, Turkmenistan. It serves as a border crossing to Uzbekistan, situated opposite the Pitnyak rail customs point and the Druzhba motor road customs point on the Uzbek side.

== Etymology ==
The local economy revolves around the natural gas industry — hence, the name gaz ojak, meaning "gas furnace", a form of which, Gazachak or Gaz-Achak, it received in 1967. Before that, the settlement was called Jürränyň oýy, "Jürrä's Thought", Jürrä being a masculine name.

== Transport ==
There used to be a domestic airport but it shut down in 2004.
