= Turkmen passport =

Passport issued to the citizens of Turkmenistan

Turkmen passport Türkmenistanyň raýatynyň biometriki maglumatly pasporty
- The front cover of a contemporary Turkmen biometric passport.
- Type: Passport
- Issued by: Turkmenistan
- First issued: July 2008 (first biometric passport); October 2023 (current version)
- Purpose: Identification & International Travel
- Eligibility: Turkmen citizenship
- Expiration: 5 years after issuance
- Cost: 60 Turkmen manat None (children under 16, veterans, disabled people

A Turkmen passport (Turkmen: Türkmenistanyň raýatynyň biometriki maglumatly pasporty) is issued to the citizens of Turkmenistan for the purposes of international travel, and entitles the bearer to the protection of Turkmenistan's consular officials overseas. It is issued by the State Migration Service of Turkmenistan.

== History ==
Following the dissolution of the Soviet Union and the establishment of independent Turkmenistan, blank passports of citizens of the USSR of the 1974 model and foreign passports of citizens of the USSR were used in Turkmenistan, in which the stamp “Citizen of Turkmenistan” was placed. The unified national passport system was introduced in Turkmenistan on October 25, 1996 by the Decree of the President "On Approval of the Regulations on the Passport System in Turkmenistan". According to the approved regulations, the exchange and issuance of national passports of a citizen of Turkmenistan was to be carried out in the period from October 25, 1996 to December 31, 2001.

The passports of the 1996 model were printed and issued with errors and technical shortcomings, which made it difficult for citizens of Turkmenistan to pass through passport control abroad. The passports incorrectly indicated the code of Turkmenistan according to the international standard ISO 3166 (TM instead of TKM), the date of expiration of the passport was not visually seen in the passports (it was indicated only in coded form), the photo of the owner was not pasted, but printed on an inkjet printer, looked blurry, poor contrast and hard to read.

President of Turkmenistan Gurbanguly Berdimuhamedow signed the Decree "On the introduction of a new passport of a citizen of Turkmenistan for exit and entry into Turkmenistan" on October 24, 2005. Samples of new passports were approved at the meeting of the Security Council of Turkmenistan on December 24, 2007. Since July 2008, biometric passports have been introduced, making Turkmenistan the first country in the ex-USSR mid-Asia region to issue an ICAO compliant biometric passport. Concurrently, the separation of two different identity documents was introduced, with the new passports being used only for international travel while internal passport (Turkmen: içerki pasport) officially citizenship passport (Turkmen: raýatlyk pasporty) are used for identification purposes inside Turkmenistan. The new passports also included expiry date. The existing passports were valid for internal use and foreign travel until July 10, 2013. In April 2013 new version of the biometric passport was approved, with more protection, increased volume of electronic chips, and high-quality manufacturing. Previously issued passports are still valid until expiration.

== Appearance ==
Turkmen passports are dark green in color, with the inscription "Turkmenistan" (Turkmen: Türkmenistan) and "Passport" (Turkmen: Pasport) in Turkmen and English on the cover. The Coat of arms of Turkmenistan is embossed in the center of the cover. The passport is produced in Turkmen and English languages.

The standard biometric symbol is imprinted at the bottom of the cover page.

The standard passport contains 48 visa pages.

=== Identity information page ===
The Turkmenistani passport includes the following data:

- Photo of passport holder
- Type (of document, "P" for "personal")
- Code of issuing state (listed as "TKM" for "Turkmenistan")
- Document No.
- Personal No.
- Family name
- Given name
- Citizenship ("Turkmenistan")
- Date of birth
- Sex (M, F)
- Place of birth (only country code listed)
- Date of issue
- Date of expiry
- Holder's signature
- Authority ("SMST")

The information page ends with the machine readable zone.

=== Passport note ===
The passports contain inside the front cover a note that is addressed to the authorities of all countries and territories, identifying the bearer as a citizen of Turkmenistan and requesting that the bearer be allowed to pass and be treated according to international norms:

Main page: This passport is the property of

Turkmenistan. The holder of this passport is under the protection of Turkmenistan.

Page 1: This passport contains sensitive electronics For best performance please do-not bend, pertorate or expose to extreme temperatures, excess moisture, magnetic field and microwaves.

Page 48: This passport is valid for all countries of the world. It authorizes its holder to travel abroad and to return to Turkmenistan during validity of the passport. Except as otherwise endorsed elsewhere, the possession of this passport so endorsed does not exempt the holder from the necessity of obtaining visas and fulfilling the immigration requirements when required.

The loss, theft or destruction of this passport must be immediately reported to the migration offices in your country or, if abroad, the nearest Embassy or Consulate of Turkmenistan.

=== Languages ===
The passport is printed in Turkmen and English.

== Visa requirements ==
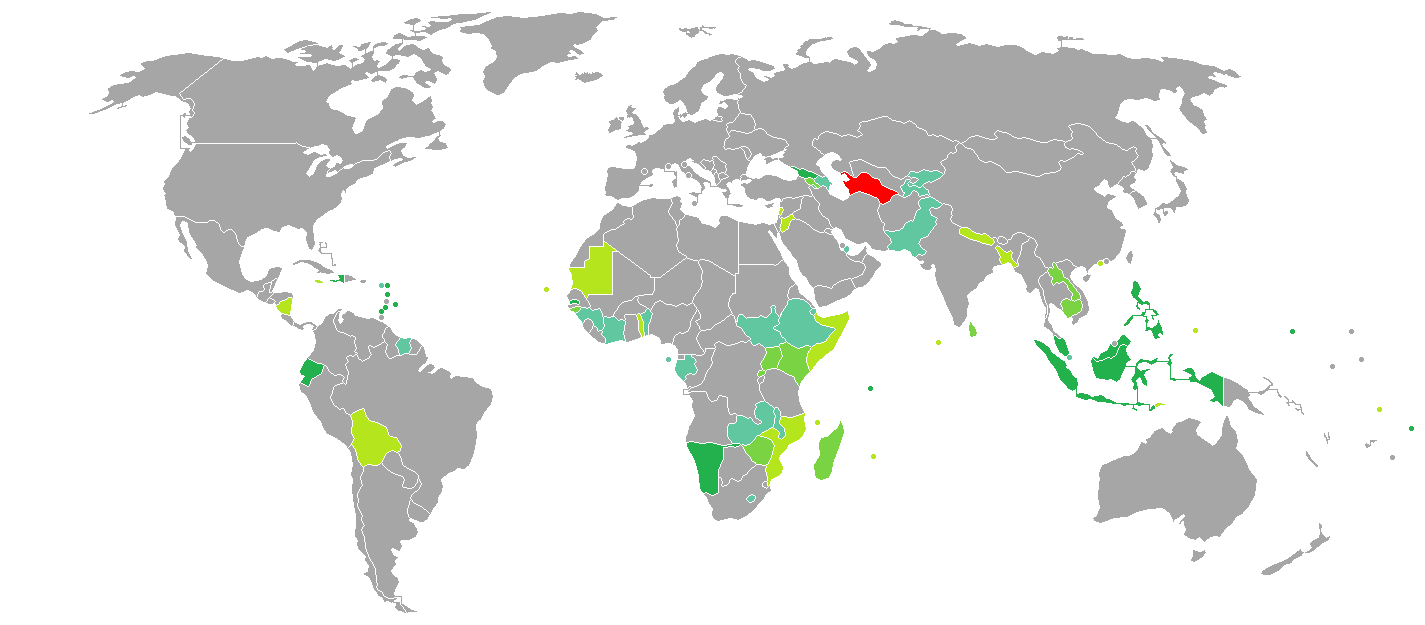
Countries and territories with visa-free entries or visas on arrival for holders of regular Turkmen passports

In 2022, Turkmen citizens had visa-free or visa on arrival access to 58 countries and territories, ranking the Turkmen passport 74th in the world according to The Passport Index.

== Issues ==
Turkmenistan is one of the few countries that does not renew expired passports at their foreign diplomatic missions. Instead, the embassies and the consulates of Turkmenistan put a stamp on the last pages of the expired passports claiming that the passport has been "extended". After a total lockdown after the onset of the global COVID-19 pandemic, many Turkmen nationals abroad have been trapped in a limbo with expired passports and a stamp that claims to "extend" the validity of the passport alongside a QR code that, when scanned (with an Android device), opens a Google search query which includes passport details in text format. As of middle 2022, it remains unclear if the stamp and a QR code are regarded as legitimate abroad.

== Types ==
Diplomatic (dark green)
Service (dark blue)
Simple (green)

== See also ==
- Visa requirements for Turkmen citizens
