= Köýtendag Range =

Mountain range in Turkmenistan

Köýtendag
- Location within Turkmenistan

Highest point
- Peak: Aýrybaba
- Elevation: 3,139 m (10,299 ft)
- Coordinates: 37°40′0″N 66°33′0″E

Geography
- Location: Lebap Region, Turkmenistan

Köýtendag Range is a spur of the Pamir-Alay mountains in the south-east of Turkmenistan, extending along the border with Uzbekistan's Surxondaryo Region. Its height of 3,139 metres (10,299 ft) at Mount Aýrybaba makes it the highest summit in Turkmenistan.

The Köýtendag Nature Reserve is located within the range.
