= List of Turkmenistan Airlines destinations =

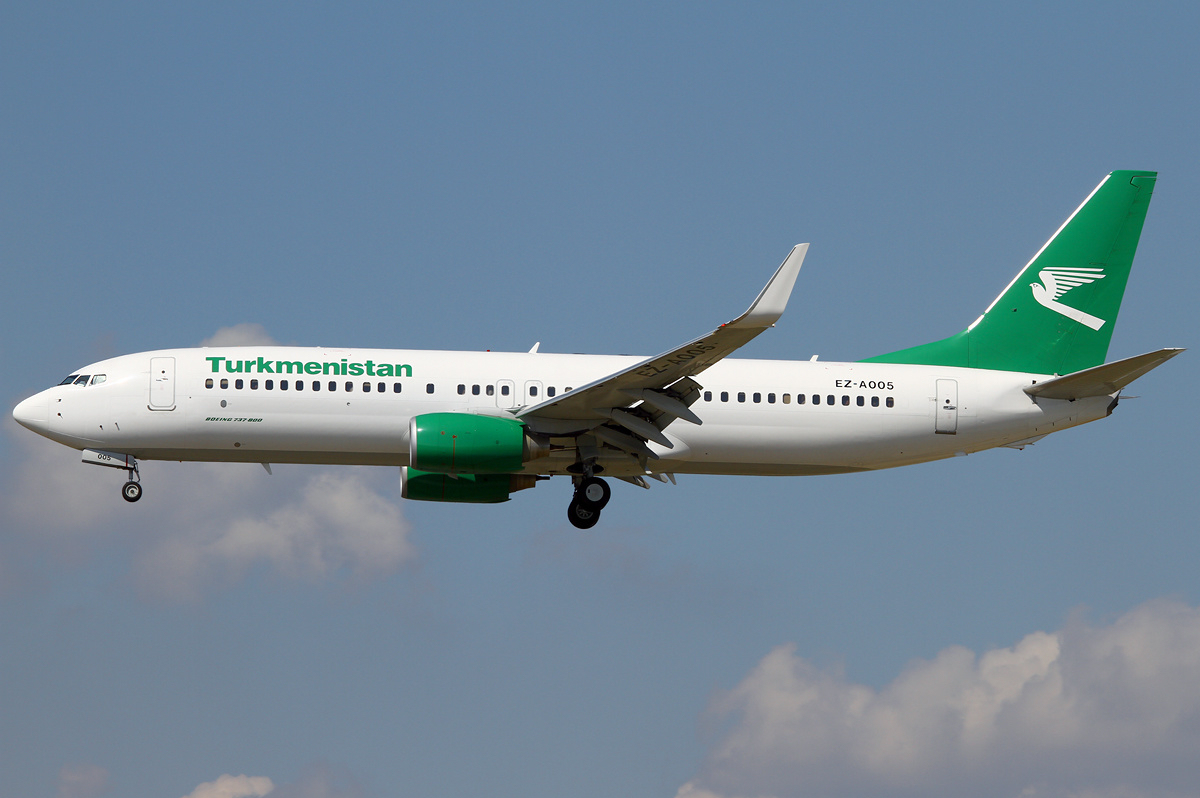
Turkmenistan Airlines Boeing 737-800

Following is a list of the current and former destinations served by Turkmenistan Airlines, as of May 2025. The list includes the city, country, and the airport's name, with the airline's hub, focus airports, cargo services, future and terminated destinations marked.

== List ==
Country	City	Airport	Notes	Refs
Armenia	Yerevan	Zvartnots International Airport	Terminated	
Belarus	Minsk	Minsk National Airport	Terminated	
China	Beijing	Beijing Capital International Airport	Passenger + cargo	
China	Shenzhen	Shenzhen International Airport	Cargo	
China	Ürümqi	Ürümqi Diwopu International Airport	Terminated	
France	Paris	Charles de Gaulle Airport	Terminated	
Germany	Frankfurt	Frankfurt Airport	Passenger + cargo	
India	Amritsar	Sri Guru Ram Das Ji International Airport	Terminated	
India	Delhi	Indira Gandhi International Airport	Passenger	
Italy	Milan	Milan Malpensa Airport	Passenger + cargo	
Japan	Tokyo	Haneda Airport	Terminated	
Kazakhstan	Almaty	Almaty International Airport	Terminated	
Latvia	Riga	Riga International Airport	Terminated	
Malaysia	Kuala Lumpur	Kuala Lumpur International Airport	Passenger	
Russia	Kazan	Ğabdulla Tuqay Kazan International Airport	Passenger	
Russia	Moscow	Moscow Domodedovo Airport	Suspended	
Russia	Moscow	Sheremetyevo International Airport	Terminated	
Russia	Saint Petersburg	Pulkovo Airport	Terminated	
Saudi Arabia	Jeddah	King Abdulaziz International Airport	Passenger	
Saudi Arabia	Medina	Prince Mohammad bin Abdulaziz International Airport	Seasonal	
South Korea	Seoul	Incheon International Airport	Passenger + cargo	
Thailand	Bangkok	Suvarnabhumi Airport	Passenger	
Tajikistan	Dushanbe	Dushanbe International Airport	Terminated	
Turkey	Ankara	Ankara Esenboğa Airport	Suspended	
Turkey	Erzurum	Erzurum Airport	Terminated	
Turkey	Istanbul	Atatürk Airport	Airport closed	
Turkey	Istanbul	Istanbul Airport	Passenger + cargo	
Turkmenistan	Aşgabat	Aşgabat International Airport	Hub	
Turkmenistan	Balkanabat	Balkanabat International Airport	Passenger	
Turkmenistan	Daşoguz	Daşoguz Airport	Passenger + cargo	
Turkmenistan	Kerki	Kerki Airport	Passenger	
Turkmenistan	Mary	Mary International Airport	Passenger + cargo	
Turkmenistan	Türkmenabat	Türkmenabat International Airport	Passenger + cargo	
Turkmenistan	Türkmenbaşy	Türkmenbaşy International Airport	Passenger	
United Arab Emirates	Abu Dhabi	Zayed International Airport	Suspended}	
United Arab Emirates	Dubai	Al Maktoum International Airport	Suspended	
United Arab Emirates	Dubai	Dubai International Airport	Suspended	
United Kingdom	Birmingham	Birmingham Airport	Terminated	
United Kingdom	Manchester	Manchester Airport	Terminated	
United Kingdom	London	Gatwick Airport	Passenger	
United Kingdom	London	Heathrow Airport	Terminated	
United Kingdom	London	London Stansted Airport	Terminated	
Vietnam	Hanoi	Noi Bai International Airport	Cargo	
Vietnam	Ho Chi Minh City	Tan Son Nhat International Airport	Passenger	
