= Aeroflot Flight 191 =

1963 aviation accident

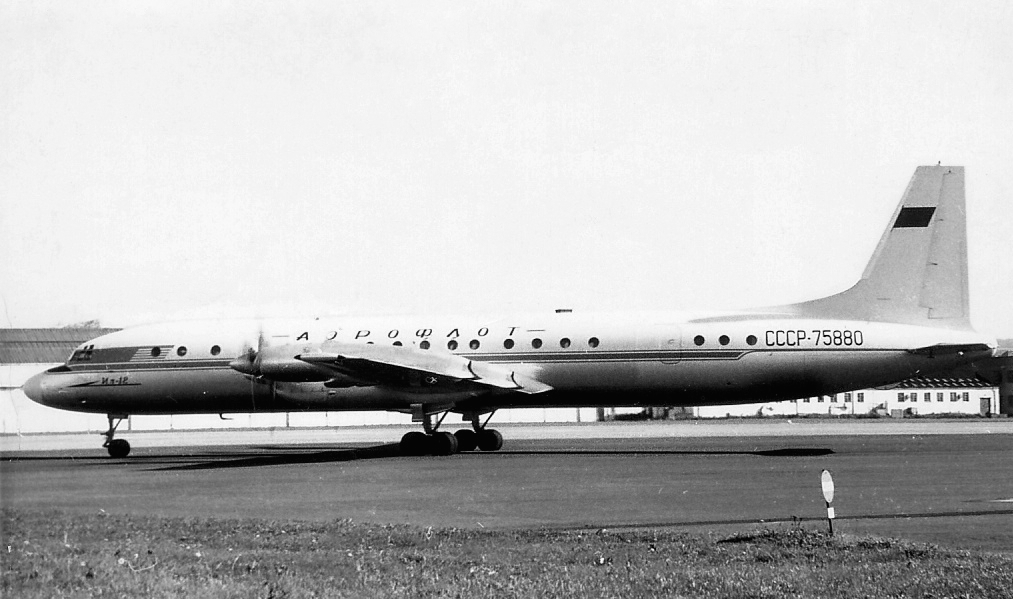
- An Aeroflot Ilyushin Il-18, similar to the one involved in the crash

Accident
- Date: 5 March 1963
- Summary: Dust storm, crashed short of runway
- Site: Ashkhabad International Airport

Aircraft
- Aircraft type: Ilyushin Il-18V
- Operator: Aeroflot
- Registration: CCCP-75765
- Flight origin: Vnukovo Airport, Moscow
- Stopover: Krasnovodsk Airport, Krasnovodsk
- Destination: Ashgabat International Airport, Ashgabat
- Passengers: 43
- Crew: 11
- Fatalities: 12
- Survivors: 42

Aeroflot Flight 191 was a Soviet domestic passenger flight from Vnukovo International Airport to Ashkhabad (now Ashgabat) International Airport, with a stopover in Krasnovodsk Airport (now Turkmenbashi International Airport). On 5 March 1963, the Ilyushin Il-18 crashed while landing at Ashgabat International Airport as a result of a dust storm. 12 of the 54 people on board were killed.

== Aircraft ==
The aircraft involved was an Il-18V with tail number of CCCP-75765 and a serial number of 181003404. The aircraft was launched on 28 June 1961 and was transferred to Turkmenistan Airlines. At the time of the crash, the aircraft had 2,098 flight hours and 1,213 landings.

== Accident ==
The flights route was from Vnukovo International Airport to Ashgabat International Airport with a stopover at Turkmenbashi International Airport. At 18:04, Flight 191 took off from Turkmenbashi with 43 passengers. According to the weather forecast of the crew in Ashgabat, the sky was covered by cumulonimbus clouds with a lower boundary of 600-1,000 meters. The visibility was 4-10 kilometers. After 21:00, the weather was expected to deteriorate with a dust storm containing northwestern winds at 18–20 m/s and resulting in a visibility of less than 1,000 meters. According to such data, the crew could have completed the flight before the weather worsened. But, the weather worsened much faster than expected and at 17:00, the weather forecaster of Ashgabat Airport issued new data. However, the weather forecaster at Krasnovodsk Airport did not inform the crew about the change in forecast.

Five to twenty minutes after departure from Krasnovodsk, at a flight level of 6,000 meters, the aircraft encountered heavy turbulence, making the crew change course. At 19:15, the air traffic controller gave the crew information of a dust storm with a visibility of 300 meters. Because of the strong radio interference caused by the storm, the crew did not hear this data. Since the aircraft had a visibility of 5 kilometers and was already flying in difficult weather conditions, the pilots did not try to find out the updated weather forecast. The air traffic controllers made no attempt to re-contact the aircraft to report the actual weather and redirect it to an alternate airport.

When the aircraft was 25 kilometers north of the airport, the crew began to perform a landing approach with a heading of 295°. Due to strong atmospheric interference, the radio compass began to give false readings, including the flights non-directional beacon. The crew discovered this error and brought the plane to the area of the beacon. After the 3rd and 4th U-turns, the aircraft, at an altitude of 400 meters, entered its final approach. The first officer took over the controls. The crew reported that they saw the runway lights and began to approach the runway. While landing, the aircraft headlights were turned on, which is a mistake in a dust storm as it creates a screen that reduces visibility.

While attempting to land, the aircraft unexpectedly fell into strong turbulence with a wind of 20-25 m / s and visibility dropping to 30 meters. The aircraft began to roll severely causing the flight instruments to malfunction. At one point, the aircraft was only 7 meters from the ground and 250 meters from the runway with a roll of 5–7°. The leftmost wheel hit a runway light 6 meters high and the right wheel knocked down a telegraph pole 7 meters high. 150 meters from the runway, having lost speed, the aircraft began to descend, hitting the reinforced concrete pillar of runway lights 100 meters from the site of the first collision. With a roll of 30°, the aircraft began to bring down reinforced concrete pillars, then the runway fence, after which it crashed 1,012 meters from the end of the runway.

While skidding on the runway, the airliner lost both wings and the cockpit was completely destroyed. The fuselage tipped over on its left side. There was a fire in which the entire middle section of the aircraft burned. All 8 cockpit crew members died along with 4 passengers.

== Cause ==
The immediate cause of the disaster was flying in violation of minimum weather standards. As a result, the aircraft flew into dangerous weather. The air traffic controllers were blamed for the crash as they did not give the crew updated weather information or attempt to offer the flight an alternate airport. The air traffic controllers also decided to land the plane in dangerous weather conditions. A mistake was made by the crew as well as they did not try to seek updated weather information.
