= Aeroflot Flight 699 =

1988 Russian aircraft accident

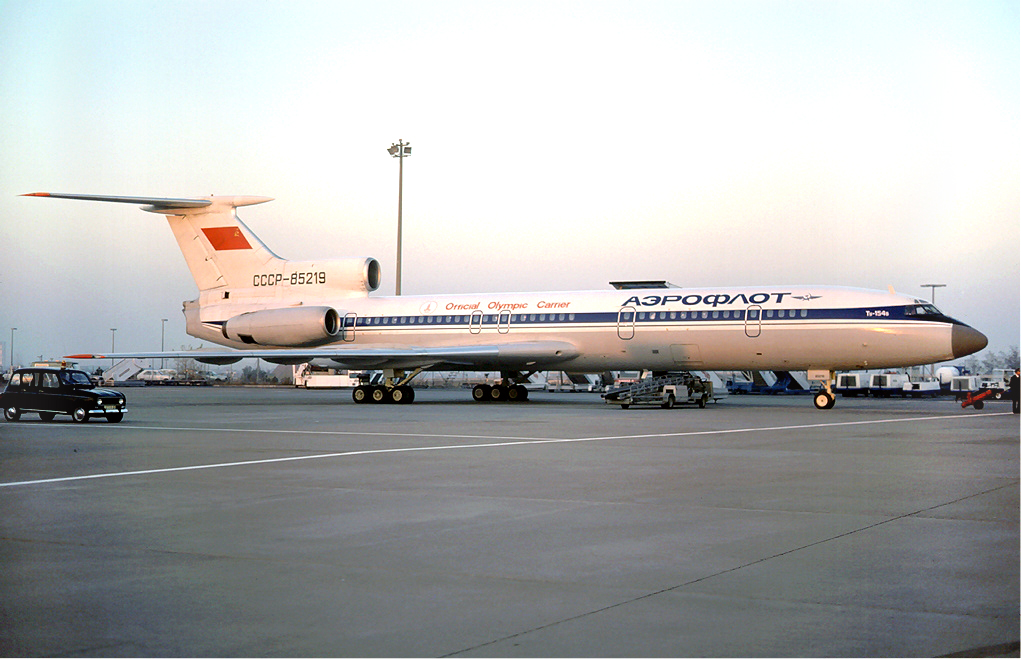
- CCCP-85219 sister-ship to the accident aircraft

Accident
- Date: 18 January 1988
- Summary: Pilot error, heavy landing
- Site: Krasnovodsk Airport; 40°3′55″N 53°0′22.67″E

Aircraft
- Aircraft type: Tupolev Tu-154B-1
- Operator: Aeroflot
- Registration: CCCP-85254
- Flight origin: Domodedovo Airport, Moscow
- Stopover: Krasnovodsk Airport
- Destination: Aşgabat International Airport, Ashgabat
- Occupants: 148
- Passengers: 137
- Crew: 9
- Fatalities: 11
- Survivors: 135

Aeroflot Flight 699 was a scheduled flight, operated by Tupolev Tu-154B CCCP-85254, from Moscow Domodedovo Airport to Krasnovodsk Airport (now Türkmenbaşy International Airport) that crashed on approach to its destination.

== Accident ==
The aircraft made a very heavy landing and broke apart, after a poorly executed approach by an inexperienced co-pilot.

== Aircraft ==
The accident aircraft was a Tupolev Tu-154B-1 operated by Aeroflot, registered as CCCP-85254 (msn 78A254), which was first flown in 1977 and had a total of 15859 flying hours accumulated over 8082 cycles.

== Investigation ==
The investigation found the aircraft to be serviceable at the time of the crash with no significant faults. The crew came under the spotlight and were found to be seriously lacking in crew resource management and skills to carry out a challenging approach. The Pilot in Charge allowed an inexperienced co-pilot to carry out the approach without close supervision, which resulted in an unstable approach and very heavy landing estimated at 4.8g. The aircraft's tail broke off and 11 passengers were thrown from the fuselage and killed.

== Causes ==
The primary cause of the accident was the poor crew resource management of the Pilot in Charge, who failed to closely monitor the Pilot Flying who had limited experience and skill.

== Summary ==
The aircraft was handled poorly on the approach, had a very heavy landing and broke-up, killing 11 passengers.
