= Coyne Airways =

Cargo airline based in the United Kingdom

IATA	ICAO	Call sign
7C	COY	COYNE AIR
- Founded: 1994; 32 years ago
- Operating bases: Cologne/Bonn; Dubai–International; London–Stansted; Tbilisi
- Destinations: 18
- Parent company: Coyne Aviation Limited
- Headquarters: London, England, United Kingdom
- Key people: Larry Coyne (MD)
- Website: www.coyneair.com

Coyne Airways is an all cargo airline based in London, England, United Kingdom. It has a separate operation in Dubai, United Arab Emirates. It operates scheduled cargo flights to Georgia, Armenia, Azerbaijan, Kazakhstan, Afghanistan, Iraq, United Arab Emirates, using Antonov, Boeing and Ilyushin aircraft as required. Its main bases are London Stansted Airport, Cologne Bonn Airport and Dubai International Airport.

== History ==
The airline was established and started operations in 1994. It started as a charter broker specialising in the CIS market. In 1997 it pioneered scheduled freighter services to the Caspian starting with Baku but later adding Tbilisi, Yerevan, Aktau, Atyrau and Uralsk. In December 2006, it began serving this region with a B747 400F from Stansted to Cologne to its hub in Tbilisi, where freight is then transferred to smaller aircraft for distribution around the region.

In July 2002, it inaugurated a freighter service between Seoul and Yuzhno-Sakhalinsk to meet the growing need for oil and gas development on Sakhalin Island in the Russian Far East.

In 2004, it set up the first (and only scheduled freighter services according to the Official Airline Guide) into Iraq serving Baghdad and many destinations around the country. In 2006 it set up scheduled services into Afghanistan, serving Kandahar, Kabul and Bagram twice-weekly.

It also serves Djibouti in the Horn of Africa and Sana'a, Yemen. In January 2008, it commenced Boeing 747 operations into Lagos, Nigeria. These were discontinued in April 2008.

== Destinations ==
Coyne Airways operates freight services to the following destinations (as of June 2013):

- Afghanistan
  - Bagram – Bagram Air Base
  - Kabul – Kabul International Airport
  - Kandahar – Kandahar International Airport
- Armenia
  - Yerevan – Zvartnots International Airport
- Azerbaijan
  - Baku – Heydar Aliyev International Airport
- Georgia
  - Tbilisi – Tbilisi International Airport Base
- Iraq
  - Baghdad – Baghdad International Airport
  - Balad – Joint Base Balad
  - Erbil – Erbil International Airport
- Kazakhstan
  - Aktau – Aktau Airport
  - Atyrau – Atyrau Airport
  - Oral – Oral Ak Zhol Airport
- Turkmenistan
  - Ashgabat – Ashgabat Airport
  - Türkmenbaşy – Turkmenbashi Airport
- United Arab Emirates
  - Dubai – Dubai International Airport Base
- United Kingdom
  - London – Stansted Airport Base

== Fleet ==
Coyne Airways do not have their own aircraft, and instead charter the following:

Coyne Airways fleet
Aircraft	In fleet
Antonov An-12	1
Boeing 747-400F	1
Ilyushin Il-76	1
Tupolev Tu-204C	1
Total	4
