= Mary International Airport =

International airport in Mary, Mary Province, Turkmenistan

Mary International Airport Mary halkara howa menzili
- IATA: MYP; ICAO: UTAM

Summary
- Airport type: Public
- Operator: Turkmenhowayollary Agency
- Location: Mary
- Coordinates: 37°36′24″N 61°54′05″E
- Website: www.maryairport.gov.tm

Map
- Location of airport in Turkmenistan

Runways
Direction	Length		Surface
Direction	m	ft	Surface
18L/36R	2,820	9,186	Concrete
18R/36L	3,800	12,467	Concrete
- Source: AIP Turkmenistan

Mary International Airport is the third largest international airport in Turkmenistan. In March 2009, the airport was expanded with a new terminal and opened a US$5 million, two-story, 3,500-square-metre terminal and upgraded its status from provincial to international airport. The airport is located 6 km north-east of the centre of Mary.

== Airlines and destinations ==
=== Passenger ===
Airlines	Destinations
Turkmenistan Airlines	Ashgabat, Balkanabat, Daşoguz

=== Cargo ===
Airlines	Destinations
Turkmenistan Airlines	Ashgabat, Bangkok–Suvarnabhumi, Daşoguz, Türkmenbaşy (suspended)
