= Ashgabat Fountain =

Fountain complex in Ashgabat, Turkmenistan

Coordinates: 37.9736°N 58.3903°E

Ashgabat Fountain is a fountain complex located in Ashgabat, Turkmenistan. The complex currently holds two entries in the Guinness Book of Records: one for its size and one for "Most Fountain Pools in a Public Place." Constructed by the Turkish company Polimeks in 2008, the Ashgabat Fountain is located on the road leading from Ashgabat Airport to the city center of Ashgabat.

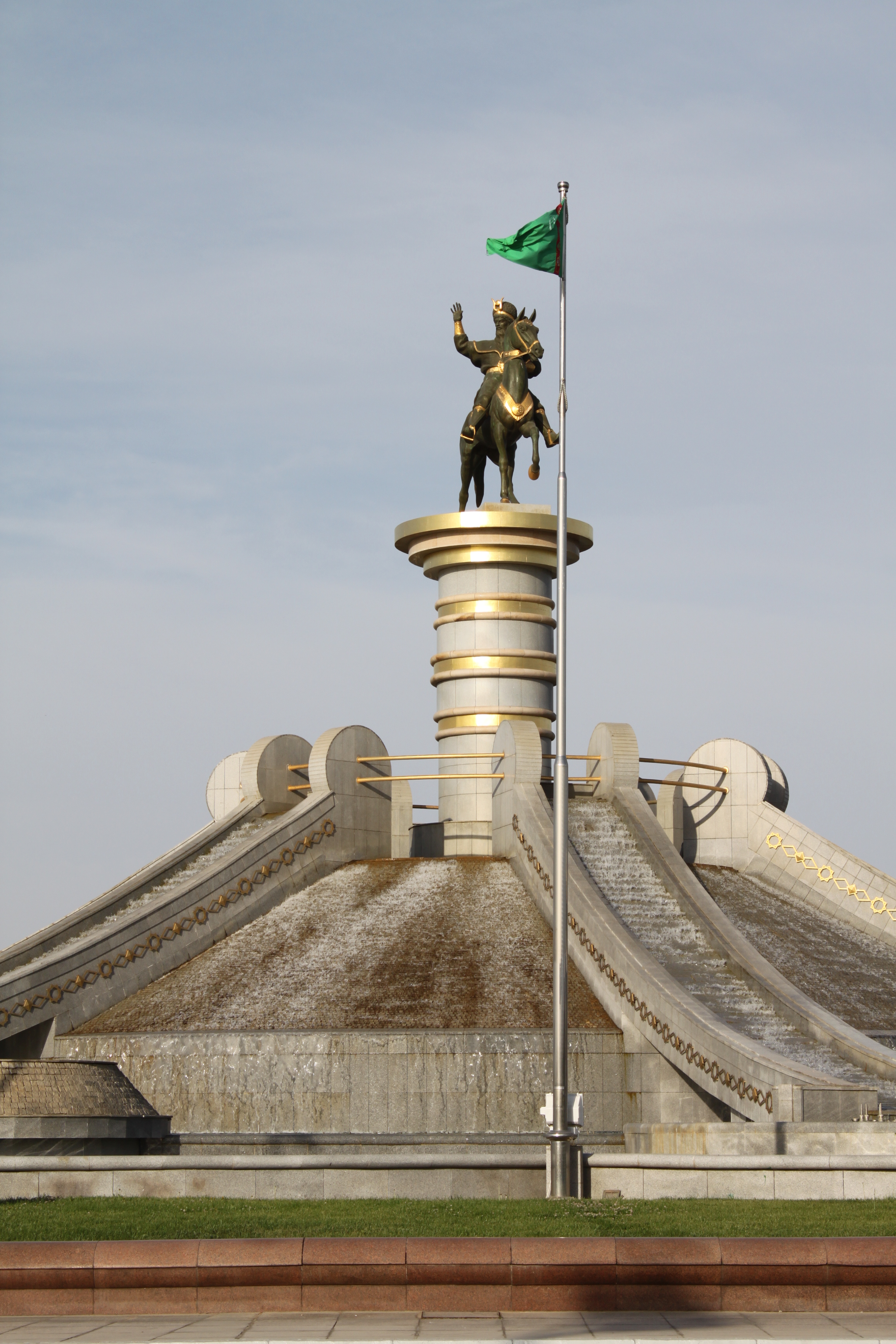
Oguz Khan monument

The Ashgabat Fountain has many decorative elements and is set in impressive landscaping. It is composed of a large-scale system of water jet that is accompanied by music and lights to hold displays. The pool and fountain complex spans 125,000 square meters (12.5 ha) and features 27 synchronized, illuminated, and fully programmable fountains. The fountain's lighting system is powered by solar energy. The complex was designed to represent the legendary ancestors of the Turkic people: Oguz Khan and his six sons: Gün Khan (Lord of the Sun), Ay Khan (Lord of the Moon), Yildiz Khan (Lord of the Stars), Gök Khan (Lord of Heaven), Dag Khan (Ruler of the Mountains) and Deniz Khan (Ruler of the Sea). The project's creative direction was led by the "People's Artist of Turkmenistan," Babasary Annamuradov. According to the sculpture's creators, it is meant to evoke the Turkmen people's peacefulness, their unbreakable unity, and cohesion, and the creative spirit and power of modern Turkmenistan.

== Links ==
- Photos of the opening
- Fountain in Polimeks Insaat
- Ashgabat in Guinness Book
