= Daşoguz International Airport =

Provincial airport in Dashoguz, Dashoguz Province, Turkmenistan

Dashoguz International Airport Daşoguz halkara howa menzili
- IATA: TAZ; ICAO: UTAT

Summary
- Airport type: Public
- Operator: Turkmenhowayollary Agency
- Location: Daşoguz, Daşoguz Region, Turkmenistan
- Coordinates: 41°45′53″N 59°49′59″E
- Website: https://dashoguzairport.gov.tm/

Map
- Location of airport in Turkmenistan

Runways
Direction	Length		Surface
Direction	m	ft	Surface
08/26	3,800	12,467	Concrete
- Source: AIP Turkmenistan

Dashoguz International Airport (Turkmen: Daşoguz halkara howa menzili) (IATA: TAZ, ICAO: UTAT) (also spelled Daşoguz) is a major airport in Daşoguz Region, Turkmenistan located 15 km southwest of Daşoguz. The airport mostly serves scheduled domestic destinations. The airport's capacity is 400 people per hour.

== History ==
The first flight was in September 1924 from Kagan-Dashoguz-Khiva, then it became a regular flight.

Since 1940, it has allowed flights from Chardzhou-To‘rtko‘l-Tashauz. In the Soviet period, there were regular flights to Moscow, Leningrad, Tashkent, Ashgabat, Ufa, Mineralnye Vody and other airports in the USSR.

On 10 October 1973, due to a malfunction of the fuel system, an Lisunov Li-2 plane crashed near the airport, killing five. After this incident, Aeroflot retired all civil Li-2s.

The new terminal building was opened in 1984.

Reconstruction of the terminal building, with modern equipment was completed in 2009. The airport terminal is allowed to serve up to 300 passengers per hour.

In 2013, building of an air traffic control tower with a height of 50 metres started along with main and connecting taxiways and an apron for aircraft worth $200 million. The project created an artificial runway length of 3800 metres, 5 taxiways and an apron for aircraft parking. There are plans for the construction of a passenger terminal building with 4 gates and a capacity for 500 passengers per hour along with the building of a VIP terminal and other buildings and structures.

In 2015, the Ukrainian company Altcom reconstructed the runway, its dimensions were increased to 3800 × 60 metres (there are 2 × 7.5 metres shoulders). The aerodrome is equipped with modern aeronautical and automated meteorological technical means.

== Airlines and destinations ==
=== Passenger ===
Airlines	Destinations
Turkmenistan Airlines	Aşgabat, Balkanabat, Mary, Türkmenabat

=== Cargo ===
Airlines	Destinations
Turkmenistan Airlines	Ashgabat, Bangkok–Suvarnabhumi, Mary, Türkmenbaşy (suspended)

== Infrastructure ==
The airport services airliners and helicopters of all sizes, including planes as large as the Boeing 747, and the Il-96. Its ICAO category is 4E, all weather condition ICAO CAT1 . Airport have 24/7 ATC operations and 10 parking places for planes. Dashoguz Airport serves as a key base for AN-2 aircraft in Turkmenistan.

== Ground transportation ==
The Daşoguzawtoulag company offers services at Daşoguz Airport. The taxi rank and bus stop is located just outside the arrivals hall.

== Links ==
- Official web-site
- New runway
