= Daşoguz =

Capital of Dashoguz Province, Turkmenistan

Daşoguz Daşoguz şäheri
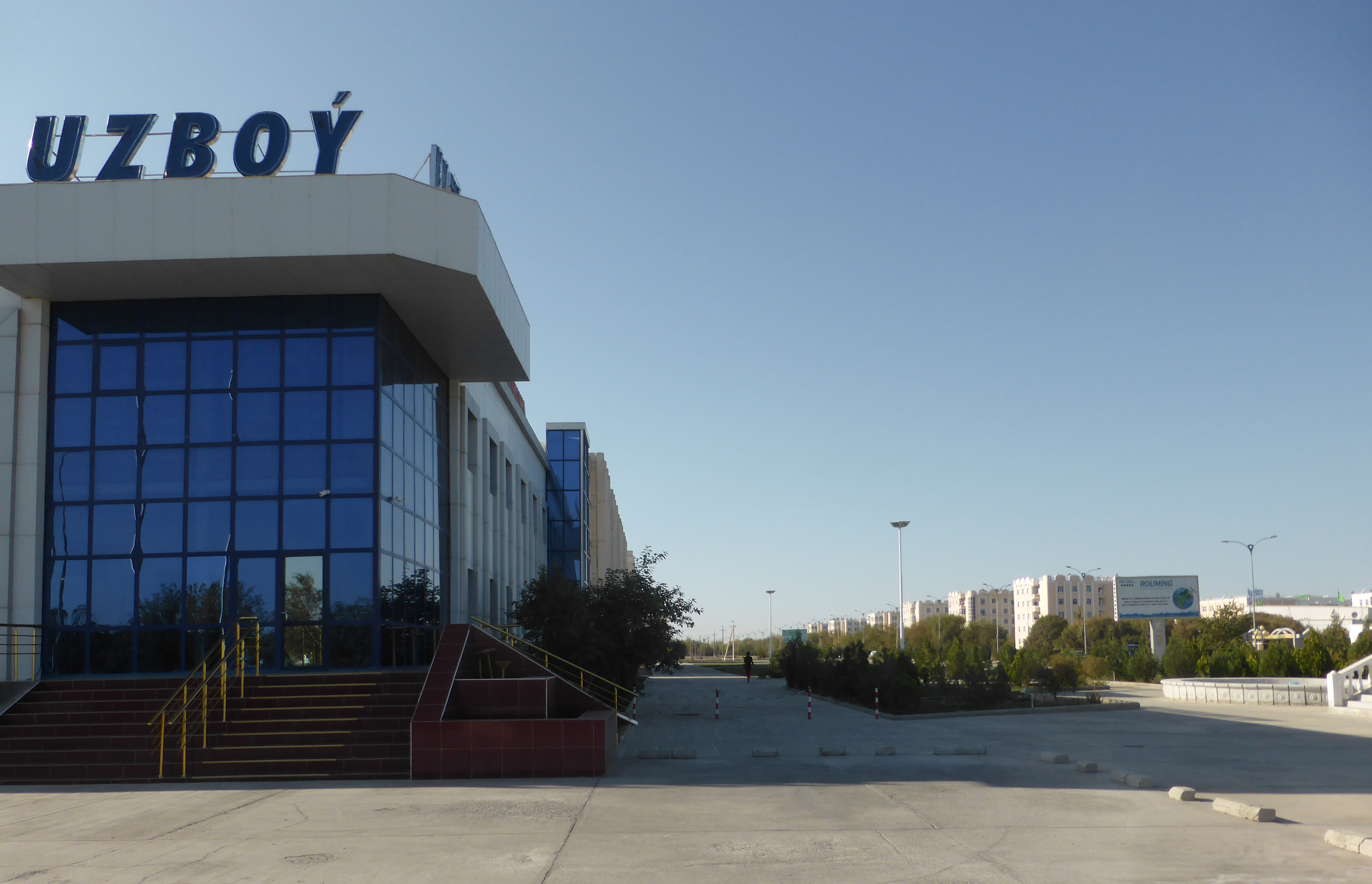

- Location in Turkmenistan
- Coordinates: 41°50′N 59°58′E
- Country: Turkmenistan
- Province: Daşoguz Province

Government
  - Mayor: Mammetnyyaz Owezovich Nurmammedov

Area
  - Total: 160.6 km^{2} (62.0 sq mi)
- Elevation: 88 m (289 ft)

Population (2022 census)
  - Total: 201,142
  - Density: 1,252/km^{2} (3,244/sq mi)
- Time zone: UTC+5

Daşoguz (Turkmen pronunciation: [ˌdɑːʃoˈʁuːð]), formerly known as Tashauz (Russian: Ташауз [təʂɐˈus]) until 1992 and Dashkhovuz (Russian: Дашховуз [dəʂxɐˈvus]) until 1999, is a city in northern Turkmenistan and the capital of Daşoguz Province. The border with Uzbekistan is about 10 kilometres (6.2 mi) away.

== Geography ==
It is located at latitude 41.833° north, longitude 59.9667° east, at an average of 88 meters above sea level. It is about 76.7 km (47.7 mi) from Nukus, Uzbekistan, and 460 km (290 mi) from Ashgabat. In nearby Lake Sarykamysh 65 varieties of fish can be found.

=== Climate ===
Daşoguz has a cold desert climate (BWk, according to the Köppen climate classification), with long and hot summers. Winters are relatively short, but quite cold. The precipitation is scarce throughout the year, with an average of 100 mm (3.93 in).

Climate data for Daşoguz
Month	Jan	Feb	Mar	Apr	May	Jun	Jul	Aug	Sep	Oct	Nov	Dec	Year
Mean daily maximum °C (°F)	0.8 (33.4)	3.7 (38.7)	11.2 (52.2)	21.2 (70.2)	28.8 (83.8)	33.6 (92.5)	35.6 (96.1)	33.1 (91.6)	27.3 (81.1)	18.6 (65.5)	10.4 (50.7)	3.2 (37.8)	19.0 (66.1)
Daily mean °C (°F)	−3.6 (25.5)	−1.5 (29.3)	5.4 (41.7)	14.5 (58.1)	21.5 (70.7)	26.0 (78.8)	28.3 (82.9)	25.7 (78.3)	19.6 (67.3)	11.7 (53.1)	5.0 (41.0)	1.1 (34.0)	12.8 (55.1)
Mean daily minimum °C (°F)	−8.0 (17.6)	−6.7 (19.9)	−0.4 (31.3)	7.8 (46.0)	14.2 (57.6)	18.5 (65.3)	21.0 (69.8)	18.3 (64.9)	12.0 (53.6)	4.8 (40.6)	−0.3 (31.5)	−1.0 (30.2)	6.7 (44.0)
Average precipitation mm (inches)	8 (0.3)	8 (0.3)	17 (0.7)	18 (0.7)	12 (0.5)	4 (0.2)	2 (0.1)	1 (0.0)	2 (0.1)	6 (0.2)	10 (0.4)	12 (0.5)	100 (4)
Source: Climate-data.org

== History ==
Founded as a fort called Tashauz in the early 19th century by the Russians, the name was changed to the Turkmen form Dashkhovuz in 1992 after independence, and to Daşoguz by order of President Niyazov in 1999; the modern city has all characteristics of Soviet planning. The etymology remains disputed.

On September 5, 1998, a H5 meteorite weighing approximately seven kilograms fell in Daşoguz.

== City ==
Along the middle of the town runs the Saparmurat Turkmenbashy Shayoly, formerly Andalyp Shayoly in honor of Andalyp, a native poet c. 18th century.

A pentad of statues — Oguzhan, Görogly, Gorkut Ata, Tughril, Alp Arslan and Magtymguly Pyragy surrounding a seated Saparmurat Niyazov, who is reading Ruhnama — ornament the town center. Two museums — Museum of Bagshies, commemorating native traditional singers and Glory Museum, commemorating local war heroes — are prominent.

=== Transportation ===
Paul Brummell notes that the town serves as a transportation hub rather than a tourist destination. Daşoguz Airport provides regular flights to Ashgabat, Turkmenbashy, Balkanabat, Mary, and Türkmenabat. At the city's northern edge lies the railway station, from which a daily train operates to and from Ashgabat. Private vehicles are available for transport to all district capitals in the Northern Region, and Ashgabat.

Construction of the 546-kilometer Dashoguz–Ashgabat high-speed highway began in November 2026. The highway, leading to the Oguz Han Fountain Complex in Ashgabat, is divided into distinct sections: the segment from kilometer 546 to 527 and from 48 to 9 features six lanes with a subgrade width of 34 meters; the central segment from kilometer 527 to 48 comprises four lanes with a width of 26.5 meters; and the final approach to the capital (up to kilometer 9) consists of eight lanes spanning 65 meters in width, incorporating pedestrian sidewalks and green belts. Infrastructure along the route includes 136 bus stops, 13 parking areas, seven police traffic control posts, automated speed monitoring and video surveillance systems, as well as nine modernized bridges and a newly built 812-meter two-lane bridge across the Nayzalydepiz lowlands.

In December 2024, a training and service center for KAMAZ vehicle maintenance and repair opened in Dashoguz. The center offers vehicle washing, parking, spare parts storage, and quick replacement services, along with training facilities and a repair workshop.

== Demographics ==
Daşoguz's population of 166,500 (1999 census estimate) is predominantly Turkmen, Uzbek and Kazakhs with smaller numbers of Russians, Koreans, Karakalpaks, and Tatars present. A large number of those forcefully displaced by ex-President for Life Saparmurat Niyazov have been resettled in lands adjoining the town.

=== Notable people ===
- Yagshygeldi Kakayev (1959–2020) - politician and petroleum engineer

== Education ==
Daşoguz serves as an educational center for the northern region of Turkmenistan, hosting institutions of higher education, vocational schools, and specialized secondary institutions.

=== Higher education ===
- Turkmen Agricultural Institute — established in 2010, it is the primary university in the Daşoguz Region. The institute prepares specialists for the agricultural sector across three main faculties: agronomy, veterinary medicine, and hydromelioration and agricultural mechanization.

=== Vocational and specialized education ===
The city is home to several specialized secondary and vocational schools:

- Beki Seytakov Pedagogical School — trains primary school and preschool educators.
- Gurbansoltan Eje Medical School — prepares mid-level healthcare professionals, nurses, and medical assistants.
- Dashoguz Agro-Industrial Secondary Vocational School — provides technical training specialized in regional agricultural machinery and land management.

=== Primary and secondary education ===
Daşoguz has a public school network consisting of general secondary schools, specialized institutions focusing on foreign languages and natural sciences, as well as specialized art and music secondary schools.

== Sport ==
The town has two stadiums: Sport Toplumy Stadium and Garaşsyzlyk Stadium.
