= Türkmenbaşy International Airport =

International airport in Türkmenbaşy, Balkan Province, Turkmenistan

Türkmenbaşy International Airport Türkmenbaşy halkara howa menzili
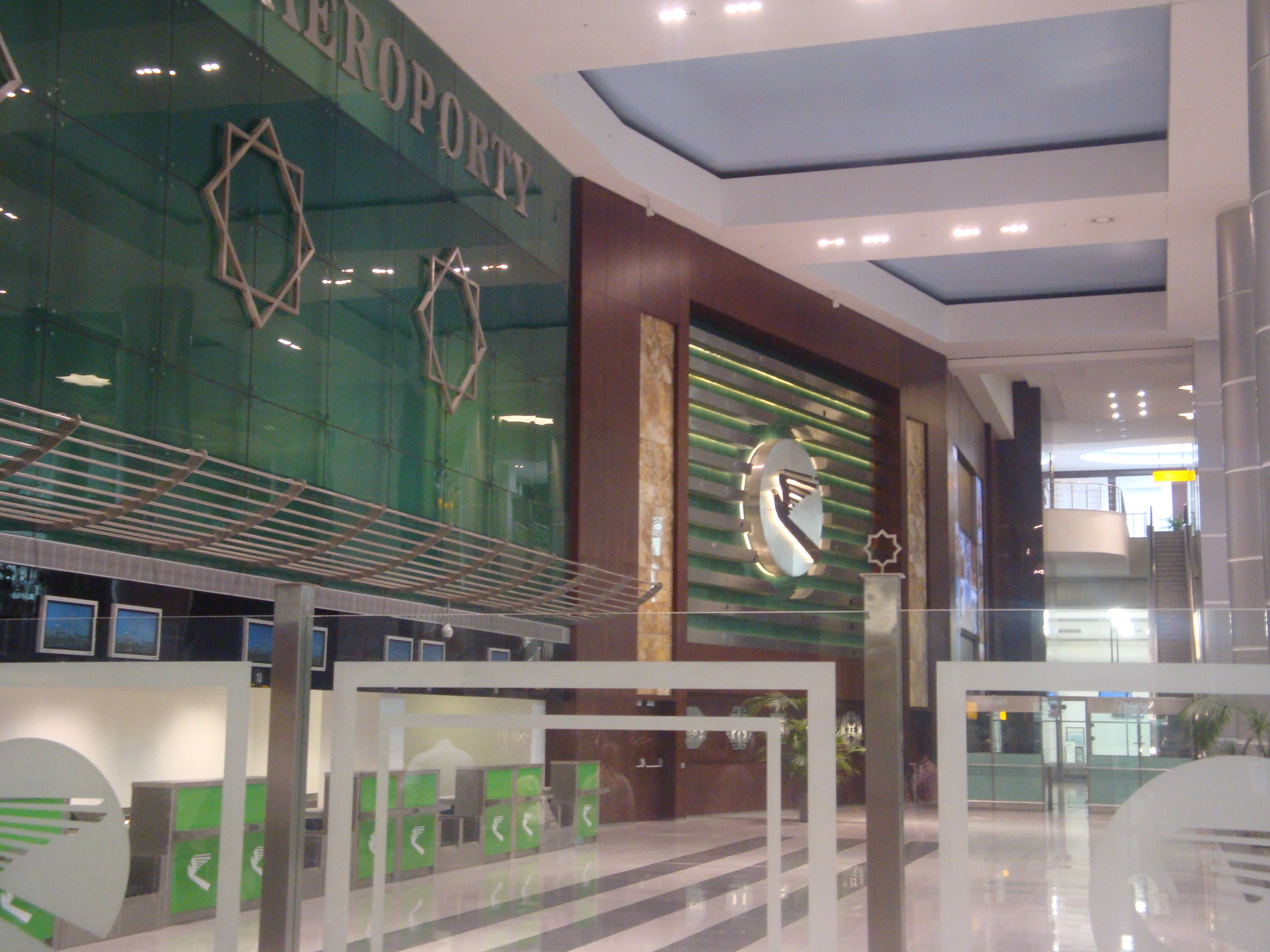
- IATA: KRW; ICAO: UTAK

Summary
- Airport type: Public
- Operator: Turkmenhowayollary State Service
- Serves: Türkmenbaşy, Awaza, Garabogaz
- Location: Türkmenbaşy, Balkan Region, Turkmenistan
- Focus city for: Turkmenistan Airlines
- Elevation AMSL: 283 ft (86 m)
- Coordinates: 40°03′48″N 053°00′26″E
- Website: turkmenbashiairport.gov.tm

Map
- Location of the airport in Turkmenistan

Runways
Direction	Length		Surface
Direction	ft	m	Surface
16R/34L	11,483	3,500	Concrete
16L/34R	8,202	2,500	Concrete
- Source: AIP Turkmenistan

Türkmenbaşy International Airport (Turkmen: Türkmenbaşy halkara howa menzili) (IATA: KRW, ICAO: UTAK), formerly Krasnovodsk Airport, is an international airport located in the city of Türkmenbaşy, on the coast of the Caspian Sea in the Balkan Region, Turkmenistan. It accepts both passenger and cargo flights. It opened in 1959 and is one of the seven international airports in Turkmenistan. The airport plays a major role in Turkmenistan's tourism industry, as Awaza is a popular resort destination.

== History ==
The airport was constructed in the 1950s and was an interceptor aircraft facility for the Soviet Air Force. It initially operated the Sukhoi Su-9 (Fishpot) in the 1960s and 1970s. The regiment replaced it in 1978 with the MiG-23M (Flogger-B). In the 1990s, the Turkmen Air Force took over operation of the military base.

=== Development since the 2000s ===
In December 2007, the State National Service Turkmenhowayollary signed a contract with Polimeks to design and build a new airport in Türkmenbaşy. The Turkish company was to reconstruct the existing airport, build a 3.5 km runway, aircraft parking, and a centralized fueling station. Construction began in February 2008.

On April 12, 2010, the new Turkmenbashi International Airport received its first four international flights. The airport features a four-story terminal, a 61-meter control tower equipped by Siemens and Thales, and a VIP facility. It can handle 800 passengers per hour, service 14 aircraft, and accommodate 7 flights at once, meeting international standards.

In 2010, a 22-kilometer motorway was opened, connecting Türkmenbaşy International Airport, located on the Krasnovodsk Peninsula, with Awaza. The Türkmenbaşy International Airport – Awaza motorway is designed for three lanes of traffic in both directions, with a 5-meter-wide median strip. It is equipped with modern road signs, parking bays, and an electronic traffic safety monitoring system. Convenient entrances and exits are provided at junctions, and terrain irregularities are overcome using two-level arched overpasses.

Until 2011, the airfield had the main runway 16/34. The airfield was capable of receiving aircraft of most types, including An-225, An-124 and Il-76 (with partial load), An-22, Tu-154, Boeing-757 and all lighter ones, as well as helicopters of all types. In 2011, the construction of a new runway 16R/34L was completed, its classification number (PCN) is 70/R/A/X/T, dimensions are 3500 × 45 m (cement concrete). The commissioning of the new runway allows the airport to receive aircraft of all types.

Since October 2022, Belavia has been operating regular flights on the Minsk–Türkmenbaşy route.

Starting May 19, 2025, Turkmenistan Airlines temporarily suspends flights connecting Turkmenbashi with Ashgabat, Turkmenabat, Mary, and Dashoguz. Routes redirected to Balkanabat International Airport.

In summer 2025, Turkmenbashi International Airport underwent major modernization in preparation for the 3rd UN Conference on Landlocked Developing Countries in Awaza. Arrival and departure halls were upgraded, passport and customs control points were modernized, and new digital systems were introduced. The airport's technical fleet was expanded with modern equipment, the runway was improved, and services were enhanced to meet international standards. The modernized international airport was put into operation on July 30, 2025. In August 2025, the airport began actively accepting flights, and within a month, regular flights to Ashgabat and Minsk were restored.

== Facilities ==
=== Passenger terminal ===
In April 2010, a new four-story terminal building was opened with a capacity of 800 passengers per hour. In addition to this, a new control tower was put into operation. The airport can now take 7 flights simultaneously while providing international standards of service. The total area of the plot on which the new terminal is located, is about 80 hectares. The neighborhood is landscaped, planted and decorated with fountains. There are also indoor and outdoor parking areas for more than three hundred and eighty cars. At the opening of the International Airport of Türkmenbaşy it was visited by President of Turkmenistan Gurbanguly Berdimuhamedov.

=== VIP terminal ===
In the immediate vicinity of the main body of the terminal there is a facility to receive VIP-persons. It is used for VIP charter and business aviation, as well as to receive special flights and departure of delegations of the Government of Turkmenistan and guests of city of Türkmenbaşy. The building has all the facilities for meetings and conferences.

=== Cargo terminal ===
In addition to the main terminal there is also an international cargo terminal and a freight transportation service equipped with automated handling.

== Airlines and destinations ==
=== Passenger ===
Airlines	Destinations
Belavia	Minsk
Turkmenistan Airlines	Aşgabat

=== Cargo ===
Airlines	Destinations
Turkmenistan Airlines	Ashgabat, Daşoguz, Mary
Fly Pro	Zaragoza

== Access ==
Passengers can get to the airport by car either from Türkmenbaşy or along the highway from the Avaza resort. There is a free parking in front of the airport.

Turkmenawtoulaglary Agency operates a bus service from airport to Türkmenbaşy city and Türkmenbaşy District.

== See also ==
- List of airports in Turkmenistan
- Ashgabat International Airport
- Balkanabat International Airport
- Türkmenbaşy International Seaport
