= Turkmenistan Airlines =

Flag carrier of Turkmenistan

OJSC Turkmenistan Airlines «Türkmenistan» awiakompaniýasy

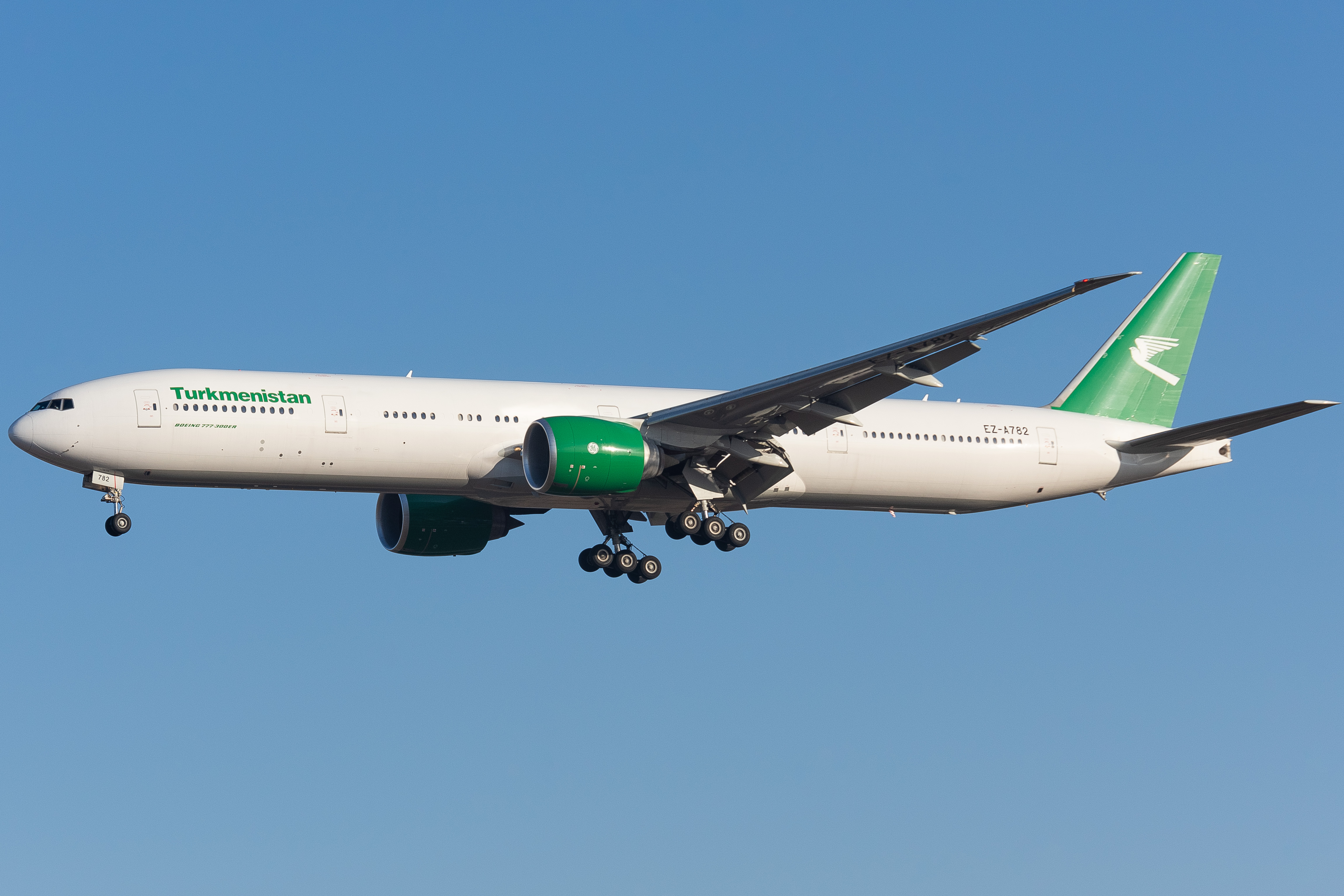
- Turkmenistan Airlines Boeing 777-300ER in standard livery
IATA	ICAO	Call sign
T5	TUA	TURKMENISTAN
- Founded: 4 May 1992; 34 years ago
- Hubs: Ashgabat
- Focus cities: Turkmenabat; Turkmenbashi
- Fleet size: 25
- Destinations: 19
- Parent company: Government of Turkmenistan
- Headquarters: Ashgabat, Turkmenistan
- Key people: Dovran Saburov, CEO
- Website: www.turkmenistanairlines.tm

Turkmenistan Airlines (Turkmen: Türkmenistan awiakompaniýasy açyk görnüşli paýdarlar jemgyýeti, commonly known as Türkmenhowaýollary) is the flag carrier and only airline of Turkmenistan, headquartered in Ashgabat. An open joint-stock company, it operates domestic and international passenger and cargo services mainly from its hub at Ashgabat International Airport.

== History ==
The state-owned service Turkmenistan Airlines was founded on 4 May 1992. In 1992, Turkmenistan Airlines became the first airline in the former Soviet Union to purchase a Boeing 737-300. In April 1993, Turkmenistan became a full member of the International Civil Aviation Organization (ICAO). The first flight on a cargo aircraft IL-76 was completed on 19 April 1993 from Ashgabat to Brest, Belarus.

From 2001, the airline phased out its Soviet-era fleet for a more modern fleet of Boeing 717s, which were extensively used for service on domestic routes until their retirement. Seven of the 717 series were purchased; the first was presented at the MAKS air show in 2001. On 29 April 2009, a Boeing 737-700 was demonstrated in Ashgabat and on 2 September, Boeing announced that Turkmenistan Airlines had confirmed an order for three more such aircraft worth $192 million. In May 2009, the airline opened the Lachyn (Turkmen: Laçyn) Hotel in Ashgabat for transit passengers. Designed for 200 guests, it is located on Bitarap Türkmenistan şaýoly, which connects the city center to the Ashgabat Airport. On 1 July 2011, the airline began to operate an electronic ticket system on all flights. Booking flights can be carried out in the standard way, but information about air travel began to be given out in the form of a passenger itinerary receipt.

On 8 May 2013, a Boeing 737-800 was delivered. On 3 June 2013, a fourth Boeing 737-800 arrived, and on 18 December 2013, a fifth Boeing 737-800 arrived.

In 2012, the airline began printing the full-colour magazine Lachyn ("Falcon"). This was the first in-flight product in Turkmenistan. The magazine is also distributed in the halls for official delegations and VIP-zones of airports in Turkmenistan. In the same year, the airline carried 57,500 passengers to 15 international destinations and approx. 90,000 passengers on domestic routes per month (c. 1.77 million passengers per year).

In January 2013, regular cargo flights to Brno commenced. In March 2013, a new ticket sales centre was opened at 61 Atatürk Street. This building houses 30 sales offices; 17 for domestic flights and 13 for international routes. In August 2013 a regular passenger flight to Lviv was started. In October of the same year, flights to Donetsk and Riga commenced followed in December by the first scheduled service to Western Europe - Paris. In March 2014, Turkmenistan Airlines announced that it was to commence long-haul flights using its newly acquired Boeing 777-200LRs. The aircraft were utilized on flights to Bangkok, Beijing, Birmingham, Delhi and Istanbul.

=== Re-organization ===
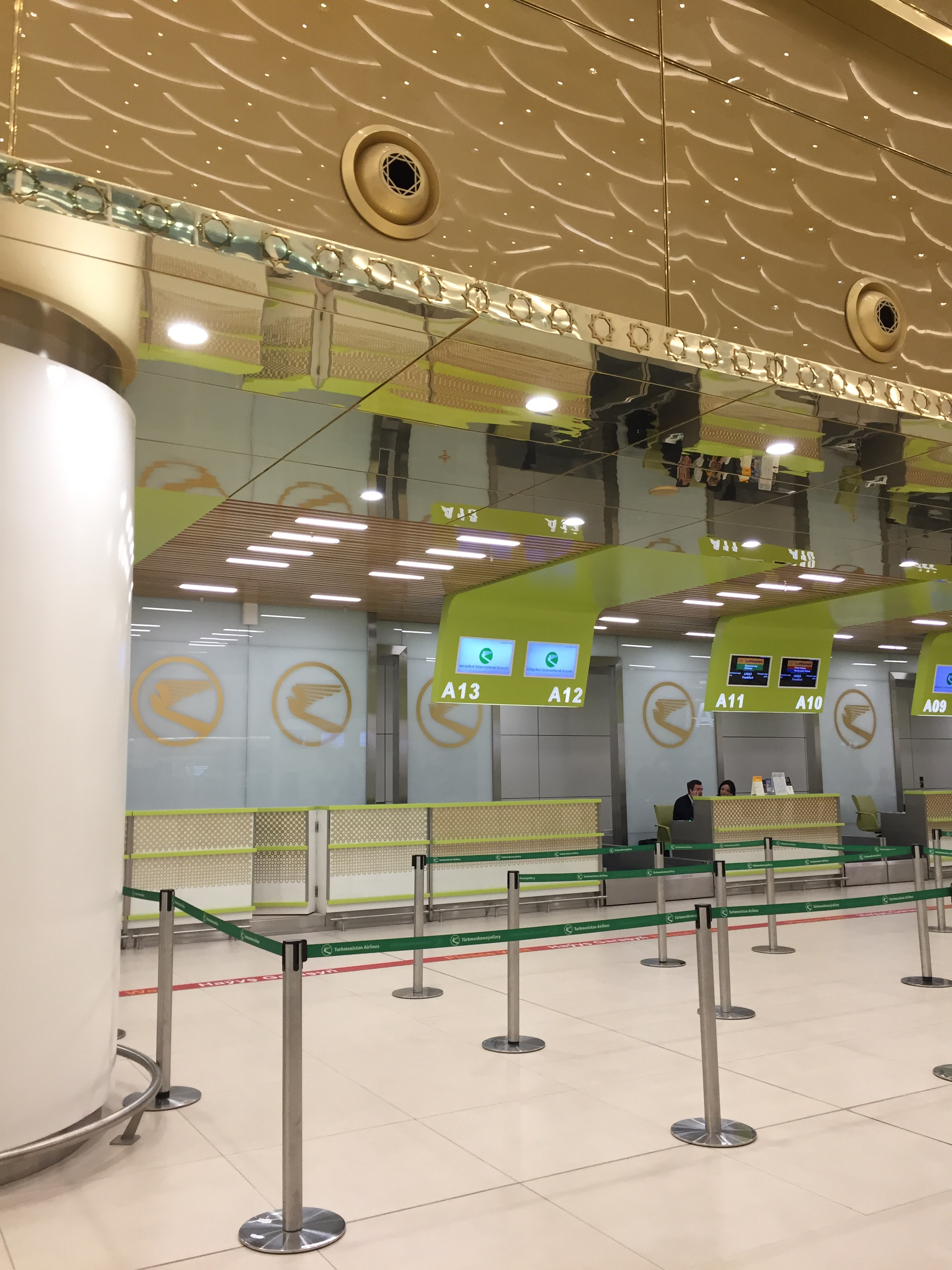
Airline check-in counters at Aşgabat International Airport

In 2017, the air transport enterprise of the State National Service Türkmenhowaýollary was transformed into the joint-stock company Turkmenistan Airlines.

In 2019, Turkmenistan Airlines officially opened ticket sales on its newly launched website.

On 4 February 2019, the European Aviation Safety Agency (EASA) suspended Turkmenistan Airlines' permission to fly in the EU. This forced the airline to terminate its routes to the United Kingdom, France and Germany. In December, Turkmenistan Airlines resumed regular passenger traffic to European Union countries after a 10-month break.

In connection with the COVID-19 pandemic and for the safety of passengers, Turkmenistan Airlines suspended all international regular passenger flights in March 2020. In order to prevent the import and spread of coronavirus infection, all planes arriving in Turkmenistan from abroad are redirected to the Turkmenabat International Airport or Turkmenbashi International Airport.

Since March 2021, Turkmenistan Airlines switched to the new Piece Concept baggage system.

In May 2022, Turkmenistan Airlines announced the resumption of flights to Dubai, the popular UAE tourist destination as the travel industry starts recovering from the COVID-19 impact. In 2022, regular passenger flights to Istanbul, Kazan, Moscow, Dubai, Frankfurt and Abu Dhabi were resumed. Aircraft began to return to Ashgabat (during the pandemic, they were redirected to Turkmenabat and Turkmenbashi).

In February 2023, the airline launched a stopover service on domestic flights, which involves a flight with a long transfer, when the air carrier offers to spend transit time not at the airport, but in the city next to which the airport is located.

In spring 2023, the airline purchased for the first time two cargo aircraft of the Airbus A330-200P2F type. It was the first of its type to be used in Central Asia. New cargo flights on airplanes Airbus A330-200P2F was opened to Incheon, Hanoi, Milan, Shenzhen and Xi'an.

The first of Turkmenistan Airlines Boeing 777-300ER aircraft (368-seat, three-class configuration) entered service in December 2023, initially linking Ashgabat with Bangkok. The Boeing 777-300ER aircraft have replaced the retired Boeing 757-200s. The Boeing 777-300ER aircraft are generally used on Turkmenistan Airlines Far East destinations, to London and Bangkok.

As of December 2023, Turkmenistan Airlines was maintaining services to Russia, Germany, UAE, China, Turkey, Thailand, and the UK.

In January 2024, Turkmenistan Airlines confirmed Milan, Ho Chi Minh City, Jeddah and Kuala Lumpur as one of its new destinations for 2024.

Starting December 2024, Turkmenistan Airlines offers free AdonisOne in-flight entertainment on international flights aboard their aircraft. Passengers can enjoy movies, audiobooks, music and magazines. Passengers can connect to the onboard Wi-Fi network using their devices in flight mode. The platform supports multiple languages and offers a wide variety of content to suit all tastes.

In May 2025, Turkmenistan Airlines resumed services to Balkanabat. In July 2025, services began to Seoul.

In 2025, Turkmenistan Airlines carried 2.2 million passengers and 45,000 tonnes of cargo.

== Destinations ==
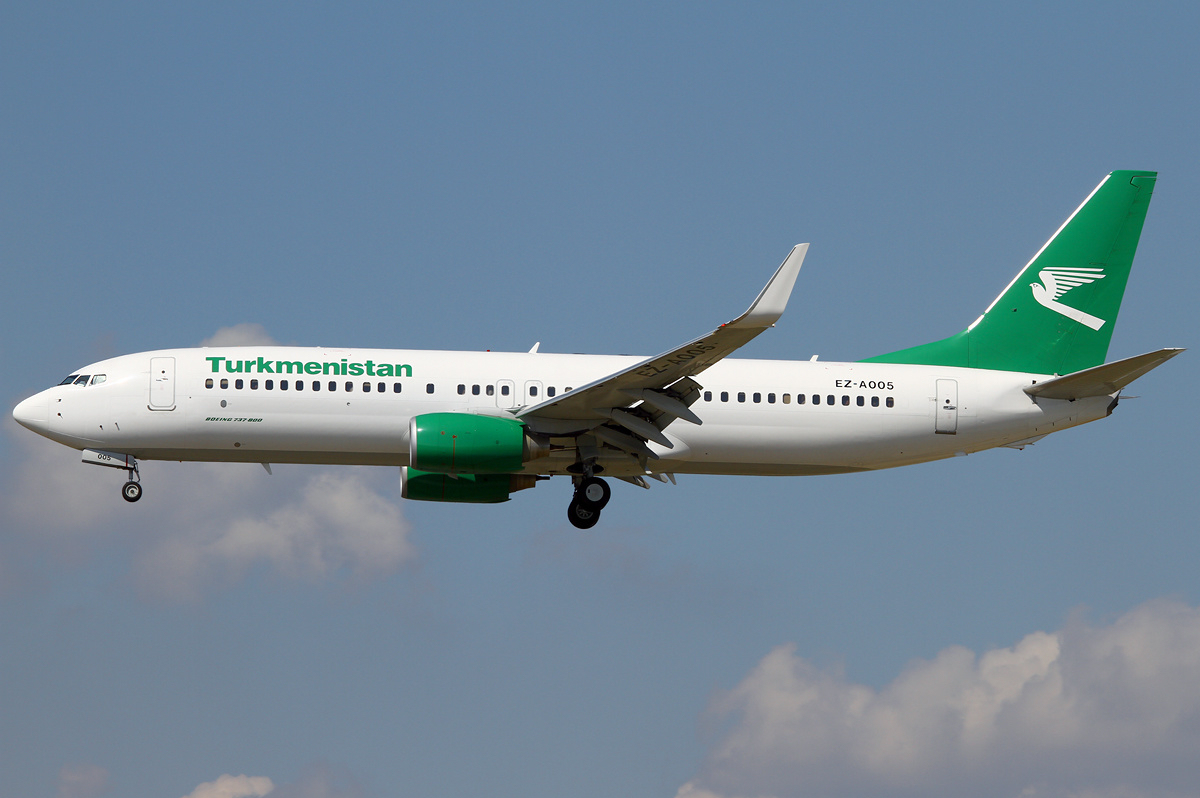
Boeing 737-800

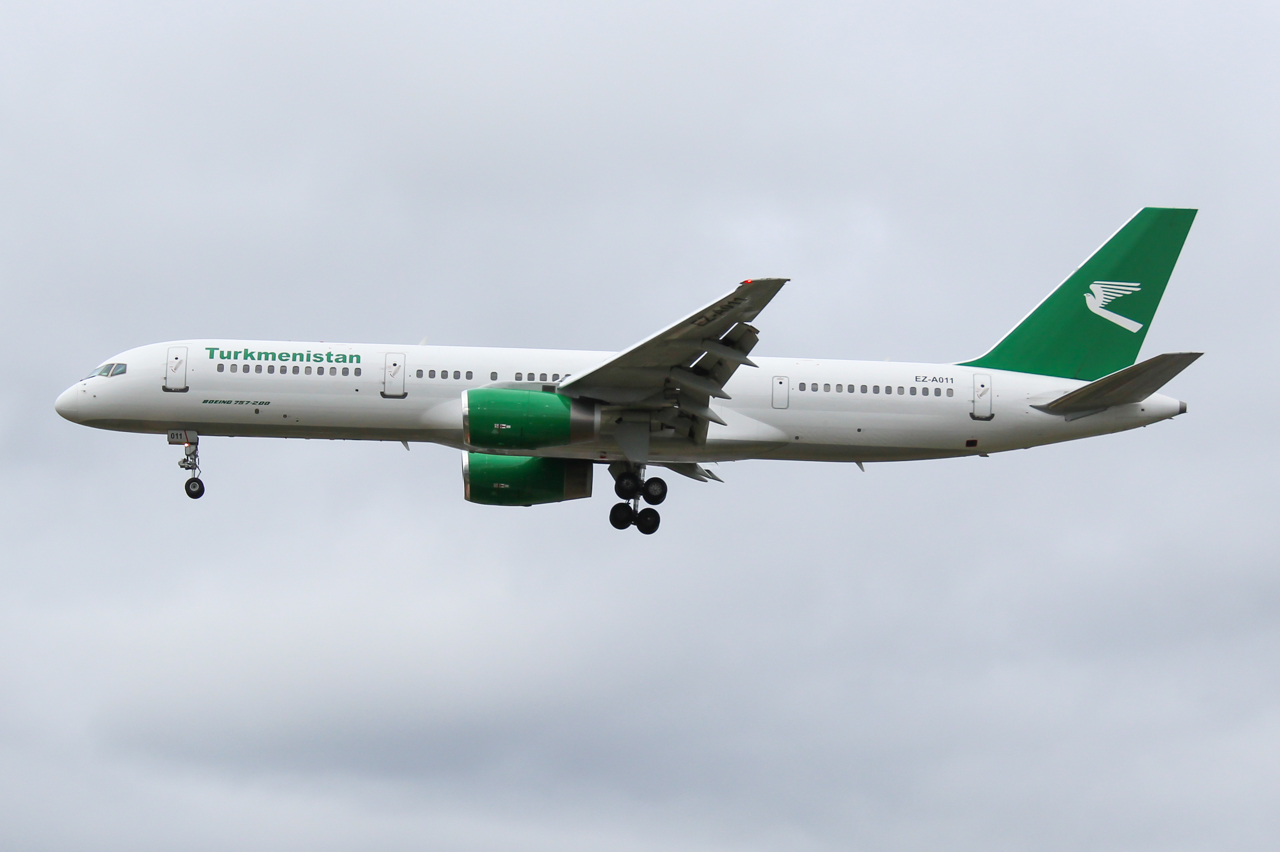
Boeing 757-200

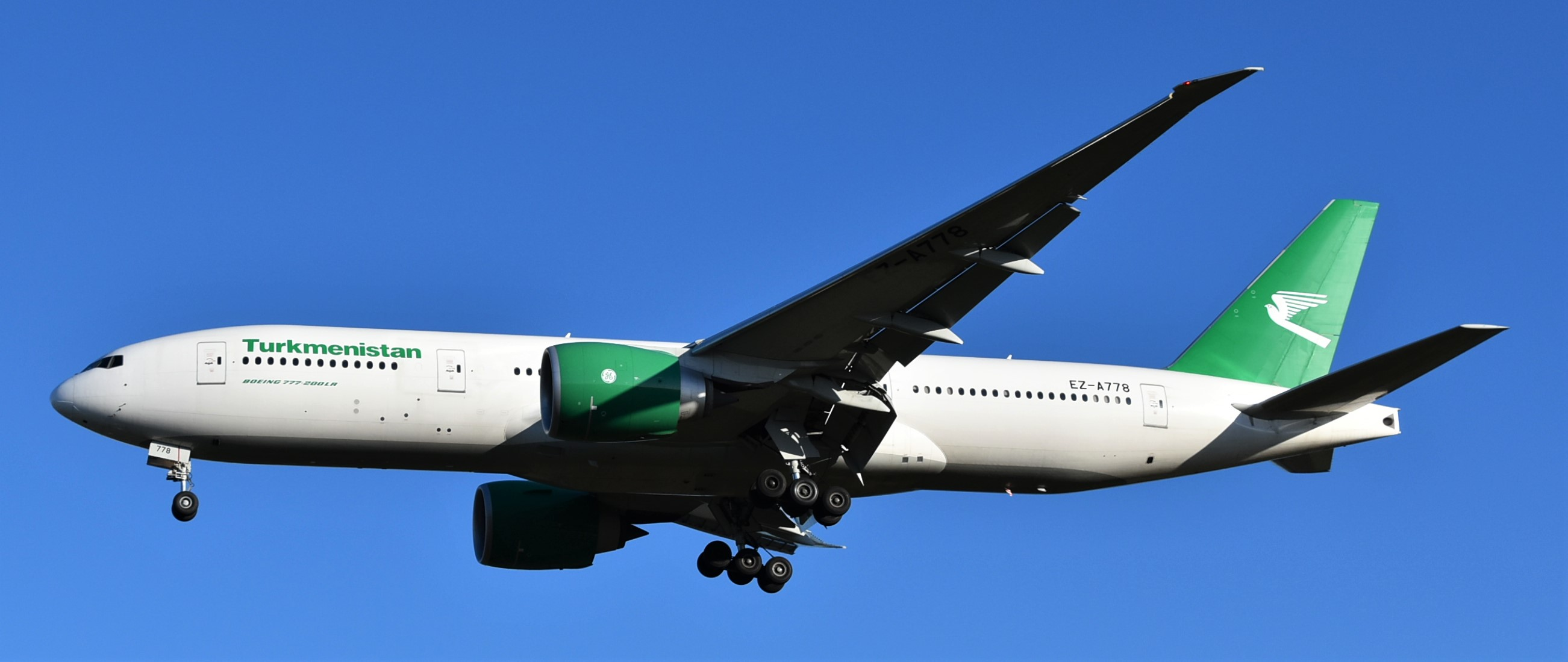
Boeing 777-200LR

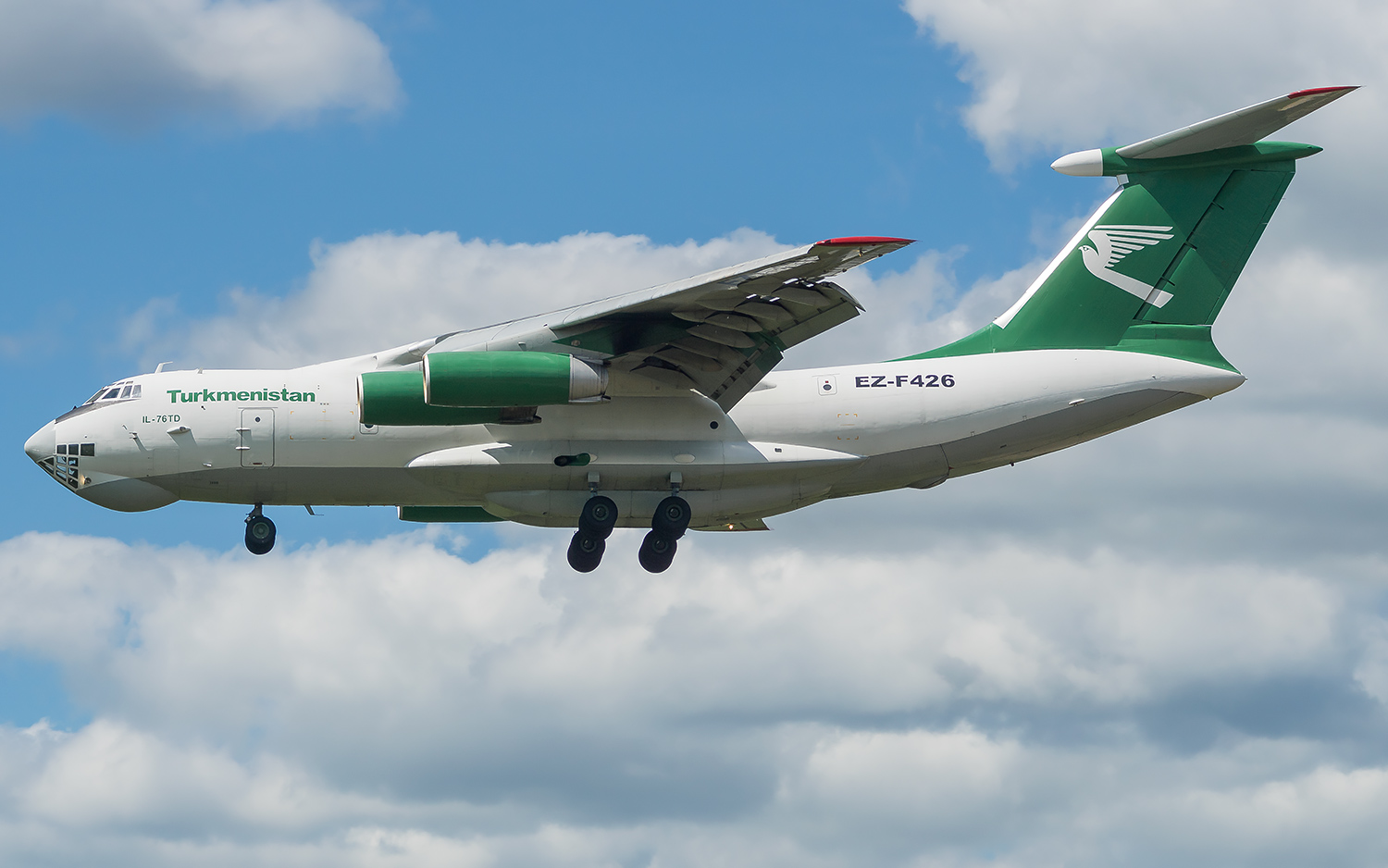
Ilyushin Il-76TD

As of July 2025, Turkmenistan Airlines operates flights to 5 domestic destinations from its hub at Ashgabat International Airport and 14 international destinations in 13 countries. The airline also operates dedicated cargo flights.

=== Interline agreements ===
Turkmenistan Airlines has interline agreements with the following airlines:

- Belavia
- Coyne Airways
- Hahn Air Systems GmbH
- S7 Airlines

== Fleet ==
=== Current fleet ===
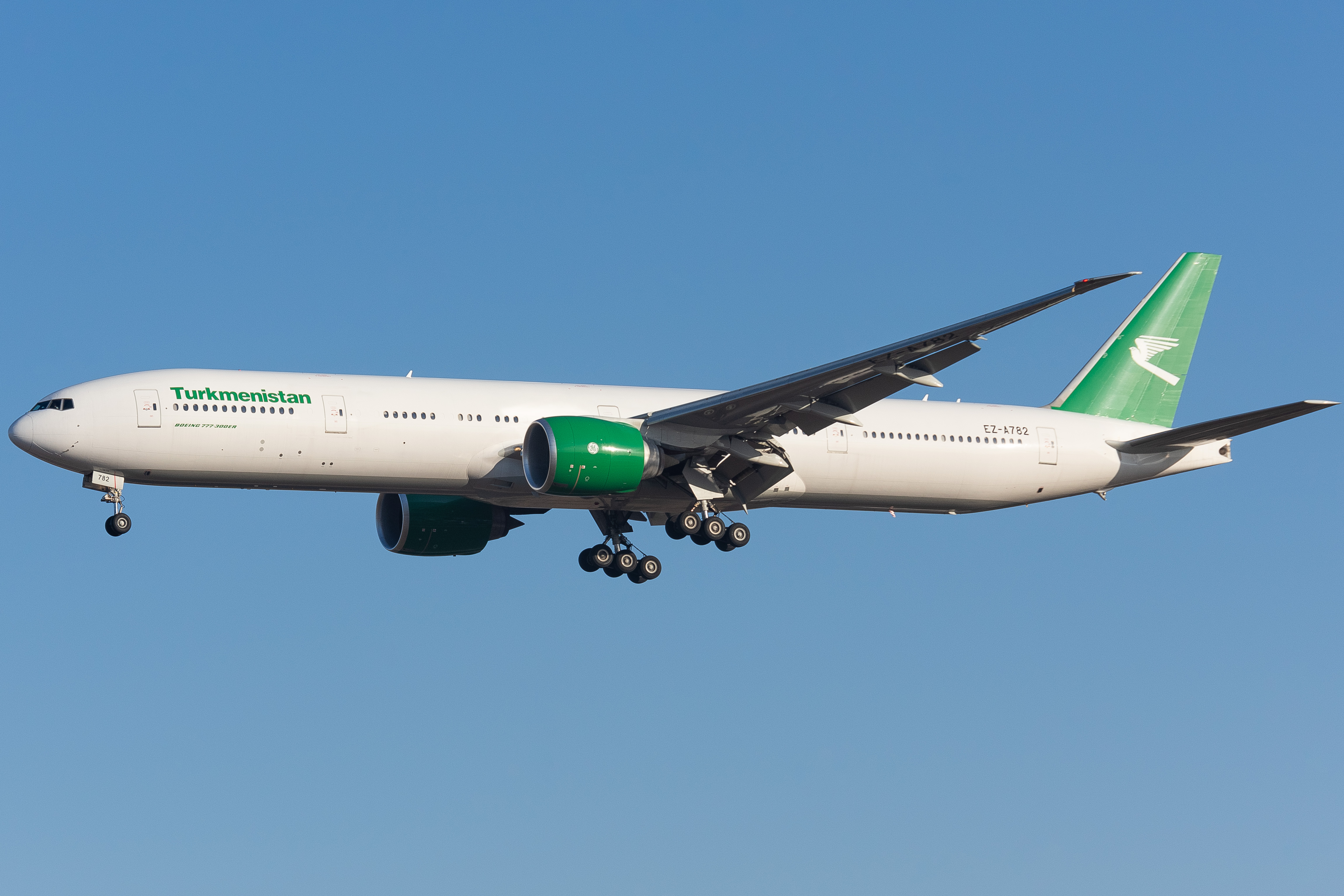
Boeing 777-300ER at Beijing Capital International Airport

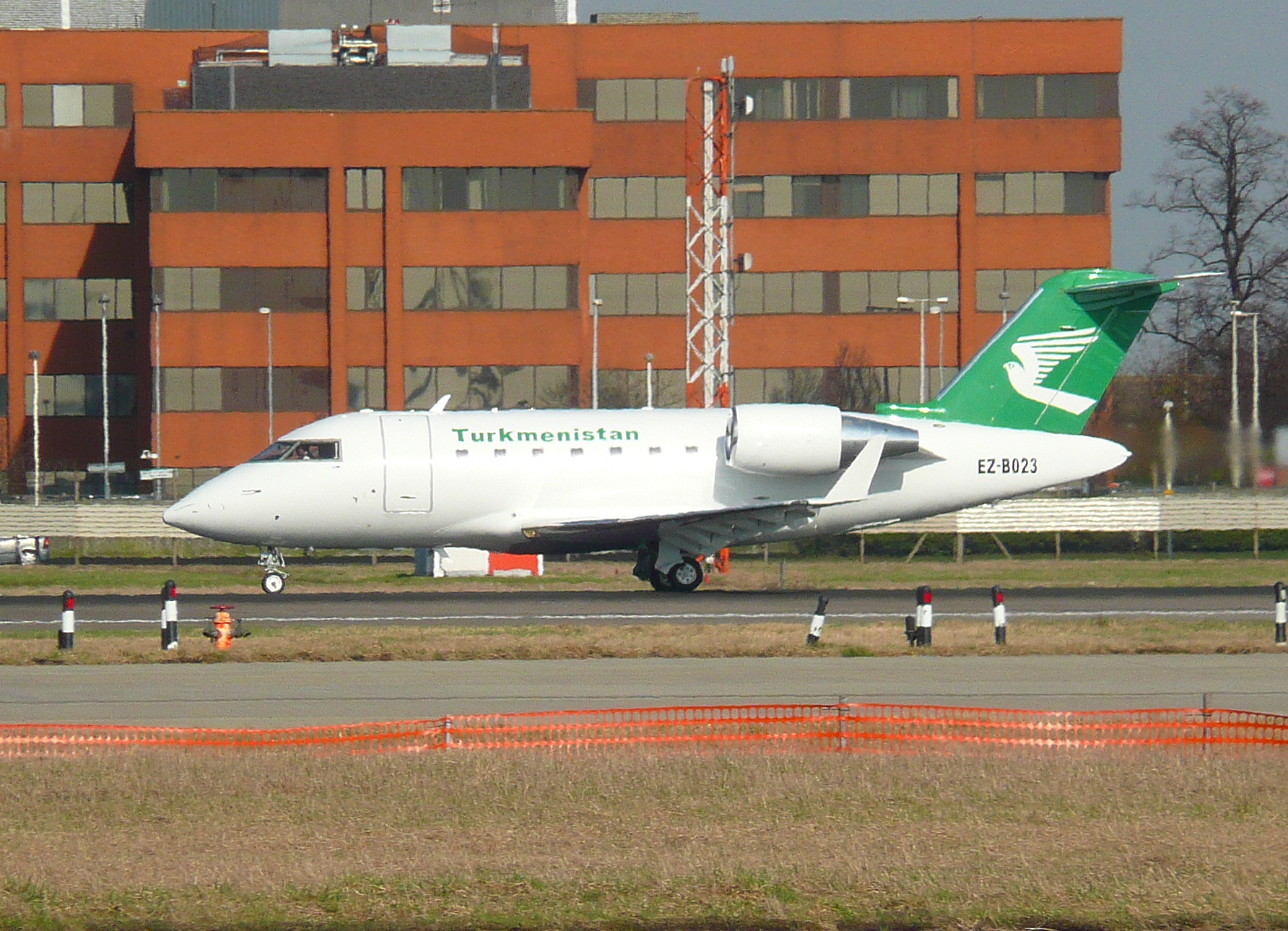
Bombardier Challenger 605

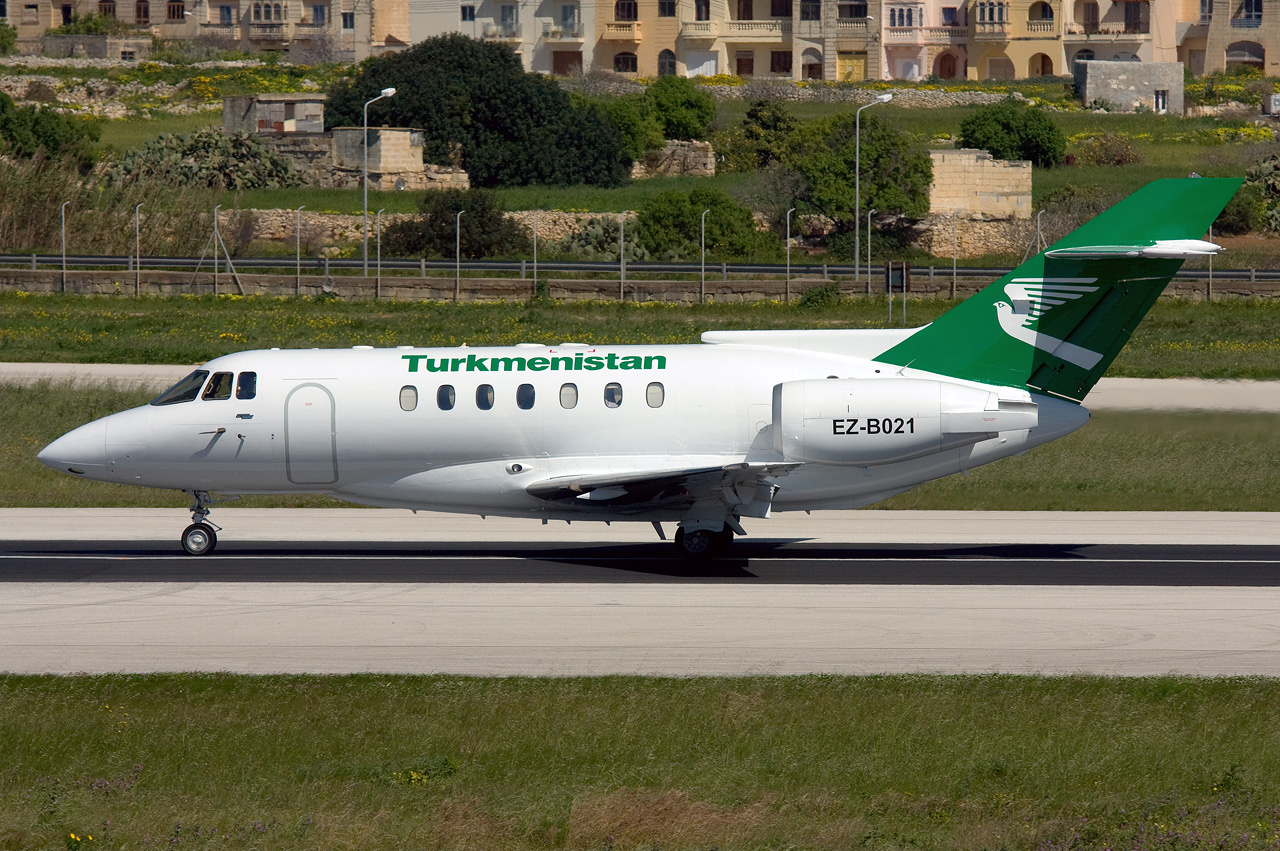
British Aerospace BAe-125-1000B

As of February 2025, Turkmenistan Airlines operates an all-Boeing passenger fleet. The full fleet, which also includes VIP and cargo aircraft, consists of the following aircraft:

Turkmenistan Airlines fleet
Aircraft	In service	Orders	Passengers				Notes
Aircraft	In service	Orders	J	W	Y	Total	Notes
Boeing 737-700	4	—	8	—	118	126	
Boeing 737-700	4	—	—	—	149	149	
Boeing 737-800	8	—	16	—	144	160	
Boeing 737 MAX 8	—	4	TBA				
Boeing 777-200LR	2	—	28	—	263	291	
Boeing 777-300ER	2	—	40	32	296	368	Acquired from Cathay Pacific.
VIP fleet
Boeing 737-700/BBJ1	1	—	VIP				
Boeing 777-200LR	2	—	VIP				Includes EZ-A780, the last 777-200LR ever built.
Bombardier Global Express	1	—	VIP				
Bombardier CRJ-700	1	—	VIP				
Cargo fleet
Airbus A330-200/P2F	2	—	Cargo				
Ilyushin Il-76	2	—	Cargo				
Total	25	4					

=== Historical fleet ===
Since its inception in 1992, Turkmenistan Airlines has operated many types of aircraft. Historically, Turkmenistan Airlines has operated various aircraft, including the following:

Turkmenistan Airlines retired fleet
Aircraft	Total	Introduced	Retired	Notes
Boeing 717-200	7	2001	2018	
Boeing 737-300	3	1992	2014	One aircraft, EZ-A001, has been preserved at the Turkmenhowayollary Training Center

==== Former Turkmenistan Airlines liveries ====
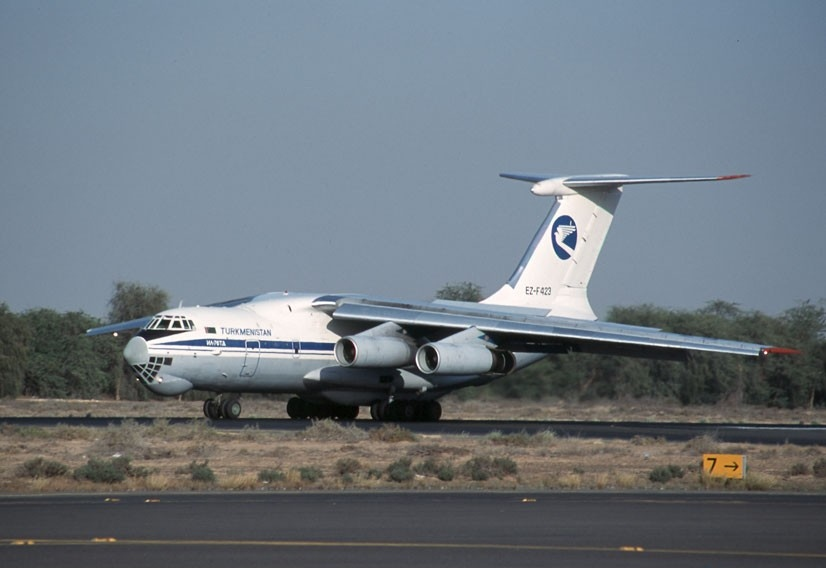
Turkmenistan Airlines Ilyushin Il-76 at Sharjah International Airport

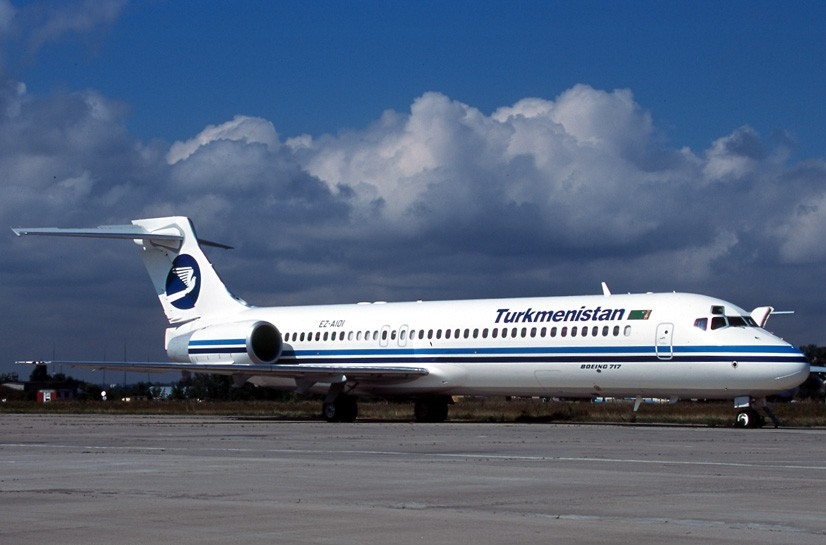
Turkmenistan Airlines Boeing 717 at Ramenskoye Airport

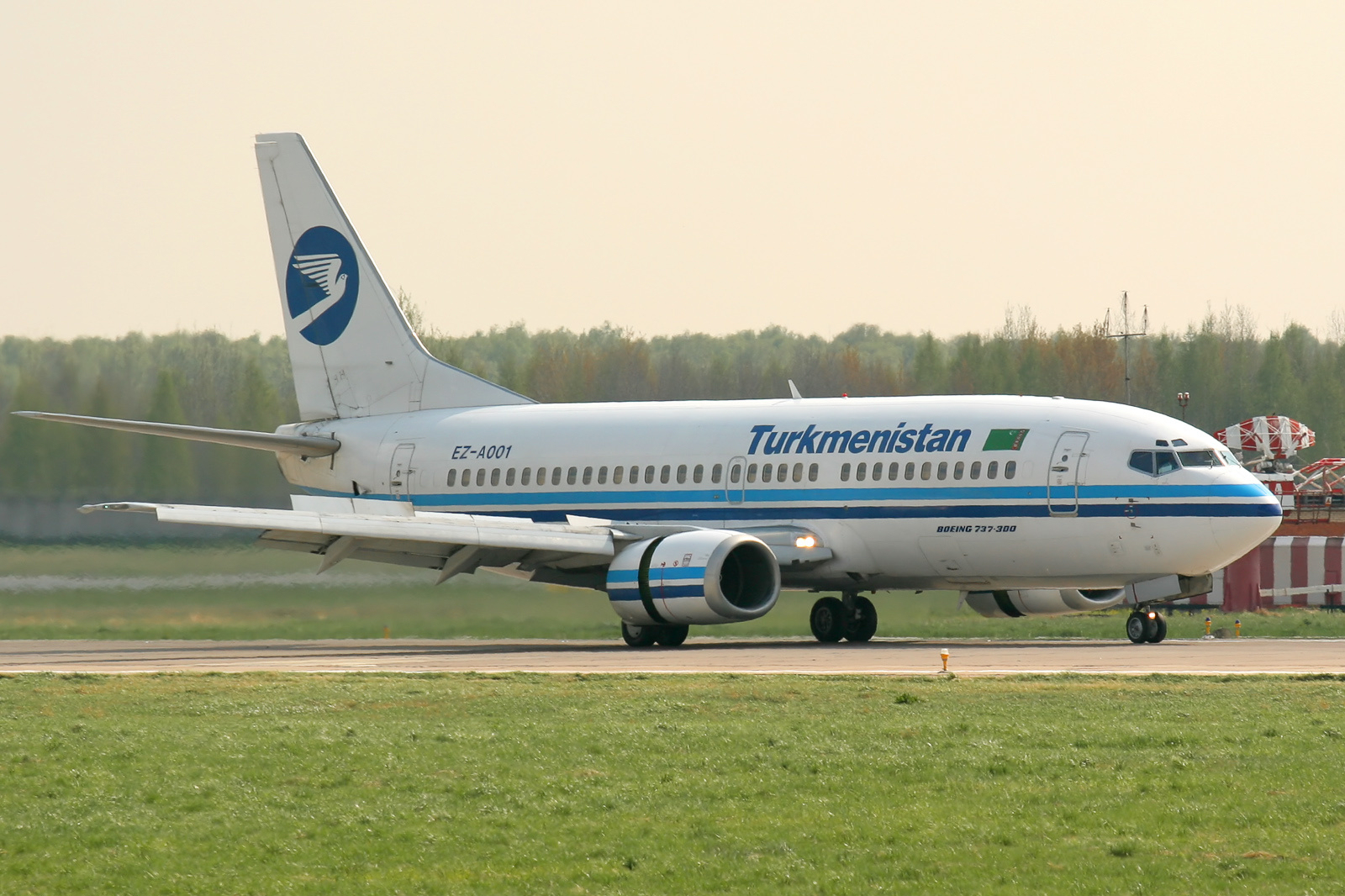
A Boeing 737-300 of Turkmenistan Airlines at Domodedovo International Airport

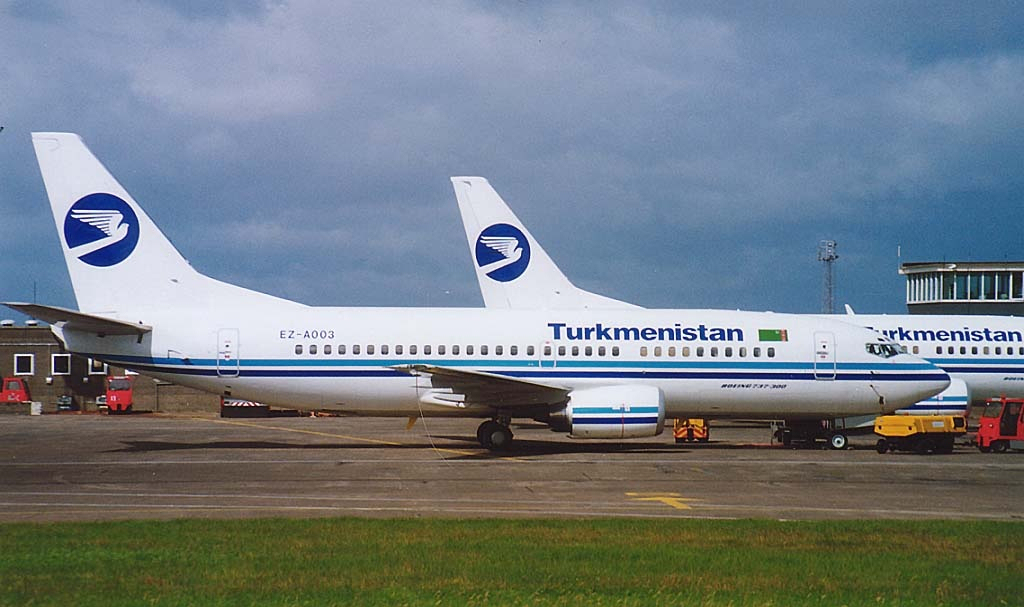
A Boeing 737-300 of Turkmenistan Airlines

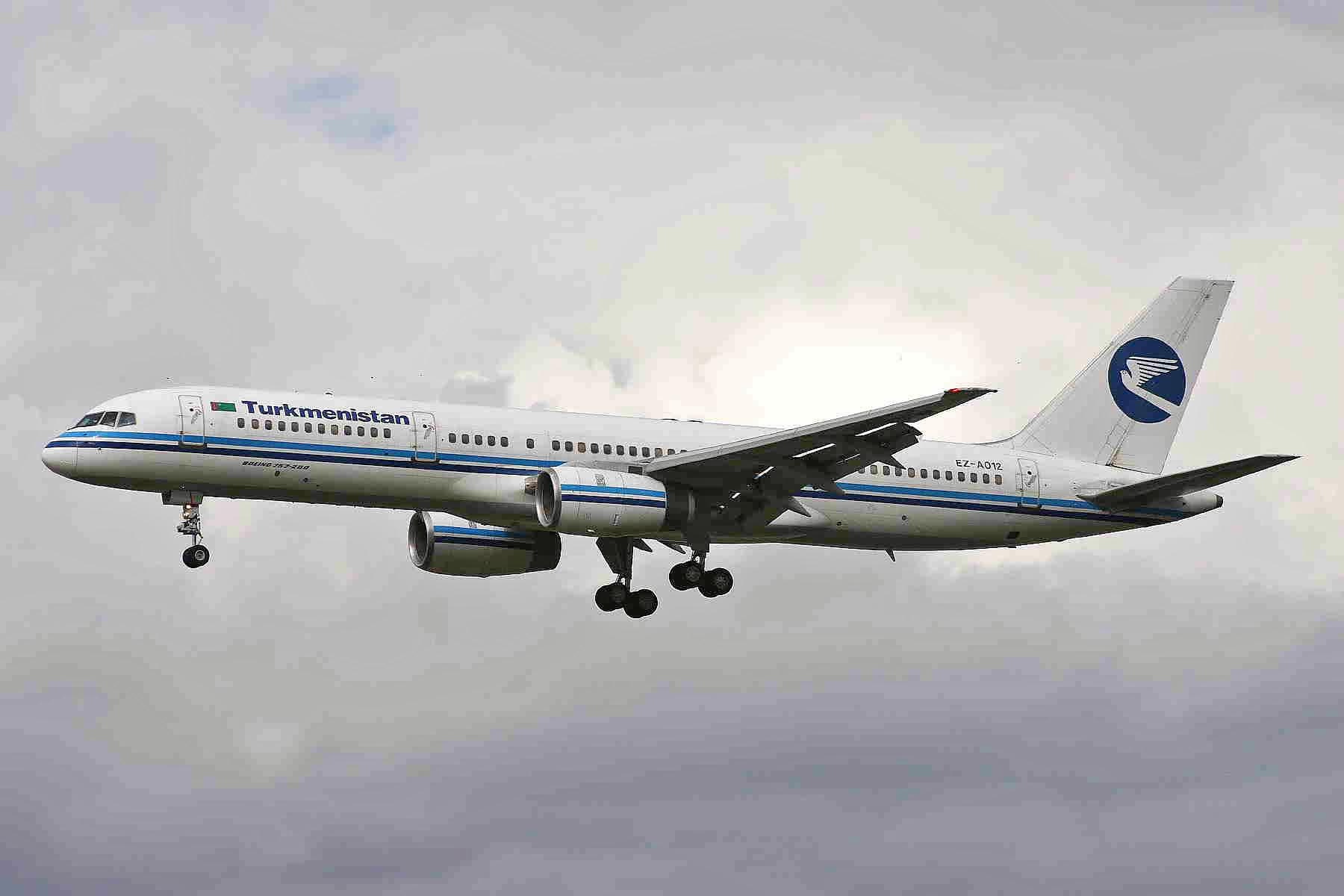
A Boeing 757-200 of Turkmenistan Airlines

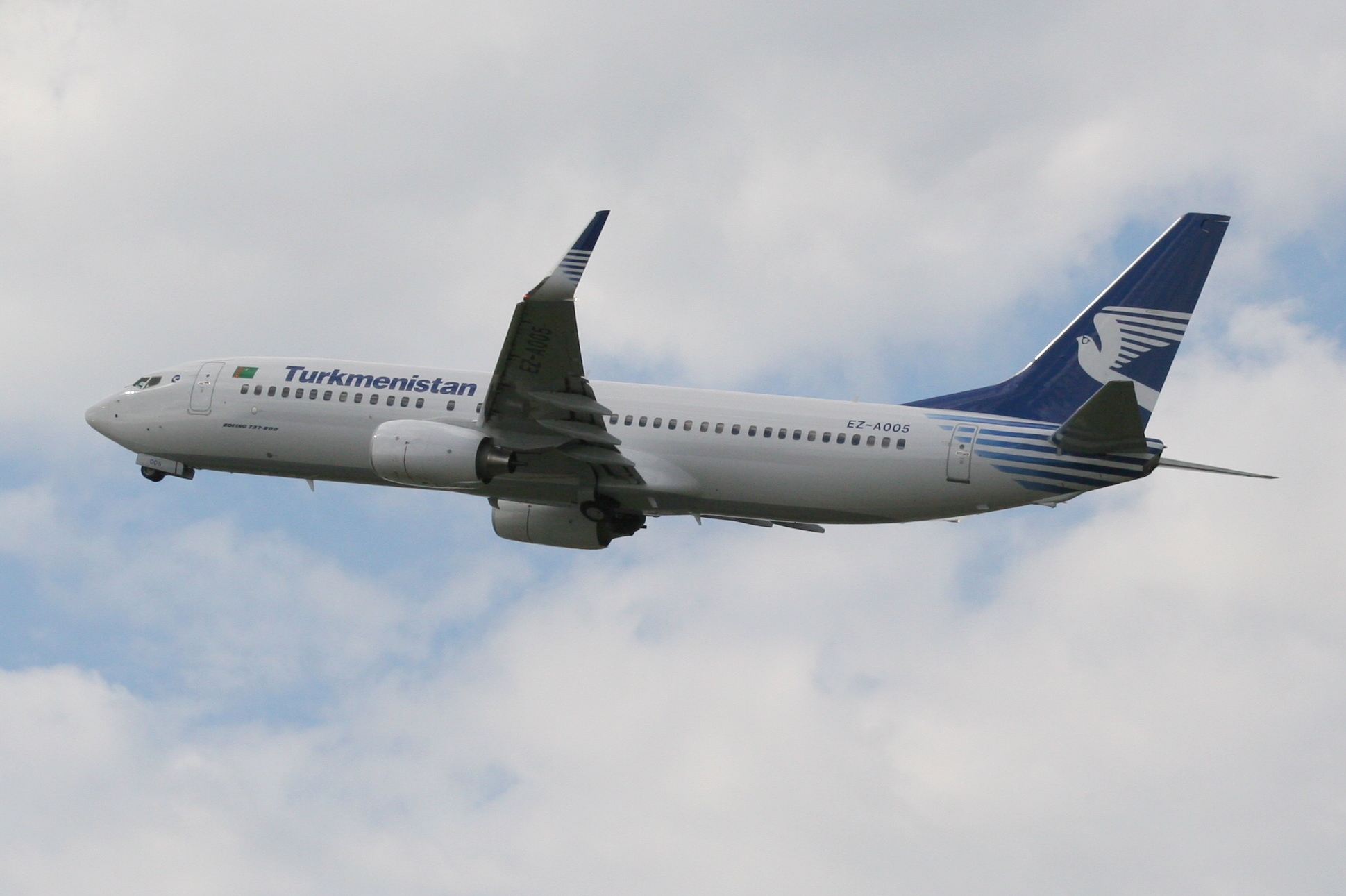
A Boeing 737-800 of Turkmenistan Airlines taking off at London Heathrow Airport

== Corporate affairs ==
=== Headquarters ===
The headquarters of Turkmenistan Airlines are in Hero of Turkmenistan Atamyrat Nyýazow Avenue, 326 in Ashgabat.

=== Branding ===
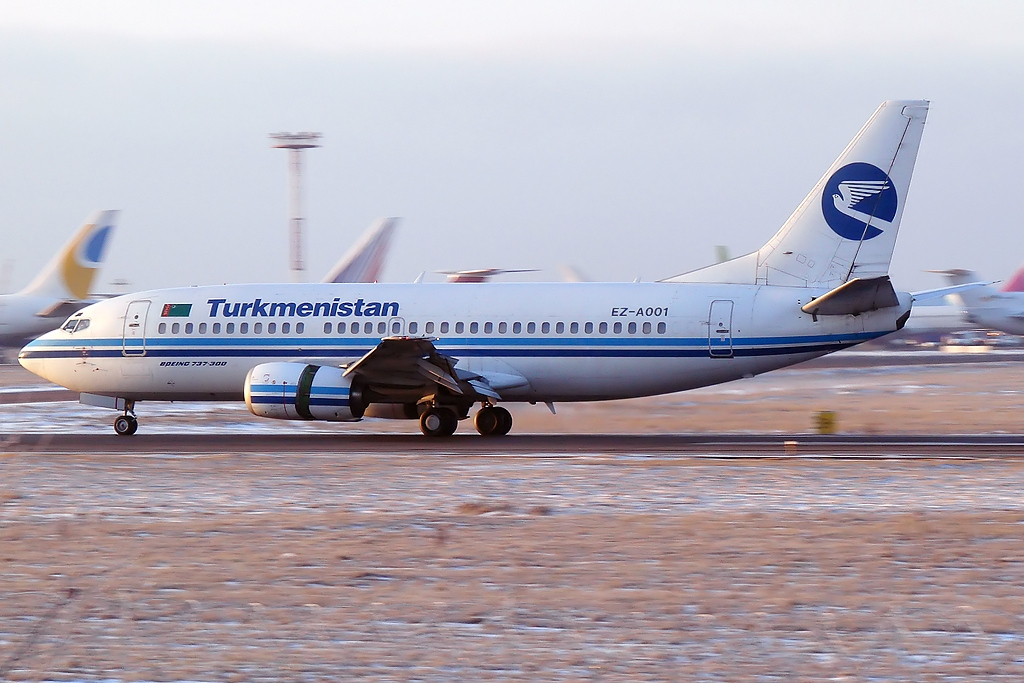
Turkmenistan Airlines Boeing 737-300 in the old livery used since 1992

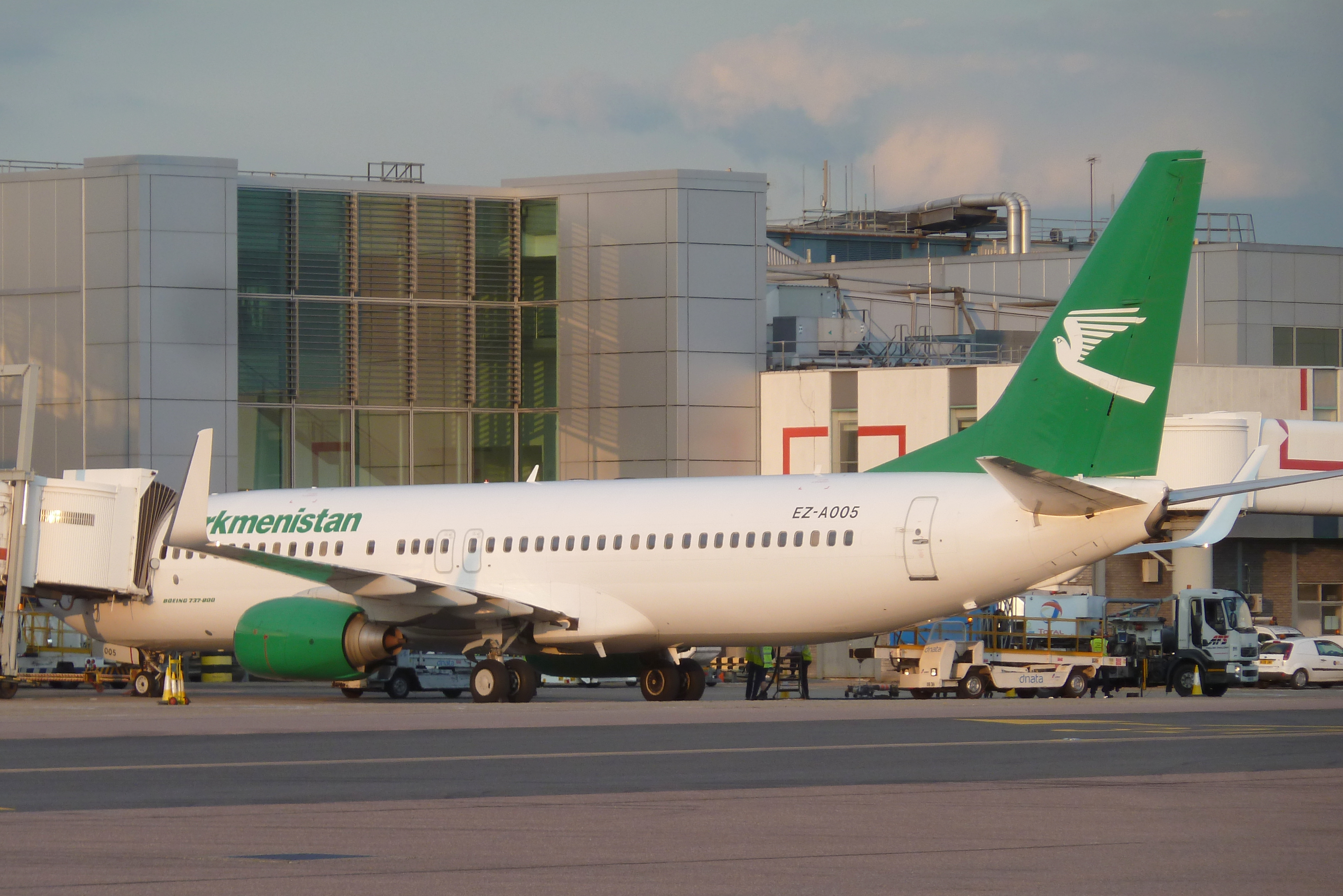
Turkmenistan Airlines Boeing 737-800 in the livery adopted since the 2000s

The Turkmenistan Airlines logo, an encircled stylized falcon in flight, was created in 1992 on a blue background.

In the 2000s, Turkmenistan Airlines changed their livery. The encircled falcon was retained, and the background changed from blue to green. The aircraft's engines were painted green, new Turkmenistan Airlines logo on a green background was painted on the tail section. The main fuselage was painted in all white, and the brand name "Turkmenistan" was painted above the windows, also in green.

=== Sponsorship ===
The company has been the primary sponsor of the 2017 Asian Indoor and Martial Arts Games in Ashgabat.

== Services ==
=== Cabin ===
Turkmenistan Airlines operates a two-class configuration on its domestic and international routes: Business Class and Economy.

Premium Economy is offered on all Boeing 777-300ERs. Turkmenistan Airlines introduced a premium economy class in December 2023.

=== Catering ===
Food and beverages are complimentary on all flights.

=== In-flight magazine ===
Turkmenistan Airlines' in-flight magazine, Lachyn (Falcon), is provided to all passengers on all international and domestic flights. Lachyn was introduced in October 2012 and is printed and published once a quarter. The magazine is published in Turkmen, Russian and English.
