= Ashgabat International Airport =

International airport in Ashgabat, Turkmenistan

Ashgabat International Airport Aşgabat halkara howa menzili

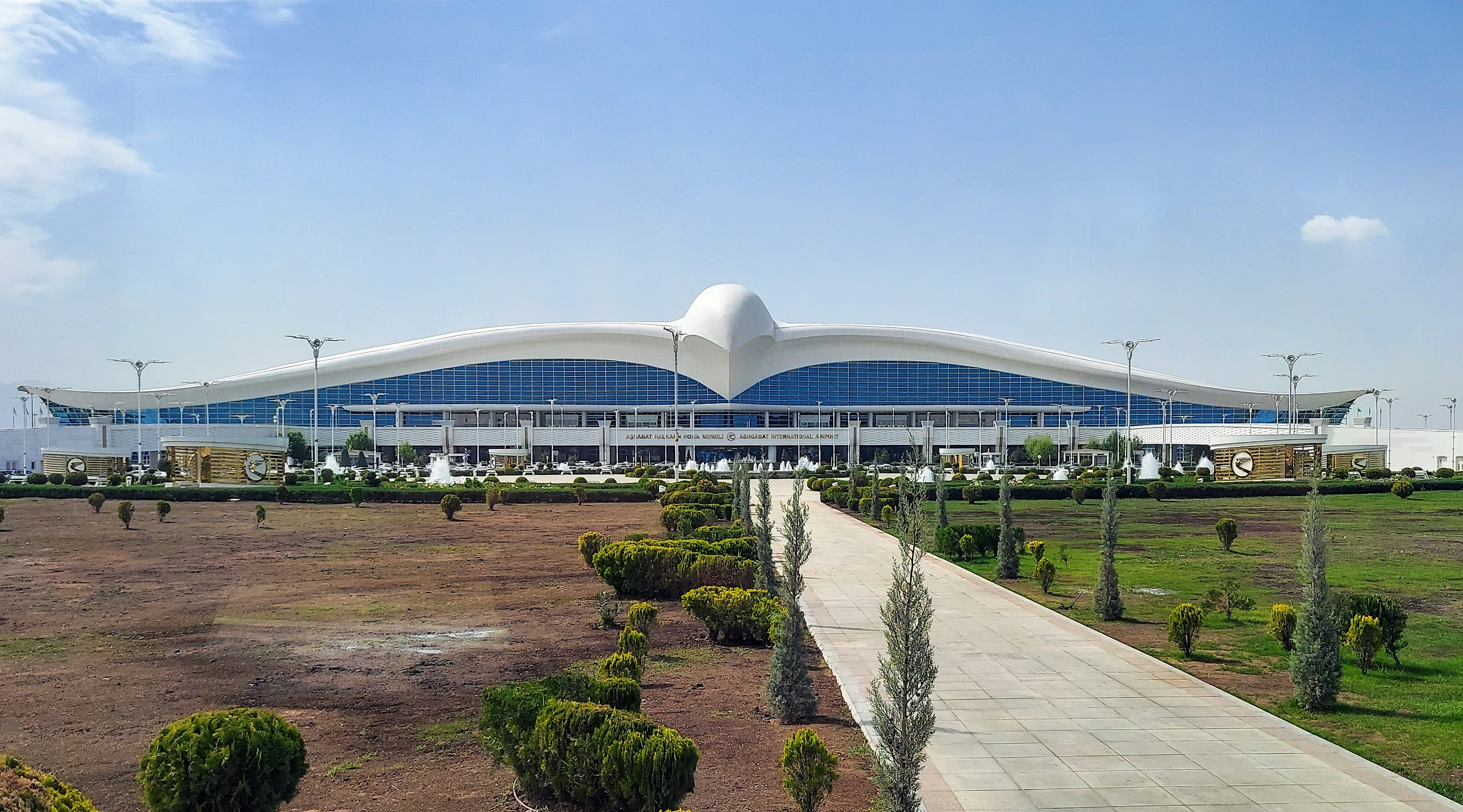
- IATA: ASB; ICAO: UTAA

Summary
- Airport type: Public
- Owner: Government of Turkmenistan
- Operator: Turkmenhowaýollary State Service
- Serves: Ashgabat, Arkadag, Änew
- Location: Bagtyýarlyk, Ashgabat
- Hub for: Turkmenistan Airlines
- Time zone: TMT (UTC+05:00)
- Elevation AMSL: 692 ft (211 m)
- Coordinates: 37°59′13″N 58°21′39″E
- Website: ashgabatairport.gov.tm

Maps
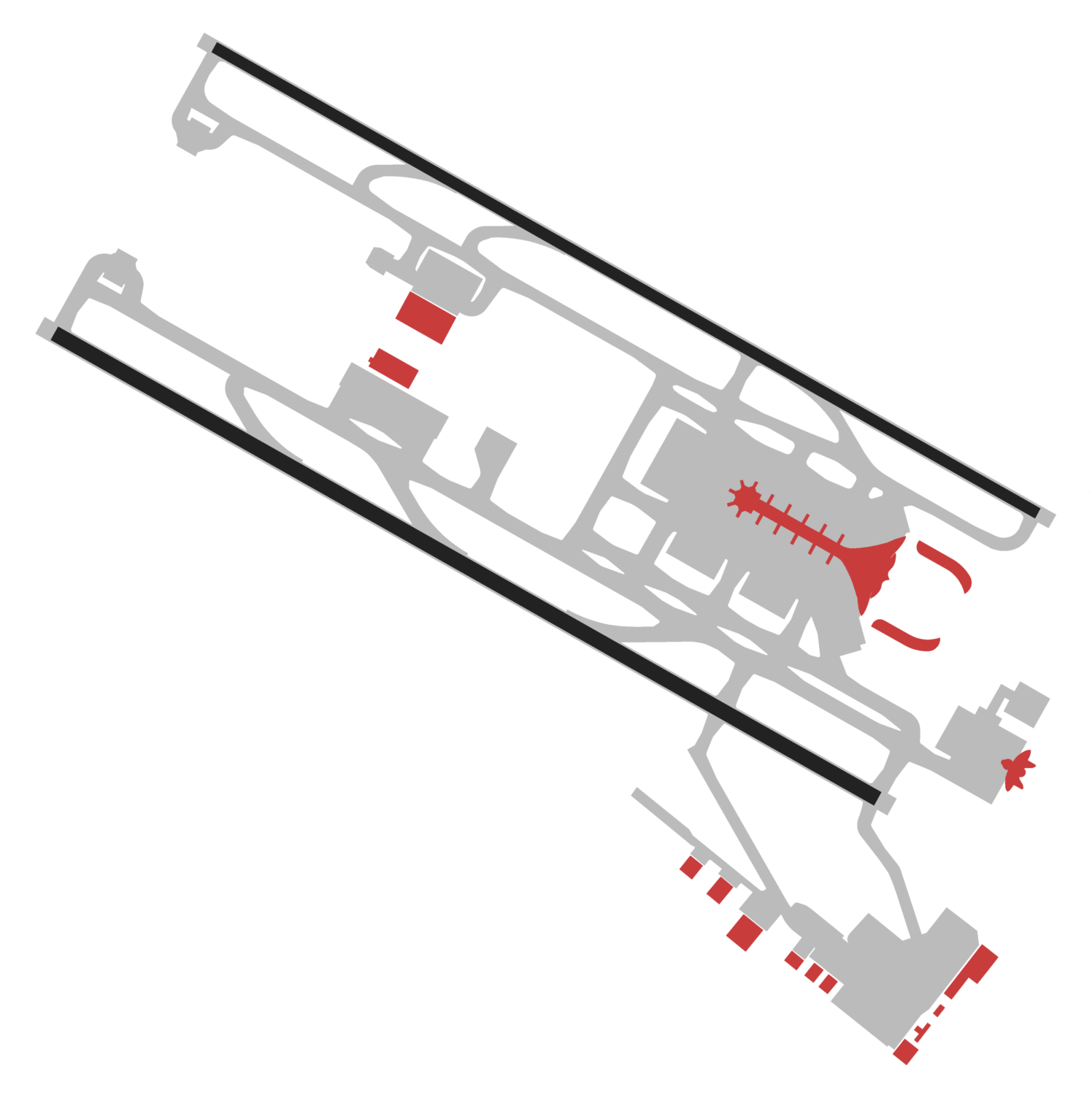
- Airport diagram

- Location of airport in Turkmenistan

Runways
| Direction | Length | | Surface |
| Direction | ft | m | Surface |
|---|---|---|---|
| 11L/29R | 12,467 | 3,800 | Concrete |
| 11R/29L | 12,467 | 3,800 | Concrete |

Statistics (2016)
- Number of Passengers: 1,300,000
- Source: AIP Turkmenistan

Ashgabat International Airport (Turkmen: Aşgabat halkara howa menzili) (IATA: ASB, ICAO: UTAA), formerly known as Saparmyrat Türkmenbaşy International Airport, is one of seven international airports in Turkmenistan. It is located within the city limits of Ashgabat. The old airport, with its air traffic control tower and a 3,700-metre-long (12,000 ft) precision approach runway (12L-30R), opened in 1994 and was named after the country's first president, Saparmyrat Nyýazow. The new airport terminal opened in September 2016, after being completely redesigned and rebuilt and after the south runway was moved and lengthened to parallel the north runway.

Citizens of all countries have the right to visa-free transit through the international transit area of Ashgabat International Airport.

== History ==
=== Soviet ===
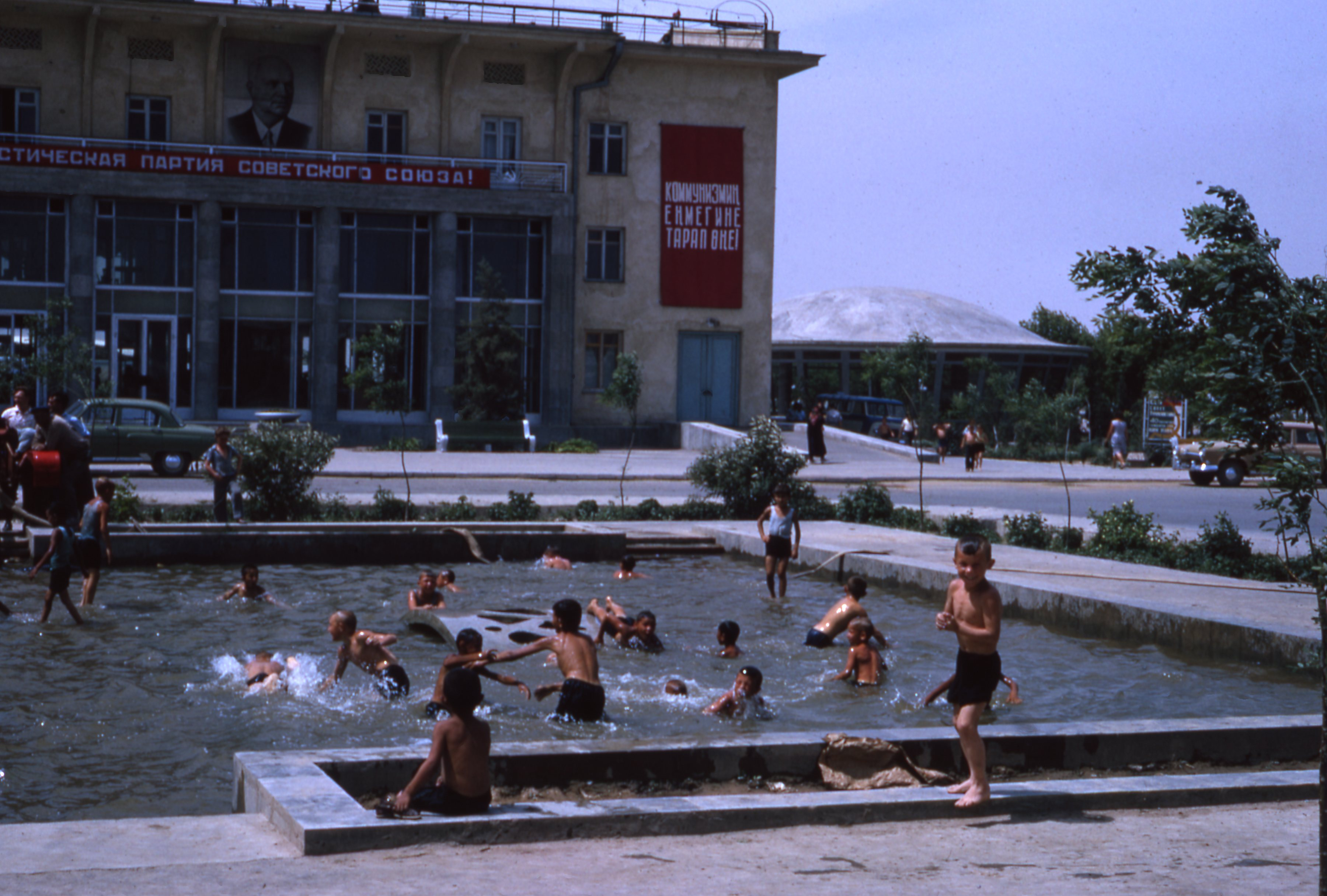
Outside the airport in Ashgabat, 1964

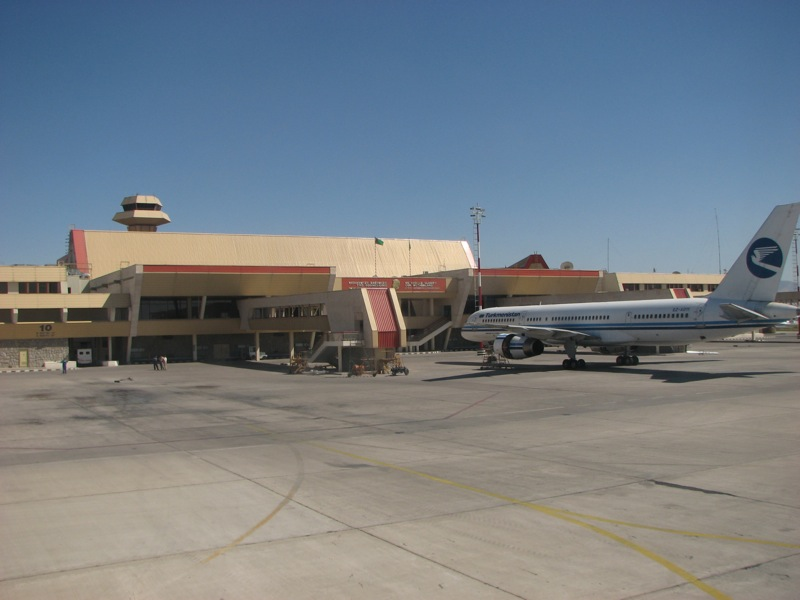
The former terminal used 1994-2013

Interior of the new terminal

Turkmen civil aviation began in 1927, the year air communications began between Çärjew and Daşhowuz, flying through the settlements of Toʻrtkoʻl and Novo-Urgench (both in the Uzbek SSR). For this route, four-passenger Junkers F.13 aircraft were purchased in Germany, as well as Soviet four-passenger Kalinin K-4 aircraft. Eight aircraft served this airline. Later, in 1932, newer Soviet aircraft were purchased for the transport of passengers. The Kalinin K-5 aircraft seated six, and the Tupolev ANT-9 aircraft had twelve seats. With this replenishment of the Turkmen SSR air fleet, in 1932 an air division was formed at Çärjew Airport that directly served the Çärjew-Daşhowuz route, without stops in other settlements.

The first airport building in Ashgabat was built in 1932, and at the end of 1934 two air units were formed there: one was equipped with Po-2 aircraft (for agricultural use), and the other consisted of TB-3 aircraft (for cargo transportation) . In 1935, was opened Ashgabat-Daşhowuz airline route.

In 1944, Turkmen SSR air fleet was replenished with the Li-2 aircraft, which transported passengers and mail from Ashgabat to Moscow via Baku, Astrakhan and Volgograd. From 1946, Soviet aircraft Ilyushin Il-12, Il-14, An-2, Yak-12 began to be used on airlines. In the 1950s, Tu-104, Tu-114, Il-18, and An-24 aircraft appeared in the Turkmen SSR's fleet. Powerful airliners made it possible to connect Ashkhabad by air lines with the largest cities of the USSR, the capitals of the union republics. In 1935, was opened Ashgabat-Daşhowuz airline route.

In the 1980s, the civil aviation of the Turkmen SSR had the Tu-154, Yak-40, Yak-42, An-24, An-26 aircraft. Ashgabat Airport has modern radio and radar equipment that allows it to receive aircraft at any time of the day and under adverse weather conditions.

=== Independent Turkmenistan ===
As part of Saparmyrat Nyýazow's aspiration to transform Turkmenistan into 'the new Kuwait', he sought to construct a distinctive airport. This zeal resulted in the control tower being constructed on the wrong side of the runway. The 'gaudy new terminal' blocked the view of air traffic controllers as they guided pilots. The builders warned him of this, however he responded: "It looks better this way." The building was dismantled in 2013. On 26 March 2014, a small passenger Terminal was opened. The terminal is located on the site of a pre-existing Turkmen SSR airport (behind the bus station) on 2013 Street (Cosmonaut Boulevard). For the period of construction of the main passenger terminal the temporary terminal served passengers departing from and arriving to Ashgabat. After commissioning of the main terminal in 2016, the terminal was used for domestic routes and charter flights, and is currently used as a cargo storage facility.

=== New building (2016) ===
The Turkmen government let an international tender in 2012 for reconstruction of the airport in Ashgabat, to be named "Oguz Han". Polimeks, a Turkish construction company active in Turkmenistan since the late-1990s, was declared winner of the tender. Polimeks commissioned the Dutch aviation consultancy NACO (Netherlands Airport Consultants) to develop the basic design of the new terminal, with Marc Ibelings of Ibelings van Tilburg Architecten serving as project architect. The new airport was opened on 17 September 2016 by President Gurbanguly Berdimuhamedow. The project cost $2.3 billion (€1.7 billion) and features a highly unusual terminal design in the shape of a falcon. The new airport has capacity to serve 14 million passengers per year at a rate of 1,600 passengers per hour. The airport covers 350,000 square metres (3,800,000 sq ft) and includes a passenger terminal, VIP terminal, cargo terminal with capacity to handle 200,000 tonnes of freight per year, a new air traffic control tower (ATCT), a maintenance hangar for three narrow-body aircraft, new fueling stations, catering, fire brigade, flight simulation, repair and maintenance buildings, parking space for 3,000 cars, a civil aviation school as well as a medical center. The airport has also a second 3,800-meter long runway to serve wide-body, double-deck jet airliners such as the Airbus A380 and Boeing 747-8. Current members of Toldy Construct team also contributed to this project. They helped to realize specialised construction and design elements of the facade and roof.

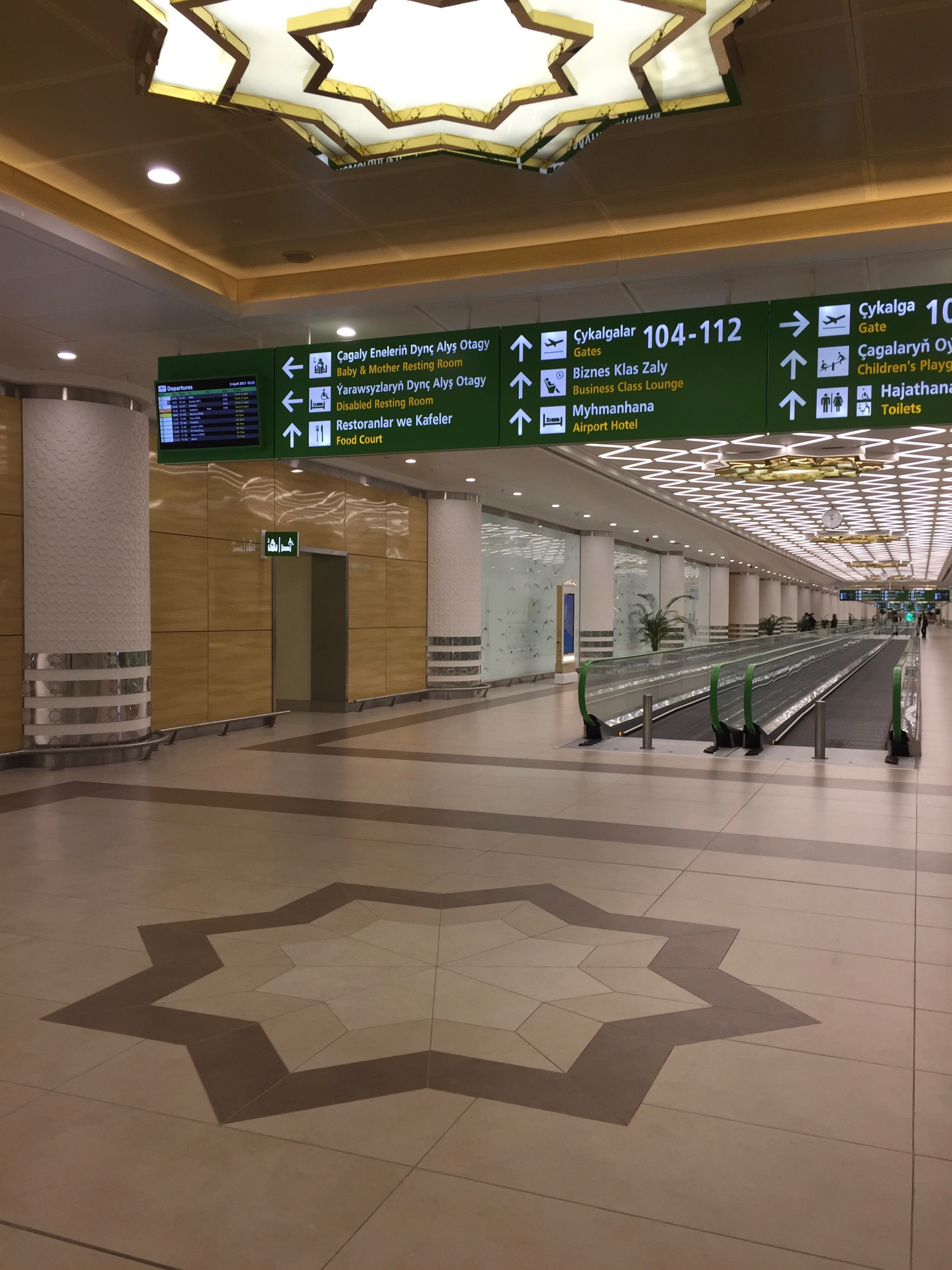
Departures hall.

== Facilities ==
=== Runways ===
Ashgabat International Airport now has two artificial runways, equipped with the second category ILS and platform, enabling them to take aircraft of all types. Their length is 3800 meters.

=== Cargo terminal ===
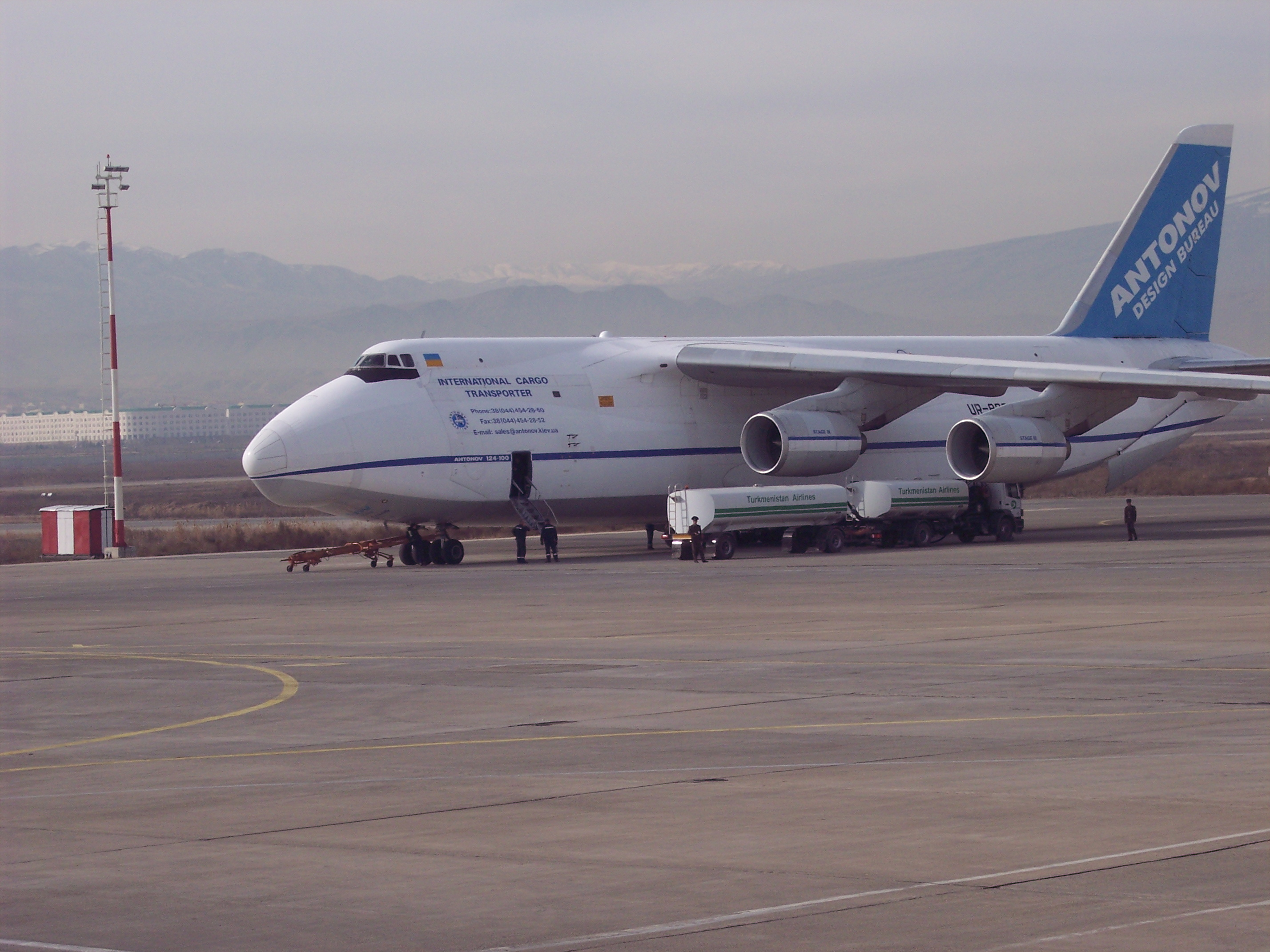
An-124 in the cargo terminal at Ashgabat International Airport

The cargo terminal at Ashgabat International Airport, spanning 17,174 m², can handle up to 200 tons of cargo annually. It has export and import zones, cold storage, specialized rooms for animals and plants, and a medical room. Equipped with an automated Elevating Transfer Vehicles (ETV) system, it supports efficient cargo handling, including loading and unloading. Storage areas are available for perishable goods, valuable items, and dangerous goods. The terminal includes 4 loading docks in the import section and 4 in the export section, as well as a distribution center for Turkmenistan's national postal service Türkmenpoçta.

=== Hotel ===
For the crew and transit passengers, the Laçyn Hotel is a special hotel located in the transit zone of Ashgabat International Airport.

== Services ==
=== Passenger services ===
A multimedia platform is available via Wi-Fi at Ashgabat International Airport. Passengers can access films, music, and press on their devices.

Turkmentelecom provides wireless high-speed Internet service in the transit zone of airport.

Various lounge areas are provided, some including children's play areas or televisions showing news, movies and sports channels.

Ashgabat International Airport has a left luggage facility where layover passengers can leave their luggage for a fee while they go sightseeing.

== Airlines and destinations ==
The following airlines offer year-round and seasonal scheduled flights to and from Ashgabat as of August 2026:

=== Passenger ===
| Airlines | Destinations |
|---|---|
| China Southern Airlines | Ürümqi, Xi'an |
| flydubai | Dubai–International |
| S7 Airlines | Moscow–Domodedovo |
| Turkish Airlines | Istanbul |
| Turkmenistan Airlines | Kerki, Balkanabat, Beijing–Capital, Daşoguz, Delhi, Frankfurt, Ho Chi Minh City, Istanbul, Mary, Kazan, Kuala Lumpur–International, London–Gatwick, Milan–Malpensa, Seoul–Incheon, Türkmenabat, Türkmenbaşy; Seasonal: Medina |

=== Cargo ===
| Airlines | Destinations | Refs |
|---|---|---|
| Air Belgium | Brussels | |
| Cargolux Italia | Milan–Malpensa | |
| Cargolux | Budapest, London–Stansted, Luxembourg, Taipei–Taoyuan | |
| Turkmenistan Airlines Cargo | Abu Dhabi, Daşoguz, Dubai–Al Maktoum, Frankfurt, Hanoi, Istanbul, Mary, Milan–Malpensa, Moscow–Sheremetyevo, Seoul–Incheon, Shenzhen, Türkmenbaşy, Ürümqi | |

== Ground transportation ==
=== Road ===
The airport is located near M37 highway and connect to them as a four-lane motorway. Terminal parking, short-term and long-term parking is available at the airport. Passengers driving their own cars can park in multilevel parking garages (mostly underground) along the terminal.

=== Bus ===
There is regular bus service by bus line 1, 18, 22, 58 and 76 from the airport to Ashgabat city.

=== Taxi ===
The Awtomobil Ulag Hyzmaty company offers services at Ashgabat Airport.

== Commemoration ==
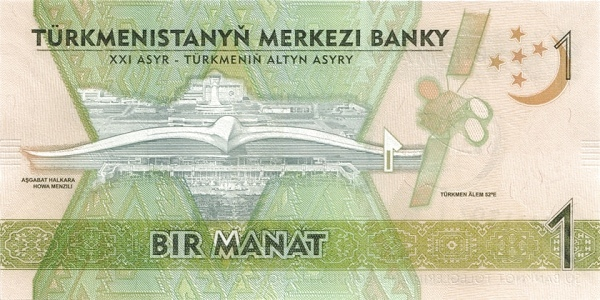
1 manat (2017)

The Ashgabat International Airport is depicted on the 1 Turkmen manat note.

== See also ==
- List of the busiest airports in the former USSR
- List of airports in Turkmenistan
- Transportation in Turkmenistan
