= Telecommunications in Turkmenistan =

Turkmenistan has a state-controlled press and monitored communication systems. Turkmenistan's telecommunications services are considered to be the least developed of all the Commonwealth of Independent States (CIS) countries. Overall, the telecom market in this predominantly rural country is relatively small but has been trying boldly to expand in recent years. The state-owned Turkmen Telecom has been the primary provider of public telephone, email and internet services, and through a subsidiary has been operating a GSM mobile network in competition with a private mobile operator, BCTI (BCTI became MTS Turkmenistan in 2005).

== Satellite ==
The first Turkmen communication satellite TurkmenSat 1 was launched aboard SpaceX Falcon 9 in April 2015. Built by the French company Thales Alenia Space, the satellite is from the Spacebus 4000 family. The satellite covers Europe and significant number of Asian countries as well as Africa and transmits TV, radio broadcasting and the internet. The satellite's operations are controlled by the state-run Turkmenistan National Space Agency (TNSA).The satellite has an anticipated service life of 15 years.

== Mobile ==
BCTI was the only GSM operator in the country with a 10-year exclusive license granted in 1994. Due to lack of competition, BCTI continued to operate without investing much to cover rural areas. The expensive cost of the service has limited the number of subscribers to a very small percentage of the general population.

The Mobile phone sector started to improve rapidly after the expiration of company's exclusive license in 2004. The Russian mobile phone operator MTS acquired BCTI and state-owned communication company TurkmenTelekom opened a new subsidiary, Altyn Asyr. The number of mobile phone subscribers has now reached over 4,440,000 (MTS - 1,440,000 and Altyn Asyr GSM 3,000,000). With a population of 5 million, this translates into 88.8% mobile penetration rate.

In November 2023 Altyn Asyr was the first in Turkmenistan to present an opportunity to switch over to eSIM.

In June 2025 Türkmenaragatnaşyk Agency announced that it has launched 5G network across Arkadag city in Turkmenistan.

== Internet service ==
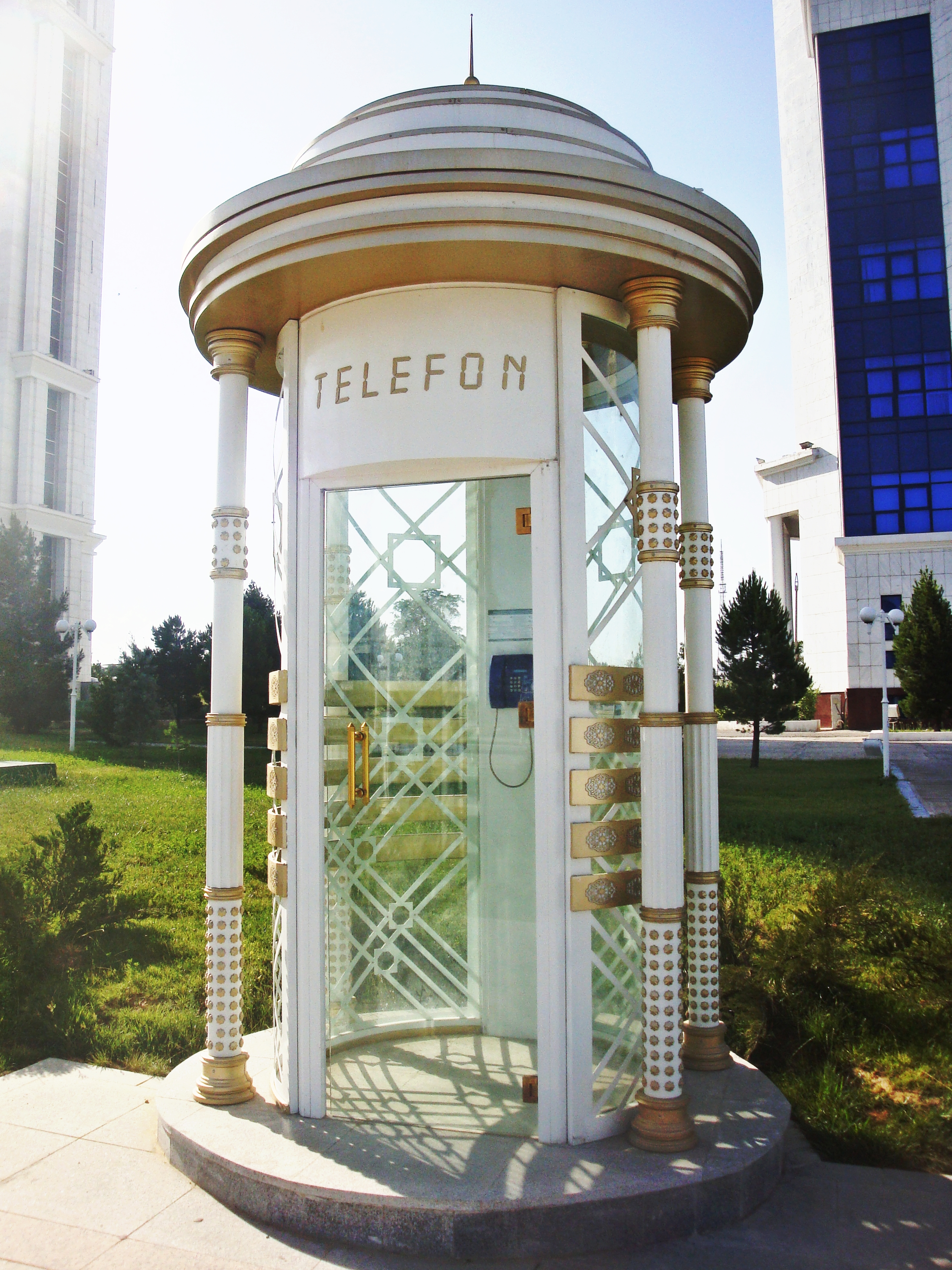
Telephone booth in Ashgabat

Turkmenistan gained access to the Internet in 1997 through a contract with MCI Communications (later became MCI WorldCom). A small number of independent Internet service providers were forced out of business in 2001 when Turkmentelecom was granted a monopoly over data services. Dependence on expensive satellite channels limited the availability of Internet to only two thousand subscribers. To upgrade the Internet backbone, Ministry of Communication signed a contract with TATA Communications for routing traffic through Transit-Asia-Europe fiber optic channel. As a result of this development, TurkmenTelecom started offering an access to the higher speed Internet with ADSL to the consumers in Turkmenistan.

In 2008, MTS started offering Internet service to mobile subscribers via GPRS. Altyn Asyr was first to launch 3G and 2 Mbit/s mobile internet service in March 2010. The move surprised mobile customers as the provider were known for inferior but cheaper service. In 2013 Altyn Asyr launched a 4G network based on LTE. In 2013, unlimited use of the internet became available, reducing the total cost of services from Turkmentelecom.

In Turkmenistan, as of November 2023, 3,149,178 people are connected to the Internet. Of these, 421,609 are wired Internet users, and 2,727,569 are mobile users.

The Top-level domain of Turkmenistan is .tm.

=== Censorship ===
Individual access to the Internet was first authorised in 2008, and access has since increased.

Turkmenistan ranks among the most repressive and closed societies in the world. The Internet is heavily regulated and available only to a small fraction of the population. Censorship is ubiquitous and extensive. Surveillance is significant, and the few citizens who benefit from access to the Internet are closely monitored by state agencies. Self-censorship is common.

Websites run by human rights organisations and news agencies are blocked. Moreover, ordinary citizens have no access to the World Wide Web, and instead are limited to the use of the Turkmenet, an online community in Turkmen language, but effectively a censored version of the Internet. Social networks such as Facebook, YouTube and X (formerly Twitter) are not accessible through the Turkmenet. Attempts to get around this censorship can lead to grave consequences. However, there is a local Turkmen social network, Gyzgyn, founded on 27 March 2012, which is currently accessible.

Internet censorship in Turkmenistan was classified as pervasive in the political area and as selective in the social, conflict/security and internet tools areas by the OpenNet Initiative in December 2010. Turkmenistan was listed as an internet enemy by Reporters Without Borders in 2011.

== Television ==
External videos
- Example of Turkmenistan TV News

An analog TV signal feed of 5 national channels is receivable over-the-air in all living areas across the country. Foreign TV channels are watched with a digital satellite receiver. In some places of Ashgabat, cable service is available where satellite dishes are not allowed to be installed. DVB-T test transmissions have only taken place in the capital and there are no digital switch-over plans as yet.

List of broadcast stations:

- Altyn Asyr (Golden Age) on channel R1 (49.75 MHz) in Aşgabat, R3 (77.25 MHz) in Türkmenabat and Daşoguz, R4 (85.25 MHz) in Uly Balkan Gerşi.
- Ýaşlyk (Youth)
- Miras (Inheritance) on channel R5 (93.25 MHz) in Aşgabat
- Turkmenistan - News channel broadcast in 7 languages.
- Türkmen Owazy - Turkmen Music channel, launched in 2009.
- Aşgabat
- Türkmenistan Sport - sports channel, launched in 2012.
- Arkadag - launched in 2023.

Previously, all 7 of the national channels were aired on the Yamal satellites for an international audience. Since 1 July 2016 all national channels in Turkmenistan are broadcast by the TürkmenÄlem 52°E national satellite that was launched on 27 April 2015.

=== IPTV ===
IPTV has been developing fast as a cheap alternative to regular television. The IPTV service is used by more than 100,000 subscribers in Ashgabat.

== Telephone ==
Telephones - main lines in use: 500,000 (2006)
domestic: 500 automatic telephone stations and 500,000 telephone numbers.
international: linked by cable and microwave radio relay to other Commonwealth of Independent States republics and to other countries by leased connections to the Moscow international gateway switch; a new telephone link from Ashgabat to Iran has been established; a new exchange in Ashgabat switches international traffic through Turkey via Intelsat; satellite earth stations - 1 Orbita and 1 Intelsat

== Newspapers ==
List of newspapers in Turkmenistan:

- Turkmenskaya Iskra (Soviet-era)
- Balkan newspaper, Turkmenistan (Balkanabat)
- "Neutral Turkmenistan"

=== Online ===
- Turkmenportal
- InAshgabat
- Biz barde social media

== TurkmenTel ==
Starting from 2007 the Ministry of Communication has organised the international exhibition "TurkmenTel" each year. Leading companies from all around the world are invited to Ashgabat to exhibit their technologies.
