= Mass media in Turkmenistan =

The mass media in Turkmenistan are among the world's most tightly controlled. The press is controlled by the government, which funds nearly all newspapers, criticism of the president is forbidden, and state licensing policy effectively eliminates all outlets not reflecting official views. To avoid reprisal, domestic and foreign journalists engage in self-censorship.

The only domestic news agency is the State News Agency of Turkmenistan. The Anadolu Agency of Turkey maintains an office in Ashgabat, and TRT has a representative there. Agence France Press, Associated Press, Reuters, and ITAR-TASS receive reports from stringers. 57 correspondents of foreign media, accredited by the Ministry of Foreign Affairs of Turkmenistan.

Broadcasting is under the full control of the Turkmenistan Television Broadcasting Center, which operates seven national television channels. Little recent information on radio stations is available.

Reporters Without Borders' 2022 Press Freedom Index ranked Turkmenistan 177th out of 180 countries surveyed, ahead of Iran, Eritrea, and the DPRK. It has consistently ranked at or near the bottom of most measures of press freedom since the breakup of the Soviet Union.

== Newspapers and magazines ==
Twenty-two newspapers (2 privately owned) and 14 magazines (none privately owned) are published in Turkmenistan. Content of the state-owned newspapers differs little to not at all, consisting of republishing of copy from the state-owned news agency. They are very expensive by Turkmen standards, with the most expensive newspaper costing $0.50. A one-year subscription equals one month minimum wage. Some domestic online newspapers have been founded, notably Turkmenportal and Orient. Russian magazines and Uzbek newspapers are sold in some kiosks.

=== National newspapers ===
Electronic copies of most state-published newspapers may be downloaded from the website of the State Printing Office.

- Neytralny Turkmenistan (Russian: Neutral Turkmenistan – published six days per week in Russian, the main Russian-medium newspaper of Turkmenistan. Founded in 1924, during the Soviet period called Turkmenskaya Iskra (Russian: Turkmen Spark)
- Turkmenistan – the main Turkmen-medium newspaper of Turkmenistan, published in Turkmen six times per week since 1920.
- Watan (Turkmen: Homeland) – Published three times per week, during the Soviet period called Yash Kommunistler (Turkmen: Young Communists).
- Nesil (Turkmen: Generation) – Owned and published by Magtymguly Youth Organization three times per week.
- Adalat (Turkmen: Justice) – Owned and published by Ministry of Justice weekly.
- Rysgal (Turkmen: Welfare) – Owned and published weekly by the Chamber of Commerce and Industry of Turkmenistan; the country's first and only private newspaper.
- Türkmen Sporty (Turkmen: Turkmen Sports) – Owned and published weekly by the State Sports and Youth Committee of Turkmenistan.
- Nebit-Gaz (Turkmen: Oil and Gas) – Owned and published by Türkmengaz state concern, now an electronic newspaper. Previously published, starting in 2011, by the now-defunct Ministry of Oil and Gas.
- Mugallymlar Gazeti (Turkmen: Pedagogical Newspaper) – Owned and published three times per week by Ministry of Education of Turkmenistan.
- Habarlar (Turkmen: News) – Owned and published by the Economic Editorial Association three times per week, mainly economic and commercial news, classified advertising, since 1975.
- Zaman Turkmenistan – Owned and published by Turkish newspaper Zaman. It was published weekly in Turkmen. It was closed by the government after a coup attempt in Turkey.
- Edebiyat we Sungat (Turkmen: Literature and Art) – Owned and published weekly since 1958 by the Ministry of Culture.
- Bereketli Toprak (Turkmen: Fertile Soil) – Owned and published weekly since 2008 Ministry of Agriculture and Water Resources of Turkmenistan.
- Türkmen Dünýäsi (Turkmen: Turkmen World.) – Owned and published twice monthly since 1991 by the Humanitarian Association of World Turkmens.
- Türkmeniň Ýüpek Ýoly (Turkmen: Turkmen Silk Road) – Owned and published weekly by the Railways Agency of Turkmenistan. Published since 1936.
- Esger (Turkmen: Soldier) – Owned and published weekly since 1993 by the Ministry of Defence of Turkmenistan.
- Biznes Reklama (Turkmen: Business Advertising) – Owned and published by the Ministry of Trade and Foreign Economic Relations.
- Galkynysh (Turkmen: Renaissance) – Owned and published weekly since 1997 by the Democratic Party of Turkmenistan.

=== Regional newspapers ===
- Ashgabat
- Maru-Şahu-Jahan – Mary Velayat, published since 1931, in Turkmen, three times per week.
- Ahal Durmuşy (Ahal Life) – Ahal Velayat, published in Turkmen three times in a week.
- Daşoguz Habarlary (Dashoguz News) – Dashoguz Velayat, published in Turkmen three times in a week.
- Türkmen Gündogary (Turkmen Orient) – Lebap Velayat, published in Turkmen three times in a week.
- Balkan – Balkan Velayat, published in Turkmen three times in a week.

=== Online newspapers ===
- Arzuw News – independent, private news agency.
- Gorogly.com – Technology news and updates website
- Azatlyk Radiosy – (Radio Free Europe Turkmen Service).
- Biz barde – independent, private outlet social network.
- Business Turkmenistan – independent, business news and information service.
- Chronicles of Turkmenistan – foreign-based independent media outlet.
- Gundogar News – state-controlled, of unknown ownership.
- Gundogar.org – foreign-based independent media outlet.
- InAshgabat – independent, private news outlet and internet portal focused on Ashgabat local news.
- Infoabad – independent, private news outlet and internet portal.
- Orient – independent, private information agency owned by «Media Turkmen», founded in 2017.
- Parahat Info – news aggregator.
- Türkiýe-Türkmenistan
- Türkmen Habar
- Turkmen News – foreign-based independent media outlet, formerly known as "Alternative News of Turkmenistan".
- Turkmen Yurt TV – foreign-based independent media
- Türkmen Inform
- Turkmenistan Today – (TDH official website) – state-owned.
- Turkmenistan: Golden Age – service of Neytralny Turkmenistan, state-owned.
- Turkmenistan.ru – foreign-based independent media outlet.
- Turkmenportal – news aggregator and internet portal.

=== Magazines ===
- Altyn Asyr Ykdysadyýeti (Turkmen: The Golden Age Economy) – Owned and published monthly since 2000 by Ministry of Economy and Development of Turkmenistan.
- Diýar (Turkmen: The Land) – Owned and published monthly since 1992 by Cabinet of Ministers (Turkmenistan).
- Dünya Edebiýaty (Turkmen: World Literature) – Owned and published monthly by Turkmen State Publishing Service.
- Garagum (Turkmen: Karakum) – Owned and published monthly by Turkmen State Publishing Service.
- Güneş (Turkmen: Sun) – Owned and published monthly by Ministry of Education of Turkmenistan.
- Saglyk (Turkmen: Health) – Owned and published semimonthly since 1990 by Ministry of Health of Turkmenistan.
- Türkmenistan Sport
- Türkmenistanda Ylym we Tehnika (Turkmen: Science and Technology in Turkmenistan) – Published semimonthly.
- Türkmenistanyň lukmançylygy (Turkmen: Turkmenistan's Medicine)
- Täze Oba (Turkmen: New Village) – Owned and published monthly since 1929 by Ministry of Agriculture and Water Resources of Turkmenistan.
- Возрождение (Vozrozhdeniye, Renaissance in Russian) – Owned and published monthly by the Democratic Party of Turkmenistan. Published since 1937, previously by the Turkmen Communist Party.
- Zenan Kalby (Turkmen: Woman's Heart) – Owned and published monthly by Women's Union of Turkmenistan. Published since 1931.

== Television ==
In Turkmenistan, satellite TV from Russia, Turkey and Uzbekistan is popular. Viewers subscribe to Cable TV and IPTV, which are generally available for a monthly fee of 10 manat per month.

Turkmenistan broadcasts 8 public television channels (7 of them on the territory of the whole country, and 1 only in Ashgabat). All broadcast in the Turkmen language with the exception of the Turkmenistan news channel, which broadcasts in 7 languages. They do not differ from each other in news content. These sources of information are an ideological mouthpiece of the ruling regime in the country. Any opinion or idea that differs from that of the President of Turkmenistan cannot be broadcast, nor can criticism of the country (except if the criticism is made by the president himself). The channels also present informative and entertaining domestic programs and movies, as well as sports events in which Turkmen athletes participate. Sometimes Altyn Asyr broadcasts popular movies dubbed in Turkmen in the evenings. Turkmenistan Sport regularly broadcasts Formula 1, football matches of Serie A, La Liga, Bundesliga and other sports thanks to an agreement with the Irish company Setanta Sports. Only state companies and institutions advertise on Turkmen television.

=== TV channels ===
- Altyn Asyr (formerly TMT-1; English: Golden Age) – The main channel of the country.
- Ýaşlyk (formerly TMT-2; English: Youth) – Channel catering to the youth of Turkmenistan.
- Miras (formerly TMT-3; English: Heritage) – TV channel about the culture and heritage of the Turkmen people
- Türkmenistan (formerly TMT-4) – international channel broadcast in seven different languages.
- Türkmen Owazy (English: Turkmen Voice) – Turkmen music channel.
- Aşgabat – TV channel broadcasting programs about Ashgabat.
- Türkmenistan Sport – sports channel.
- Arkadag — TV channel broadcasting programs about the city of Arkadag.

==== TV programs ====
- Watan Habarlary, national news program broadcasting on all channels at once.

=== IPTV ===
- AŞTU (Aşgabat şäher telefon ulgamy, English: Ashgabat City Telephone System) – the company announced that it had 104,062 subscribers in 2018. Viewers have access to 136 local and foreign TV channels, including those in HD quality.

=== Satellite television ===
Private company Alem TV offers 125 international pay-per-view satellite TV channels for Android smart TVs.

=== Cable television ===
The state-owned enterprise Turkmen Telekom operates cable TV activities in the country. The service is not a brand.

== Radio ==
There are four radio stations in Turkmenistan:

- TR1 Radio Watan (279 kHz & 102.7 MHz)
- TR2 Radio Çar-Tarapdan (69.68 MHz)
- TR3 Radio Miras (103.9 MHz)
- TR4 Radio Owazy (101.3 & 104.4 MHz)

TR1 broadcasts on longwave, medium wave, OIRT FM, and CCIR FM; TR2 and TR3 broadcast on medium wave and OIRT & CCIR FM; and TR4 broadcasts on CCIR FM. All four stations also broadcast on DAB+ in Ashgabat and can be heard online globally via Radio Garden. There are no local or regional radio stations in the country.

== See also ==
- Communications in Turkmenistan
