= Altyn Asyr =

Altyn Asyr (Turkmen for "Golden Age") may refer to:

- Altyn Asyr (electronic newspaper), an online publication of the Turkmenistan State News Agency
- Altyn Asyr, Turkmenistan, a city in Altyn asyr District, Ahal Province, Turkmenistan
- Altyn Asyr (mobile operator), a Turkmen mobile operator
- Altyn Asyr bazaar, an oriental bazaar in Ashgabat, Turkmenistan
- Altyn Asyr FK, a Turkmen football club
- ru:Орден «Алтын Асыр» "Order of Altyn Asyr", a government decoration (medal) in Turkmenistan
- Altyn Asyr (payment system), a banking card system in Turkmenistan.
- Altyn Asyr lake (Golden Age Lake)
- Altyn Asyr (TV channel), the main TV channel of Turkmenistan.
