= Television in Turkmenistan =

In Turkmenistan, television has been operating for over 50 years and is subject to rigorous state censorship. Notorious for its totalitarian control of the media, Turkmenistan has consistently been in the bottom three of the annual Press Freedom Index since its inception in 2006.

There are 8 television channels: Altyn Asyr, Yashlyk (Yaşlyk), Miras, The Turkmenistan TV Channel, Türkmen Owazy, Ashgabat TV, Arkadag TV and Turkmenistan Sport. All of them used to be under the aegis of Ministry of Culture and Broadcasting of Turkmenistan, before being subsumed under the jurisdiction of the State Committee of Turkmenistan on TV, Radio and Film on 17 October 2011. The channels broadcast from Yamal 201, before shifting to their indigenous satellite TürkmenÄlem 52oE.

== History ==
=== Soviet era ===
The first television broadcast in Turkmenistan was held on 7 November 1959 when the Ashgabat television center conducted its first test broadcasts, mostly movies. The center would only start airing a regular service upon completion of its facilities.

=== Niyazov era ===
The Turkmen government took over the extant television network from the former Turkmen SSR. The state company was renamed TMT (after the initials in Turkmen for Turkmenistan National Television). Russophone viewers frequently nicknamed the company as "your dead TV" (твой мертвый телевизор).

In 1996, the Economist Intelligence Unit noted Turkmenistan to receive three channels — Channel One Russia, Sakhra, and Rossiyskyi. All were produced in Russia. Altyn Asyr, Yashlyk, and Miras were the first three channels to operate out of Turkmenistan. Satellite broadcasts of the three TMT channels started in 1999, with investment from US company Scientific Atlanta, enabling the channels to be available abroad. The three channels were renamed in 2001. Writing in 2005, Paul Brummell finds the troika to serve similar content encompassing documentaries about Turkmenistan, music-and-dance concerts, and dubbed foreign films (esp. Bollywood). The top-right corner of each channel featured a silhouette of Saparmurat Niyazov's head.

The setting-up of a fourth channel was authorized by Niyazov in February 2004; it started broadcasting from 12 September of the same year. Originally named TV-4, it broadcasts in six languages and is aimed at an international audience. On 12 August 2004, Niyazov banned makeup on television, under the grounds that presenters' natural skin colors matched "the color of wheat". Proportionally, at the time, there were more female presenters using whitening powder.

=== Gurbanguly Berdimuhamedow era ===
In December 2008, Niyazov's successor Gurbanguly Berdimuhamedow signed a decree establishing "Turkmen Owazy" to "promote the art of music and culture of Turkmenistan". The channel started broadcasts in January 2009.

In December 2011, Turkmenistan's first proprietary sports channel, "Sport", was established as part of a state-run campaign to promote the importance of sports to the Turkmen people, which also included Berdimuhamedow's rap song "Sportly Turkmenistan" that went viral worldwide. The channel was first aired on January 1, 2012.

From late 2011, Turkmenistan started moving towards digital TV broadcasting. In 2015, citizens were instructed to not use satellite dishes, apparently in order to preserve the aesthetics of the cityscape; critics deemed the policy as a tool of censoring non-state sources.

=== Serdar Berdimuhamedow era ===
The Ashgabat City Telephone Network removed Russia 1 and Zvezda in May 2022.

On 31 March 2023, the eighth channel, Arkadag, was announced, aiming at the newly-built city of the same name.

A cooperation agreement with the Russian Большая Азия (Big Asia) TV channel was signed in late March 2024. Turkmen state television supplied the channel with primarily cultural programming.

== Cable and satellite television ==
A limited number of foreign news channels (among them Euronews, France 24 and BBC News) are available on cable. A 2024 AFP report to Turkmenistan reveals that cable television operators are widely used as means of escape from the "boring" nature of state TV. Audience is minimal due to low proficiency of the English language. The Turkmen state controls information and receives income from subscriptions. Starting in 2014, the state started IPTV alternatives. Subscriptions in 2018 cost 10 manats (US$2.80 at official rate, comparable to US $0.50 at the black market rate). Russian and Turkish networks are also available.

The satellite operator ÄlemTV provides a 125-channel service, which is also available over the internet. A 2022 listing posted on Turkmen Portal shows that the bulk of the channels provided are Russian, but it also carries Turkish and Uzbek channels, including channels from the latter's state broadcaster. None of the state-owned Turkmen channels are available in the Sada package, its basic package. The operator is owned by Türkmentelekom. Until 2022, the service was known as Big Bang TV. Beginning 1 August 2023, the operator started selling its access cards on all Türkmenpost branches.

== Channels ==
Name	Content	Launch date
Altyn Asyr (Golden Era)	Broadcasts of political, economic and cultural events and news, meetings, conferences, international exhibitions and events and festivals	7 November 1959
Ýaşlyk (Youth)	Contribution to the education of the young generation with programs for the target audience from elementary school to higher education	1 January 2001
Miras (Inheritance)	Reports on events of cultural life and news with programs on historical and cultural heritage, including the presentation of spirituality, folk art, life and activities of great Turkmen personalities	1 January 2001
Türkmenistan	Foreign service in seven languages (Turkmen, Russian, English, French, Chinese, Arabic and Persian): Focus on the areas of economics, politics, culture, science and education, agriculture, history and sport	12 September 2004
Türkmen Owazy (Turkmen Music)	Music channels for Turkmen music and music programs of different genres; In addition, the program mandate: broadcasts of international cultural events and events that take place or are taking place in the country, feature films related to music	1 January 2009
Aşgabat (Ashgabat)	Regional channel for the capital: reports on politics, economics, culture and spirituality in the capital, preliminary reports on events in the areas of healthcare, education, sports, international meetings and festivals in Ashgabat, as well as general regional information	1 October 2011
Türkmenistan Sport	Preliminary and follow-up reports on all sports “on par with the world’s sports television channels”	1 January 2012
Arkadag	Documents and promotes the “great deeds and achievements of the independent neutral state” with emphasis on the city of Arkadag	1 September 2023
