= Telephone numbers in Turkmenistan =

- Country: Turkmenistan
- Continent: Asia
- NSN length: 8
- Country code: +993
- International access: 8~10
- Long-distance: 8

== Area codes ==
Area	Code	Number length
Ashgabat	12	хх-хх-хх
Arkadag	12	12-57-хх-хх
Ahal Province	1	
Gypjak	1392	хх-хх
Baharly (Bäherden)	131	х-хх-хх
Gökdepe	132	х-хх-хх
Kaka	133	х-хх-хх
Sarahs	134	х-хх-хх
Tejen	135	х-хх-хх
Altyn Asyr	1354	хх-хх
Babadaýhan	136	х-хх-хх
Änew	137	х-хх-хх
Abadan	138	х-хх-хх
Balkan Province	2	
Türkmenbaşy	243 and 2444	(243) х-хх-хх, (2444) хх-хх
Hazar (Çeleken)	240	х-хх-хх
Gumdag	241	х-хх-хх
Etrek (Gyzyletrek)	242	х-хх-хх
Balkanabat	222	х-хх-хх
Esenguly	245	х-хх-хх
Serdar (Gyzylarbat)	246	х-хх-хх
Bereket (Gazanjyk)	247	х-хх-хх
Magtymguly (Garrygala)	248	х-хх-хх
Daşoguz Province	3	
Daşoguz	322	х-хх-хх
Tagta	340	х-хх-хх
Ýylanly	343	х-хх-хх
Akdepe	344	х-хх-хх
Gubadag	345	х-хх-хх
Boldumsaz	346	х-хх-хх
Köneürgenç	347, 360	х-хх-хх
Nyýazow	348	х-хх-хх
Türkmenbaşy	349	х-хх-хх
Lebap Province	4	
Turkmenabat	422	х-хх-хх
Gowurdak	431	х-хх-хх
Nyýazow	432	х-хх-хх
Cärjew (ex-Serdarabat)	433	х-хх-хх
Gazojak	438	х-хх-хх
Çarşaňňy	440	х-хх-хх
Halaç	441	х-хх-хх
Hojambaz	442	х-хх-хх
Garabekewül	443	х-хх-хх
Kerki (ex-Atamyrat)	444	х-хх-хх
Darganata	445	х-хх-хх
Dänew	446	х-хх-хх
Saýat	447	х-хх-хх
Farap	448	х-хх-хх
Sakar	449	х-хх-хх
Seýdi	461	х-хх-хх
Dostluk	465	х-хх-хх
Mary Province	5	
Mary	522	х-хх-хх
Ýagty ýol	557	х-хх-хх
Mollanepes	558	х-хх-хх
Gulanly, Shatlyk	559	х-хх-хх
Ýolöten	560	х-хх-хх
Serhetabat	561	х-хх-хх
Baýramaly	564	х-хх-хх
Murgap	565	х-хх-хх
Sakarçäge	566	х-хх-хх
Tagtabazar	568	х-хх-хх
Türkmengala	569	х-хх-хх

== Mobile phones ==
Operator	Code	Number length
Altyn Asyr	61, 62, 63, 64, 65, 71, 72	хх-хх-хх
Ashgabat City Telephone Network (CDMA)	6020	хх-хх

== Special service numbers ==
Telephone number	Service
01 or 001 on mobile phones	Firefighter
02 or 002 on mobile phones	Police
03 or 003 on mobile phones	Ambulance
04 or 004 on mobile phones	Natural gas safety
082	Car Transportation service number
083 / 084	AŞTU service number
085	Ashgabat International Airport service number
086	Türkmendemirýollary service number
088	Altyn Asyr service number
09	Telephone directory
075	Turkmenpochta service number
123	Arkadag city emergency call centre
