= List of newspapers in Turkmenistan =

Below is a list of newspapers published in Turkmenistan.

- Türkmenistan
- Watan
- Galkynyş
- Nesil
- Edebiýat we sungat
- Türkmenistanyň Prezidentiniň metbugat çapary gazeti
- Adalat
- Esger
- Mugallymlar gazeti
- Türkmen dünýasi
- Bereketli toprak
- Neutral Turkmenistan - English
- Aşgabat
- Ahal
- Türkmen dili
- Daşoguz habarlary
- Türkmen gündogary
- Maru-şahu jahan
- Zaman Türkmenistan
- Habarlar
- Biznes reklama
- Balkan
- Neytralnyy Turkmenistan — Russian
- Nebit-gaz
- Gorogly.com

== Defunct newspapers ==
- Bejrage Sorx
- Izvestiya Askhabadskogo Soveta
