= .tm =

Internet country code top-level domain for Turkmenistan

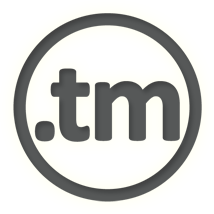
- Introduced: 30 May 1997
- TLD type: Country code top-level domain
- Status: Active
- Registry: NIC.TM (run by Community DNS Ltd)
- Sponsor: TM Domain Registry (CSC Digital Brand Services)
- Intended use: Entities connected with Turkmenistan
- Actual use: Various uses, both in and out of Turkmenistan; sometimes marketed as domain for trademark owners
- Registration restrictions: None for 2nd level registrations; 3rd level registrant must be resident of Turkmenistan
- Structure: Registrations are taken directly at the second level or at third level beneath various 2nd-level labels
- Documents: Terms & Conditions; Rules
- Dispute policies: Dispute Resolution Policy
- DNSSEC: yes
- Registry website: www.nic.tm

.tm is the Internet country code top-level domain (ccTLD) for Turkmenistan. It is operated by Internet Computer Bureau.

Nic.tm offers domain name purchase, registration, management and renewal as well as Internationalized Domain Name registration for entities who wish to register their domain names using local Turkmen language characters.

It has been marketed as a domain for businesses with trademarks, due to the common use of "TM" in this context.

== Registrars ==
Domains can be bought directly from the registry or from accredited registrars. In December 2025 the registry had registrars from 25 countries.

Domains can be transferred between accredited registrars via an Auth-Code.

== Second-level domains ==
Since 2020, domain registration services in Turkmenistan are provided exclusively by the Türkmen Domen Economic Society. Türkmen Domen ES was founded in 2014 under the original name "Coordination Center of the National Domain of Turkmenistan" under the auspices of the Turkmenaragatnashyk Agency. The founders of the enterprise were Turkmentelecom, Altyn Asyr and Ashgabat City Telephone Network.

The total number of domain names registered in Turkmenistan as of November 2023 is 1034. The full list is published on the Türkmen Domen ES website.

=== Generic second-level domains ===
- gov.tm — Turkmen government
- edu.tm — education
- mil.tm — Turkmen military
- co.tm
- net.tm — organizations having to do with the Internet
- com.tm — commercial organizations
