= List of magazines in Turkmenistan =

This is a list of Turkmenistan magazines including those that are no longer published.

- Diýar
- Garagum
- Dünýä edebiýaty
- Zenan kalby
- Güneş
- Wozroždeniýe - in Russian
- Saglyk
- Turkmenistan Sport
- Türkmenistanyň lukmançylygy
- Milli goşun
- Serhetabat Döwletabat
- Oil, gas and mineral resources of Turkmenistan
- Journal of the Ministry of Foreign Affairs of Turkmenistan
- Construction and Architecture of Turkmenistan

== See also ==
- List of newspapers in Turkmenistan
- Media of Turkmenistan

== Links ==
- Turkmen magazines at PDF
