= Watan Habarlary =

Turkmenistani television news program

- Also known as: Watan
- Country of origin: Turkmenistan
- Original language: Turkmen

Production
- Production location: Ashgabat
- Production companies: State Committee of Turkmenistan for Television, Radio Broadcasting and Cinematography

Original release
- Network: Altyn Asyr; Ýaşlyk; Miras; Turkmenistan

Watan Harbalary, also referred to as Watan is a state-run Turkmen national television news program.

== Schedule ==
It is broadcast on three television channels simultaneously at the end of the day.

== Programming ==
The programming is pro-state and aligns with the viewpoint of the Turkmen government and the ruling family. It airs footage showing ex-President Gurbanguly Berdimuhamedov shooting guns, drifting in cars, or riding horses. He is often referred to as "mähriban we gahryman Arkadag", meaning dear and hero Arkadag. The program has been accused of censorship in the form of copyright strikes on western news channels republishing its footage, as well as helping create a cult of personality around Berdimuhamedov.

It uses a YouTube channel to publish news programs to embed into state websites.

== See also ==
- Mass media in Turkmenistan
