= Eslah TV =

Eslah TV تلويزون اصلاح
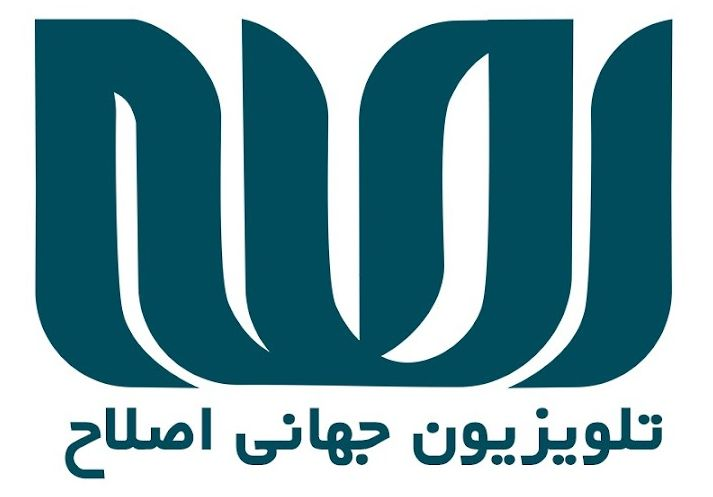
- Country: Afghanistan
- Headquarters: Herat, Afghanistan

Programming
- Language(s): Dari

Ownership
- Owner: ASSRD

History
- Launched: 2013

Links
- Website: Eslah.tv

Eslah TV is an Afghan television station based in Herat launched in 2013. Founded by Khalil Ahmad, it is run by an Afghan organization called Afghan Society for Social Reforms and Development. Its focus is on the social issues of the society and includes a range of Islamic teaching and other educational programs.

Originally broadcast locally to Herat Province, it has expanded and is now available nationwide and abroad on the TürkmenÄlem 52°E / MonacoSAT satellite.
