= Byagul Nurmiradova =

Turkmen politician

Byagul Nurmiradova (born 1971; Turkmen: Bägül Nurmyradowa, Russian: Бягуль Нурмырадова) is a Turkmen politician who previously served as the deputy chairperson for culture of President Gurbanguly Berdimuhamedow's cabinet, equivalent to a vice president in some other countries, until 2014.

Nurmiradova began her career as a television anchor, rising to head the state television channel Miras before being appointed deputy culture minister. After a stint as deputy governor of the Daşoguz Region, she was elevated to the deputy cabinet chair position, which she held for two years.

== Early life and education ==
Byagul Nurmiradova was born Byagul Charykulieva in Anau, Turkmenistan, in 1971.

She studied library science at the Turkmen State Institute of Culture, graduating in 1994.

== Career ==
Nurmiradova first gained national prominence as an anchor on state television. She drew the attention of politicians close to Turkmen President Gurbanguly Berdimuhamedow and in 2004 was promoted to lead the television channel Miras, traveling alongside the president on his international trips and producing reports on the countries they visited.

In 2010, she was appointed deputy culture and broadcasting minister. The following year, she graduated from the National Academy of Public Administration. Also in 2011, she stepped down from the deputy minister post after reportedly clashing with the minister. She subsequently served as deputy khyakim (governor) of the Daşoguz Region, overseeing social and cultural issues, until 2012. In her time as deputy khyakim, she introduced the notable requirement that all women in the region, regardless of their ethnicity, had to wear traditional loose-fitting balak trousers under their skirts. She was described during her tenure as highly exacting, with her specific demands including that only dark-haired children be allowed to greet the president, and she was known to shout obscenities at her subordinates.

In 2012, Berdimuhamedow appointed Nurmiradova as deputy chairperson of his cabinet, a role equivalent to a vice president in some countries, overseeing the culture and media portfolio. She held the position until April 2014, when she was relieved of her duties, citing health reasons. Although some reports circulated that she had died of diabetes at the time, they appeared to be false, and later that year she was reported to be working at the Turkmen State Institute of Culture, her alma mater.
