= Postage stamps and postal history of Turkmenistan =

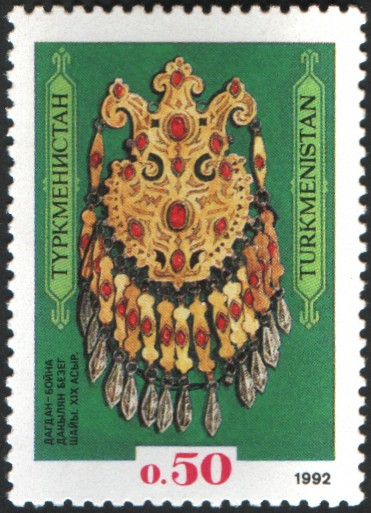
First stamp, 1992

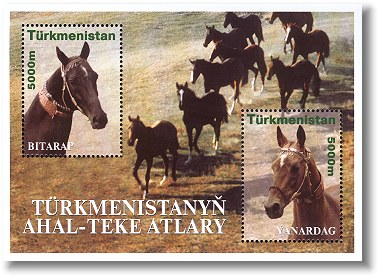
A Turkmenistan miniature sheet from 2001 showing horses

This is a survey of the postage stamps and postal history of Turkmenistan.

Turkmenistan (Turkmen: Türkmenistan), also known as Turkmenia (Russian: Туркмения) is a country in Central Asia. Until 1991, it was a constituent republic of the Soviet Union, the Turkmen Soviet Socialist Republic (Turkmen SSR). It is bordered by Afghanistan to the southeast, Iran to the south and southwest, Uzbekistan to the east and northeast, Kazakhstan to the north and northwest and the Caspian Sea to the west. The national postal administration is Turkmenpochta.

== First stamps ==
The first stamps of Turkmenistan were issued on 26 April 1992. Before then, Turkmenistan used stamps of the Soviet Union.

== Overprints ==
Unlike other ex-Soviet republics, Turkmenistan did not overprint Soviet stamps to meet their postal needs after independence, although a number of overprints were carried out on Turkmenistan stamps in 1992 and 1993.

== Postal services ==
All postal activity is done with the state-owned corporation Turkmenpochta which is under the rule of the Ministry of Communications. The Turkmenistan government exercises close control over postal communications. Parcels and letters are routinely opened by customs officials and delivery is unreliable. Businesses tend to use international couriers such as Federal Express and DHL, although in 2005 these firms were shut down by the government.
