= Romanization of Persian =

Representation of the Persian language with the Latin script

The romanization of Persian (Note: Persian: لاتین‌نِویسی فارسی, romanized: Lâtin-Nevisiye Fârsi, pronounced [lɒːˌtʰiːn neviːˈsiːje fɒːɹˈsiː]) is the representation of the Persian language (Iranian Persian, Dari and Tajik) with the Latin script. Several different romanization schemes exist, each with its own set of rules driven by its own set of ideological goals.

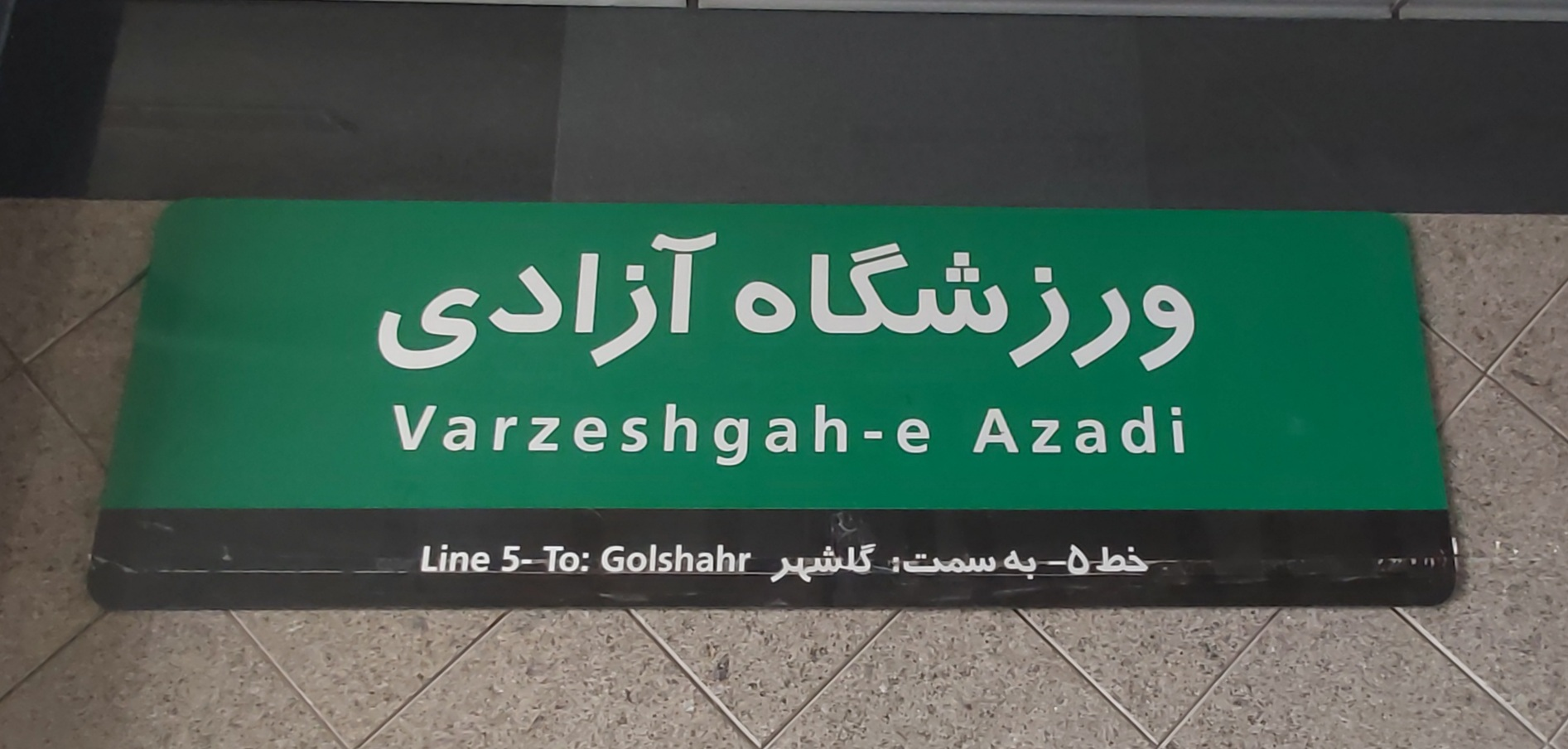
A sign shows the name of a station with both Latin and Persian scripts at Varzeshgah-e Azadi Metro Station.

== Romanization paradigms ==
Because the Persian script is an abjad writing system (with a consonant-heavy inventory of letters), many distinct words in standard Persian can have identical spellings, with widely varying pronunciations that differ in their (unwritten) vowel sounds. Thus a romanization paradigm can follow either transliteration (which mirrors spelling and orthography) or transcription (which mirrors pronunciation and phonology).

=== Transliteration ===
Transliteration (in the strict sense) attempts to be a complete representation of the original writing, so that an informed reader should be able to reconstruct the original spelling of unknown transliterated words. Transliterations of Persian are used to represent individual Persian words or short quotations, in scholarly texts in English or other languages that do not use an abjad.

A transliteration will still have separate representations for different consonants of the Persian alphabet that are pronounced identically in Persian.

Transliterations commonly used in the English-speaking world include BGN/PCGN romanization and ALA-LC Romanization.

Non-academic English-language quotation of Persian words usually uses a simplification of one of the strict transliteration schemes (typically omitting diacritical marks) and/or unsystematic choices of spellings meant to guide English speakers using English spelling rules towards an approximation of the Persian sounds.

=== Transcription ===
Transcriptions of Persian attempt to straightforwardly represent Persian phonology in the Latin script, without requiring a close or reversible correspondence with the Persian script, and also without requiring a close correspondence to English phonetic values of Roman letters.

== Main romanization schemes ==
- DMG (1969), a strict scientific system by the German Oriental Society (Deutsche Morgenländische Gesellschaft). It corresponds to Deutsches Institut für Normung standard DIN 31635.
- ALA-LC (1997), the ALA-LC romanization.
- BGN/PCGN (1958), the BGN/PCGN romanization.
- EI (1960), the system used in early editions of Encyclopædia Iranica.
- EI (2012), its contemporary modification.
- UN (1967), the Iranian national system (1966), that was approved by the UNGEGN in 1967.
- UN (2012), its contemporary modification.

=== Comparison table ===
Consonants
| Unicode | Persian letter | IPA | DMG (1969) | ALA-LC (1997) | BGN/PCGN (1958) | EI (1960) | EI (2012) | UN (1967) | UN (2012) | Pronunciation |
|---|---|---|---|---|---|---|---|---|---|---|
| U+0627 | ا | [ʔ], [∅] (Note: Used as a vowel as well.) | ʾ, — (Note: Hamzeh and eyn are not transliterated at the beginning of words.) | ʼ, — | | | | ʾ | | _____ |
| U+0628 | ب | [b] | b | | | | | | | B as in Bob |
| U+067E | پ | [p] | p | | | | | | | P as in pet |
| U+062A | ت | [t] | t | | | | | | | T as in tall |
| U+062B | ث | [s] | s̱ | | s̄ | t͟h | ṯ | s̄ | s | S as in sand |
| U+062C | ج | [dʒ] | ǧ | j | | d͟j | j | | | J as in jam |
| U+0686 | چ | [tʃ] | č | ch | | č | | ch | č | Ch as in Charlie |
| U+062D | ح | [h] | ḥ | | ḩ/ḥ (Note: The dot below may be used instead of cedilla.) | ḥ | | ḩ | h | H as in holiday |
| U+062E | خ | [x] | ḫ | kh | | k͟h | ḵ | kh | x | Spanish J (as in jalapeño) |
| U+062F | د | [d] | d | | | | | | | D as in Dave |
| U+0630 | ذ | [z] | ẕ | | z̄ | d͟h | ḏ | z̄ | z | Z as in zero |
| U+0631 | ر | [r] | r | | | | | | | R as in rabbit |
| U+0632 | ز | [z] | z | | | | | | | Z as in zero |
| U+0698 | ژ | [ʒ] | ž | zh | | z͟h | ž | zh | ž | S as in television or G as in genre |
| U+0633 | س | [s] | s | | | | | | | S as in Sam |
| U+0634 | ش | [ʃ] | š | sh | | s͟h | š | sh | š | Sh as in sheep |
| U+0635 | ص | [s] | ṣ | | ş/ṣ | ṣ | | ş | s | S as in Sam |
| U+0636 | ض | [z] | ż | z̤ | ẕ | ḍ | ż | ẕ | z | Z as in zero |
| U+0637 | ط | [t] | ṭ | | ţ/ṭ | ṭ | | ţ | t | t as in tank |
| U+0638 | ظ | [z] | ẓ | | z̧/ẓ | ẓ | | z̧ | z | Z as in zero |
| U+0639 | ع | [ʔ] | ʿ | ʻ | ʼ | ʻ | | ʿ | | glottal stop, as between syllables in 'uh-oh' |
| U+063A | غ | [ɢ]~[ɣ] | ġ | gh | | g͟h | ḡ | gh | q | somewhat resembling French R |
| U+0641 | ف | [f] | f | | | | | | | F as in Fred |
| U+0642 | ق | [ɢ]~[ɣ] | q | | | ḳ | | q | | somewhat resembling French R |
| U+06A9 | ک | [k] | k | | | | | | | K as in key |
| U+06AF | گ | [ɡ] | g | | | | | | | G as in go |
| U+0644 | ل | [l] | l | | | | | | | L as in lamp |
| U+0645 | م | [m] | m | | | | | | | M as in Michael |
| U+0646 | ن | [n] | n | | | | | | | N as in name |
| U+0648 | و | [v]~[w] (Note: At the beginning of words the combination ⟨خو⟩ was pronounced /xw/ or /xʷ/ in Classical Persian. In modern varieties the glide /ʷ/ has been lost, though the spelling has not been changed. It may be still heard in Dari as a relict pronunciation. The combination /xʷa/ was changed to /xo/ (see below).) | v | | | | v, w (Note: In Dari.) | v | | V as in vision |
| U+0647 | ه | [h] | h | | h (Note: Not transliterated at the end of words.) | h | | h | | H as in hot |
| U+06CC | ی | [j] | y | | | | | | | Y as in Yale |

Vowels (Note: Diacritical signs (harekat) are rarely written.)
| Unicode | Final | Medial | Initial | Isolated | IPA | DMG (1969) | ALA-LC (1997) | BGN/PCGN (1958) | EI (2012) | UN (1967) | UN (2012) | Pronunciation |
|---|---|---|---|---|---|---|---|---|---|---|---|---|
| U+064E | ـَ | | اَ | | [æ] | a | | | | | | A as in cat |
| U+064F | ـُ | | اُ | | [o] | o | | | u | o | | O as in go |
| U+0648 U+064F | ـو | | — | | [o] (Note: After ⟨خ⟩ from the earlier /xʷa/. Often transliterated as xwa or xva. For example, خور /xor/ 'sun' was /xʷar/ in Classical Persian.) | o | | | u | o | | O as in go |
| U+0650 | ـِ | | اِ | | [e] | e | i | e | | | | E as in ten |
| U+064E U+0627 | ـَا | | آ | | [ɑː~ɒː] | ā | | | | | | O as in hot |
| U+0622 | ـآ | | آ | | [ɑː~ɒː] | ā, ʾā (Note: After vowels.) | ā, ʼā | ā | | | | O as in hot |
| U+064E U+06CC | ـَی | — | | | [ɑː~ɒː] | ā | á | | ā | á | ā | O as in hot |
| U+06CC U+0670 | ـیٰ | — | | | [ɑː~ɒː] | ā | á | | ā | | | O as in hot |
| U+064F U+0648 | ـُو | | اُو | | [uː, oː] | ū | | | u, ō | ū | u | U as in actual |
| U+0650 U+06CC | ـِی | ـِیـ | اِیـ | اِی | [iː, eː] | ī | | | i, ē | ī | i | Y as in happy |
| U+064E U+0648 | ـَو | | اَو | | [ow~aw] | au | aw | ow | ow, aw | ow | | O as in go |
| U+064E U+06CC | ـَی | ـَیـ | اَیـ | اَی | [ej~aj] | ai | ay | ey | ey, ay | ey | | Ay as in play |
| U+064E U+06CC | ـیِ | — | | | [–e], [–je] | –e, –ye | –i, –yi | –e, –ye | | | | Ye as in yes |
| U+06C0 | ـهٔ | — | | | [–je] | –ye | –ʼi | –ye | | | | Ye as in yes |

=== Antiquity ===
In antiquity, Old and Middle Persian employed various scripts including Old Persian cuneiform, Pahlavi and Avestan scripts. For each period there are established transcriptions and transliterations by prominent linguists.

| IPA | Old Persian (Note: Slash signifies equal variants.) (Note: There exist some differences in transcription of Old Persian preferred by different scholars: ā = â; ī, ū = i, u; x = kh, ḵ, ḥ, ḫ; c/č = ǩ; j/ǰ = ǧ; θ = ϑ, þ, th, ṯ, ṭ; ç = tr, θʳ, ϑʳ, ṙ, s͜s, s̀; f = p̱; y, v = j, w.) | Middle Persian (Pahlavi) | Avestan |
|---|---|---|---|
Consonants
| p | p | | |
| f | f | | |
| b | b | | |
| β~ʋ~w | — | β | β/w |
| t | t | | t, t̰ |
| θ | θ/ϑ | | |
| d | d | | |
| ð | — | (δ) | δ |
| θr | ç/ϑʳ | θʳ/ϑʳ | |
| s | s | | |
| z | z | | |
| ʃ | š | | š, š́, ṣ̌ |
| ʒ | ž | | |
| c~tʃ | c/č | | |
| ɟ~dʒ | j/ǰ | | |
| k | k | | |
| x | x | | x, x́ |
| xʷ | xʷ/xᵛ | | |
| g | g | | g, ġ |
| ɣ | ɣ/γ | | |
| h | h | | |
| m | m | | m, m̨ |
| ŋ | — | | ŋ, ŋʷ |
| ŋʲ | — | | ŋ́ |
| n | n | | n, ń, ṇ |
| r | r | | |
| l | l | | |
| w~ʋ~v | v | w | v |
| j | y | | y, ẏ |
Vowels
Short
| a | a | | |
| ã | — | | ą, ą̇ |
| ə | — | | ə |
| e | — | (e) | e |
| i | i | | |
| o | — | (o) | o |
| u | u | | |
Long
| aː | ā | | |
| ɑː~ɒː | — | | å/ā̊ |
| ə | — | | ə̄ |
| əː | — | ē | |
| iː | ī | | |
| oː | — | ō | |
| uː | ū | | |

Notes:

A sample romanization (a poem by the Persian poet Hâfez):

| Persian Rūmi | Perso-Arabic script | English |
|---|---|---|
| Yusefê gomgaşte báz áyad be Kanân qam maħor kolbeye ahzán şavad ruzi golestán qam maħor | یوسف گم گشته باز آید به کنعان غم مخور کلبه‌ی احزان شود روزی گلستان غم مخور | The lost Joseph will get back to Canaan, don't be sad The hut of madness will become a garden one day, don't be sad |

== Other romanization schemes ==
=== Baháʼí Persian romanization ===
Baháʼís use a system standardized by Shoghi Effendi, which he initiated in a general letter on March 12, 1923. The Baháʼí transliteration scheme was based on a standard adopted by the Tenth International Congress of Orientalists which took place in Geneva in September 1894. Shoghi Effendi changed some details of the Congress's system, most notably in the use of digraphs in certain cases (e.g. s͟h instead of š).

A detailed introduction to the Baháʼí Persian romanization can usually be found at the back of a Baháʼí scripture.

=== ASCII Internet romanizations ===
| Persian | Fingilish |
|---|---|
| آ،ا | a, â |
| ب | b |
| پ | p |
| ت | t |
| ث | s |
| ج | j |
| چ | ch, č |
| ح | h |
| خ | kh, x |
| د | d |
| ذ | z |
| ر | r |
| ز | z |
| ژ | zh, ž |
| س | s |
| ش | sh, š |
| ص | s |
| ض | z |
| ط | t |
| ظ | z |
| ع،ء | a, ə |
| غ | gh, q |
| ف | f |
| ق | gh, q |
| ک | k |
| گ | g |
| ل | l |
| م | m |
| ن | n |
| و | o, u, v, w |
| ه | h |
| ی | i, y |

It is common to write Persian language with only the Latin alphabet (as opposed to the Persian alphabet) especially in online chat, social networks, emails and SMS. It has developed and spread due to a former lack of software supporting the Persian alphabet, and/or due to a lack of knowledge about the software that was available. Although Persian writing is supported in recent operating systems, there are still many cases where the Persian alphabet is unavailable and there is a need for an alternative way to write Persian with the basic Latin alphabet. This way of writing is sometimes called Fingilish or Pingilish (a portmanteau of Fârsi or Persian and English). In most cases this is an ad hoc simplification of the scientific systems listed above (such as ALA-LC or BGN/PCGN), but ignoring any special letters or diacritical signs. The details of the spelling also depend on the contact language of the speaker; for example, the vowel [u] is often spelt "oo" after English, but Persian speakers from Germany and some other European countries are more likely to use "u".

=== Persian alphabet based on Latin in USSR ===
In the USSR from 1931 to 1938, the Persian alphabet based on Latin was used. It was used for teaching in schools, the Bejraqe Sorx (Red Banner) newspaper was published in Ashgabat, as well as textbooks and other literature.

| A a آ | B в ب | C c چ | Ç ç ج | D d د | E e اِ | Ә ә اَ | F f ف | G g گ | H h ﻫ ,ح |
| I i اِى | J j ى | K k ک | L ʟ ل | M m م | N n ن | O o اُ | P p پ | Q q ق ,غ | R r ر |
| S s ث ,س ,ص | Ş ş ش | T t ت ,ط | U u او | V v و | X x خ | Z z ز ,ذ ظ ,ض | Ƶ ƶ ژ | ' ع , ٴ |

=== Tajik Latin alphabet ===
The Tajik language or Tajik Persian is a variety of the Persian language. It was written in the Tajik SSR in a standardized Latin script from 1926 until the late 1930s, when the script was officially changed to Cyrillic. As a result of these factors romanization schemes of the Tajik Cyrillic script follow rather different principles. Even though it is largely unused, Google Translate implements the alphabet as the Latin transliteration for Tajik.

The Tajik alphabet in Latin (1928-1940)
| A a | B ʙ | C c | Ç ç | D d | E e | F f | G g | Ƣ ƣ | H h | I i | Ī ī |
| /a/ | /b/ | /tʃ/ | /dʒ/ | /d/ | /e/ | /f/ | /ɡ/ | /ʁ/ | /h/ | /i/ | /ˈi/ |
| J j | K k | L l | M m | N n | O o | P p | Q q | R r | S s | Ş ş | T t |
| /j/ | /k/ | /l/ | /m/ | /n/ | /o/ | /p/ | /q/ | /ɾ/ | /s/ | /ʃ/ | /t/ |
| U u | Ū ū | V v | X x | Z z | Ƶ ƶ | ʼ |
| /u/ | /ɵ/ | /v/ | /χ/ | /z/ | /ʒ/ | /ʔ/ |

=== Variation proposed by Mir Shamsuddin Adib-Soltani ===
A variation (that is sometimes called "Pârstin") proposed by linguist Mir Shamsuddin Adib-Soltani in 1976 has seen some use by other linguists, such as David Neil MacKenzie for the transliteration of the Persian scripture.

The letters of this variation of the Latin alphabet are the basic Latin letters: Aa, Bb, Cc, Dd, Ee, Ff, Gg, Hh, Ii, Jj, Kk, Ll, Mm, Nn, Oo, Pp, Qq, Rr, Ss, Tt, Uu, Vv, Xx, Yy, Zz, plus the additional letters to support the native sounds: Ââ, Čč, Šš, Žž (the latter three from Slavic alphabets, like the Czech one).

Besides being one of the simplest variations proposed for the Latinization of the Persian alphabet, this variation is based on the Alphabetic principle. Based on this principle, each individual speech sound is represented by a single letter and there is a one-to-one correspondence between sounds and the letters that represent them. This principle, besides increasing the clarity of the text and preventing confusion for the reader, is specifically useful for representing the native sounds of the Persian language, for which there are no equivalents in most other languages written in a Latin-based alphabet. For instance, compound letters used in the other variations, such as kh and gh, in addition to sh and zh are respectively represented by x, q, š and ž.

== See also ==
- Persian alphabet
- Persian phonology
- Romanization of Syriac
- List of English words of Persian origin
- Zabân-e Pâk, a 1944 treatise by Ahmad Kasravi, proposing reforms to Persian including writing it in the Latin script.
