= Altyn Asyr (payment system) =

Turkmen card scheme

Altyn Asyr "Altyn asyr" bank karty
- Industry: Bank card
- Founded: 2001; 25 years ago
- Headquarters: Ashgabat, Turkmenistan
- Area served: Turkmenistan
- Products: Debit cards, credit cards, payment systems
- Services: card processing
- Parent: Central Bank of Turkmenistan

Altyn Asyr (lit. 'Golden age') is a Turkmenistani domestic card scheme founded in 2001 by the Central Bank of Turkmenistan. The Altyn Asyr system is an integral part of Turkmenistan's payment infrastructure. Altyn Asyr offers financial services, including credit card, debit card, and prepaid card issuing and network processing.

The card allows for cashless payments for communication services, utility and electricity bills, as well as credit and deposit transactions and electronic money transfers between holders of plastic cards from other payment systems. The processing center for the Altyn Asyr payment system, which integrates all financial institutions in Turkmenistan, is located within JSCB Halkbank.

== History ==
An example of the front of a typical debit card: 1. Issuing bank logo; 2. EMV chip; 3. Hologram; 4. Card number; 5. Card brand logo; 6. Expiration date; 7. Cardholder's name

An example of the reverse side of a typical debit card: 1. Magnetic stripe; 2. Signature strip; 3. Card Security Code

The implementation of the Altyn Asyr payment system was initiated in 2001 by the Central Bank of Turkmenistan. The objective was to integrate the existing local card systems, Turkmenkart and Millikart, operated by Turkmen banks, and to assist other banks in joining a unified payment system. By the end of 2001, all three systems became fully compatible. Enterprises and organizations of all forms of ownership engaged in the sale of goods and services for cash were permitted to enter into agreements with Turkmen acquiring banks to accept and service payment cards for cashless transactions.

Initially, the primary holders of cards from the national payment system Altyn Asyr were employees of state-funded institutions. Over time, students, pensioners, and recipients of various government benefits also joined the system.

In 2009, the transition from a magnetic stripe card to a smart card took place.

In June 2015, Turkmenistan launched a unified cashless payment system, integrating existing payment platforms to enhance convenience and speed for financial transactions. The system allows holders of all types of plastic cards to use any ATM or payment terminal nationwide, regardless of their bank affiliation. Previously, the country operated separate systems: the local Altyn Asyr system and The State Bank for Foreign Economic Affairs of Turkmenistan system, which supported Millikart and international VISA cards. Transactions were limited to authorized banks, causing inconvenience for users. The unified system also introduced a 24/7 call center to provide technical and informational support to customers.

In 2017, all banks in Turkmenistan launched an Internet banking service for the national payment system Altyn Asyr.

In 2022, Turkmenistan introduced fare payment with Altyn Asyr bank cards on urban public transport. To pay for their ride, passengers simply need to tap their bank cards on validators installed on the handrails near the entrance doors. To pay for their ride, passengers can use bank cards with an embedded microprocessor (chip) and a contactless interface by simply tapping them on validators installed on the handrails near the entrance doors.

In 2023, Turkmenistan launched a banking service for contactless payments using NFC and QR codes.

As of November 1, 2024, the number of bank-issued plastic cards in circulation exceeded 5,940,049. There are 2,138 ATMs installed across the country.

With the growing number of bank cards among the population, the widespread use of payment terminals has also continued to increase. While initially, card payment options were mostly available in chain supermarkets and a few large stores, by 2024, the number of bank card payment terminals (POS terminals) across the country had reached 40,335. The major banks offer cashback services for cardholders.

== Customers ==
Banks that use Altyn Asyr's services are:

Bank	Number of Bank Cards
State Commercial Bank of Turkmenistan "Turkmenistan"	1,132,497
Joint-Stock Commercial Bank of Turkmenistan "Turkmenbashi"	656,780
Joint-Stock Commercial Bank of Turkmenistan "Halkbank"	763,757
State Commercial Bank of Turkmenistan "Daikhanbank"	2,074,190
Joint-Stock Bank "Senagat"	492,738
Turkmen-Turkish Joint-Stock Commercial Bank	132,268
Joint-Stock Commercial Bank "Rysgall"	191,160
State Bank for Foreign Economic Affairs of Turkmenistan	496,659
Total	5,940,049

== Products and services ==
Altyn Asyr produces bank cards and mobile wallet applications for local transactions within Turkmenistan. Altyn asyr payment cards are accepted in merchandise stores and government organizations across Turkmenistan, in addition to online Turkmen e-commerce websites.

== See also ==
- Banking in Turkmenistan
- Credit card
- List of companies of Turkmenistan
- Payment service provider
- E-commerce payment system
