= TürkmenÄlem 52°E / MonacoSAT =

Turkmenistan's first satellite

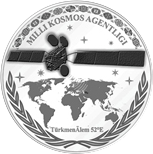
- Mission type: Communications
- Operator: Turkmenistan National Space Agency; Principality of Monaco (orbital slot)
- COSPAR ID: 2015-023A
- SATCAT no.: 40617
- Mission duration: 15 years

Spacecraft properties
- Bus: Spacebus-4000C2
- Manufacturer: Thales Alenia Space
- Launch mass: 4,707 kilograms (10,377 lb)

Start of mission
- Launch date: 27 April 2015, 23:03 UTC
- Rocket: Falcon 9 v1.1
- Launch site: Cape Canaveral SLC-40
- Contractor: SpaceX

Orbital parameters
- Reference system: Geocentric
- Regime: Geostationary
- Longitude: 52° East
- Eccentricity: 0.0001353
- Perigee altitude: 35,775 kilometres (22,230 mi)
- Apogee altitude: 35,786 kilometres (22,236 mi)
- Inclination: 0.03 degrees
- Period: 1435.81 minutes
- Epoch: 7 May 2015, 02:24:00 UTC

TürkmenÄlem 52°E / MonacoSAT is a communications satellite operated by Turkmenistan National Space Agency, built by Thales Alenia Space in the Cannes Mandelieu Space Center in France. Launched from Cape Canaveral on 27 April 2015 aboard a Falcon 9 v1.1 rocket, the satellite operates at 52°E in the geostationary orbit and has an anticipated service life of 15 years. The position is controlled by the Principality of Monaco and the satellite includes 12 transponders that are referred to and commercialised as MonacoSAT as well as the 26 transponders referred to as TürkmenÄlem.

Wide Network Solutions is the satellite's biggest commercial operator.

== History ==
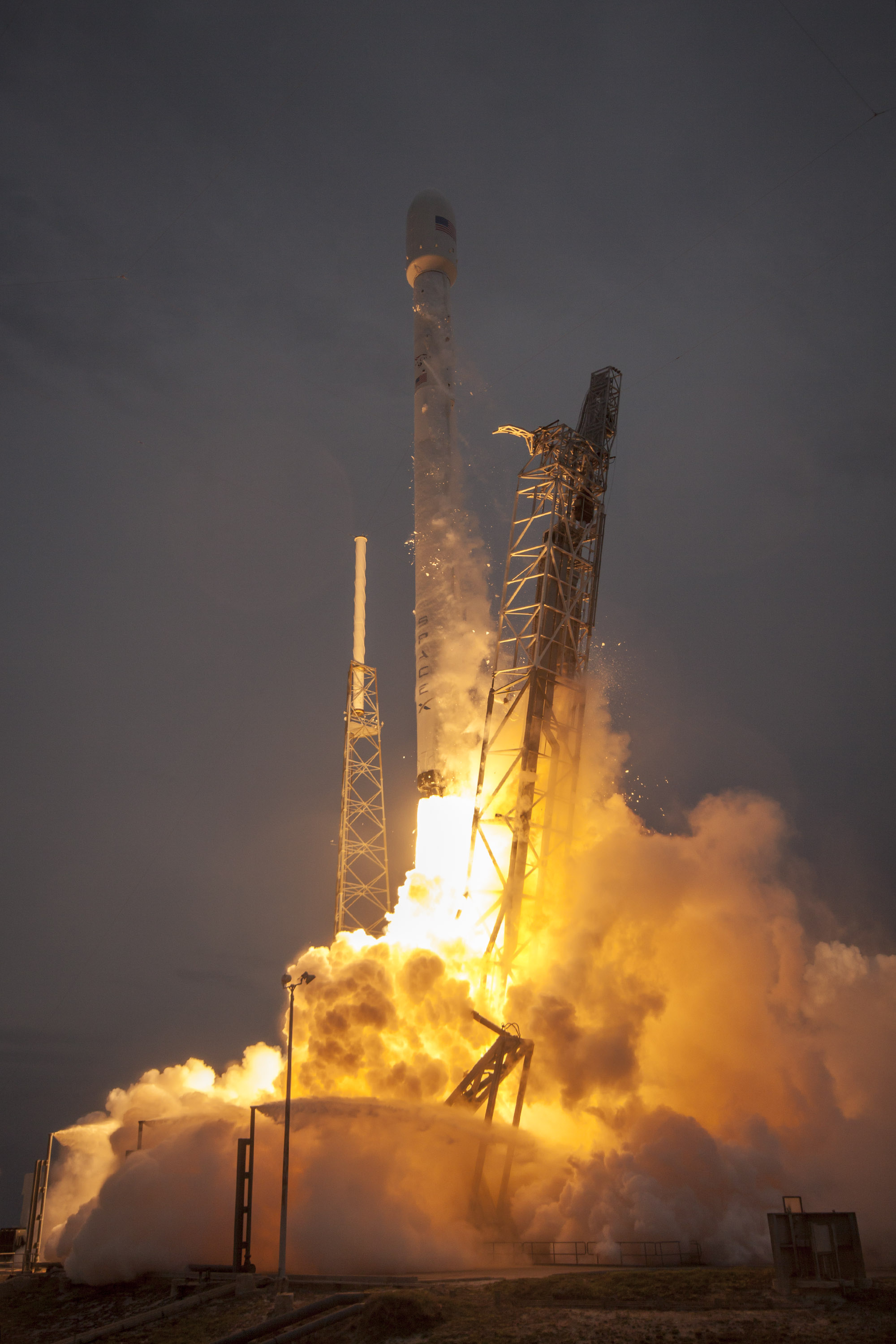
Launch of Falcon 9 carrying TürkmenÄlem 52°E / MonacoSAT

In 2009, Space Systems International - Monaco (SSI-Monaco) signed a license agreement with the Monaco government for the development and use of the 52°E orbital position for the MonacoSAT project. In November 2011, the Turkmenistan Ministry of Communications signed agreements with Thales Alenia Space to build the first TurkmenSpace satellite of the Turkmenistan NSSC (National System of Satellite Communications) programme, and with SSI-Monaco to use the 52°E position, including the right for SSI-Monaco to use 12 Ku-band transponders on the satellite as MonacoSAT. In July 2013, global satellite operator SES and SSI-Monaco signed an agreement for SES to commercialise the 12 MonacoSAT transponders and integrate MonacoSAT into the SES fleet.

The satellite was originally intended to be launched on a Chinese Long March 3B rocket but International Traffic in Arms Regulations prevented some US made parts being exported to China for the launch, and so in June 2013 it was switched to a SpaceX Falcon 9 v1.1 launcher, and planned for late 2014/early 2015.

The launch was initially scheduled for 21 March 2015 but this was delayed to study a problem with a helium pressurisation system on the Falcon 9 rocket, and a new launch date was set for no earlier than 24 April 2015. SpaceX clarified the reason for the delay: "the issue wasn’t with the [helium] bottles themselves, but rather other bottles from a similar lot that failed testing at the company’s assembly plant. We identified a potential condition that could be shared with those on board the Thales vehicle." The subsequent launch on 27 April 2015 successfully positioned the satellite at 52°E.

Formerly referred to as TurkmenSat 1, it was Turkmenistan's first official satellite.

== Coverage ==
The TürkmenÄlem 52°E / MonacoSAT satellite has 38 Ku-band transponders providing coverage in Europe, the Middle East, Africa and Asia with three downlink beams:

- The West beam is centred on Turkmenistan, Kazakhstan and Uzbekistan with 53 dbW power providing reception on dishes down to about 50 cm. The beam extends at lower powers north east across Russia, north across Scandinavia to Svalbard and west across Europe to the Atlantic with a second high power lobe over France and southern UK.
- The East beam is also centred on Turkmenistan, Kazakhstan and Uzbekistan with a slightly reduced power (52 dBW) and extends west across central and northern Europe with a second 52 dBW lobe over north west France.
- The MENA beam is centred on the Arabian Peninsula and North Africa (Libya) with a maximum power of 51 dBW, and extends as far south as Sudan and Ethiopia.

== MonacoSAT ==
The MonacoSAT payload of 12 Ku-band transponders commercialised by SES provides capacity for DTH broadcasting over the Middle East and North Africa, in addition to resources for trunking and data services in Europe, the Middle East, North Africa and Central Asia. In particular, MonacoSAT provides growth potential for the Abu Dhabi-based Yahsat and SES joint venture bouquet YahLive, additional to the broadcasts from YahSat 1A at the adjacent orbital position of 52.5°E.

The sole and only commercialisation of this satellite is by Wide Network Solutions. WNS is the only and most active provider in Persian market for this satellite

== Numismatics ==
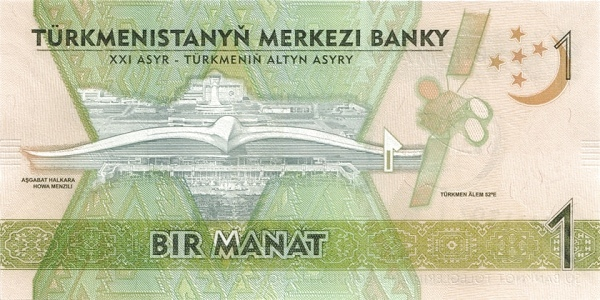
1 manat (2017)

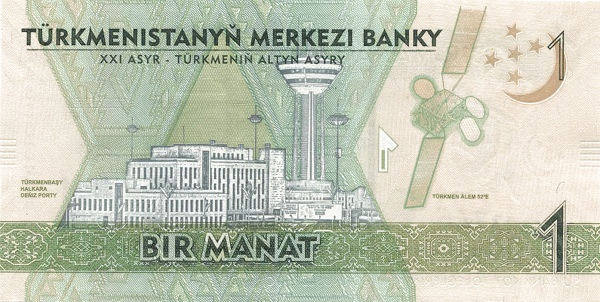
1 manat (2020)

Since 2017 the TürkmenÄlem 52°E appears on the reverse of the banknote of 1 Turkmen manat.

== See also ==
- Telecommunications in Turkmenistan
- Telecommunications in Monaco
- SES
- SpaceX
- List of Falcon 9 launches
