= Ýaşlyk =

State-owned television channel in Turkmenistan

- Country: Turkmenistan
- Broadcast area: Turkmenistan
- Headquarters: Ashgabat, Turkmenistan

Programming
- Language: Turkmen
- Picture format: 16:9 HDTV

Ownership
- Owner: State Committee of Turkmenistan on TV, Radio and Film

History
- Launched: 1 January 2001
- Former names: TMT-2

Links
- Website: http://tdh.gov.tm/

Ýaşlyk (Turkmen pronunciation: [jɑːʃˈlɯq], 'Youth' in Turkmen) is one of the eight state-owned television channels of Turkmenistan. Programming on the network is in the Turkmen language and aims primarily at the development of the youth of the country.

The channel broadcasts from 08:00 to 22:00 (on average) and transmits all editions of Watan Habarlary along with Altyn Asyr and Miras. Programming includes educational content, entertainment, animated films and the game show 1/10 - Ondan Bir. The channel also has a protocol with Unicef.

== History ==
Before 2001, the channel was known as TMT2. By 1999, the channel was already available on satellite on the Gorizont-32 satellite alongside its sister channels, TMT1 and TMT3.

In May 2012, Begenç Abaýew was appointed director of the channel.

== See also ==
- Mass media in Turkmenistan
