= List of companies of Turkmenistan =

Turkmenistan is a sovereign country in Central Asia bordered by Kazakhstan to the northwest, Uzbekistan to the north and east, Afghanistan to the southeast, Iran to the south and southwest and the Caspian Sea to the west.

== Notable firms ==
This list includes notable companies with primary headquarters located in the country. The industry and sector follow the Industry Classification Benchmark taxonomy. Organizations which have ceased operations are included and noted as defunct.

Notable companies Status: P=Private, S=State; A=Active, D=Defunct
Name	Industry	Sector	Headquarters	Founded	Notes	Status	
Demirýollary	Industrials	Railroads	Ashgabat	2020	Railroads	S	A
MTS Turkmenistan	Telecommunications	Mobile phone telecommunications	Ashgabat	1994	Telecom	P	D
Türkmengaz	Oil & gas	Exploration & production	Ashgabat	1997	State petrochemical	S	A
Türkmennebit	Oil & gas	Exploration & production	Ashgabat	?	State petrochemical	S	A
O′zbekiston Pochtasi	Industrials	Delivery services	Ashgabat	1993	Postal services	S	A
