= Izvestiya Askhabadskogo Soveta =

Russian communist newspaper (1918)

Izvestiya Soveta rabochikh i soldatskikh deputatov goroda Askhabada
- Type: Daily
- Editor: Kuleshov
- Founded: January 17, 1918
- Ceased publication: c. May–July 1918
- Political alignment: Communism
- Language: Russian language
- City: Askhabad
- Country: Russia

Izvestiya Soveta rabochikh i soldatskikh deputatov goroda Askhabada (Russian: Известия Совета рабочих и солдатских депутатов города Асхабада, 'News of the Council of Workers and Soldiers Deputies of the City of Askhabad'), colloquially referred to as Izvestiya Askhabadskogo Soveta (Известия Асхабадского Совета, 'Askhabad Soviet News'), was a Russian language Bolshevik newspaper published in the first half of 1918 in Askhabad, Transcaspian Oblast, Soviet Russia (present-day Ashgabat, Turkmenistan).

== Foundation ==
The first issue of the Askhabad Izvestiya was published on January 17, 1918. Izvestiya became the first Bolshevik newspaper in the Transcaspian Oblast (present-day Turkmenistan). It was launched on the initiative of the Bolshevik faction in the Askhabad Soviet, to challenge the influence of the Menshevik newspaper Askhabadski Novosti, and to support Bolshevik agitation among workers and demobilized soldiers. The editorial board included: Kuleshov (editor), N. G. Ssorin (editorial secretary) and V. M. Batminov. According to a later account by Ssorin, the real organizer behind the newspaper was Batminov, who mobilized the resources for the publication and would sleep in the editorial office (which also functioned as the office of the Bolshevik Soviet faction). The editorial board of the newspaper was also closely connected to the Tashkent newspaper Nasha Gazeta.

Izvestiya Askhabadskogo Soveta provided news coverage about the situation in the Transcaspian Oblast and Soviet Russia. Copies of the newspaper could be sold easily as the newspaper carried articles from central newspapers, and decrees from the Askhabad Soviet, which its main competitor Askhabad did not. Izvestiya was published daily, with copies usually having two pages. Publishing the newspaper was made difficult due to paper shortages.

== Struggle over the Askhabad Soviet ==
The newspaper had a Bolshevik political line in spite of the fact that the Askhabad Soviet was controlled by Mensheviks and Socialist Revolutionaries. Around the time of the October Revolution, there was a power struggle between the three parties in the Askhabad Soviet. The Mensheviks and Socialist-Revolutionaries had an absolute majority in the Executive Committee of the Askhabad Soviet.

Izvestiya played an important role in disseminating Bolshevik propaganda, gaining a wide readership among workers. The newspaper charged the Menshevik-Socialist Revolutionary leadership of the Askhabad Soviet with opportunism. The Menshevik-Socialist Revolutionary leadership of the Askhabad Soviet made repeated attempts to oust the Bolsheviks from the editorial board of Izvestiya, but failed. Eventually the Bolsheviks prevailed in the struggle over the Askhabad Soviet, and managed to get Batminov elected as the soviet chairman.

== Closure ==
The exact date when Izvestiya was discontinued is not known by historians. In 1933 the publication Shuralar Turkmenistan mentioned that the final issue of the newspaper would have been its 77th issue, which presumably would have meant that the last issue would have been published on May 15 [O.S. May 1] 1918. But according to Annakurdov there is evidence that the newspaper would have continued publication until mid-1918, and assumed that the publication was discontinued due to the counter-revolutionary coup in July 1918. Batminov was one of the Bolshevik leaders in Askhabad executed by White Guards on July 23, 1918. Only a handful of copies of Izvestiya have survived in archives.
