= Turkmenistan National Space Agency =

- «Türkmenaragatnaşyk» agentliginiň Kosmos müdirligi

Agency overview
- Abbreviation: TNSA
- Formed: 2011
- Type: Space agency
- Administrator: Ashir Garayev
- Website: http://www.turkmencosmos.gov.tm

Turkmenistan National Space Agency (Turkmen: «Türkmenaragatnaşyk» agentliginiň Kosmos müdirligi) is a governmental body that coordinates all Turkmenistan space research programs with scientific and commercial goals. It was established in 2011. In 2019, transferred to the jurisdiction of the Turkmenaragatnashyk Agency.

== Space programme ==
In 2011, Turkmenistan space industry boosted as new agency set up under the state program for development of space industry after President Gurbanguly Berdimuhamedow's approval.

In January 2019, the distinguished President of Turkmenistan Gurbanguly Berdimuhamedov signed a Resolution, according to which the National Space Agency under the President of Turkmenistan (TNSA; Turkmen: Türkmenistanyň prezidentiň ýanynda Milli kosmos agentligi) was transferred to the jurisdiction of the Turkmenaragatnashyk Agency of the Ministry of Industry and Communication of Turkmenistan and renamed to the Space Administration of this agency.

== Satellites ==
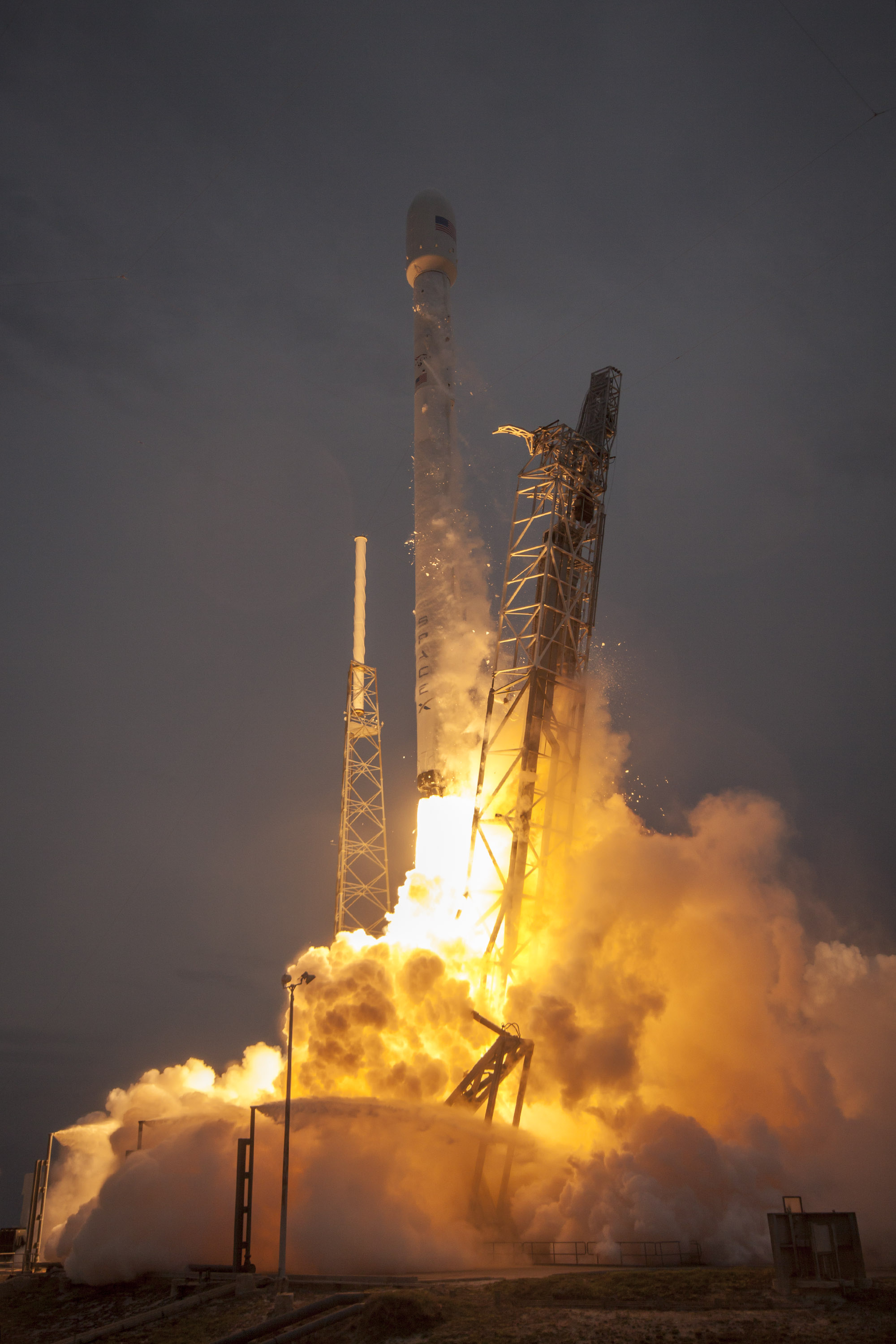
Launch of Falcon 9 carrying TürkmenÄlem 52°E / MonacoSAT

Turkmenistan contracted the Thales Alenia Space group to manufacture its first satellite launched into geosynchronous orbit in March 2015.

=== TurkmenAlem52E/MonacoSAT ===
TurkmenAlem52E/MonacoSAT is a geosynchronous orbit (GSO) communication satellite initially intended to be Turkmenistan's first satellite. Built by Thales Alenia Space, and contracted to launch aboard a SpaceX Falcon 9 launch vehicle in March 2015, the satellite has an anticipated service life of 15 years. The satellite will cover Europe and significant part of Asian countries and Africa and will have transmission for TV, radio broadcasting and the internet.

The satellite's operations will be controlled by a state-run Turkmenistan National Space Agency.

== See also ==
- List of government space agencies

== Links ==
- Official web-site
