= Turkmenistan State News Agency =

State-owned news agency in Turkmenistan

- Native name: Türkmenistanyň Döwlet habarlar agentligi
- Company type: Agency
- Industry: News media
- Founded: 1924
- Headquarters: Ashgabat, Turkmenistan
- Key people: Merdan Gazakbaýew
- Products: Wire service
- Owner: Government of Turkmenistan
- Website: tdh.gov.tm

The Turkmenistan State News Agency (Turkmen: Türkmenistanyň Döwlet habarlar agentligi), sometimes shortened to TDH, is the state-owned news agency in Turkmenistan. TDH headquarters are in Bitarap Turkmenistan Avenue, Ashgabat. The agency publishes news and analysis of the socio-political, socio-economic, cultural and sporting life of the state in Turkmen, Russian and English languages. Agency specialists are engaged in the development, technical and information support, and promotion of web sites relating to the culture of Turkmenistan. The current editor-in-chief of TDH is Bekdurdy Amansaryev. Two small, private news agencies, Infoabad and Arzuw, also exist.

== History ==
=== Soviet era ===
The Telegraph Agency of Turkmenistan was opened in 1924, shortly after the declaration of Ashgabat as the capital of the Turkmen SSR. On 12 December 1925 it was renamed to the Turkmen Telegraph Agency (TurkmenTAG) with the status of a republican organ of the Telegraph Agency of the Soviet Union (TASS). In the mid-1970s, it was renamed to the Turkmeninform News Agency.

=== Independence ===
TDH was established in 1991 in independent Turkmenistan. In 1992, it was renamed the State News Agency Turkmen-Press simultaneously with the separation from the TASS structure. On May 4, 2000, it was renamed into the Turkmen State Information Service "Turkmendovlethabarlary" (Turkmen: Türkmen Döwlet habar gullugy). In November 2013, TDH launched a redesigned website which provides the function of Turkmen TV streaming. This project has been jointly prepared by the Ministry of Communications and is the only one in Turkmenistan. On November 20, 2014 it was renamed the State News Agency of Turkmenistan (TDH).

== Directors of TDH ==
No	Name	Term Start	Term End	President
1	Myrat Karanow	9 January 1992	no information	Saparmurat Niyazov
2	Batyr Hallyýew	no information	15 December 1993	Saparmurat Niyazov
3	Lýudmila Glazowskaýa	15 December 1993	24 February 2000	Saparmurat Niyazov
4	Kakamyrat Ballyýew	24 February 2000	14 September 2001	Saparmurat Niyazov
5	Jeren Taýimowa	14 September 2001	3 August 2009	Saparmurat Niyazov Gurbanguly Berdimuhamedow
6	Bekdurdy Amansarýyew	31 August 2009	11 February 2021	Saparmurat Niyazov Gurbanguly Berdimuhamedow
7	Merdan Gazakbaýew	11 February 2021	Present	Gurbanguly Berdimuhamedow Serdar Berdimuhamedow
