= Jamiat Eslah =

- جمعيت اصلاح افغانستان
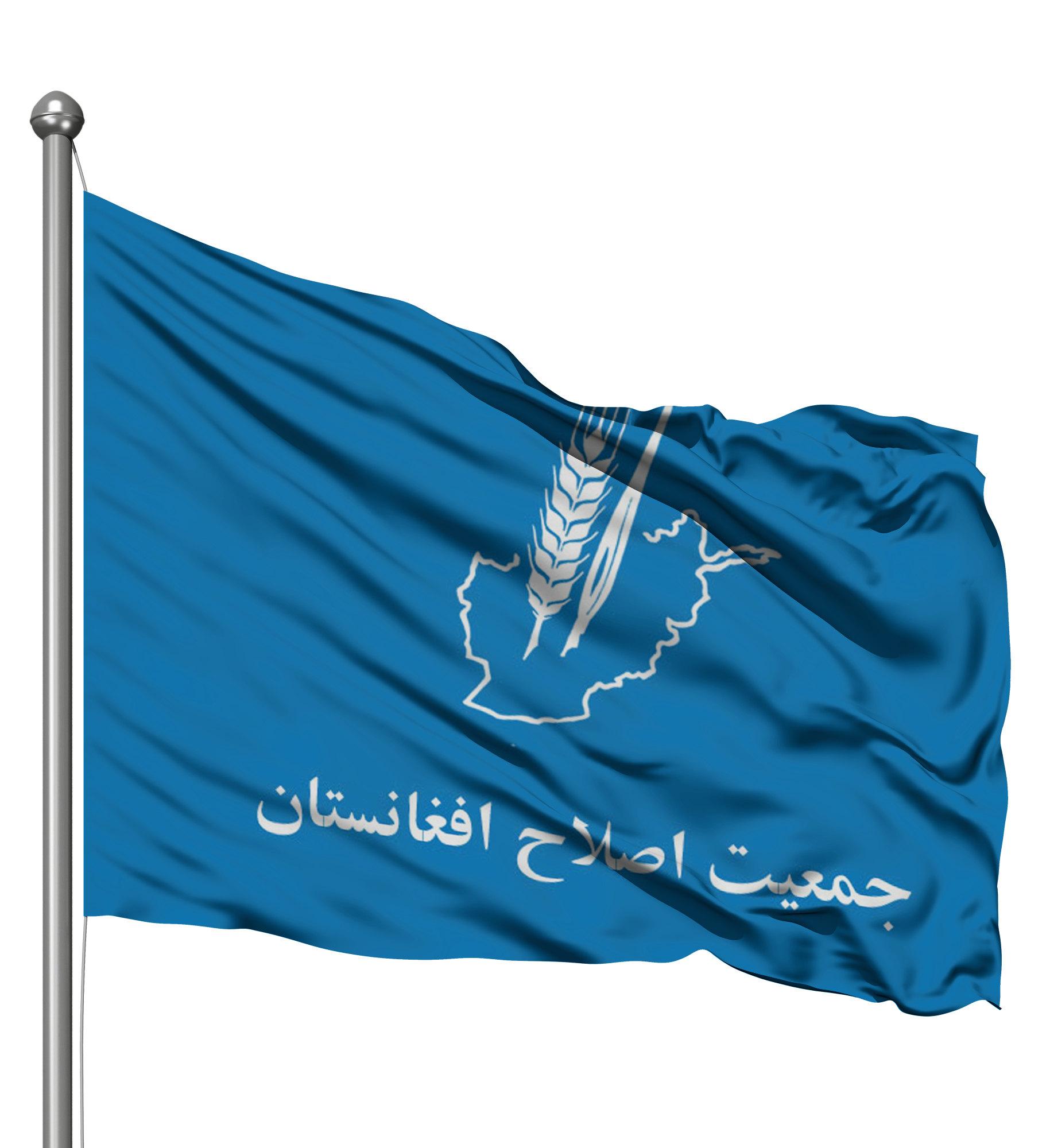
- Founded: 2004 (Kabul)
- Type: Non-profit organization
- Region served: Afghanistan
- Website: Eslah.Af

{{

Jamiat Eslah (Pashto: د افغانستان ټولنيز اصلاح او پرمختګ ټولنه,"Afghan Society for Social Reforms & Development") (Persian: جمعیت اصلاح افغانستان) is an Islamist nonprofit organization based in Afghanistan. Established in 2004, it operates in Kabul and other important cities of Afghanistan, and is financed by a number of Afghan intellectuals, teachers and businessman.

In the recent bombings of Afghanistan, one of the prominent associates of this organization was killed, Mohammad Atef.
