= Ministry of Communications (Turkmenistan) =

Government ministry of Turkmenistan

Ministry of Communications of Turkmenistan
- Türkmenistanyň Aragatnaşyk ministrligi

Agency overview
- Formed: 1991
- Dissolved: 2019
- Jurisdiction: Government of Turkmenistan
- Headquarters: Archabil highway, Ashgabat
- Child agency: Turkmentelecom; Altyn Asyr; Turkmenpochta
- Website: www.mincom.gov.tm

The Ministry of Communications (Turkmen: Türkmenistanyň Aragatnaşyk ministrligi) is a governmental agency in Turkmenistan responsible for telecommunications, post, internet, television, and radio. The ministry was founded in 1991 and was abolished in connection with the creation of the Ministry of Industry and Communication of Turkmenistan on 29 January 2019. It was reconstituted on 11 July 2025 by presidential decree.

== Ministry building ==
On 1 April 2011, a new building of the Ministry was commissioned in Ashgabat. The building houses the offices of Turkmentelecom and Turkmenpochta. The building was erected along Archabil Avenue in Ashgabat.

== Structure ==
The minister has three deputies. The following enterprises operate under the Ministry of Communications of Turkmenistan:

- Turkmentelecom
- Altyn Asyr
- Teleradiomerkezy
- Turkmenpochta
- Ashgabat City Telephone Network
- State Inspectorate for the Supervision of Radio Frequency Use
- Center for International Settlements and Contracts.
- Vocational School #5

== List of heads ==
No	Name	Start	End
1	Shahargeldy Muradov	1991	26 June 1992
2	Amanmurad Jummyev	26 June 1992	15 August 1996
3	Ashirberdy Cherkezov	15 August 1996	7 July 1997
4	Rovshan Kerkavov	15 December 1997	9 July 2001
5	Rasulberdy Khodjakurbanov	23 November 2001	15 January 2009
6	Ovlyaguly Dzhumaguliyev	15 January 2009	17 February 2012
7	Bayramgeldi Ovezov	22 February 2012	29 January 2019
7	Hajymyrat Hudaýgulyýew	11 July 2025	incumbent

== See also ==
- Telecommunications in Turkmenistan
