= MTS Turkmenistan =

Turkmen mobile phone operator

- Native name: "MTS Turkmenistan" Economic Society
- Industry: Mobile Telecommunications
- Founded: 1994
- Headquarters: Ashgabat, Turkmenistan
- Key people: Oleg Atamanov - President; Berdyeva Ejebay – CFO
- Products: GSM, EDGE, GPRS, 3G
- Parent: MTS
- Website: http://www.mts.tm/

MTS Turkmenistan (Turkmen: MTS Türkmenistan) was a mobile phone operator in Turkmenistan. It was fully owned by Russia's MTS. As of 2013, it had 1.89 million subscribers. Its rival Altyn Asyr had 3.5 million subscribers. It was officially closed sometime in late 2017, leaving Altyn Asyr the only major mobile network operator in the country.

== Company background ==
On July 25, 2012, the company signed an agreement with the TurkmenTelecom enterprise of Ministry of Communications of Turkmenistan which says that MTS Turkmenistan will on a monthly basis pay to TurkmenTelecom 30% of its net profit derived from operations in Turkmenistan. This agreement was for five years and may be extended another five years subject to some conditions. The company had also been granted GSM and 3G licenses for a three-year term.

== Number of Subscribers ==
| Date | Subscribers |
|---|---|
| March 2006 | 90,000 |
| December 2007 | 360,000 |
| December 2008 | 930,000 |
| December 2009 | 1,760,000 |
| December 2010 | 2,420,000 |
| September 2012 | 850,000 |
| December 2012 | 1,440,000 |
| March 2013 | 1,890,000 |
