= Turkmenpochta =

Turkmen national postal operator

Turkmenpost Postal Service Company
- Native name: «Türkmenpoçta» poçta aragatnaşyk kompaniýasy
- Company type: Government Company
- Industry: Postal services, courier
- Founded: 1 April 1993; 33 years ago
- Headquarters: Mäti Kösäýewa street 16, Ashgabat, Turkmenistan
- Area served: Turkmenistan
- Key people: Shokhrat Khojaniyazov (CEO)
- Services: Letter post, parcel service, EMS, delivery, freight forwarding
- Owner: Government of Turkmenistan (100%)
- Number of employees: 2000
- Parent: Ministry of Communications
- Website: post.tm

Turkmenpost (Turkmen: Türkmenpoçta, Turkmenpochta) is the national postal operator of Turkmenistan. The company is responsible for the delivery of mail and issuing postage stamps. It has been a member of the Universal Postal Union since January 26, 1993. Turkmenpost employs about 2,000 people and has over 146 post offices, with its headquarters in Ashgabat.

== History ==
Mail service has existed in Turkmenistan since the time of the Russian Empire. However, since October 1991, the country organizes its own postal service functions.

In any branch of Turkmenpochta, customers can send letters, parcels, money transfers in Turkmenistan, large-sized parcels, EMS-shipments and express transfers.

Turkmenpost provides services in five velayats, all cities and urban-type settlements of Turkmenistan.

The total number of branches of Turkmenpochta is 146. They are equipped with modern communication technology, where payments for services are accepted by non-cash method, bank cards and cash.

DHL Express is among the partners of Turkmenpost.

Since February 2025, Turkmenpost has implemented real-time parcel tracking through integration with the International Postal System (IPS) on the Universal Postal Union platform.

== Building ==
In Ashgabat on April 1, 2011 a Turkmenpost office, and nearby, the building of the Ministry of Communications (Turkmenistan) was constructed.

== Services ==
The postal company Turkmenpost provides the following services:

- Receiving postal money orders
- Payment for postal money orders
- Receiving emails with a declared value
- Receiving sent parcels
- Receiving subscriptions
- Wire transfer
- Wholesale and retail trade (stationery and household goods)
- Receiving subscription fees and international calls
- Receiving utilities
- Other services (packaging of parcels, small packages, parcels, sewing and sale of commercial forms.)
- Delivery service, Courier call from door to door
- EMS services
- Checking traffic fines online, through the website
- Subscribing to newspapers and magazines. Possibility of online subscription through the Abuna and Turkmenmetmugat applications;
- Express Mail service for faster parcel delivery within Turkmenistan.

== See also ==
- Postage stamps and postal history of Turkmenistan
