= Turkmenistan (TV channel) =

Turkmenian television channel

- Country: Turkmenistan
- Broadcast area: Worldwide
- Headquarters: Ashgabat, Turkmenistan

Programming
- Languages: English; Chinese; French; German; Arabic; Russian; Persian
- Picture format: HDTV

Ownership
- Owner: Turkmenistan Government
- Sister channels: Altyn Asyr

History
- Launched: 1 November 2004
- Former names: TV-4

Turkmenistan, formally known as, TV4 Turkmenistan, (Turkmen: Türkmenistan) is a state-owned Turkmenian television channel founded in 2004 aimed at an international audience. The channel was announced in February and started broadcasting on 12 September the same year.

As with other channels of Turkmenistan, it is under the control of the Coordinating Council for Television and Radio Broadcasting of the Cabinet of Ministers of Turkmenistan.

The channel was created in order to avail the international community with the achievements of Turkmenistan in the country's historical transformations in all spheres of public life, as well as to further improve the country's information systems. Altyn Asyr has positioned itself as the main TV channel of Turkmenistan. The channel broadcasts in seven audio tracks (Turkmen, Russian, English, French, Chinese, Arabic and Persian). The headquarters is located in Ashgabat.

The channel broadcasts eleven segments in an hourly cycle: policy, economy, agriculture, science, culture, health, history, tourism, sports, weather and no comment.

== See also ==
- Mass media in Turkmenistan
