= Aşgabat (TV channel) =

State-owned Turkmen television channel

- Country: Turkmenistan
- Headquarters: Ashgabat, Turkmenistan

Programming
- Language: Turkmen

Ownership
- Owner: Government of Turkmenistan

History
- Launched: October 1, 2011; 14 years ago

Aşgabat is a Turkmen state-run channel that specializes in the national capital.

The channel broadcasts for sixteen hours on average (7:00 to 23:00). Fixed programming is limited to nine daily Habarlar bulletins (7:00, 9:00, 11:00, 13:00, 15:00, 17:00, 19:00, 21:00, 22:30) and Ýol hereketiniň howpsuzlygy — ömrümiziň rahatlygy (Road Safety is the Comfort of Our Life), a prevention program. The rest of the schedule consists of blocks of specialized programming, mostly social and political. The channel shares much of its output with Altyn Asyr.

== History ==
In early February 2011, President of Turkmenistan Gurbanguly Berdimuhamedow announced the creation of the Aşgabat channel with the signing of a descree for its creation. On 1 October 2011, the channel started broadcasting as the sixth television channel to open in Turkmenistan.

In September 2012, the channel's director, Orazdurdy Hojanazarow, was reprimanded for "unsatisfactory development of official functions and deficiencies at work".
