= Sport (Turkmen TV channel) =

Turkmen sport TV channel

- Country: Turkmenistan
- Headquarters: Ashgabat, Turkmenistan

Programming
- Picture format: HDTV

History
- Launched: 1 January 2012

Turkmenistan Sport (Turkmen: Türkmenistan Sport) is a Turkmen sport TV channel of State Committee of Turkmenistan on TV, Radio and Film. It first aired on January 1, 2012 under the title "Sport". It broadcasts in the Turkmen language. The channel broadcasts football, hockey, basketball, figure skating, boxing, swimming, volleyball, and other sports.

== History ==
In early December 2011 at a government meeting, Turkmen President Gurbanguly Berdimuhamedov signed a decree "for the widespread adoption of the country's principles of a healthy lifestyle, multiplying the thrust of youth to the sport with the conclusion of Turkmen sport at the international level". This involved the creation of Turkmenistan channel Sport.

The station is designed to promote the principles of a healthy way of life and to promote the development of mass sports movement and sport. The station does not air advertising.

The channel broadcasts championships within Turkmenistan with professional journalists and commentators. In the summer of 2012 it broadcast all of the matches of EURO 2012 and the 2012 Olympic Games. This included daily, live broadcasts in the Turkmen language.

The president is less frequently mentioned, compared to other channels. Rasyl Babayev became the channel's new director after his predecessor, Yuldashgeldi Khanaliyev was dismissed due to not coping his duties.

In June 2019, the channel renewed its contract with Setanta Sports to continue providing the channel with rebroadcasts of its sporting events, until July 1, 2022.
