= Ashgabat City Telephone Network =

Turkmen telecommunications company

- Native name: Aşgabat şäher telefon ulgamy
- Type: State-owned Closed Joint Stock Company
- Industry: Telecommunications
- Founded: 27 January 1994
- Headquarters: Ashgabat, A. Nyýazow şaýoly 104
- Products: Mobile Telephony, Internet
- Website: https://www.astu.tm/

The Ashgabat City Telephone Network (Turkmen: Aşgabat şäher telefon ulgamy, AŞTU) is the telecommunications company in Turkmenistan which provides local telephone, CDMA and IPTV service to subscribers in the city of Ashgabat. It provides long-distance and international calls, broadband access to the Internet via ADSL, and Wi-Fi services for home, business, educational institutions and foreign enterprises.

== History ==
The company was registered on 27 January 1994.

Based on the decree of the President of Turkmenistan dated 17 April 2015, the Ashgabat City Telephone Network was transformed into a closed joint-stock company, with the participation of the Ministry of Communications of Turkmenistan with a share in the authorized capital of 30% and the State Telecommunications Company Turkmentelecom with a share of 60%.

== Services ==
Ashgabat City Telephone Network presently offers a variety of brands and services including dedicated physical and virtual server leasing, colocation services, cloud services.

=== Cable telephony ===
As of 2023, the number of customers of cable telephone services reached 247,449 subscribers.

=== IPTV ===
As of 2023, the number of customers of IPTV services totals 126,449 subscribers.

=== Internet ===
As of 2023, the number of Internet services customers has reached 96,881 subscribers.

=== CDMA Network ===
The CDMA network in Ashgabat was established and put into operation in 2003. Since 2010, the network equipment has been installed and commissioned in other regions of Turkmenistan. The number of users as of 2023 reaches 55,610 subscribers.
