= Miras (TV channel) =

State-owned television channel in Turkmenistan

- Country: Turkmenistan
- Broadcast area: Turkmenistan R5 channel (93.25 MHz) in Ashgabat
- Headquarters: Ashgabat, Turkmenistan

Programming
- Language: Turkmen
- Picture format: 16:9 HDTV

Ownership
- Owner: State Committee of Turkmenistan on TV, Radio and Film

History
- Launched: 1 January 2001
- Replaced: ORT relays (1998)
- Former names: TMT-3 (1998–2001)

Links
- Website: https://tdh.gov.tm/

Miras (Turkmen: [mɪˈɾɑθ]) ('Inheritance' in Turkmen) is one of the eight state-owned television channels of Turkmenistan. Programming on the network is in the Turkmen language and focuses on Turkmen art and culture.

== Programming ==
The channel broadcasts from 07:00 to 23:45 (on average) and transmits all editions of Watan Habarlary along with Altyn Asyr and Ýaşlyk.

Almost all Miras programs are of its own production. These include news programs related to the cultural life of the country and abroad, discussion programs, and broadcasts from concert and theater venues.

Miras relays two hours (16:00 to 18:00) of pre-recorded programming from Russia's Channel One (still referred to as "ORT" in schedules). Before giving permission to broadcast them, the management of the Miras TV channel, together with curators from the Ministry of National Security, carefully studies the content of the programs broadcast from Moscow. The Field of Wonders is one of the programs carried.

Channel director Annaberdy Silabow was reprehended by the president in 2002 for its programming strategies.

== Broadcasting ==
The channel was uplinked to satellite in 1999, when it was still named TMT3.

== See also ==
- Mass media in Turkmenistan
