= Bejrage Sorx =

- Owner: Central Committee of the Communist Party (Bolsheviks) of Turkmenistan
- Founded: April 22, 1932
- Ceased publication: December 31, 1933
- Political alignment: Communism
- Language: Persian language
- City: Ashkhabad
- Country: Soviet Union

Bejrage Sorx ('Red Banner') was a Persian language newspaper published from Ashkhabad, Soviet Union 1932-1933. It was an organ of the Central Committee of the Communist Party (Bolsheviks) of Turkmenistan. The newspaper was published between April 22, 1932 and December 31, 1933. Twenty issues were published in 1933, 57 issues were published in 1933.
