= Balkan (newspaper) =

Newspaper published in Turkmenistan

Balkan gazeti
- Type: Newspaper (3 times per week)
- Format: Broadsheet
- Owner: Balkan Region Administration (100%)
- Publisher: Turkmen State Printing Service (Türkmen Döwlet Neşirýat Gullugy)
- Editor-in-chief: Geldimyrat Hojamyradow
- Founded: 1931 (first issue)
- Language: Turkmen
- Headquarters: 745100, Balkanabat, 145-nji ýaşaýyş jaý toplumy, 1-nji jaý
- Country: Turkmenistan
- Circulation: 17,940 (as of 2021)
- Website: metbugat.gov.tm/newspaper?id=6887 (in Turkmen)

Balkan is a newspaper published in Balkanabat, Turkmenistan. The newspaper is published three times per week (Tuesday, Thursday and Sunday). Electronic PDF copies of it may be downloaded free of charge. The area of distribution covers the territory of Balkan Region.

Balkan is an official newspaper of the Balkan Region's sdministration. The newspaper publishes the official decrees, statements and documents of regional bodies.

Readership of the newspaper includes: authorities (regional, city, district, rural), employees of government agencies, top managers of regional enterprise, customer officers, pensioners, housewives and students.

It covers politics, economics, culture, the oil and gas and agricultural sectors, society, regional legislative documents, and tenders of the government and private companies. It is among the leading regional socio-political subscription newspapers.
