= Neytralny Turkmenistan =

Newspaper

Нейтральный Туркменистан Neýtralnyý Türkmenistan
- Type: Daily newspaper Newspaper of record
- Format: Broadsheet
- Owner: Cabinet of Ministers of Turkmenistan (100%)
- Publisher: Turkmen State Printing Service (Türkmen Döwlet Neşirýat Gullugy)
- Editor-in-chief: Maýa Alimowa
- Founded: November 1924 (first issue)
- Language: Russian
- Headquarters: House of Free Creativity, Garyşsyzlyk şaýoly 100, Ashgabat
- Country: Turkmenistan
- Circulation: 32,241 (as of 2020)
- Website: metbugat.gov.tm/newspapers?id=11 (in Russian)

The front page of Turkmenskaya Iskra for May 9, 1986.

Neytralny Turkmenistan (Russian: Нейтральный Туркменистан, "Neutral Turkmenistan") is the daily official Russian-language newspaper in Turkmenistan. The daily newspaper serves as the official government gazette of the Cabinet of Ministers of Turkmenistan, publishing government-related affairs such as official decrees and newly promulgated laws of parliament, official statements, presidential addresses, documents of state bodies, short biographies of appointees to and candidates for public office, Presidential decrees, and government announcements. Neytralny Turkmenistan had a circulation of 32,241 as of 2020, making it one of the largest Russian-language newspapers in Turkmenistan.

== History ==
This newspaper was first published on November 7, 1924 under the name Turkmenskaya Iskra (Russian: Туркменская искра, "Turkmen Spark"). Between 1927 and 1929, the daily circulation rose from 7,000 to 10,000 copies.

In 1959, the newspaper was awarded the Order of the Red Banner of Labor. In December 1974, the newspaper received a certificate of honor (Russian: почётная грамота) from the Presidium of the Supreme Soviet of the Turkmen Soviet Socialist Republic. In 1975, its circulation was 60 thousand copies.

In 1995, the newspaper was renamed Neytralny Turkmenistan ("Neutral Turkmenistan"). That same year, Gozel Nuraliyeva became a deputy editor, later rising to the position of editor-in-chief.

== Other languages ==
Since 2012, a weekly digest called Neutral Turkmenistan has been published in English, on 8 pages in A3 format. A Turkmen-language near-duplicate daily newspaper, Türkmenistan, is published simultaneously. Türkmenistan is the first Turkmen-language newspaper published in Turkmenistan, with a first issue published on 29 July 1920.
