= Altyn Asyr (mobile operator) =

Turkmen state owned mobile operator

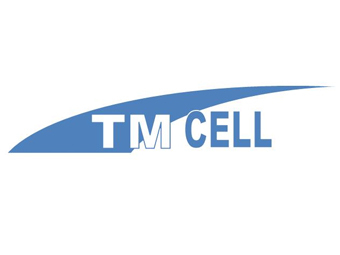
- Trade name: TM CELL
- Type: State-owned closed joint-stock company (CJSC)
- Industry: Mobile telecommunications
- Founded: 2004
- Headquarters: Ashgabat, Turkmenistan
- Key people: Shyhmyrat Shaharliyev
- Products: Mobile telecommunication
- Parent: Turkmentelecom
- Website: tmcell.tm

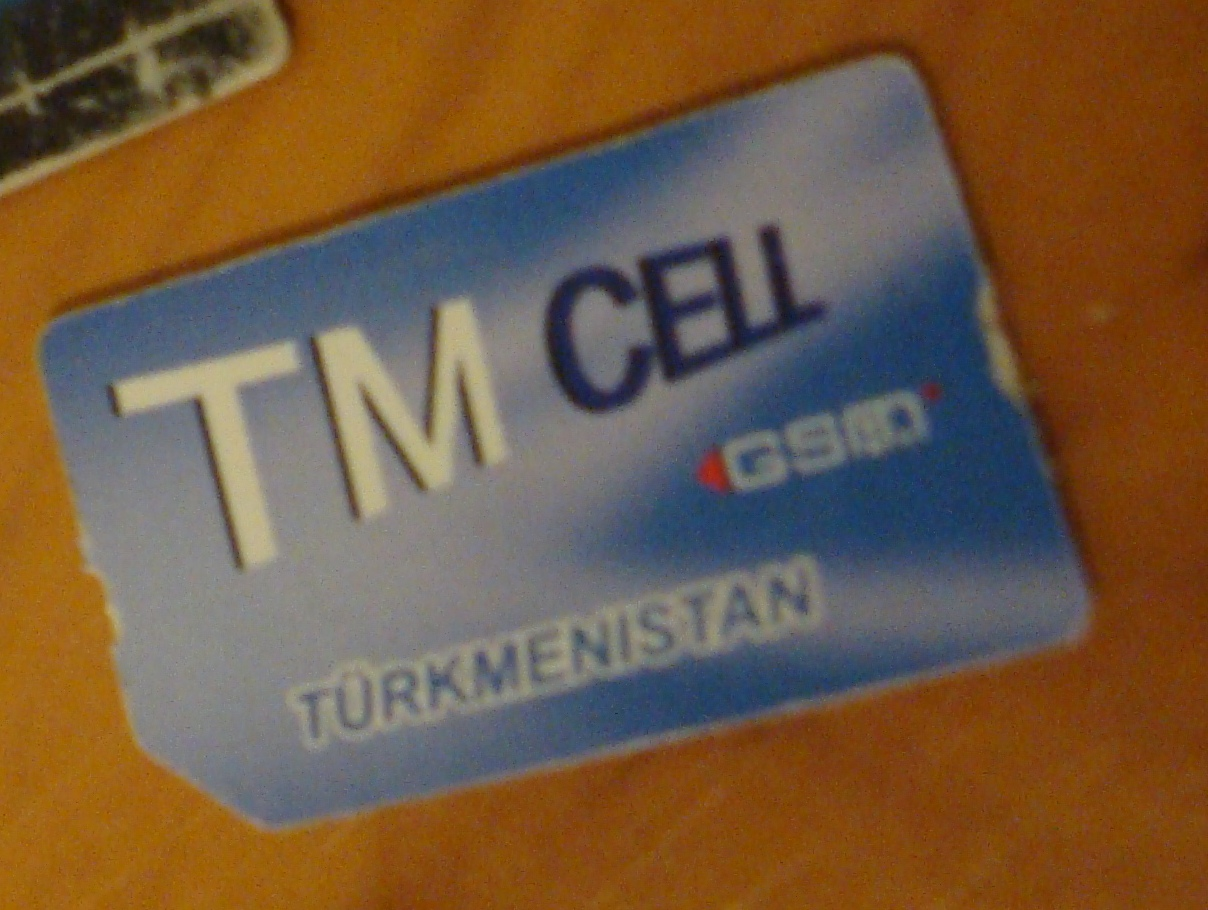
Altyn Asyr SIM-card

Altyn Asyr CJSC (Turkmen: "Altyn Asyr" ýapyk görnüşli paýdarlar jemgyýeti, lit. 'Golden Age') is the state owned mobile operator in Turkmenistan. The company uses the TM CELL brand as its trade name. In September 2017, it had more than 5,5 million subscribers. It is headquartered in Ashgabat.

The company was founded through official decree by Turkmenistan leader Saparmurat Niyazov in 2004.

The company has a monopoly in the mobile market in Turkmenistan. The company is headed by Shyhmyrat Shaharliyev, a member of Turkmen president Serdar Berdimuhamedov's family. The shareholders of the company are not publicly disclosed. Telecommunications are closely monitored and censored in Turkmenistan. Despite considerable investment by Turkmen authoritarian regime into the company, the services provided by the company have been described as poor.

== History ==
The company was established in August 2004. In the same year, the company became a member of the GSMA, where it was registered under the number 438 02. The operator became a structural unit of the Turkmentelecom, which in turn is fully owned by the Ministry of Communications.

The equipment for the initial 50,000 subscribers was supplied by Siemens. Equipment for 25 thousand numbers has been installed in Ashgabat (including Archabil District), Ahal Region (Ak Bugday, Ruhabat, Geoktepe Districts) and Abadan. The rest of the equipment with a total capacity of 25 thousand numbers was installed in the regional centers of Turkmenistan.

In 2010, Altyn Asyr was the first in Turkmenistan to launch a 3G network of the UMTS standard. In April 2010, the number of abonents of Altyn Asyr reached 500 thousand.

A new administrative building was inaugurated in October 2012. The four storey building accommodates 350 staff members.

Since 2012, the company has been providing international roaming services in foreign countries.

On September 18, 2013, the operator launched LTE. At the end of September 2014, the company introduced VoLTE.

In August 2024, the company stopped issuing new SIM cards, citing their absence and the lack of available numbers. Previously, queues to obtain a number stretched out for a year. Using SIM cards from operators from neighboring republics is prohibited in Turkmenistan.

Altyn Asyr's main competitor in Turkmenistan is the Ashgabat City Telephone Network.

== Operations ==
Altyn Asyr in Turkmenistan is a mobile network operator providing services under the standards GSM, 3G and LTE. Apart from cellular network, the company also offers local telephone service, broadband, and mobile television.

=== eSIM ===
In November 2023 Altyn Asyr was the first in Turkmenistan to present an opportunity to switch over to eSIM.

=== Subscriber numbers ===
Altyn Asyr has 6 network codes: 61, 62, 63, 64, 65, 71, 72.

Telephone numbers in the international format are +99361xxxxxx, +99362xxxxxx, +99363xxxxxx, +99364xxxxxx, +99365xxxxxx, +99371xxxxxx and +99372xxxxxx.

Subscribers benefit from core services (voice communications, data transfer, SMS, MMS, voice mail, etc.)

== Number of subscribers ==
Date	Subscribers
April 2005	≈1,500
March 2006	≈20,000
April 2010	≈500,000
June 2012	≈2,600,000
October 2012	≈3,000,000
September 2013	≈3,500,000
September 2017	≈5,500,000

== Sponsorship ==
The operator Altyn Asyr is a shirt sponsor of the football club Altyn Asyr FK since its inception. TM CELL's name is located on the front of the team's shirts.
