= Türkmen Owazy =

Turkmen music TV channel

- Country: Turkmenistan
- Broadcast area: Turkmenistan

Programming
- Language: Turkmen

History
- Launched: 1 January 2009

Links
- Website: BirOwaz - Türkmen milli aýdym-sazlary

Türkmen Owazy ('Turkmen Melody') is a Turkmen music TV channel, broadcasting since 2009 in the Turkmen language. As with other channels of Turkmenistan, it is under the control Coordinating Council for Television and Radio Broadcasting of the Cabinet of Ministers of Turkmenistan. The channel was created to promote Turkmen national musical culture and to acquaint people with the latest developments in this field. It also promotes aesthetic education and harmonious development of Turkmen youth. The channels headquarters are located in Ashgabat.

== History ==
In early December 2008 at a government meeting, Turkmen president Gurbanguly Berdimuhamedov signed a decree "to promote the art of music and culture of the Turkmen people and world public awareness of the successes of the country, to further enhance the impact of information systems", establishing a Turkmen TV channel Turkmen Owazy. In January 2009, the TV channel Turkmen Owazy began to broadcast via Russian satellite Yamal-201.

Both channels broadcast music and entertainment content. Currently, the bulk of the airtime is occupied by music programs. The music format of "Turkmen Owazy" is mainly Turkmen folk and pop music.

Kerwen Aýdogdyýew was appointed director of the channel on 22 December 2020.

== Programming ==
There are no fixed slots for programming on the channel. There is a playlist of programming repeated several times throughout the day.

Unlike other channels, Türkmen Owazy de-emphasizes the president and his activities and concentrates more on viewer participation.
