= Turkmentelecom =

Turkmen National Telecommunications Company

TurkmenTelecom
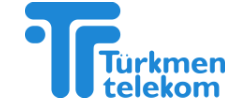
- Native name: TürkmenTelekom
- Company type: Public corporation
- Industry: Telecommunications
- Founded: 7 April 1993
- Headquarters: Archabil pr., 88 h. Ashgabat, Turkmenistan
- Key people: A. Muhammedow (CEO)
- Products: Fixed Telephony; Mobile Telephony; Broadband Internet; IT Services; Networking Solutions
- Website: telecom.tm

TurkmenTelecom (Turkmen: TürkmenTelekom) is a national telecommunications company in Turkmenistan, founded on April 7, 1993. The head office is located in the city of Ashgabat, Archabil pr., 88 h.. It has branches in all regions of Turkmenistan.

TurkmenTelecom covers all the main target markets of Information and communications technology services. The company provides telephony services (including ISDN), data networking, Internet access, and telegraph. TurkmenTelecom is the main telecom operator in Turkmenistan, alongside ACTN, providing all telecommunications services, including Internet, cell phones (through operator TMCELL), and email (collaborating with Sanly). TurkmenTelecom cooperates and collaborates with more than 40 operators in foreign countries, as well as with other communications companies, such as Siemens, Alcatel-Lucent, Ericsson, Netash, Italtel, TCI, and Schlumberger.

== Services ==
=== Corporate email ===
For organizations, the company provides corporate email hosting services.

=== VPS/VDS servers ===
TurkmenTelecom presently offers a variety of brands and services including dedicated physical and virtual server leasing, colocation services, cloud services.

=== IPTV ===
TurkmenTelecom offers IPTV service to individuals and legal entities throughout the country.

=== Wi-Fi ===
The firm providing Wi-Fi hotspot services in cities throughout Turkmenistan including Ashgabat, Anew, Mary, Turkmenabat Dashoguz, Turkmenbashi, Balkanabat.

== TurkmenTelecom applications ==
TurkmenTelecom launched a bundle of multimedia apps on Google Play, App Gallery and App Store. While the apps are available to download for everyone, a user will require a Turkmen SIM card to use some of them. Notable apps include:

- Telekom – Manage TurkmenTelecom account and digital services associated with it
- E-GOV – Government services
- Turkmen Radio – For online Turkmenistan radio streaming
- Menzil – Online and offline map of Turkmenistan
- CERT-GOV - Cyber security government service
