= Altyn Asyr (TV channel) =

State-owned Turkmen television channel

- Country: Turkmenistan
- Broadcast area: Turkmenistan
- Headquarters: Ashgabat, Turkmenistan

Programming
- Language: Turkmen

Ownership
- Owner: Maksat Altayev; Government of Turkmenistan

History
- Launched: 7 November 1959; 66 years ago
- Former names: Turkmen Television (1959–1991); TMT (1991–1997); TMT-1 (1997–2000)

Altyn Asyr, meaning "Golden Age" in Turkmen, is one of the eight television channels owned by the Government of Turkmenistan. It is mainly focused on broadcasting the news in Turkmenistan.

== History ==
Work for a television studio was already underway in April 1958; the plans envisioned the creation of a two-floor television facility and a 150-meter transmitting tower. Television arrived to Ashgabat, the capital of the Turkmen SSR, in 1959, with a transmitter on VHF channel 1 in the Russian standard. Initially it was an experimental service carrying out feature films, with regular service pending the completion of its television center. Color broadcasting started in 1974.

Altyn Asyr has no longer played Russia's Channel One Russia since 1998.

== Programming ==
The Watan Habarlary newscast airs six times a day (7:00, 9:00, 12:00, 15:00, 21:00 and 23:00). The channel's TV startup is at 7:00, while the closedown is usually at 1:00, averaging 18 hours on air. Other programs include Diýar, which has separate editions covering each of the regions of Turkmenistan as well as programs on agriculture and technology. Feature films are broadcast at 23:30 on weekends, after the late edition of Watan Habarlary. Watan Habarlary frequently repeats stories from the previous night in its morning editions.

The Altyn Asyr's clock ident is the same as all other news channels excluding the Türkmen Owazy and Aşgabat channels.

During sign-off, a cityscape of Ashgabat is shown from night till sign-on in the morning.

== See also ==
- Mass media in Turkmenistan
