= List of airports in Turkmenistan =

This is a list of airports in Turkmenistan, sorted by location.

== Airports ==
Location	ICAO	IATA	Airport name	Coordinates
Ashgabat	UTAA	ASB	Ashgabat International Airport	37°59′13″N 058°21′39″E
Balkanabat	UT1H	BKN	Balkanabat Airport	39°28′53″N 54°21′46″E
Dashoguz	UTAT	TAZ	Dashoguz International Airport	41°45′53″N 59°49′59″E
Kerki	UTAE	KEA	Kerki International Airport	37°49′20″N 065°08′17″E
Mary	UTAM	MYP	Mary International Airport	37°36′24″N 61°54′05″E
Turkmenbashy	UTAK	KRW	Turkmenbashi International Airport	40°03′48″N 053°00′26″E
Turkmenabat	UTAV	CRZ	Turkmenabat International Airport	39°05′00″N 063°36′08″E
Jebel	UTAN	BKN	Balkanabat International	39°40′42″N 054°12′28″E

There was also previously a Soviet Air Force base at Mary-2.

== See also ==
- Transport in Turkmenistan
- List of airports by ICAO code: U#UT - Tajikistan, Turkmenistan, Uzbekistan
- Wikipedia: WikiProject Aviation/Airline destination lists: Asia#Turkmenistan
