= Oglanly =

Oglanly Oglanly şäherçesi
- Town
- Location in Turkmenistan
- Coordinates: 39°50′58″N 54°29′40″E
- Country: Turkmenistan
- Province: Balkan Province
- District: Balkanabat

Population (2022 official census)
  - Town: 2,373
  - Urban: 1,715
  - Rural: 658
- Time zone: UTC+5

Oglanly (Russian Cyrillic: Огланли) is a town subordinate to Balkanabat, Balkan Province, Turkmenistan. The nearest town is Jebel, circa 30 km northwest. Balkanabat is 40 km south, on the other side of Great Balkan mountains. In 2022, Oglanly had a population of 1,715 people.

== Etymology ==
In Turkmen, Oglanly is an adjective formed with the word "Oglan," which means "Son," and the suffix -ly, which indicates the presence of the noun that precedes. Put together, it roughly translates as "With sons."

The name of the town was also given to the mountain standing just next to it.

== History ==
Before November 9, 2022, the town was part of Türkmenbaşy District. By decree of the Assembly of Turkmenistan, it is now subordinate to Balkanabat.

== Dependencies ==
Oglanly as a town has a single dependent village that bears the same name, Oglanly, formerly known as sovkhoz Komsomol.

== See also ==
- List of municipalities in Balkan Province
