= Jbel =

JBEL may refer to:

- A variation on the name Jabal
- Journal of Business, Entrepreneurship and the Law (JBEL), a publication of Pepperdine University School of Law

== See also ==
- Jabal (disambiguation)
