= Kerki International Airport =

International airport in Kerki, Kerki District, Lebap Province, Turkmenistan

Kerki International Airport Kerki halkara howa menzili
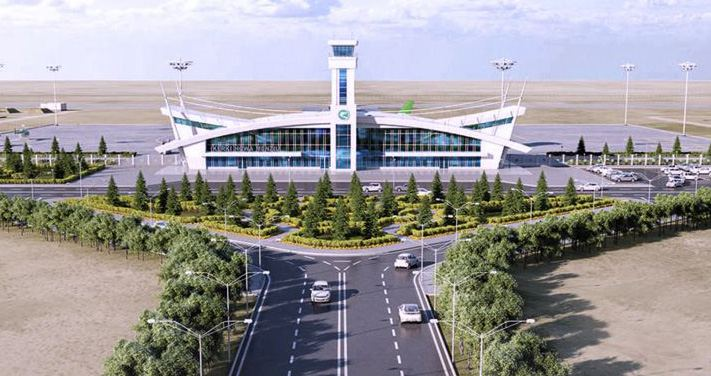
- IATA: KEA; ICAO: UTAE

Summary
- Airport type: Public
- Owner/Operator: Turkmenhowayollary Agency
- Serves: Kerki
- Location: Kerki, Lebap Region, Turkmenistan
- Opened: Ceremony: 23 June 2021; 5 years ago
- Built: 2019—2021
- Time zone: TMT (UTC+05:00)
- Elevation AMSL: 770 ft (230 m)
- Coordinates: 37°49′24″N 065°8′24″E
- Website: www.tia.gov.tm/kerki/

Map
- Location of airport in Turkmenistan

Runways
Direction	Length		Surface
Direction	m	ft	Surface
16/34	2,700	8,858	Asphalt
- Source:World Aero Data

Kerki International Airport (Turkmen: Kerki halkara howa menzili, IATA: KEA, ICAO: UTAE) is an international airport in the city of Kerki, Lebap Province in eastern Turkmenistan. The main purpose of Kerki International Airport is to serve as a second airport in Lebap Region with the main airport being Turkmenabat International Airport.

The airport has a capacity of 100 people per hour and is capable of simultaneously receiving two large aircraft and four helicopters.

== History ==
The order to create an airfield at Kerki was signed in 1946. The first flights began in March 1946. Once a week by Po-2, passengers from Kerki were flown to Ashkhabad and Mary. For many years, planes and helicopters flew from the unpaved strip to Gaurdak, Chardzhou, Garametniyaz, Zähmet and other settlements. In 1974 a reinforced concrete runway was built. It lies at an altitude of 237 metres (770 feet). This original airport was decommissioned when the new airport was completed.

== New airport ==
=== Construction ===
The construction of the new airport of Kerki began in May 2019. Construction entrusted to the Turkmen firm Gündogdy. Construction was completed in May 2021.

=== Functioning ===
The new airport in Kerki was opened on June 23, 2021. The opening ceremony was attended by Turkmenistan President Gurbanguly Berdimuhamedov, members of the government and other politicians. The airport was issued ICAO code UTAE. and IATA code KEA.

== Facilities ==
The area covers an area of more than 200 hectares. The main terminal of the airport has a waiting room with 120 seats, two ticket offices, first aid rooms, international communication points, a left-luggage office, a post office, cafeterias, CIP hall, a mother and child room, and a canteen for 30 seats.

The apron of the airport can accommodate two large aircraft and four helicopters at a time. Its infrastructure also includes an emergency and fire service building, a technical block, a checkpoint, a garage for special vehicles, and other auxiliary facilities. The airport complex also includes parking lots for passengers and airport employees and is served by a bus stop.

== Airlines and destinations ==
Airlines	Destinations
Turkmenistan Airlines	Ashgabat, Balkanabat

== See also ==
- List of airports in Turkmenistan
- Ashgabat International Airport

== Links ==
- Airport technical estimate
- Photos of project
