= Jubal =

Jubal may refer to:

== People ==
- Jubal (Bible), named in the Book of Genesis as the father of musicians
- Jubal (footballer) (born 1993), Brazilian footballer
- Jubal Brown (born c. 1974), Canadian video producer and multi-media artist
- Jubal Early (1816–1894), Confederate general in the American Civil War

=== In fiction ===
- Jubal Harshaw, in the novel Stranger in a Strange Land by Robert A. Heinlein
- Jubal Droad, protagonist of the science fiction novel Maske: Thaery by Jack Vance
- Jubal Early, a character in the Firefly TV series
- Jubal Valentine, a character in the FBI TV series
- Jubal, a slave trader and crime lord in the Thieves' World universe

== Other uses ==
- Jubal, Iran, a village
- Jubal (film), a 1956 American Western film

== See also ==
- Jubal A. Early House, a historic home and archaeological site located near Boones Mill, Franklin County, Virginia
- Jabal (disambiguation)
