= Jabal =

Jabal, Jabel, Jebel or Jibal may refer to:

== People ==
- Jabal (name), a male Arabic given name
- Jabal (Bible), mentioned in the Hebrew Bible

== Places ==
In Arabic, jabal or jebel (spelling variants of the same word) means 'mountain'.

- Dzhebel, a town in Bulgaria
- Jabal Amman, part of Amman, Jordan
- Jabel, a German municipality
- Jabal, Amreli, a village in Gujarat, India
- Jabal Pur, city in Madhya Pradesh, India
- Jabal Rural District, in Iran
- Jebel, Timiș, a commune in Timiș County, Romania
- Jebel, Turkmenistan, a town
- Jebel Airport is international airport in Turkmenistan
- Jibal or al-Jabal, a late 1st-millennium-CE West-Asian realm

== Other uses ==
- Djebel (1937–1958), a racehorse

== See also ==
- Jubal (disambiguation)
- Jabalah (disambiguation)
