= List of shipwrecks in April 1857 =

The list of shipwrecks in April 1857 includes ships sunk, wrecked or otherwise lost during April 1857.

== 1 April ==
List of shipwrecks: 1 April 1857
| Ship | State | Description |
|---|---|---|
| Celt | United Kingdom | The ship ran aground on the Maplin Sand, in the North Sea off the coast of Essex. She was on a voyage from Brăila, Ottoman Empire to London. She had been refloated by 4 April and taken in to Gravesend, Kent. |
| Cygnet | United States | The schooner was driven ashore and wrecked at Chicago, Illinois. Her crew were rescued. |
| David Smart | United States | The brig was driven ashore 5 nautical miles (9.3 km) north of Chicago with the loss of a crew member. Four crew of the steamship Heron (United States) were drowned when their yawl capsized whilst attempting a rescue. |
| Isly | France | The steamship was driven ashore at Caister-on-Sea, Norfolk, United Kingdom. She was on a voyage from Hull, Yorkshire to Nantes, Loire-Inférieure. She was refloated on 4 April and taken in to Great Yarmouth, Norfolk. |
| Sevilliano | Spain | The steamship collided with Bonita (United Kingdom) in the Irish Sea and was abandoned by all but one of her crew, who were rescued by Bonita. Sevilliano was on a voyage from the Clyde to Cádiz. Bonita towed her in to Kingstown, County Dublin, United Kingdom. |
| Temperance | United States | The schooner was wrecked at Racine, Wisconsin. |

== 2 April ==
List of shipwrecks: 2 April 1857
| Ship | State | Description |
|---|---|---|
| Arcola | United States | The 176-gross register ton sidewheel steamboat was cut in two by ice and sank in Lake Pepin on the Mississippi River near Reads Landing, Minnesota, 0.5 mile (0.8 km) above Pepin, Wisconsin. |
| Burlington | United Kingdom | The schooner was wrecked near Gulliver's Hole with the loss of two of her crew. She was on a voyage from Margaretsville, North Carolina to Boston, Massachusetts, United States. |
| Commerce | United Kingdom | The brig was driven ashore and wrecked at Millisle, County Down. |
| Deutschland | Hamburg | The ship sprang a leak and sank in the Atlantic Ocean. Her 55 crew were rescued by Bayonnais (France). Deutschland was on a voyage from Cardiff, Glamorgan, United Kingdom to New York, United States. |
| Frances | United Kingdom | The brig foundered in the Mediterranean Sea 25 nautical miles (46 km) north north east of Gozo, Malta. Her crew were rescued by the felucca Salvatore ( Kingdom of the Two Sicilies). Frances was on a voyage from Troon, Ayrshire to Beyrout, Ottoman Syria. |
| J. N. Scott | United States | Filibuster War: The paddle steamer suffered a boiler explosion and sank in the San Juan River with loss of 60 lives. |
| Queen of Commerce | United Kingdom | The barque was driven ashore and wrecked near Cape Spartel, Morocco. Her crew survived. She was on a voyage from Sunderland, County Durham to Alexandria, Egypt. |
| Sarah Pringle | United Kingdom | The ship ran aground on the East Mouse, Anglesey. She was on a voyage from Barrow-in-Furness, Lancashire to Bristol, Gloucestershire. She was refloated on 15 April and towed in to Amlwch, Anglesey in a severely damaged condition. |
| Temiscouata | United Kingdom | The brig was driven ashore at Sunderland. She was on a voyage from King's Lynn, Norfolk to Hartlepool, County Durham. She was refloated on 10 April and towed in to Sunderland. |

== 3 April ==
List of shipwrecks: 3 April 1857
| Ship | State | Description |
|---|---|---|
| Brothers | United Kingdom | The sloop was run into by Thomas and Ann (United Kingdom) and sank off Puffin Island, Anglesey. Her crew were rescued. |
| Fawcett | United Kingdom | The barque ran aground in the River Mersey. She was refloated and taken in to Liverpool, Lancashire. |
| Sultana | United Kingdom | The ship ran aground on the Western Vargoyer Sand, off the French coast. She was on a voyage from South Shields, County Durham to Aden. She was refloated and taken in to Deal, Kent in a leaky condition. |

== 4 April ==
List of shipwrecks: 4 April 1857
| Ship | State | Description |
|---|---|---|
| Brenda | United Kingdom | The steamship was driven ashore near Smyrna, Ottoman Empire. She had been refloated by 8 April and sailed for Malta and London. |
| Gateshead Park | United Kingdom | The barque ran aground on the Longsand, in the North Sea off the coast of Essex and was wrecked. Her crew were rescued. She was on a voyage from Newcastle upon Tyne, Northumberland to Venice, Kingdom of Lombardy–Venetia. |
| Jane S. | United Kingdom | The ship was driven ashore and wrecked at Abraham Wyke, north of Cloughton, Yorkshire. Her crew were rescued. She was on a voyage from Havre de Grâce, Seine-Inférieure, France to Newcastle upon Tyne, Northumberland. |
| Kate | United Kingdom | The ship caught fire and was scuttled off Jubal, Persia. She was on a voyage from South Shields, County Durham to Suez, Egypt. |
| Una | United Kingdom | The ship ran aground on the Scroby Sands, Norfolk. She was on a voyage from Sunderland, County Durham to Rotterdam, South Holland, Netherlands. She was refloated and taken in to Great Yarmouth in a leaky condition. |

== 5 April ==
List of shipwrecks: 5 April 1857
| Ship | State | Description |
|---|---|---|
| Andrews | United Kingdom | The brig ran aground on the Sheringham Shoal, in the North Sea off the coast of Norfolk and sank. Her crew were rescued. |
| Ellen Oliver | United Kingdom | The barque ran aground on The Skerries, Anglesey. Her crew were rescued by the Cemlyn Lifeboat. She was on a voyage from New Orleans, Louisiana, United States to Liverpool, Lancashire. She was refloated with assistance from the steamship Montague (United Kingdom) and taken in to Holyhead, Anglesey in a waterlogged condition. |
| Jassel Park | United Kingdom | The barque ran aground on the Shipwash Sand, in the North Sea off the coast of Suffolk. |
| King of the Forest | United Kingdom | The schooner was severely damaged by fire at Newport, Monmouthshire. |
| Shelah | United Kingdom | The schooner was driven ashore and severely damaged at Catcraig, near Dunbar, Lothian. Her six crew survived. She was on a voyage from Rotterdam, South Holland, Netherlands to Grangemouth, Stirlingshire. |
| Trident | Belgium | The barque sprang a leak and put in to Manila, Spanish East Indies. She was consequently condemned and broken up. |

== 6 April ==
List of shipwrecks: 6 April 1857
| Ship | State | Description |
|---|---|---|
| Isabella | United Kingdom | The schooner was driven ashore and wrecked at Sunderland, County Durham. Her crew were rescued. She was on a voyage from St Osyth, Essex to Sunderland. She was refloated on 10 April. |
| Shilow | United Kingdom | The ship was driven ashore and wrecked at Dunbar, Lothian. She was on a voyage from Rotterdam, South Holland, Netherlands to Grangemouth, Stirlingshire. |
| Sulina | United Kingdom | The ship was driven ashore and wrecked at Brow Head, County Cork. Her crew were rescued. She was on a voyage from Liverpool, Lancashire to New York, United States. |

== 7 April ==
List of shipwrecks: 7 April 1857
| Ship | State | Description |
|---|---|---|
| Catherine | United Kingdom | The schooner was driven ashore near Blyth, Northumberland. Her six crew were rescued by the Newbiggin Lifeboat. She was refloated with the assistance of two cobles and taken in to Blyth. |
| John and Isabella | United Kingdom | The ship was driven ashore at Hauxley, Northumberland. She was refloated and towed in to Warkworth, Northumberland. |

== 8 April ==
List of shipwrecks: 8 April 1857
| Ship | State | Description |
|---|---|---|
| Harriet | United Kingdom | The ship ran aground in the River Nith. She was on a voyage from Bristol, Gloucestershire to Dumfries. She was refloated and taken in to Dumfries in a leaky condition. |
| Thornley | United Kingdom | The ship was driven ashore at South Foreland, Kent. She was on a voyage from Sunderland, County Durham to Bordeaux, Gironde, France. |

== 9 April ==
List of shipwrecks: 9 April 1857
| Ship | State | Description |
|---|---|---|
| Armenian | United Kingdom | The steamship ran ashore on being launched at Hartlepool, County Durham and was damaged. Subsequently repaired. |
| Earl of Clancarty | United Kingdom | The ship ran aground on the Newcombe Sand, in the North Sea off the coast of Suffolk. She was on a voyage from South Shields, County Durham to London. She was refloated and taken in to Lowestoft, Suffolk in a leaky condition. |
| Sultan | Malta | The brig was driven ashore and wrecked at Jaffa, Ottoman Syria. Her crew were rescued. |

== 10 April ==
List of shipwrecks: 10 April 1857
| Ship | State | Description |
|---|---|---|
| Boanerges | United Kingdom | The ship ran aground at Plymouth, Devon. She was on a voyage from Liverpool, Lancashire to Sydney, New South Wales. She was refloated the next day. |

== 11 April ==
List of shipwrecks: 11 April 1857
| Ship | State | Description |
|---|---|---|
| David Williams | United Kingdom | The Mersey Flat was wrecked on the West Hoyle, in Liverpool Bay. Her crew were rescued by a lifeboat. |
| Panther | United Kingdom | The ship was driven ashore at Nahant, Massachusetts, United States. She was on a voyage from Calcutta, India to Boston, Massachusetts. |
| Rapid | United Kingdom | The steamship was driven ashore at Kirkcaldy, Fife. She was refloated and towed in to Granton, Lothian. |
| Ugie | United Kingdom | The collier ran aground on the Schulhoek Bank, in the North Sea off the coast of Zeeland, Netherlands. She was on a voyage from Newcastle upon Tyne, Northumberland to Rotterdam, South Holland, Netherlands. She was refloated and taken in to Rotterdam, where she arrived the next day. |
| Winterfield | United Kingdom | The ship was driven ashore and wrecked at St Andrews, Fife. |

== 12 April ==
List of shipwrecks: 12 April 1857
| Ship | State | Description |
|---|---|---|
| Joseph Sanderson | United Kingdom | The ship was sighted off the Sand Heads whilst on a voyage from Calcutta, India to London. No further trace, presumed foundered with the loss of all hands. |
| Sarah and Elizabeth | United Kingdom | The whaler was sunk by ice in the Davis Strait. Her 49 crew were rescued by the whaler Diana (United Kingdom). |

== 13 April ==
List of shipwrecks: 13 April 1857
| Ship | State | Description |
|---|---|---|
| Ann Mackey | United Kingdom | The ship ran aground at Southwold, Suffolk and was damaged. She was on a voyage from Newcastle upon Tyne, Northumberland to Southwold. She was refloated on 15 April and taken into the harbour. |
| Jane and Mary | United Kingdom | The brig was wrecked on the Cabadello Sand, off Porto, Portugal. Her crew were rescued. |
| Lilias | United Kingdom | The schooner was driven ashore at "Burquero", near Cape Ortegal, Spain. Her crew were rescued. She was on a voyage from Liverpool, Lancashire to Trieste. She was refloated on 8 July and taken in to Ferrol, Spain. |
| Rose | United Kingdom | The Mersey Flat was driven ashore at Hoylake, Lancashire. Her two crew were rescued. She was on a voyage from Chester, Cheshire to Liverpool. |
| Unnamed | United Kingdom | The Mersey Flat ran aground on the West Hoyle, in Liverpool Bay. Her crew were rescued by the Point of Ayre Lifeboat. She was refloated. |
| Unnamed | United Kingdom | The Mersey Flat was driven ashore at Mockbeggar, Cheshire. Her crew were rescued by the Hoylake Lifeboat. |

== 14 April ==
List of shipwrecks: 14 April 1857
| Ship | State | Description |
|---|---|---|
| Arabella | United Kingdom | The ship was struck by lightning and destroyed by fire in the Atlantic Ocean. Her crew were rescued. She was on a voyage from Apalachicola, Florida, United States to Liverpool, Lancashire. |
| Bellona | United Kingdom | The ship was driven ashore at Zuydcoote, Nord, France. Her crew were rescued. She was on a voyage from Newcastle upon Tyne, Northumberland to Martinique. |
| City of Rotterdam | Netherlands | The schooner ran aground and was wrecked near the Nieuw Diep. Her crew were rescued. She was on a voyage from Sunderland, County Durham to the Nieuw Diep. |
| Diligence | United Kingdom | The sloop ran aground on the Noordbank, in the North Sea off the Dutch coast. |
| Furst Borwin III | United Kingdom | The ship was severely damaged by fire at Wick, Caithness. |
| HMS Raleigh | Royal Navy | The Raleigh-class frigate struck the Five Miles Reef and was beached near Macao, China. Her crew were rescued. She was a total loss. |
| Royal Arthur | United Kingdom | The ship was driven ashore at Point Lornel, near Étaples, Pas-de-Calais, France. Her crew were rescued. She was on a voyage from London to the Cape of Good Hope, Cape Colony. She had been refloated by 22 April and taken in to Boulogne, Pas-de-Calais. |

== 15 April ==
List of shipwrecks: 15 April 1857
| Ship | State | Description |
|---|---|---|
| Hero | United Kingdom | The ship ran aground at the mouth of the River Wear. She was on a voyage from Sunderland, County Durham to Bordeaux, Gironde, France. She was refloated on 19 April and put back to Sunderland. |

== 16 April ==
List of shipwrecks: 16 April 1857
| Ship | State | Description |
|---|---|---|
| Eliza Susan | United Kingdom | The brig was driven ashore near Brielle, South Holland, Netherlands. Her crew were rescued. She was on a voyage from Newcastle upon Tyne, Northumberland to Antwerp, Belgium. |
| Hope | United Kingdom | The brig was driven ashore near Brielle. Her crew were rescued. she was on a voyage from ]Newcastle upon Tyne to Dordrecht, South Holland. |
| Volusia | United Kingdom | The brig ran aground on the Holm Sand, in the North Sea off the coast of Suffolk. She was on a voyage from Sunderland, County durham to London. She was refloated and taken in to Lowestoft, Suffolk. |
| Wizard | United Kingdom | The cutter was in collision with a steamship in the River Mersey. She was on a voyage from Liverpool, Lancashire to Africa. She was taken into the Prince's Dock, where she sank. |

== 17 April ==
List of shipwrecks: 17 April 1857
| Ship | State | Description |
|---|---|---|
| Alexander | United Kingdom | The schooner foundered in the North Sea off the mouth of the Eider, Her crew were rescued. She was on a voyage from Hartlepool, County Durham to Hamburg. |
| Conquest | United Kingdom | The ship ran aground on the Blackwater Bank, in the Irish Sea off the coast of County Dublin. She was on a voyage from Liverpool, Lancashire to Quebec City, Province of Canada, British North America. She was refloated and towed back to Liverpool. |
| Diamond | United Kingdom | The ship was driven ashore and wrecked at Kilmore, County Wexford. She was on a voyage from Cardiff, Glamorgan to Waterford. |
| Gezina | Netherlands | The ship was driven ashore at "Maloes", Pembrokeshire, United Kingdom. She was on a voyage from Cardiff to Groningen. |
| Otilla | United Kingdom | The ship was driven ashore at Tranmere, Cheshire. She was on a voyage from Callao, Peru to Liverpool. She was refloated. |
| Oulton | United Kingdom | The schooner was run into by the schooner Daniel (Belgium) and sank at Holyhead, Anglesey with the loss of one life. She was on a voyage from Liverpool to Waterford. She was refloated on 24 April and beached. |
| Panthea | United Kingdom | The ship was run down and sunk in the English Channel off Beachy Head, Sussex by an American vessel. All on board were rescued by the lugger XL (Netherlands). Panthea was on a voyage from South Shields, County Durham to Genoa, Kingdom of Sardinia. |
| Volusia | United Kingdom | The ship ran aground on the Holm Sand, in the North Sea off the coast of Suffolk. She was on a voyage from Sunderland, County Durham to London. She was refloated. |

== 18 April ==
List of shipwrecks: 18 April 1857
| Ship | State | Description |
|---|---|---|
| City of Quebec | United Kingdom | The ship ran aground at Aberdeen. She was on a voyage from Aberdeen to Quebec City, Province of Canada, British North America. |
| Dove | United Kingdom | The ship was driven ashore and wrecked at Aberystwyth, Cardiganshire. |
| Hermann | Bremen | The steamship ran aground in the Weser. She was on a voyage from Bremen to Southampton, Hampshire, United Kingdom and New York, United States. She had been refloated by 21 April and taken in to The Downs. |
| Robust | United Kingdom | The schooner was driven ashore at Aberystwyth. |
| Woodcock | United Kingdom | The ship was run into by Fidelia (United States and sank off the coast of County Louth. Her five crew were rescued by Fidelia. Woodcock was on a voyage from Swansea, Glamorgan to Liverpool, Lancashire. |

== 19 April ==
List of shipwrecks: 19 April 1857
| Ship | State | Description |
|---|---|---|
| John Shelley | United Kingdom | The ship sprang a leak and was beached at Hubberston Pill, Pembrokeshire. She was on a voyage from Swansea, Glamorgan to Dordrecht, South Holland, Netherlands. |
| The Queen | United Kingdom | The paddle steamer struck the Carr Rock and was holed. She put in to Crail, Fife where she was beached. All on board were rescued. She was on a voyage from Aberdeen to Granton, Lothian. The ship broke up on 25 April. |
| Victoria | United Kingdom | The ship ran aground on the Goodwin Sands, Kent. She was on a voyage from Antwerp, Belgium to Bilbao, Spain. She was refloated and put in to Ramsgate, Kent in a leaky condition.{ |

== 20 April ==
List of shipwrecks: 20 April 1857
| Ship | State | Description |
|---|---|---|
| A. C. Goddin | United States | The steamboat sank in the Missouri River at Bonhomme Island above St. Charles, Missouri. |
| Australia | United Kingdom | The ship was run aground on the Capizas Rocks, off Tarifa, Spain. She was on a voyage from Genoa, Kingdom of Sardinia to Valparaíso, Chile. She was refloated and put in to Gibraltar in a leaky condition. |
| Charlotte | United Kingdom | The ship ran aground at Liverpool, Lancashire. She was on a voyage from Liverpool to Montevideo, Uruguay. She was refloated and put back to Liverpool in a leaky condition. |
| Joseph Clark | United States | The full-rigged ship was driven ashore on Skagen, Denmark. She was on a voyage from New Orleans, Louisiana to Kronstadt, Russia. |
| Louis | Netherlands | The barque ran aground on the Galloper Sand. She was on a voyage from South Shields, County Durham to Batavia, Netherlands East Indies. She was refloated and taken in to Ramsgate in a severely leaky condition. |
| Nymph | United Kingdom | The barque struck the Boat Rock, in the South China Sea and foundered. |
| Radnagore | United Kingdom | The ship ran aground on the Codling Bank, in the Irish Sea. She was on a voyage from Liverpool to "the Mutlah". She was refloated and put back to Liverpool. |
| Wave | United Kingdom | The brigantine was wrecked near Fortune Island, Bahamas. Her crew were rescued. She was on a voyage from Kingston, Jamaica to Liverpool. |
| Wilberforce | United Kingdom | The brig ran aground at the mouth of the Douro. She was on a voyage from South Shields to Porto. She was refloated and taken in to Porto. |

== 21 April ==
List of shipwrecks: 21 April 1857
| Ship | State | Description |
|---|---|---|
| Juffer Annette | Netherlands | The galiot sprang a leak and foundered in the English Channel 55 nautical miles (102 km) west by south of Portland Bill, Dorset, United Kingdom. Her crew were rescued. She was on a voyage from King's Lynn, Norfolk, United Kingdom to Bordeaux, Gironde, France. |
| Martin Luther | United Kingdom | The brig ran aground on the Newcombe Sand, in the North Sea off the coast of Suffolk. She was refloated and resumed her voyage. |

== 22 April ==
List of shipwrecks: 22 April 1857
| Ship | State | Description |
|---|---|---|
| Klazina | Netherlands | The barque was driven ashore at the mouth of the Sitang River. |
| Maria | Denmark | The koff was driven ashore on Lindholmsdale, south of Aarhus. Her crew were rescued. She was on a voyage from London, United Kingdom to Aarhus. |
| Mary | United Kingdom | The ship was driven ashore and severely damaged at Newburgh, Fife. She was on a voyage from Alloa, Clackmannanshire to Newburgh. She was refloated on 27 April. |

== 23 April ==
List of shipwrecks: 23 April 1857
| Ship | State | Description |
|---|---|---|
| Ann | United Kingdom | The ship ran aground on the Longsand, in the North Sea off the coast of Essex. She was on a voyage from Newcastle upon Tyne, Northumberland to Calais, France. She was refloated and taken in to Harwich, Essex in a leaky condition. |
| Arab | United Kingdom | The ship capsized at North Shields, County Durham. She was on a voyage from North Shields to Fraserburgh, Aberdeenshire. She was righted. |
| HMRC Curlew | Board of Customs | The cutter collided with the paddle steamer Baron Osy (Belgium and sank off the Mouse Lightship ( Trinity House) with the loss of seven of her eight crew. The survivor was rescued by HMRC Fly ( Board of Customs). |
| Derwent | United Kingdom | The brig was driven ashore at Porto, Portugal. She was refloated. |
| Elizabeth Jane | United Kingdom | The brig was driven ashore at Porto. She was refloated. |
| Gretina | Kingdom of Hanover | The koff was driven ashore on "Achol" or "Ebeloen", Denmark, She was on a voyage from Middlesbrough, Yorkshire, United Kingdom to Faaborg, Denmark. |
| Jeune Dolphine | France | The brig was wrecked on the coast of Iceland. Her crew were rescued. |
| Kronprinds Frederik | Flag unknown | The brig capsized at "Palesto" with the loss of six of her crew. |
| Norton | United Kingdom | The brig was driven ashore and wrecked at Porto. |
| Valeria | United Kingdom | The ship ran aground at Falmouth, Cornwall and was severely damaged. |

== 24 April ==
List of shipwrecks: 24 April 1857
| Ship | State | Description |
|---|---|---|
| Antelope | United Kingdom | The steamship ran aground near Stettin. All on board were rescued. She was on a voyage from Swinemünde, Prussia to Hull, Yorkshire. She was refloated on 25 April and taken in to Swinemünde. |
| Benjamin and Sarah | United Kingdom | The ship ran aground off Caister-on-Sea, Norfolk. She was on a voyage from Sunderland, County Durham to Harwich, Essex. She was refloated and taken in to Great Yarmouth, Norfolk in a leaky condition. |
| Leonard | Sweden | The ship was driven ashore and wrecked near Schönberg, Grand Duchy of Mecklenburg-Schwerin. Her crew were rescued. She was on a voyage from Paterholm to "Codling". |
| Margaretha | Netherlands | The galiot was run into by the brig Rapid (United Kingdom) in the English Channel 20 nautical miles (37 km) off Start Point, Devon, United Kingdom. Her crew survived. |

== 25 April ==
List of shipwrecks: 25 April 1857
| Ship | State | Description |
|---|---|---|
| Eupatoria | United Kingdom | The brig struck the jetty and sank at Marseille, Bouches-du-Rhône, France. She was on a voyage from Marseille to Alexandria, Egypt. She was refloated on 11 July and placed under repair. |
| Express | United Kingdom | The steamship ran aground on the Mussel Scarp, in the North Sea. She was refloated and taken in to Stockton-on-Tees, County Durham, where she arrived on 27 April. |
| Grace Gibb | United Kingdom | The schooner was driven ashore and severely damaged at Sand Head, Wigtownshire. She was on a voyage from Liverpool, Lancashire to Ardrossan, Ayrshire. Grace Gibb had been refloated by 8 May and taken in to Wick, Caithness. |
| Heinrich | Stralsund | The steamship foundered 3 nautical miles (5.6 km) off Rügen. Her crew were rescued. She was on her second voyage, from Stettin to Hull, Yorkshire, United Kingdom. |
| Isabella | United Kingdom | The schooner ran aground on the Herd Sand, in the North Sea off the coast of County Durham. She was on a voyage from South Shields, County Durham to Dundee, Forfarshire. She was refloated with assistance from Euclid (United Kingdom) and taken in to Stockton-on-Tees, County Durham. |
| Jessamine | United Kingdom | The ship caught fire and was scuttled. |
| Robert and Mary | United Kingdom | The ship was wrecked on the Poll Reef, in the Irish Sea with the loss of all hands. |
| Santiago | Peru | The barque was lost in the Paracel Islands. She was on a voyage from Macao, China to Singapore, Straits Settlements. |
| Titania | Prussia | The ship was lost near Cimbritshamn, Sweden. She was on a voyage from Memel to Dundee, Forfarshire, United Kingdom. |

== 26 April ==
List of shipwrecks: 26 April 1857
| Ship | State | Description |
|---|---|---|
| Harriet | United Kingdom | The ship ran aground and sank on the Banc de l'Etat, 2 cables (370m) off Havre de Grâce, Seine-Inférieure, France. Her crew were rescued. She was on a voyage from Middlesbrough, Yorkshire to Rouen, Seine-Inférieure. Harriet was refloated on 9 May and placed under repair. |
| Peveril | (United Kingdom of Great Britain and Ireland) Isle of Man | The ship was holed by her anchor and sank at Portrush, County Antrim. She was refloated on 28 April and placed under repair. |
| St. Julien | France | The ship was driven ashore near Calais. She was on a voyage from Dieppe, Seine-Inférieure to Dunkirk, Nord. |
| St. Patrick | United Kingdom | The ship foundered in the Mediterranean Sea off Mallorca, Spain. Her crew were rescued. She was on a voyage from Elba, Grand Duchy of Tuscany to Newport, Monmouthshire. |
| William and Mary | United Kingdom | The schooner sank off Linney Head, Pembrokeshire with the loss of all hands. |

== 27 April ==
List of shipwrecks: 27 April 1857
| Ship | State | Description |
|---|---|---|
| Barnard Castle | United Kingdom | The ship was driven ashore at Tynemouth, Northumberland. She was on a voyage from Exeter, Devon to Newcastle upon Tyne, Northumberland. She was refloated on 29 April and taken in to "St. Anthony's". |
| Lily | United Kingdom | The ship ran aground off Westkapelle, Belgium. She was on a voyage from Antwerp, Belgium to Havana, Cuba. She was refloated and resumed her voyage, but consequently put in to Portsmouth, Hampshire in a leaky condition. |
| Loftus | United Kingdom | The smack struck the Coal Rock, off Anglesey. She was on a voyage from Newport, Monmouthshire to Liverpool, Lancashire. She put in to Amlwch, Anglesey in a sinking condition. |
| Majestic | United Kingdom | The ship ran aground and was severely damaged at the mouth of the Rio Grande. She was on a voyage from the Rio Grande to Bristol, Gloucestershire. She was refloated and put back to the Rio Grande. She was consequently condemned. |

== 28 April ==
List of shipwrecks: 28 April 1857
| Ship | State | Description |
|---|---|---|
| Andrew Foster | United States | The full-rigged ship was in collision with the full-rigged ship Tuscarora (United States) and sank in the Irish Sea between Bardsey Island, Pembrokeshire and the Tuskar Rock. All 38 people on board took to the boats; they were rescued by the schooner Little Fred (United Kingdom). Andrew Foster was on a voyage from New York to Liverpool, Lancashire, United Kingdom. |
| Phoenix | United Kingdom | The steamship ran aground at "Hantoon", County Wexford. She was on a voyage from "Hantoon" to Bristol, Gloucestershire. |

== 29 April ==
List of shipwrecks: 29 April 1857
| Ship | State | Description |
|---|---|---|
| St. George | United Kingdom | The ship ran aground off the Tuskar Rock. She was on a voyage from Liverpool, Lancashire to Newfoundland, British North America. She was refloated and put in to Waterford in a leaky condition. |
| Surge | United Kingdom | The ship departed from Falmouth, Cornwall for Coquimbo, Chile. No further trace, presumed foundered with the loss of all hands. |
| William and Henry | United Kingdom | The schooner ran aground on the Newcombe Sand, in the North Sea off the coast of Suffolk. She was on a voyage from Sunderland, County Durham to Plymouth, Devon. She was refloated and taken in to Lowestoft, Suffolk. |

== 30 April ==
List of shipwrecks: 30 April 1857
| Ship | State | Description |
|---|---|---|
| Affghan | United Kingdom | The ship sprang a leak in the Atlantic Ocean. She was abandoned and set afire. Her crew were rescued. She was on a voyage from the Clyde to Quebec City, Province of Canada, British North America. |

== Unknown date ==
List of shipwrecks: Unknown date in April 1857
| Ship | State | Description |
|---|---|---|
| Admiral | United Kingdom | The ship ran aground on the Falsterbo Bank, in the Baltic Sea. She was on a voyage from Stralsund to London. |
| Arabia | United Kingdom | The ship ran aground on the Gasper Sand, off Saugor, India. She was on a voyage from Calcutta to China. She was refloated and taken in to Diamond Harbour in a leaky condition. |
| Avon | United Kingdom | The ship was driven ashore at "Jameson's Point", Maine, United States. She was on a voyage from Liverpool, Lancashire to Castine, Maine. She was refloated and taken in to Rockland, Maine in a leaky condition. |
| Banner | United Kingdom | The schooner was wrecked near the mouth of the Kennebec River. She was on a voyage from Maitland, Nova Scotia, British North America to Bath, Maine, United States. |
| Britannia | United Kingdom | The ship was driven ashore in the Rio Grande between 3 and 6 April. She was on a voyage from Bahia, Brazil to Valparaíso, Chile. |
| Charles Tupper | (United Kingdom of Great Britain and Ireland) British North America | The ship was abandoned in the Atlantic Ocean before 3 April. She was towed in to Tralee, County Kerry in a derelict condition on 25 April. |
| Cheerful | United Kingdom | The schooner was wrecked 2 nautical miles (3.7 km) west of Gibraltar. She was on a voyage from Dunkirk, Nord, France to Santander, Spain. |
| Crescent | United Kingdom | The ship foundered in the North Sea between 17 and 28 April. Wreckage from the ship washed up on Rottumeroog, Groningen and Terschelling, Friesland, Netherlands. |
| Dream | United Kingdom | The ship was driven ashore near Kedgeree, India. She was on a voyage from Melbourne, Victoria to Calcutta. She was later refloated and resumed her voyage. She subsequently ran aground on the Hog River Sand, but was refloated after eleven days, completing her voyage on 16 May. |
| Duchess of Beaufort | United Kingdom | The ship ran aground on the Goodwin Sands, Kent. She was on a voyage from Hartlepool, County Durham to Torquay, Devon. She was refloated and taken in to Ramsgate, Kent in a leaky condition. |
| Elia E Badger | United Kingdom | The ship ran aground in the Hooghly River. She was on a voyage from Liverpool to Calcutta. She was refloated several days later and taken in to Calcutta, where she arrived on 22 April. |
| Elise | Grand Duchy of Mecklenburg-Schwerin | The schooner was driven ashore. She was on a voyage from Newcastle upon Tyne, Northumberland, United Kingdom to Königsberg Prussia. |
| Ellen S. Parsons | United States | The ship was wrecked off Cape Palos, Spain. Her crew were rescued. She was on a voyage from Boston, Massachusetts to Palermo, Sicily. |
| Emile | France | The ship was wrecked in the Camaret Passage. She was on a voyage from Livorno, Grand Duchy of Tuscany to Rouen, Seine-Inférieure. |
| Eugenie | France | The ship was driven ashore in the Rio Grande between 3 and 6 April. |
| Fennechina | Kingdom of Hanover | The galiot was driven ashore at Spurn Point, Yorkshire, United Kingdom. She was on a voyage from Leith Lothian, United Kingdom to a Dutch port. She was refloated and taken in to Grimsby, Lincolnshire, United Kingdom. |
| Furst Louis Wittgenstein | Flag unknown | The ship was driven ashore at "Aponome". She had been refloated and taken in to Salonica, Greece by 11 April. |
| Gefion | Sweden | The brig was driven ashore in the Rio Grande between 3 and 6 April. |
| Glance | United Kingdom | The ship foundered off the mouth of the Rio Grande between 3 and 6 April. Her crew were rescued. She was on a voyage from the Rio Grande to Liverpool. |
| Labour's Increase | United Kingdom | The ship was driven ashore and severely damaged at "Ulwine", Yorkshire. She was refloated on 4 June. |
| Main | Hamburg | The ship ran aground on the Shipwash Sand, in the North Sea off the coast of Suffolk, United Kingdom. She was on a voyage from Hamburg to New York, United States. She was refloated and resumed her voyage. |
| Marionople | United Kingdom | The ship was driven ashore near Cape Helles, Ottoman Empire before 6 April and was abandoned. |
| Maude | United Kingdom | The ship was driven ashore near Berbice, British Guiana. She was on a voyage from Calcutta, India to Demerara, British Guiana. |
| May | United Kingdom | The barque foundered in the Grand Banks of Newfoundland before 14 April. Her crew were rescued by Claude St. Milo (France She was on a voyage from Ardrossan, Ayrshire to Providence, Rhode Island, United States. |
| Melina | United Kingdom | The schooner ran aground at Figueira da Foz, Portugal. She was on a voyage from Figueira da Foz to Liverpool. She was refloated and taken in to Figueira da Foz. |
| Mexicana | United Kingdom | The ship was driven ashore and wrecked near Veracruz, Mexico. Her crew survived. She was on a voyage from Liverpool to Veracruz. |
| Micmac | United Kingdom | The schooner run into the paddle steamer Lynx (United Kingdom) and sank in the Belfast Lough. Her crew were rescued by Lynx. Micmac was on a voyage from Troon, Ayrshire to Belfast, County Antrim. |
| New Hampshire | United States | The ship was driven ashore on Long Island, New York before 9 April and became hogged. She was on a voyage from Glasgow, Renfrewshire, United Kingdom to New York City. |
| Ocean | United Kingdom | The brig was driven ashore 30 nautical miles (56 km) northeast of "Pooree", India before 29 April. She was on a voyage from Liverpool to Calcutta. |
| Ontelina | United Kingdom | The ship was lost in the White Sea near Cape Sweetnose, Russia. Her crew were rescued. |
| Plantagenet | United Kingdom | The ship was driven ashore at York, Maine, United States. She was on a voyage from Cardiff, Glamorgan to Portland, Maine. She had been refloated by 29 April. |
| Pudsey Dawson | United Kingdom | The ship ran aground on the Fairlee Rocks before 8 April. She was on a voyage from Hong Kong to Grucher Bay. She had been refloated by 13 July and resumed her voyage. |
| Royal Stewart | United Kingdom | The ship ran aground in the Hooghly River. She was on a voyage from Calcutta to a French port. She was refloated and put back to Calcutta in a leaky condition. |
| Sarah Burkitt | United Kingdom | The brig was wrecked at the mouth of the Courantyne River. Her crew survived. She was on a voyage from Cayenne, French Guiana to Demerara, British Guiana. |
| Snelheid | Netherlands | The barque was wrecked on the Cobblers Reef with the loss of seven of the twelve people on board. She was on a voyage from Paramaribo, Suriname to Amsterdam, North Holland. |
| Struggler | United Kingdom | The ship was lost near Cape Sweetnose. Her crew were rescued. |
| Tweed | United Kingdom | The brig ran aground on the Steelsand, in the North Sea and was wrecked. Her crew survived. She was on a voyage from Newcastle upon Tyne to Altona. |
| William Milne | United Kingdom | The brigantine was run down and sunk off Málaga, Spain before 3 April by the barque Marion (United States). Her crew were rescued by Marion. |
| William Parker | United Kingdom | The ship ran aground in the "Mutlah" before 8 April. She was on a voyage from Liverpool to Calcutta. She was refloated and taken in to Calcutta in a leaky condition. |
