= Mammetmyrat Geldinyyazov =

Turkmen politician

Mammetmyrat Geldinyyazov (Turkmen: Mämmetmyrat Geldinyýazow) is a Turkmen politician and educator, currently serving as deputy chairman for science, education, and health of the Turkmenistan government.

Geldinyyazov was born in 1971 in the town of Jebel in Balkan province of Turkmenistan. He was graduated from the Turkmen State University in 1993 as a chemistry teacher. He initially taught chemistry at that university. In 2011 he was promoted to director of the Beki Seytakov Pedagogical School, and in 2014 was elected to the Turkmen parliament, where he served on the committee on science, education, culture, and youth policy.

Geldinyyazov was appointed minister of education in 2018. In 2020 he was transferred to the Cabinet of Ministers to head its department of education and societal affairs.
