= Mount Arlan =

Peak in Turkmenistan

- Location within Turkmenistan

Highest point
- Elevation: 1,880 m (6,170 ft)
- Prominence: 1,748 m (5,735 ft)
- Listing: Ultra
- Coordinates: 39°40′24″N 54°32′36″E

Geography
- Country: Turkmenistan
- Parent range: Balkan Daglary

Mount Arlan (Turkmen: Arlan dagy) is an 1,880-metre (6,168 ft) peak in the western plains of Turkmenistan in Balkan Province. Mount Arlan stands about 2,000 metres above the shore of the below-sea level Caspian Sea. It is the highest summit of the Uly Balkan range.

The town of Balkanabat, the capital of Balkan Province, lies 25 km to the southwest.

== See also ==
- List of ultras of Central Asia
