= Cave of Dzhebel =

Cave and archaeological site in Turkmenistan

- location in Turkmenistan Cave of Dzhebel (West and Central Asia)
- 40°2′1″N 52°58′33″E
- Periods: Mesolithic, Neolithic and early Bronze Age
- Location: Nebit Dag (Balkanabat)
- Region: Turkmenistan

The Cave of Dzhebel is an archaeological site near the Krasnovodsk Gulf of the Caspian Sea in Turkmenistan. First explored by Alexey Okladnikov in 1949 and 1950, the site revealed Mesolithic, Neolithic and early Bronze Age artefacts.

According to Bernard Sergent, the lithic assemblage of the first Kurgan culture in Ukraine (Sredni Stog II), which originated from the Volga and South Urals, recalls that of the Mesolithic-Neolithic sites to the east of the Caspian Sea, Dam Dam Chesme II and the cave of Dzhebel. According to Sergent, the Dzhebel material is related to a Paleolithic material of Northwestern Iran, the Zarzian culture, dated 10,000-8,500 BC, and in the more ancient Kebarian of the Near East.

== See also ==
- Indo-European migrations
