= Oglanly (village) =

Oglanly Oglanly obasy
- Village
- Location in Turkmenistan
- Coordinates: 39°52′30″N 54°24′12″E
- Country: Turkmenistan
- Province: Balkan Province
- District: Balkanabat
- Town: Oglanly

Population (2022 official census)
  - Total: 658
- Time zone: UTC+5

Oglanly, previously known as "sovkhoz Komsomol" (in Russian: "совхоз Комсомол"), is a village in Balkan Province, Turkmenistan. It is subordinate to Oglanly, the town of the same name. In 2022, it had a population of 658 people.

== Etymology ==
In Turkmen, Oglanly is an adjective formed with the word "Oglan," which means "Son," and the suffix -ly, which indicates the presence of the noun that precedes. Put together, it roughly translates as "With sons."

== History ==
Before 9 November 2022, the village was part of Türkmenbaşy District. By decree of the Assembly of Turkmenistan, the village, along with the town of the same name, is now subordinate to Balkanabat.

== See also ==
- List of municipalities in Balkan Province
