= Jabalah =

Jabalah may refer to:

- Jabalah IV ibn al-Harith (died 528), king of the Ghassanids
- Al-Harith ibn Jabalah (died c. 569), king of the Ghassanids
- Jabalah ibn al-Aiham (died c. 645), king of the Ghassanids
- Jabalah, Syrian city Jableh

== See also ==
- Jabal (disambiguation)
