= Jabal (name) =

Jabal is an Arabic surname or male given name, which means "mountain". Alternative spellings include Jabel, Jebal, and Jebel. With regard to persons, the name may refer to:

- Badawi al-Jabal (1905–1981), Syrian poet
- Fathi Al-Jabal (born 1963), Tunisian football manager
- Jabal ibn Jawwal, 7th century Arab poet
- Jabel Robinson (1831–1907), Canadian politician
- Muadh ibn Jabal (607–639), Arab companion of Muhammad

== See also ==
- Jabal (disambiguation)
- Jubal (disambiguation)
