= My Freighter Airlines =

Cargo airline of Uzbekistan

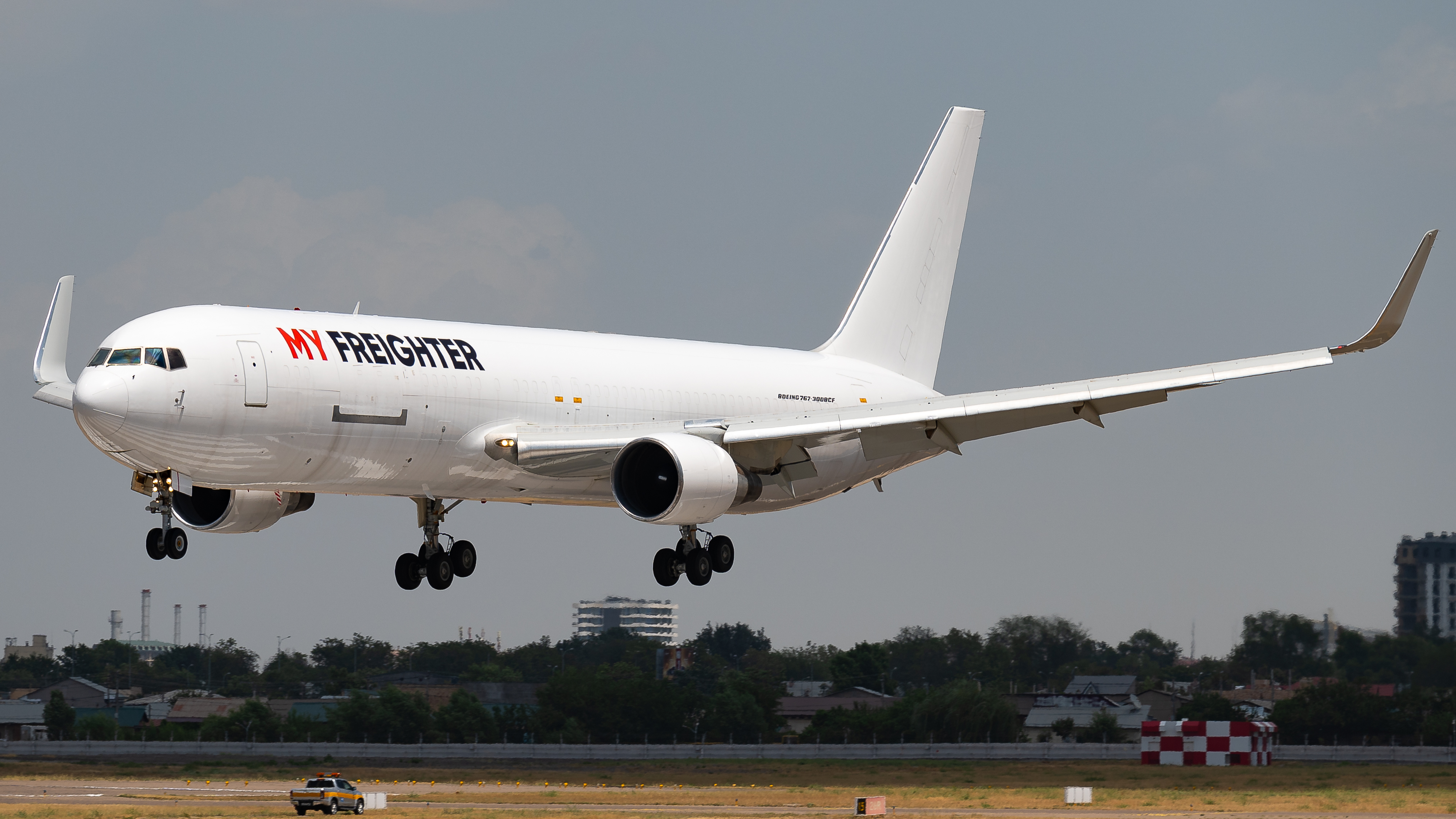
- My Freighter Airlines Boeing 767-300F
IATA	ICAO	Call sign
C6	MFX	WHITEBIRD
- Founded: 2019
- Hubs: Tashkent
- Fleet size: 11
- Parent company: Centrum Holding LLC
- Headquarters: Tashkent, Uzbekistan
- Key people: Abdulaziz Abdurakhmanov, CEO
- Website: MyFreighter.uz

My Freighter Airlines is a cargo airline based in Tashkent, Uzbekistan.

== History ==
My Freighter Airlines is a private cargo airline established in 2019 in Uzbekistan. Airline purchased its first aircraft - Boeing 747-200 on 23 October 2022, being the first Uzbekistan registered Boeing 747 freighter.

In 2025 Acron Aviation signed a multi-year agreement with My Freighter. The contract, provides for the use of state-of-the-art D-Level Full Flight Simulators to enhance pilot qualifications. Training will primarily take place at Acron Aviation's modern training center in Bangkok, with the possibility of expanding the program to the company's London facility. The program ensures that My Freighter pilots receive training according to international safety and operational standards.

In August 2025, My Freighter launched its first scheduled intercontinental route, operating Shanghai (PVG) – Tashkent (TAS) – Amsterdam (AMS) twice weekly with Boeing 767-300F aircraft. The launch was marked by an industry event in Shanghai in partnership with GSA Air Cargo APAC. This was the company's first scheduled cargo service, with plans to scale frequency to daily operations.

On September 3, 2025 CPaT Global, provider of distance learning for the airline and aviation industry, announced a new contract with My Freighter. Under the agreement, CPaT will provide My Freighter with Boeing B767 Freighter Aircraft Systems courses. In addition, airline will have access to CPaT's comprehensive General Subjects library to support their overall training programs.

Airline outlined plans in July 2025 to scale the fleet aggressively toward 30–50 aircraft by end-2026, reflecting My Freighter's ambition to develop a “modern Silk Road” cargo corridor anchored in Central Asia.

In October 2026 Airline announced that it has been designated as an ACC3 (Air Cargo or Mail Carrier operating into the UK from a Third Country Airport) carrier by the UK Department for Transport. The designation confirms that the company’s cargo security procedures meet UK aviation security standards and authorizes it to officially operate cargo flights to the United Kingdom.

== Destinations ==
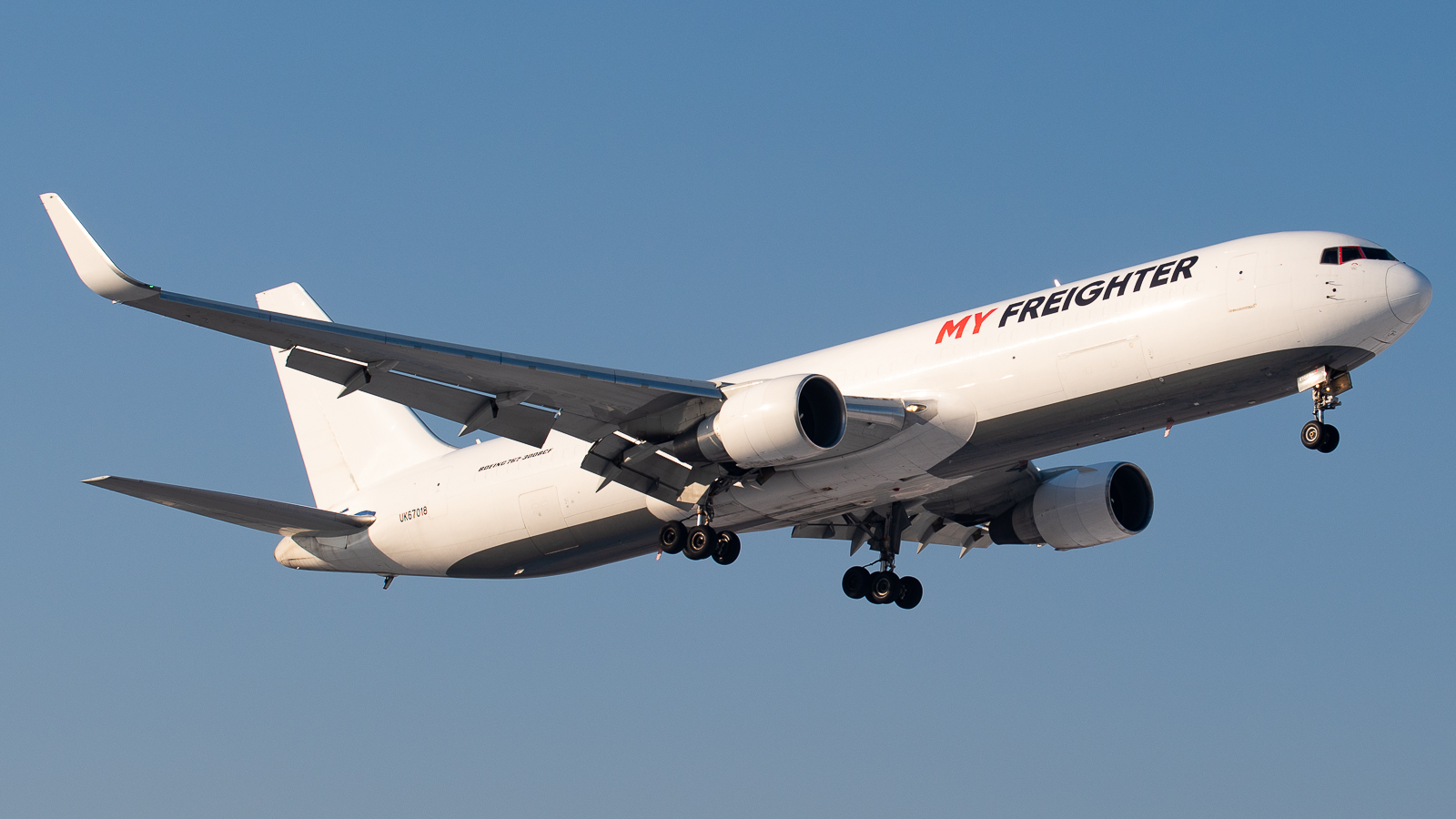
My Freighter Airlines Boeing 767-300F

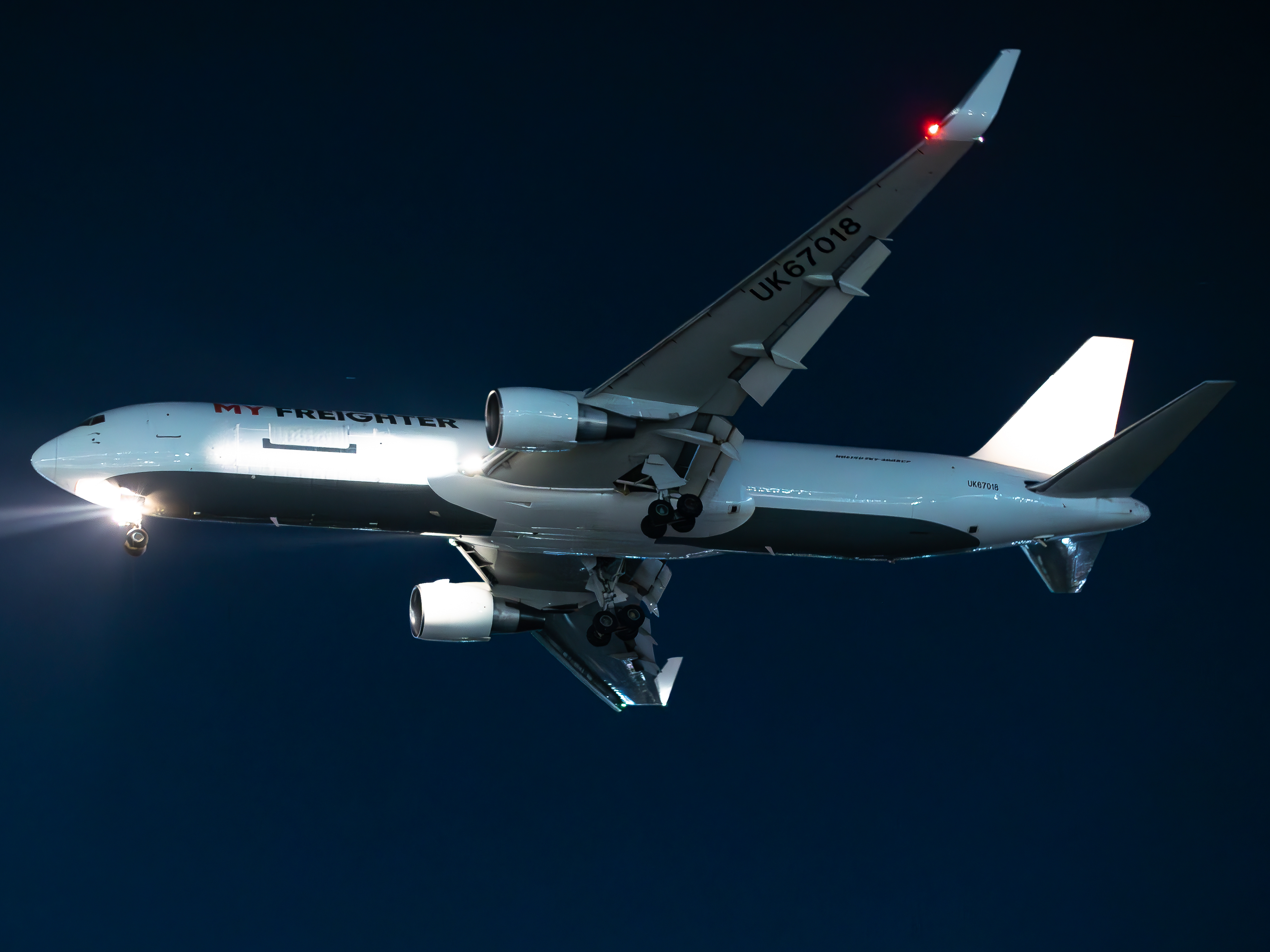
My Freighter Airlines Boeing 767-300F night landing

In February 2024 Airline made its first commercial flight to the international airport in Türkmenabat, Turkmenistan.

In October 2024 My Freighter has made a new route announcement connecting Zhengzhou (CGO) and Liège (LGG).

In May 2025 airline launched direct flights to Jomo Kenyatta International Airport in Nairobi, Kenya.

In August 2025 Maastricht Aachen Airport welcomed the first flight of MY FREIGHTER. This flight marked the beginning of a series of operations in which the Uzbek airline would fly cargo to and from the airport twice a week.

Later in August 2025 My Freighter has launched the first direct air cargo route from Ürümqi Tianshan International Airport in northwest China's Xinjiang to Urgench International Airport in western Uzbekistan.

As of November 2025, My Freighter Airlines serves the following destinations:

Country	City	Airport	Notes	Refs
Afghanistan	Kabul	Kabul International Airport		
Armenia	Yerevan	Zvartnots International Airport		
Austria	Vienna	Vienna International Airport		
Azerbaijan	Baku	Heydar Aliyev International Airport		
Bangladesh	Dhaka	Hazrat Shahjalal International Airport		
Belgium	Liège	Liège Airport		
China	Chengdu	Chengdu Shuangliu International Airport		
China	Enshi City	Enshi Xujiaping International Airport		
China	Guangzhou	Guangzhou Baiyun International Airport		
China	Hangzhou	Hangzhou Xiaoshan International Airport		
China	Hefei	Hefei Xinqiao International Airport		
China	Hong Kong	Hong Kong International Airport		
China	Macau	Macau International Airport		
China	Ordos	Ordos Ejin Horo International Airport		
China	Shanghai	Shanghai Pudong International Airport		
China	Shenzhen	Shenzhen Bao’an International Airport		
China	Shijiazhuang	Shijiazhuang Zhengding International Airport		
China	Tianjin	Tianjin Binhai International Airport		
China	Ürümqi	Ürümqi Tianshan International Airport		
China	Xi'an	Xi'an Xianyang International Airport		
China	Wenzhou	Wenzhou Longwan International Airport		
China	Zhengzhou	Zhengzhou Xinzheng International Airport		
Cyprus	Larnaca	Larnaca International Airport		
Czech Republic	Ostrava	Leoš Janáček Airport Ostrava		
Egypt	Cairo	Cairo International Airport		
Estonia	Tallinn	Tallinn Airport		
France	Châlons-en-Champagne	Châlons Vatry Airport		
France	Paris	Charles de Gaulle Airport		
Georgia	Batumi	Alexander Kartveli Batumi International Airport	Terminated	
Georgia	Tbilisi	Shota Rustaveli Tbilisi International Airport		
Germany	Leipzig	Leipzig/Halle Airport		
Germany	Munich	Munich Airport		
Ghana	Accra	Accra International Airport		
Greece	Athens	Athens International Airport		
Hungary	Budapest	Budapest Ferenc Liszt International Airport		
Hungary	Hévíz	Hévíz–Balaton Airport		
Iceland	Reykjavík	Keflavík International Airport		
India	Delhi	Indira Gandhi International Airport		
India	Mumbai	Chhatrapati Shivaji Maharaj International Airport		
Ireland	Dublin	Dublin Airport		
Israel	Tel Aviv	David Ben Gurion Airport		
Italy	Milan	Milan Malpensa Airport		
Japan	Tokyo	Narita International Airport		
Jordan	Amman	Queen Alia International Airport		
Kazakhstan	Almaty	Almaty International Airport		
Kazakhstan	Astana	Nursultan Nazarbayev International Airport		
Kazakhstan	Atyrau	Atyrau Airport		
Kazakhstan	Qarağandy	Sary-Arka Airport		
Kazakhstan	Şymkent	Şymkent International Airport		
Kenya	Nairobi	Jomo Kenyatta International Airport		
Kuwait	Kuwait City	Kuwait International Airport		
Kyrgyzstan	Bishkek	Manas International Airport		
Lebanon	Beirut	Beirut–Rafic Hariri International Airport	Terminated	
Malaysia	Kuala Lumpur	Kuala Lumpur International Airport		
Mongolia	Ulaanbaatar	Chinggis Khaan International Airport		
Myanmar	Yangon	Yangon International Airport		
Netherlands	Amsterdam	Amsterdam Airport Schiphol		
Netherlands	Maastricht	Maastricht Aachen Airport	Terminated	
Norway	Oslo	Oslo Airport, Gardermoen		
Pakistan	Islamabad	Islamabad International Airport		
Pakistan	Karachi	Jinnah International Airport		
Pakistan	Lahore	Allama Iqbal International Airport		
Poland	Kraków	Kraków John Paul II International Airport		
Poland	Warsaw	Warsaw Chopin Airport		
Romania	Bucharest	Bucharest Henri Coandă International Airport		
Saudi Arabia	Jeddah	King Abdulaziz International Airport		
Saudi Arabia	Riyadh	King Khalid International Airport		
Saudi Arabia	Sharurah	Sharurah Domestic Airport		
Serbia	Belgrade	Belgrade Nikola Tesla Airport		
Serbia	Niš	Niš Constantine the Great Airport		
Singapore	Singapore	Changi International Airport		
South Korea	Seoul	Incheon International Airport		
Spain	Madrid	Madrid–Barajas Airport		
Spain	Zaragoza	Zaragoza Airport		
Sweden	Stockholm	Stockholm Arlanda Airport		
Switzerland	Geneva	Geneva Airport		
Switzerland	Zurich	Zurich Airport		
Tajikistan	Dushanbe	Dushanbe International Airport	Terminated	
Thailand	Bangkok	Suvarnabhumi Airport		
Turkey	Istanbul	Istanbul Airport		
Turkmenistan	Türkmenabat	Türkmenabat International Airport	Terminated	
United Arab Emirates	Dubai	Al Maktoum International Airport		
United Arab Emirates	Dubai	Dubai International Airport	Terminated	
United Kingdom	Birmingham	Birmingham Airport		
United Kingdom	London	Heathrow Airport		
Uzbekistan	Navoi	Navoi International Airport	Terminated	
Uzbekistan	Tashkent	Islam Karimov Tashkent International Airport	Hub	
Uzbekistan	Urgench	Urgench International Airport		
Vietnam	Hanoi	Noi Bai International Airport		
Vietnam	Ho Chi Minh City	Tan Son Nhat International Airport		

=== Interline Agreements ===
On 1 August 2024 My Freighter and American Airlines have begun an interline partnership that will allow both carriers access to each other's cargo network via North America, the EU and Central Asia. My Freighter with access to 11 different destinations, including New York (JFK), Philadelphia (PHL), Dallas (DFW), Charlotte (CLT), Houston (IAH), Amsterdam (AMS), London (LHR), Paris (CDG), Madrid (MAD) and Munich (MUC).

On 11 September 2024, during the EU Cross-Border E-Commerce Forum in Liège, Belgium, My Freighter and Challenge Group announced a mutually beneficial interline partnership. The agreement allows both carriers to access each other's extensive cargo networks across the US, Europe, Middle East, Africa, and China.

In 2025 The airline joined IATA's MITA (Multilateral Interline Traffic Agreement) program, simplifying multilateral interline arrangements with other carriers.

My Freighter and Air Europa have announced an interline agreement that will allow the former to add flights to the Americas and the latter to expand into Asia. The agreement will give My Freighter access to eight new destinations: Panama City, Cancun, Dominican Republic, Punta Cana, Colombia, Miami, New York and São Paulo. In return, Air Europa will have access to Tashkent as a hub for My Freighter flights and Central Asia through the airline's Road Feeder Service (RFS) trucking network. My Freighter said that the partnership would allow it to send cargo to North and South America as part of its strategy to link "east and west through Central Asia".

In 2025, My Freighter and Aeromexico announced a strategic interline partnership aimed at expanding cargo access and enhancing connectivity between Mexico and Central Asia.

In May 2025, My Freighter ssigned an interline agreement with Icelandair Cargo to open up opportunities for cargo transportation between Central Asia, Europe and North America.

In June 2025, My Freighter has signed an interline agreement with Biman Bangladesh Airlines, the national flag carrier of Bangladesh. The partnership establishes a new cargo corridor between Bangladesh in South Asia and Central Asia, leveraging Biman's wide regional coverage and My Freighter's direct freighter operations from Dubai World Central (DWC) to Tashkent.

In October 2025 My Freighter Airlines has signed an interline agreement with National Air Cargo. This partnership will enhance connectivity between Uzbekistan, the Middle East, Asia, Europe, and the Americas.

In December 2025 the airline has signed an interline agreement with Air Serbia to expand its global cargo connectivity. The partnership will enhance network access, streamline routing options, and improve cargo efficiency across Europe and beyond.

Later in 2025 the interline agreement with Cargojet was signed in order to strengthen Central Asia–North America connectivity and to link Canada with Tashkent via Europe.

In the beginning of 2026 that My Freighter officially announced announces the expansion of its international cooperation through the signing of several interline agreements with carriers in China. These partnerships aim to strengthen the company's transport network and enhance the efficiency of cargo operations between China, Central Asia, and key global markets.

A key partner is SF Airlines, China's largest dedicated cargo carrier, operating a fleet of 90 freighter aircraft from its major hubs in Ezhou (EHU), Shenzhen (SZX), and Hong Kong (HKG).

Interline agreements have also been signed with Chinese passenger airlines Loong Air (based in Hangzhou, HGH) and Juneyao Air (Shanghai, airports PVG and SHA), enabling expanded connection opportunities and improved cargo delivery across domestic and international routes within China. Additionally, Taiwan-based Starlux Airlines has joined My Freighter's partner network, operating flights from Taipei (TPE) to Southeast Asia, Japan, and the United States. The new agreements will significantly expand the airline's network coverage, provide more flexible logistics solutions, and increase cargo delivery speed between China, Central Asia, Europe, and other international markets.

In the beginning of 2026, My Freighter has signed an interline agreement with China Southern Airlines to strengthen air cargo connectivity between Central Asia and China.

In September of 2026, My Freighter has signed interline agreement with Oman Air allowing My Freighter to new opportunities to fly via Oman Air's hub in Muscat (MCT)

== Fleet ==
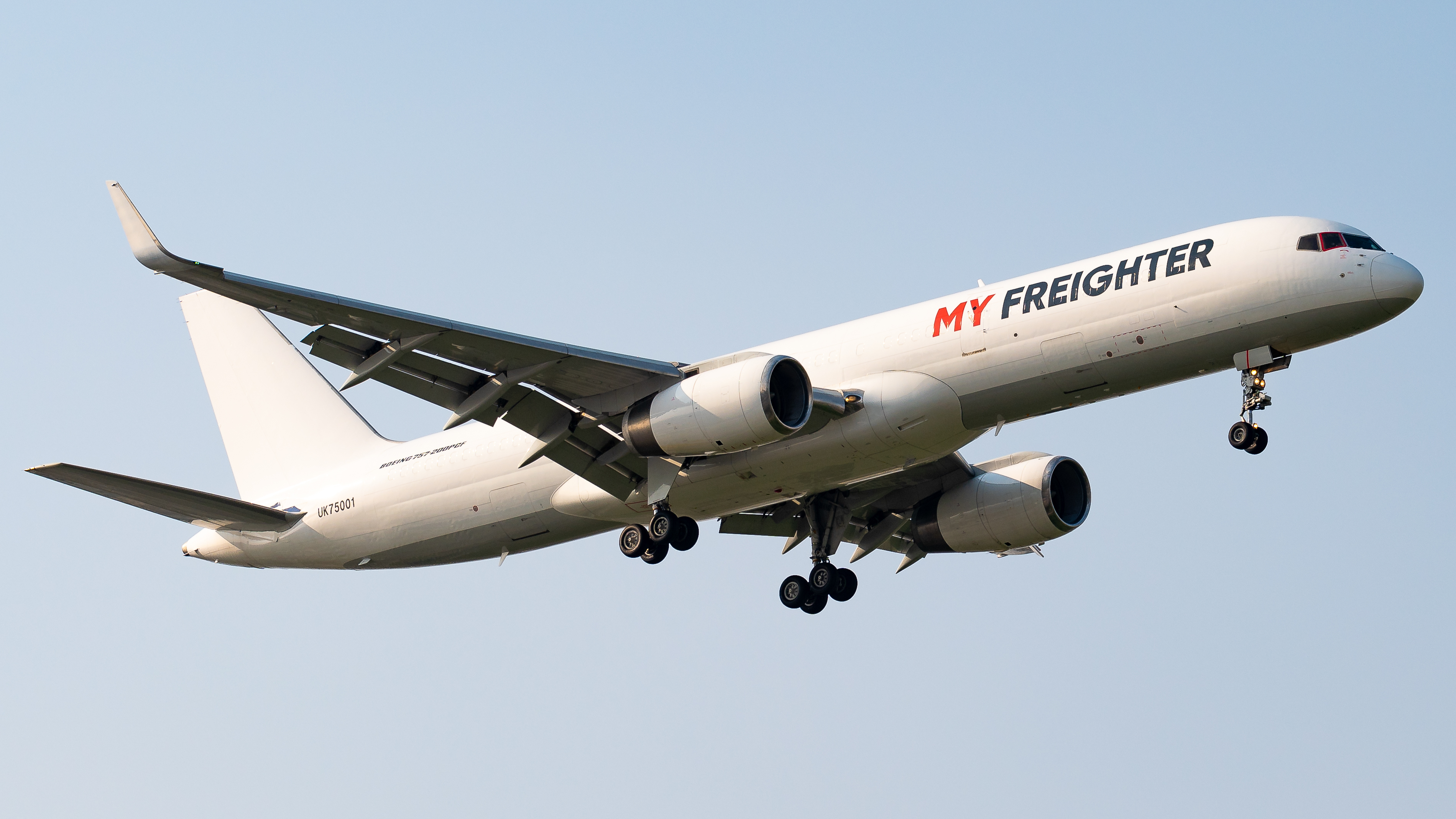
My Freighter Boeing 757F

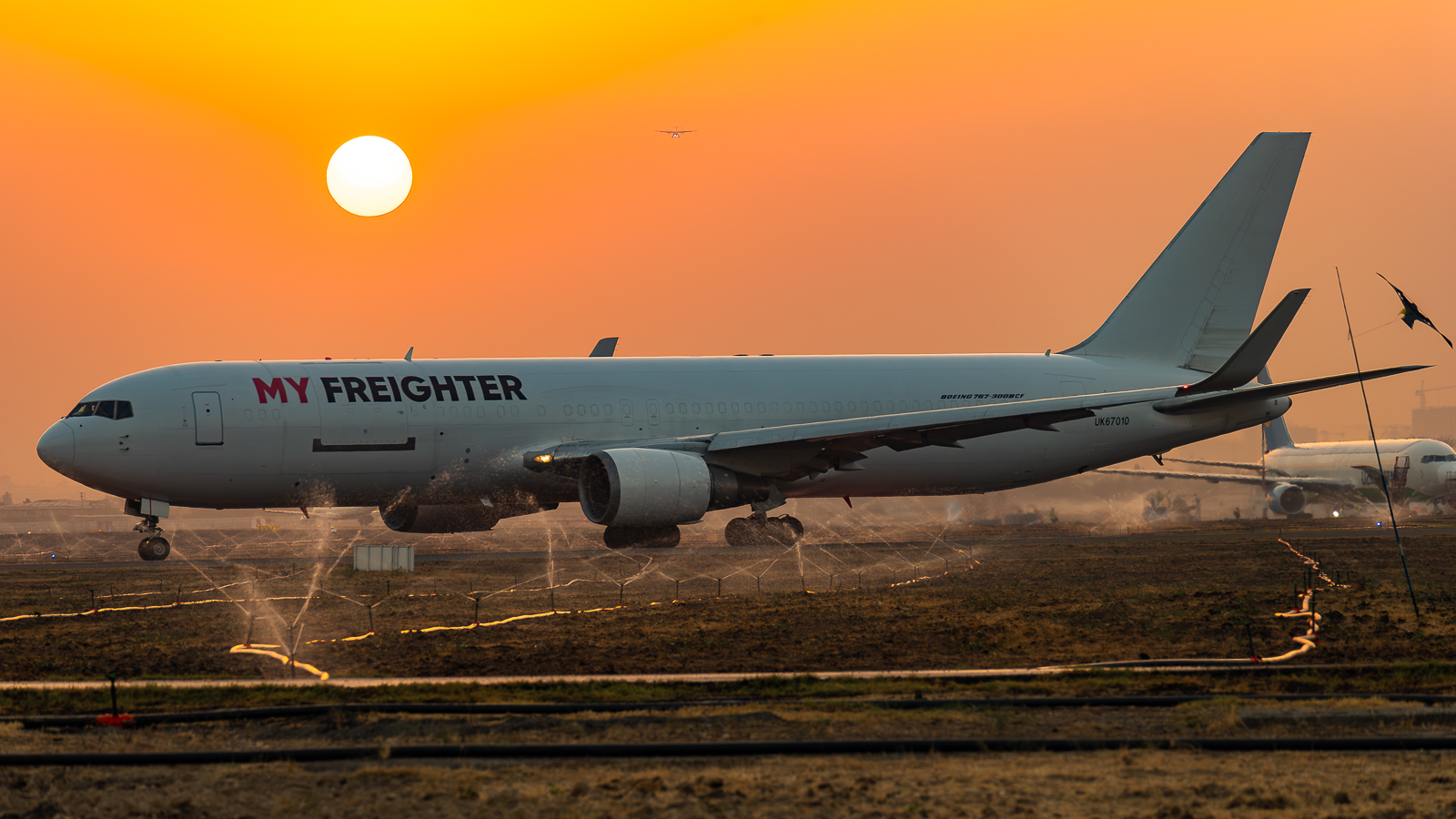
My Freighter Boeing 767

In November 2023 the first Boeing 767 was added to the fleet (previously operated by Air Seychelles, Kenya Airways and Air Canada Rouge. Later the airline also received B-767 aircraft in March 2024, July 2024, December 2024, and May 2025 from Air Transport Services Group.

In October 2022, the airline acquired its only 747-200F aircraft. In April 2024, it was delivered to Moldovan operator Fly Pro, remaining in active service as of March 2026.

In January 2025 Airline has acquired its first Boeing 757-200(PCF) from Titan Aviation Holdings (a subsidiary of Atlas Air Worldwide Holdings).

In April 2026 My Freighter expanded its aviation park with a new Boeing 767. Continuing its practice of honoring historical figures, the airline has named the new freighter after Abdulla Qodiriy.

In October 2026 the cargo airline has added a new Boeing 767-300F (registration UK67023), to its fleet. The aircraft is the tenth Boeing 767 in the carrier’s fleet, bringing the company’s total number of aircraft to eleven. It bears the name of Zahiriddin Muhammad Babur, a native of Andijan, poet, statesman and founder of the Mughal Empire.

As of October 2026, Airline operates the following fleet:

My Freighter Airlines fleet
Aircraft	In service	Orders	Notes
Boeing 757-200PCF	1	—	acquired from Atlas Air Worldwide Holdings
Boeing 767-300ER	10	—	incl. 4 Boeing 767-300ER (BCF) and 4 Boeing 767-300ER (BDSF)
Total	11		

== Social Impact ==
In October 2023 My Freighter Airlines participated in delivering nearly 100 tons of humanitarian aid to the people of Afghanistan, in response to the earthquake. Aid included food products like flour, wheat, oil, pasta, meat products, rice, and sugar. Additionally, the humanitarian aid contained tents, blankets, and medical supplies for providing initial medical assistance.

The cargo was transported to Afghanistan by the airline's Boeing 747 aircraft.
