= Balkanabat Airport =

Airport in Balkanabat, Balkan Province, Turkmenistan

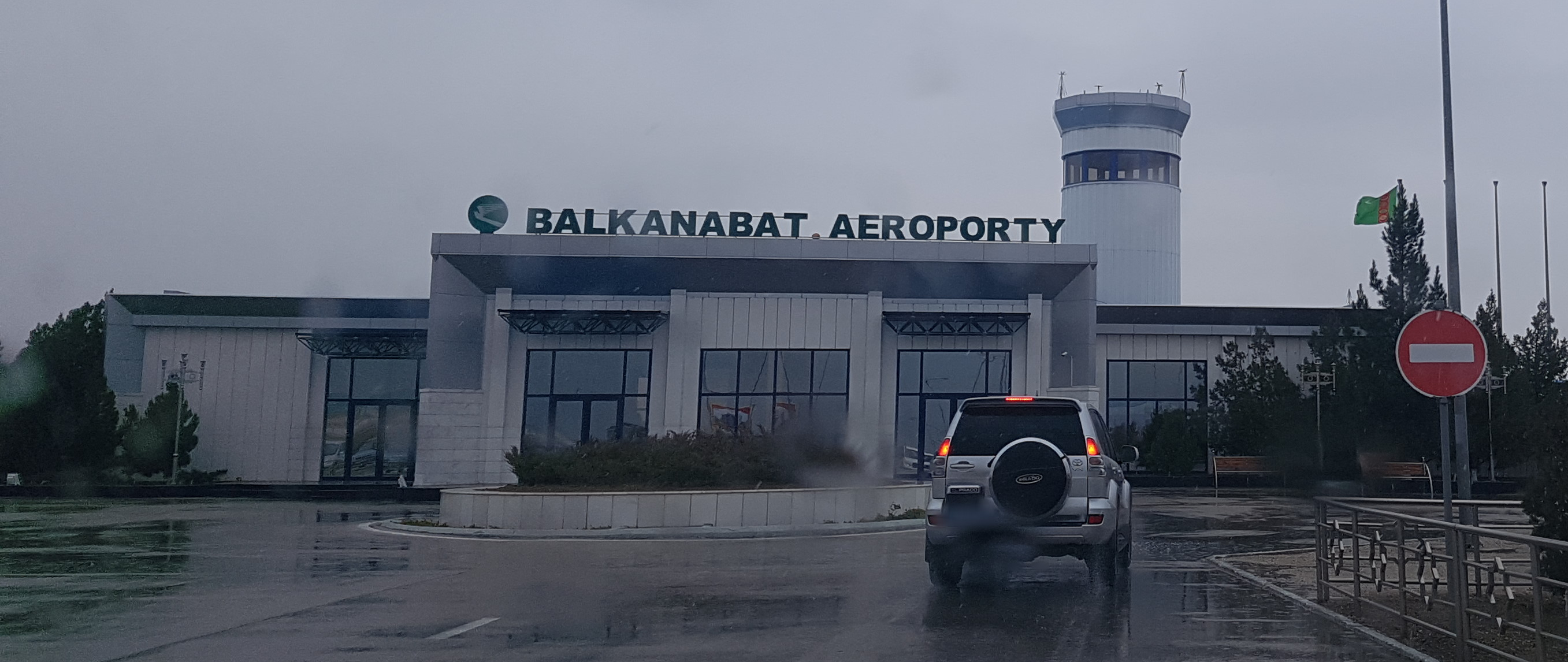
- IATA: none; ICAO: none

Summary
- Airport type: Closed
- Serves: Balkanabat, Turkmenistan
- Location: Balkanabat, Turkmenistan
- Elevation AMSL: 2 m / 7 ft
- Coordinates: 39°28′53″N 54°21′46″E

Map
- Location of the airport in Turkmenistan

Runways
Direction	Length		Surface
Direction	m	ft	Surface
11/29	2,500	8,202	Concrete
- Sources: WAD, GCM, STV

Balkanabat Airport (Turkmen: Balkanabat aeroporty), also known as Nebit Dag Airport, was a provincial airport located 4.5 kilometres (2.8 mi) southeast of Balkanabat in Turkmenistan. In May 2025, a new Balkanabat International Airport was opened and replaced the old airport.

== History ==
The opening ceremony of the new Balkanabat Airport terminal was held on 7 November 2004. The terminal building is spread over 3,500 square metres and has a capacity of handling 200 passengers per hour. The runway can handle aircraft weighing up to 150 tonnes.

In July 2021, 20 kilometers from the city of Balkanabat, construction began on the new Balkanabat International Airport, which opened in May 2025.
