= Balkanabat =

Capital of Balkan Province, Turkmenistan

Balkanabat Balkanabat şäheri
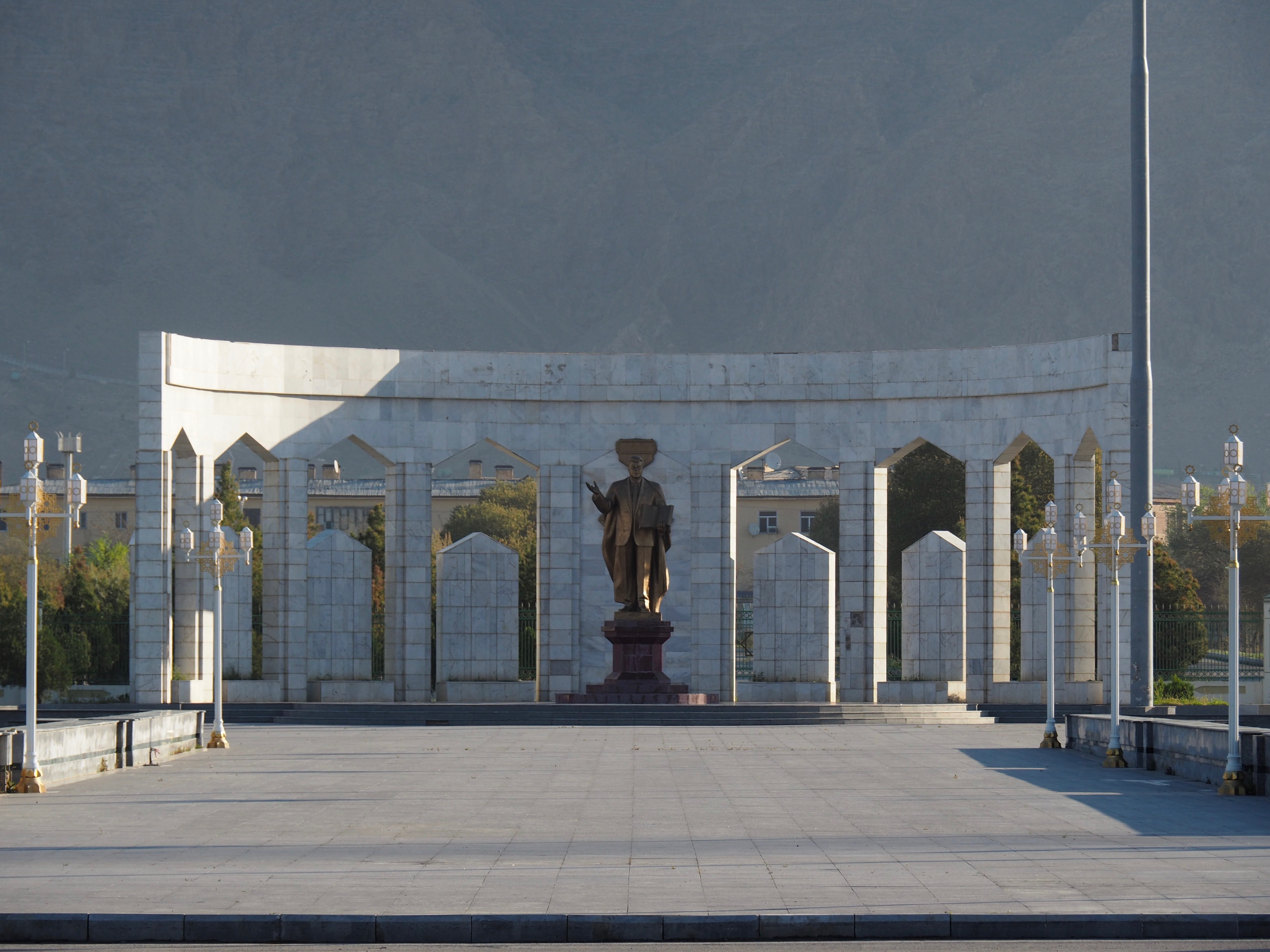
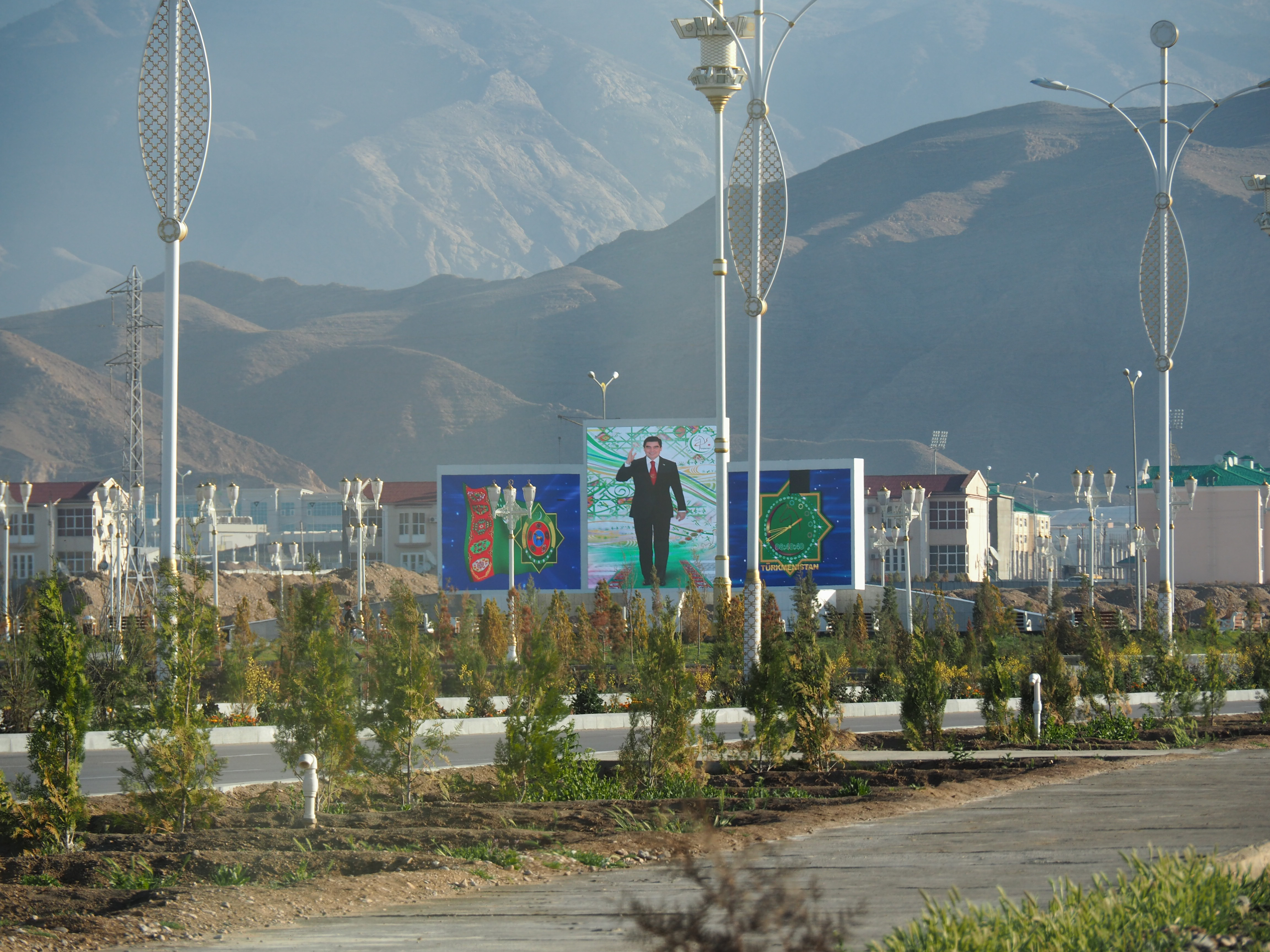
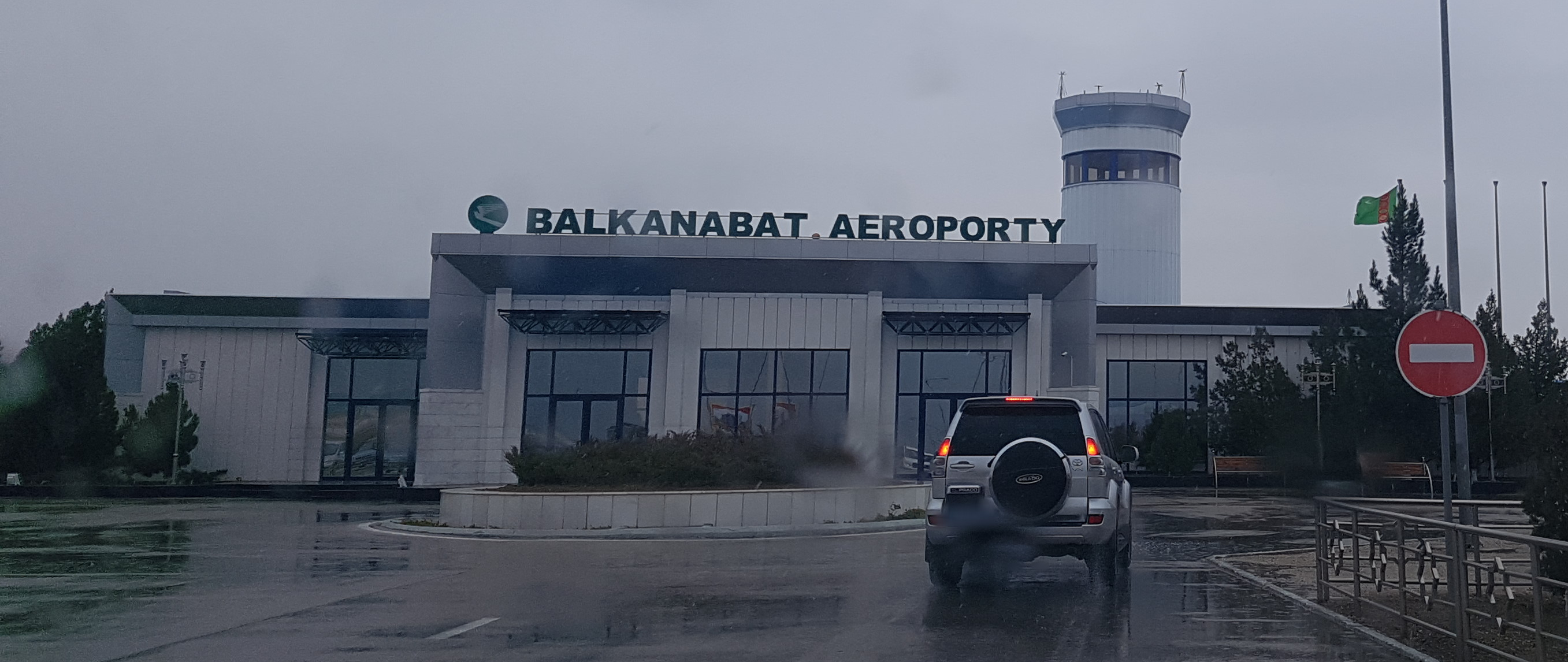

- Location in Turkmenistan
- Coordinates: 39°31′00″N 54°22′00″E
- Country: Turkmenistan
- Province: Balkan Province
- Established: 1933

Government
  - Mayor: Balkan Gulmamedov

Area
  - Total: 11,290 km^{2} (4,360 sq mi)
- Elevation: 17 m (56 ft)

Population (2025 estimate)
  - Total: 87,822
  - Density: 7.779/km^{2} (20.15/sq mi)
- Time zone: UTC+5
- postal code: 745100
- Area code: (+993-222)
- Vehicle registration: BN

Balkanabat (Turkmen: Balkanabat şäheri), formerly Nebit-Dag and Neftedag, is the administrative centre of Balkan Province, the largest province in Turkmenistan. It lies at the foot of the Balkan Daglary mountain range. Balkanabat is about 450 km west of Ashgabat and 160 km east of the seaport city of Türkmenbaşy. The city layout is a grid of apartment blocks called kvartal (quarters). The main streets are Magtymguly, Pervomayskiy and Gurbansoltan eje şaýoly.

== Etymology ==
The town was founded in 1933 as Neftedag, meaning "Oil Mountain" (Russian neft, "oil", and Turkmen dag, "mountain"), as a settlement along one of the stations of the Trans-Caspian Railway. In 1946, when it was transformed into a city, it was renamed "Nebit-Dag", also meaning "Oil Mountain", but this time using the Turkmen word nebit. Nebit Dag was renamed Balkanabat (Balkan from the name of the Balkan mountains (not to be confused with the Balkan mountains in Bulgaria), abat – meaning “settlement” in Persian) in 2001 by decree of former President of Turkmenistan Saparmurat Niyazov.

== Administrative Subdivisions ==
The city of Balkanabat, being a district-level city, acting as a district, has urban and rural settlements under its jurisdiction. The hierarchy is as follows:

- Balkanabat, city
  - Gumdag, town
  - Hazar, town
    - Garagöl, village
  - Jebel, town
    - 123-nji duralga, village
    - Mollagara, village
    - Zähmet, village
  - Oglanly, town
    - Oglanly, village
  - Uzboý, town

Balkanabat itself is made up of several microdistricts.

== History ==
A large monument at the far western end of the city, "Pioneers" (Russian: Первопроходцы), also called "Desert Explorers", depicts a camel, Ivan Gubkin, and Gubkin's peers, struggling to hike through the windy Karakum Desert while prospecting for petroleum. Balkanabat's history is tightly linked to the petroleum deposits in Goturdepe, Barsagelmes and Nebitdag. The first colonists had to live in unbelievable conditions in tents, tilt carts, without power and even without water.

== Amenities ==
The city adjoins a "Health Path", a concrete circuit hike path to give a moderate hike along the mountainside. It was opened in 2004 in the template of that of Ashgabat. The city has five bazaars (markets) Gök, Jennet, Gündogar, Bereket and 5th Microdistrict bazaar. The city is served by two hotels, Nebitçi and Sport, a theater, museums, restaurants and parks. The north side of town features the large Saparmyrat Türkmenbaşy Park, which offers trees, tennis courts, a life-size chess board and many benches.

In the 2000s, the city underwent significant transformations, including the improvement of streets, the construction of large-scale housing facilities, and the addition of supplementary amenities. The State Drama Theater, the Museum of History and Local Lore, a diagnostic center, a wedding palace, the Balkanabat Railway Station, the Balkan Provincial Library, a stadium with 10,000 seats, a general oriental market, and other social and cultural facilities were built during that period.

== Demographics ==
In 2011, the population was estimated to be 120,800 residents, 80% of them Turkmen (mainly Yomud tribe), 15% Russians, 3% Kazakhs, 2% Azerbaijanis, 10% others, including Lezgins, Armenians, Uzbeks, Tatars, and Jews. The Yomud tribe is associated with the Balkan region and the Yomud carpet göl (rosette) is one of the five rosettes represented on the Turkmen flag.

== Climate ==
Balkanabat has a cold desert climate (BWk) according to the Köppen climate classification.

Climate data for Balkanabat
Month	Jan	Feb	Mar	Apr	May	Jun	Jul	Aug	Sep	Oct	Nov	Dec	Year
Mean daily maximum °C (°F)	7.9 (46.2)	10.0 (50.0)	15.8 (60.4)	23.7 (74.7)	30.3 (86.5)	35.4 (95.7)	38.1 (100.6)	37.2 (99.0)	31.9 (89.4)	23.2 (73.8)	16.4 (61.5)	9.9 (49.8)	23.3 (73.9)
Daily mean °C (°F)	3.2 (37.8)	4.6 (40.3)	10.0 (50.0)	17.3 (63.1)	23.6 (74.5)	28.8 (83.8)	31.5 (88.7)	31.1 (88.0)	25.9 (78.6)	17.5 (63.5)	11.1 (52.0)	5.5 (41.9)	17.5 (63.5)
Mean daily minimum °C (°F)	−0.6 (30.9)	0.4 (32.7)	5.4 (41.7)	11.9 (53.4)	17.8 (64.0)	22.5 (72.5)	25.7 (78.3)	25.5 (77.9)	19.7 (67.5)	12.2 (54.0)	6.8 (44.2)	1.9 (35.4)	12.4 (54.3)
Average precipitation mm (inches)	11 (0.4)	14 (0.6)	21 (0.8)	19 (0.7)	17 (0.7)	5 (0.2)	8 (0.3)	2 (0.1)	4 (0.2)	12 (0.5)	14 (0.6)	16 (0.6)	143 (5.6)
Average precipitation days (≥ 1.0 mm)	6	5	7	6	4	2	2	1	2	4	5	7	51
Average relative humidity (%)	68	63	56	50	43	38	41	34	34	46	58	70	50
Source: NOAA

== Industry, economy and transport ==
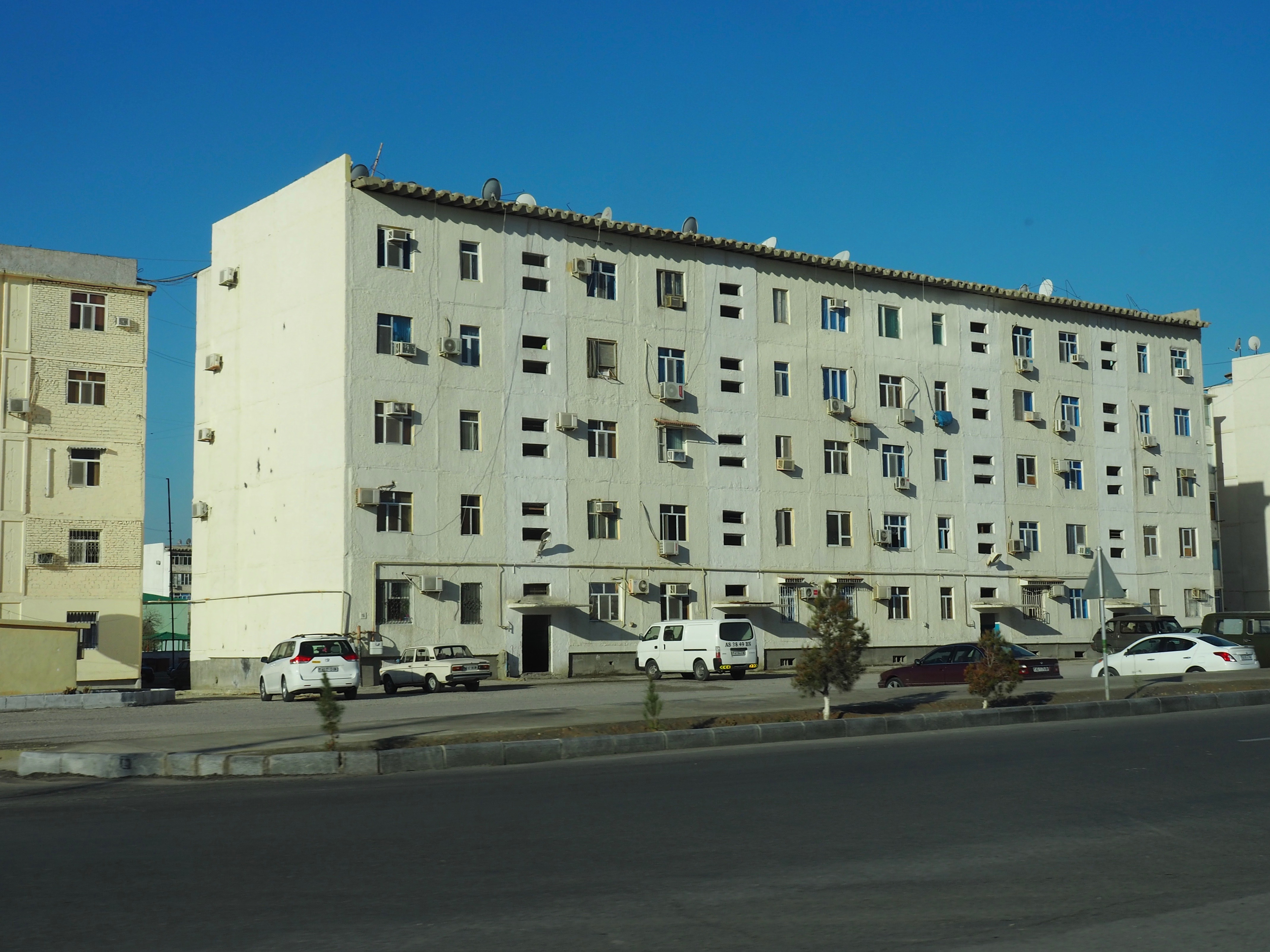
Apartment blocks in Balkanabat

The city is an industrial center for petroleum and natural gas production. A branch office of the Russian petroleum company Tatneft is located in Balkanabat. Animal husbandry and production of wheat and cotton are other pursuits.

== Transport ==
The city lies on the east–west M37 highway and is connected to other cities by rail and bus. While there is no official cab company, private citizens operate shared cabs.

=== Air ===
The Balkanabat Airport terminal was opened in October 2004 with a design capacity of 200 passengers per hour.

In July 2021, 20 kilometers from the city of Balkanabat, construction began on the new Balkanabat International Airport, which opened in May 2025. The airport is located in Jebel, 20 kilometers northwest of the city of Balkanabat and 4 kilometers from the Mollagara mud resort. The airport was constructed with a design capacity to accommodate up to 100 passengers per hour.

Currently, Turkmenistan Airlines operates flights from Balkanabat to Aşgabat, Daşoguz, Mary, Türkmenabat, Kerki.

=== Rail ===
Balkanabat sits on the Trans-Caspian Railway running east–west, connecting the capital, Ashgabat, with the Balkan Region. The railway offers both passenger and freight transport. Balkanabat Railway Station is the city's main rail station.

== Communication ==
The city has one mobile operator, Altyn Asyr. Internet access and cable TV are provided by Turkmentelecom. There is one internet cafe in the city. Turkmenpochta is the official national postal service of Turkmenistan. It currently operates four post offices in the city.

== Education ==
The city has an Oil and Gas Industry School, which operates as a branch of the International Oil and Gas University. The school trains students in such specialties as geology, drilling of oil and gas wells, development and operation of oil and gas fields, chemical technology of oil and gas processing, construction, operation of oil and gas storage, and oil and gas pipeline operation. It is the functional successor to the Polytechnic Institute, which was an extension of the Gubkin Russian State University of Oil and Gas in Moscow during the Soviet period.

High school graduates may receive secondary-specialized education in the following vocational schools: Balkanabat Medical School, Special School of Arts, Financial and Economic Secondary Vocational School, and Oil Secondary Vocational School of the Turkmennebit State Concern.

== Religion ==
The vast majority of the population adheres to Sunni Islam. The main mosque of Balkan Province has a capacity of 3,000 worshippers. Four minarets, each 63 meters high, rise above the two-story mosque. The Russian Orthodox Church of the Nativity of the Holy Virgin has operated since 1997 in the 13th microdistrict.

== Culture ==
A giant yurt-shaped building, Türkmeniň ak öýi ("Turkmen White House") was built for special events in 2021. The complex includes a concert hall with 3,000 seats and additional buildings, as well as a special sadaqah hall of the same capacity.

== Healthcare ==
On October 11, 2026, Mother and Child Health Center was opened in Balkanabat. The 305-bed medical complex features a 10-bed neonatal intensive care unit alongside specialized maternity, gynecology, and diagnostic facilities.

== Notable people ==
- Gulshat Orazmuhammedova (born 1974), Turkmen statesman

== Media ==
The daily state newspaper Balkan is published in Balkanabat.

== Twin towns and sister cities ==
- Almetyevsk

== Sports ==
The city features the Balkanabat Sport Toplumy stadium, at which is based the Nebitçi professional football club, which plays in the Ýokary Liga ("Upper League").

== See also ==
- Balkanabat Stadium
- FC Balkan
- Railway stations in Turkmenistan
