= Balkan Mountains (Turkmenistan) =

Mountain range in Turkmenistan

Uly Balkan
- Uly Balkan from the ISS

Highest point
- Peak: Mount Arlan
- Elevation: 1,880 m (6,170 ft)
- Coordinates: 39°40′N 54°34′E

Dimensions
- Length: 70 km (43 mi)

Geography
- Location within Turkmenistan
- Country: Turkmenistan

Balkhan Ranges or Balkan Ranges, also Balkhans, Balkans (Turkmen: Balkan daglary, Balkan Mountains) are mountains by the eastern shores of the Caspian Sea in the Balkan Region of Turkmenistan. They consist of the Greater Balkan, or Uly Balkan and the Lesser Balkan Kiçi Balkan. They are separated by Uzboy, a dried-out distributary of the Amu Darya.
