= Jubal Brown =

Canadian video producer and multi-media artist

Jubal Brown (born c. 1974) is a video producer and multi-media artist based in Toronto, Ontario, Canada. He gained notoriety in 1996 when he deliberately vomited primary colours on paintings in the Art Gallery of Ontario in Toronto, and the Museum of Modern Art in New York.

Brown has made a number of videos, many of which have been screened in North America and Europe. Canadian Art magazine called Brown "the dark prince of Toronto art".

In 2021 Brown published his first novel entitled DIE SCUM, Sex & Drugs & Contemporary Art. The story of a drug-dealer to the art scene, this autofiction is a highly personal and often humorous account of love and addiction, published by IMPULSE-b multiples & artists' book publishers.

== Biography ==
Jubal Brown graduated from the Ontario College of Art and Design, and is a founding member of the famefame media-art collective.

Brown has made a number of videos that have been screened in North America and Europe. His works have been well received in London, and Canadian Art magazine called some of them "the most provocative and intelligent (and often very funny) video works to come out of Toronto in years". Many of his videos are made up of hundreds of brief samples taken from mainstream media, all packed together to create a "hyper-dense, jittery, relentless (and often deeply disturbing) audiovisual assault". Brown said that his intention was to "push the ideas of mass media to their logical and ridiculous conclusions: sex, death, speed, power". He believes that there is a lot of "useless information" in films, and his videos condense the material into "its one telling moment". He said that "our generation is raised on media and we can therefore eat a lot more, much more quickly."

The Blob (9 min) is a video Brown released in 2000 which includes cut-ups of the 1958 science fiction/horror film, The Blob, its 1988 remake, plus many other media sources themed on paranoia. Operation (1999) is a 10-minute recording of Brown performing surgery on himself. In the spirit of body-art mutilation, he attempts to remove a lump of fat on his torso with a pocket knife. When Operation was shown in London, many viewers had to look away, which is the effect the video set out to achieve. Life Is Pornography (2005, 23 min) includes clips of genocides rated as video game scores, stills of "horrible" images, like a picture of someone's eye with a nail through it, and a rework of fragments of the Britney Spears video, Toxic. A voice-over calls pornography the "reduction of human culture into exploitable parts". Mike Hoolboom writing in Practical Dreamers: Conversations With Movie Artists called Life Is Pornography "a deeply wounded, romantic and despairing tape".

Brown released his longest video, Total War (53 min) in 2008. He said it "brings together a lot of the ideas, emotionally and technically, I've been developing over the past 10 years". The video highlights the media excesses that modern warfare evokes. Brown believes Iraq was the first "YouTube war", and Total War includes YouTube clips, network news clips, action film scenes, TV sitcom fragments, and other "found-footage". ArtUS described Total War as Brown's first "breakout work", with elements of streams of consciousness, in contrast to his previous fast-paced, trance-like mashups.

=== Controversies ===
In 1996, Brown vandalised two paintings in art galleries by vomiting on them. The first was on May 15 in the Art Gallery of Ontario in Toronto, where he threw up red vomit on Raoul Dufy's Harbor at le Havre after eating red gelatin and red cake icing. The second attack was on November 2 in the Museum of Modern Art in New York, when he ate blue Jell-O and blue cake icing and projectile-vomited in blue on Piet Mondrian's Composition With Red and Blue.

Neither of the paintings was damaged and both were successfully cleaned. The galleries initially believed that the incidents were accidental, but in early December 1996, Brown admitted that his actions were deliberate. He said that they were part of a "performance art trilogy" entitled "Responding to Art" that targeted "oppressively trite and painfully banal" works. He said Harbor at le Havre "was just so boring it needed some colour", and he found Composition With Red and Blue "lifelessness threatening". The Ontario College of Art and Design called Brown's behaviour "reprehensible in the extreme" and issued apologies to the museums in Toronto and New York, but took no further action against him. Brown's intention was to attack three paintings, each with one of the three primary colours: blue, red and yellow, but, as far as we know, he never completed the trilogy with yellow.

In 2001 Brown defended a student at his bail hearing after he was arrested in Toronto for being one of three students who had made a 17-minute video of a cat being skinned alive and beheaded. The students from the Ontario College of Art and Design claimed it was "a work of art" and "a political statement condemning meat consumption". Brown said, "I don't support the killing of animals for food or art. But whether it is art is not for us to answer."

== Selected videography ==
Source: Practical Dreamers: Conversations With Movie Artists

- Fuck the Black Hole (1997, 5 min)
- Dead Museum (1999, 10 min)
- Intimate Moment (1999, 5 min)
- Operation (1999, 10 min)
- The Blob (2000, 9 min)
- Deathday Suit (2002, 8:41 min)
- Speed (2002, 11 min)
- Satanism, Just Be Yourself (2003, 6 min)
- The Worst Ever (2003, 7 min)
- The 6th Day (2004, 9:25 min)
- The Blackness (2004, 15 min)
- In Bloom (2004, 15 min)
- Life Is Pornography (2005, 23 min)
- We're in Heaven (2005, 33 min)
- Party Tap #52 (2006, 6 min)
- Total War (2008, 53 min)

== Selected exhibitions ==
Source: Experimental Television Center

- Images Festival (Toronto)
- Canada House (London)
- Art Basel (Switzerland)
- Toronto International Art Fair (Toronto)
- Art Gallery of Nova Scotia (Halifax)

== See also ==
- Video art
- Visual music

== Cited works ==
- Hoolboom, Mike (May 2008). "Jubal Brown: Life is Pornography". Practical Dreamers: Conversations With Movie Artists. Coach House Books. pp. 281–292. ISBN 978-1-55245-200-4.
