= Balkanabat International Airport =

Airport in Turkmenistan

Balkanabat International Airport Balkanabat halkara howa menzili
- IATA: BKN; ICAO: UTAN

Summary
- Airport type: Public
- Owner: Turkmenhowayollary State Service
- Serves: Jebel, Balkanabat
- Location: Jebel, Balkan Region, Turkmenistan
- Opened: Ceremony: 2 May 2025; 14 months ago; All passenger services: 19 May 2025; 13 months ago
- Focus city for: Turkmenistan Airlines
- Time zone: TMT (UTC+05:00)
- Coordinates: 39°40′42″N 054°12′28″E
- Website: jebairport.gov.tm
- Interactive map of Balkanabat International Airport

Runways
Direction	Length		Surface
Direction	m	ft	Surface
16/34	3,200	10,499	Asphalt

Balkanabat International Airport (IATA: BKN, ICAO: UTAN) is an airport to serve Balkanabat and the Balkan Region in Turkmenistan. Is one of six international airports in the country. The airport is located in Jebel, 20 kilometers northwest of the city of Balkanabat and 4 kilometers from the Mollagara mud resort. The airport was constructed with a design capacity to accommodate up to 100 passengers per hour.

It was officially opened on May 2, 2025, and started commercial service on May 19 in the same year, replacing the previous Balkanabat Airport as the city's main airport. During the construction period, it was referred to in the media as Jebel Airport.

== History ==
A tender for the construction of a new airport in Jebel, Balkan Province, was announced in December 2020 by the Ministry of Construction and Architecture of Turkmenistan.

On June 10, 2021, the Abu Dhabi Fund for Development allocated a $75 million loan for the construction of the airport in Jebel, Balkan Region. The loan, provided to State Bank for Foreign Economic Affairs of Turkmenistan, has a 15-year term, including a 3-year grace period, with an interest rate of 4% per annum.

On July 14, 2021, a groundbreaking ceremony was held for the future airport, which is designed to handle 100 passengers per hour.

Construction began in August 2022. The international airport in Jebel is being constructed on a 275-hectare site by the Turkmen private enterprise Gündogdy.

As of February 2024, the construction of a transformer substation, a specialized water reservoir, and fire station facilities was nearing completion. A 35-meter tower for air traffic control staff and additional technical facilities were also under construction.

Balkanabat International Airport in Turkmenistan was officially opened on May 2, 2025. Meanwhile, a previously existing regional Balkanabat Airport bearing the same name was located approximately 20 kilometers away. The airport was built as part of Turkmenistan's National Socio-Economic Development Program and the National Program for the Development of Civil Aviation through 2030. It has received international registration with the ICAO (code: UTAN) and a certificate of compliance with IATA standards (code: BKN).

The first domestic flights to the airport began on 19 May 2025. The Turkmenistan Airlines launched services on the following routes: Ashgabat–Balkanabat–Ashgabat, Turkmenabat–Balkanabat–Turkmenabat, Mary–Balkanabat–Mary, and Dashoguz–Balkanabat–Dashoguz. At the same time, the Belarusian airline Belavia launched international flights from Minsk to Balkanabat. This route was operated from May 20 to August 9, 2025.

== Infrastructure ==
The airport complex will cover an area of 275 hectares. The site will include passenger and cargo terminals, an 35-metre air traffic control tower, and facilities for rescue and firefighting services.

The three-story passenger terminal, with a total area of 5,203 square meters, is designed to handle up to 100 passengers per hour. The airport infrastructure includes an internet café, a buffet, a souvenir shop, a medical station, waiting lounges, a hotel, and a covered parking facility.

The runway will have a length of 3,200 meters. The airport will also be equipped with ground support systems capable of handling all types of aircraft.

The apron will accommodate 6 airplanes and 4 helicopters.

State-of-the-art navigation, lighting, and meteorological equipment will be supplied by international companies such as Thales, Indra, Motorola, and Rohde & Schwarz.

There are also a 20-bed pilots' hotel, a specialised aircraft servicing vehicle depot, a transformer substation, water storage tanks, external water supply systems and auxiliary buildings.

== Access ==
The international airport in Jebel, Balkan Region, Turkmenistan, is being constructed 20 kilometers northwest of the city of Balkanabat and 4 kilometers from the Mollagara mud resort. Jebel is located at the junction of the M37 highway and the P-17 highway, which leads to the Cheleken Peninsula.

== Airlines and destinations ==
As of September 2025, Balkanabat International Airport serves flights operated by the following airlines:

=== Passenger ===
Airlines	Destinations
Turkmenistan Airlines	Aşgabat, Daşoguz, Mary, Türkmenabat, Kerki

== See also ==
- List of airports in Turkmenistan
- Ashgabat International Airport

== Links ==
- Official web-site
- Opening ceremony of the Balkanabat International Airport
