= Jebel, Turkmenistan =

Town in Balkanabat, Balkan Province, Turkmenistan

Jebel Jebel şäherçesi
- Town
- Location in Turkmenistan
- Coordinates: 39°37′51″N 54°14′14″E
- Country: Turkmenistan
- Province: Balkan Province
- District: Balkanabat

Population (2022 official census)
  - Town: 15,816
  - Urban: 15,056
  - Rural: 760
- Time zone: UTC+5

Jebel is a town in Balkan Province, Turkmenistan. It is subordinate to the city of Balkanabat and the nearest municipality to the Mollagara Sanitorium, which is four kilometers distant. As of 2022, Jebel reached a population of 15,056 people.

== Etymology ==
Jebel means "mountain" in Arabic, and refers in this case to a nearby peak in the Balkhan Range.

== Economy ==
Jebel serves as a support and logistics center for oil extraction operations in Balkan Province, particularly on the Cheleken Peninsula. It is also a center for mining and milling of table salt. In 2008 a kaolin plant was opened in Jebel. In 2011 Turkish Polimeks built Turkmenistan's largest cement plant in Jebel, capable of producing one million tons of cement per year. In 2014 a plant was opened for packaging medicinal mud and sea salt.

== Archeological site ==
Four kilometers east of the Jebel train station in the Greater Balkhan range is the Jebel cave, in which A.P. Okladnikov found in 1949-1950 a multilayer archeological site dating from the Mesolithic through the Neolithic and Early Bronze ages.

== Transportation ==
The Balkanabat International Airport is located a few kilometers away from Jebel. The airport accepts domestic and international flights.

Jebel is located at the junction of the M37 highway and the P-17 highway, which leads to the Cheleken Peninsula.

The rail line between Türkmenbaşy and Ashgabat passes through Jebel, which has its own rail station.

== Population ==
1959	1970	1979	1989	2022
4389	6353	7978	7697	15056

== Dependencies ==
Jebel as a town has 3 dependent rural village:

Jebel, town:

- 123-nji duralga, village
- Mollagara, village
- Zähmet, village
