= Türkmenabat International Airport =

International airport in Türkmenabat, Lebap Province, Turkmenistan

Türkmenabat International Airport Türkmenabat halkara howa menzili
- IATA: CRZ; ICAO: UTAV

Summary
- Operator: Turkmenhowayollary Agency
- Location: Türkmenabat, Lebap Region, Turkmenistan
- Elevation AMSL: 649 ft / 198 m
- Coordinates: 38°55′51″N 063°33′50″E
- Website: http://www.tia.gov.tm

Map
- Location of the airport in Turkmenistan

Runways
Direction	Length		Surface
Direction	m	ft	Surface
13/31	3,800	12,467	Concrete
- Source: AIP Turkmenistan

Türkmenabat International Airport (Turkmen: Türkmenabat halkara howa meňzili), (IATA: CRZ, ICAO: UTAV) is an international airport in Türkmenabat, Turkmenistan. It is located approximately 13 km from the center of the city.

== History ==
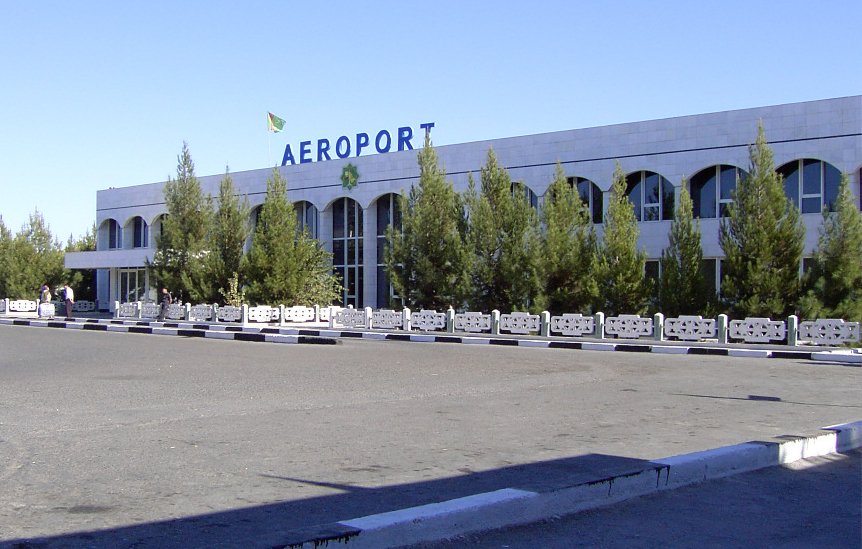
Former airport building

The original airport was opened in 1926 and was repeatedly reconstructed. Radical reconstruction took place during the years of independence of Turkmenistan. The former airport was equipped with a modern air navigation system along with a platform for automated fueling. The runway was also extended.

=== New airport ===
In 2013 construction started on a new airport complex south of downtown Türkmenabat. The ceremony of laying the first stone on 14 February 2013 was attended by President of Ukraine Viktor Yanukovych and President of Turkmenistan Gurbanguly Berdimuhamedov.

Final construction was carried out by the Turkmen private construction firm Gündogdy, a member of the Union of Industrialists and Entrepreneurs of Turkmenistan. The passenger terminal building occupies 37 thousand square meters.

On 26 February 2018, the opening ceremony of the new airport took place, which President of Turkmenistan Gurbanguly Berdimuhamedow attended. The capacity of the airport complex is 500 passengers per hour. The runway is 3800 meters long and 65 meters wide, and is equipped with modern light-signal and meteorological systems. The airport is capable of accepting any type of aircraft. The airport cargo terminal is designed to handle 200 thousand tons of cargo per year. A centralized refueling station allows service of several aircraft simultaneously.

The airport passenger terminal, the roof of which is shaped in an octagonal "star of Oguz Han", covers an area of more than 12 thousand square meters, and is noted in the Guinness Book of Records as the largest star-shaped building in the world.

== Airlines and destinations ==
=== Passenger ===
Airlines	Destinations
Turkmenistan Airlines	Ashgabat, Balkanabat , Daşoguz

=== Cargo ===
Airlines	Destinations
MNG Airlines	Ankara, Chengdu, Istanbul, Hong Kong
Georgian Airlines	Tbilisi
My Freighter	Tashkent
Geosky	Zaragosa, Zhengzhou, Paris, Tbilisi

== Airport facilities ==
There are information boards, an international and long-distance communication center, left-luggage offices, cafeterias, cafes, buffets, and shopping pavilions at the service of passengers. There are a CIP-hall, duty free shops, Internet cafes and other services.

The airport has a medical center, a dining room, a hotel with 100 rooms, and a covered parking lot.

== Ground transportation ==
The airport is located within the city limits, 13 kilometers from downtown Türkmenabat, in close proximity to the M37 Ashgabat-Türkmenabat highway and the Ashgabat-Kerki railway.
