= Uly Balkan =

Mountain range in Turkmenistan

- Location within Turkmenistan

Highest point
- Peak: Mount Arlan
- Elevation: 1,880 m (6,170 ft)
- Coordinates: 39°40′N 54°34′E

Dimensions
- Length: 70 km (43 mi)

Geography
- Country: Turkmenistan

The Uly Balkan (Turkmen: Uly Balkan dagy, Greater Balkan Mountains), also the Great Balkhan or Greater Balkhan is a mountain range in Turkmenistan, part of the Balkhan Ranges. The highest summit is Mount Arlan at 1,880 metres (6,170 ft).

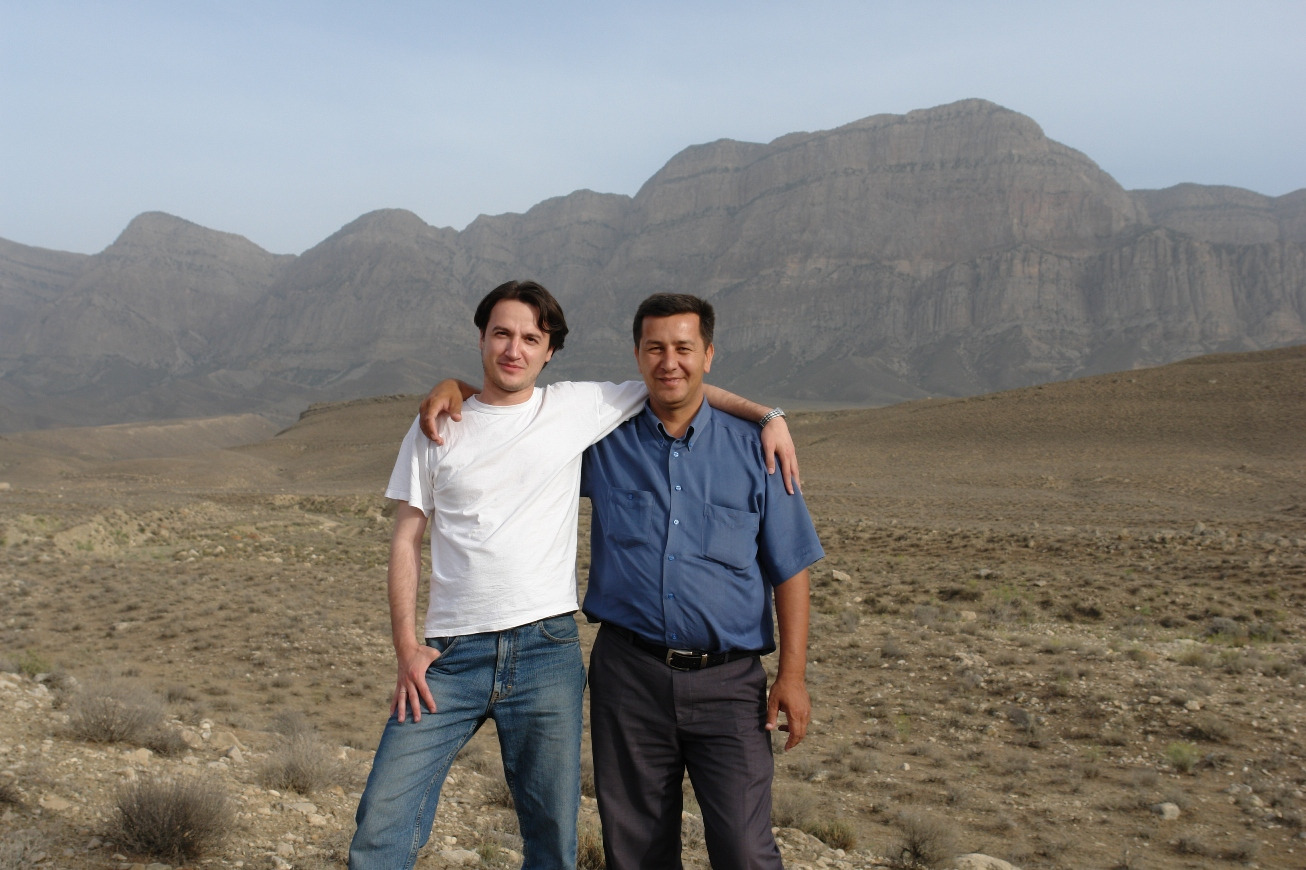
Part of the Balkan range in the background.
