= Ports and harbours in Turkmenistan =

This article provides a list of the maritime ports and harbours of Turkmenistan.

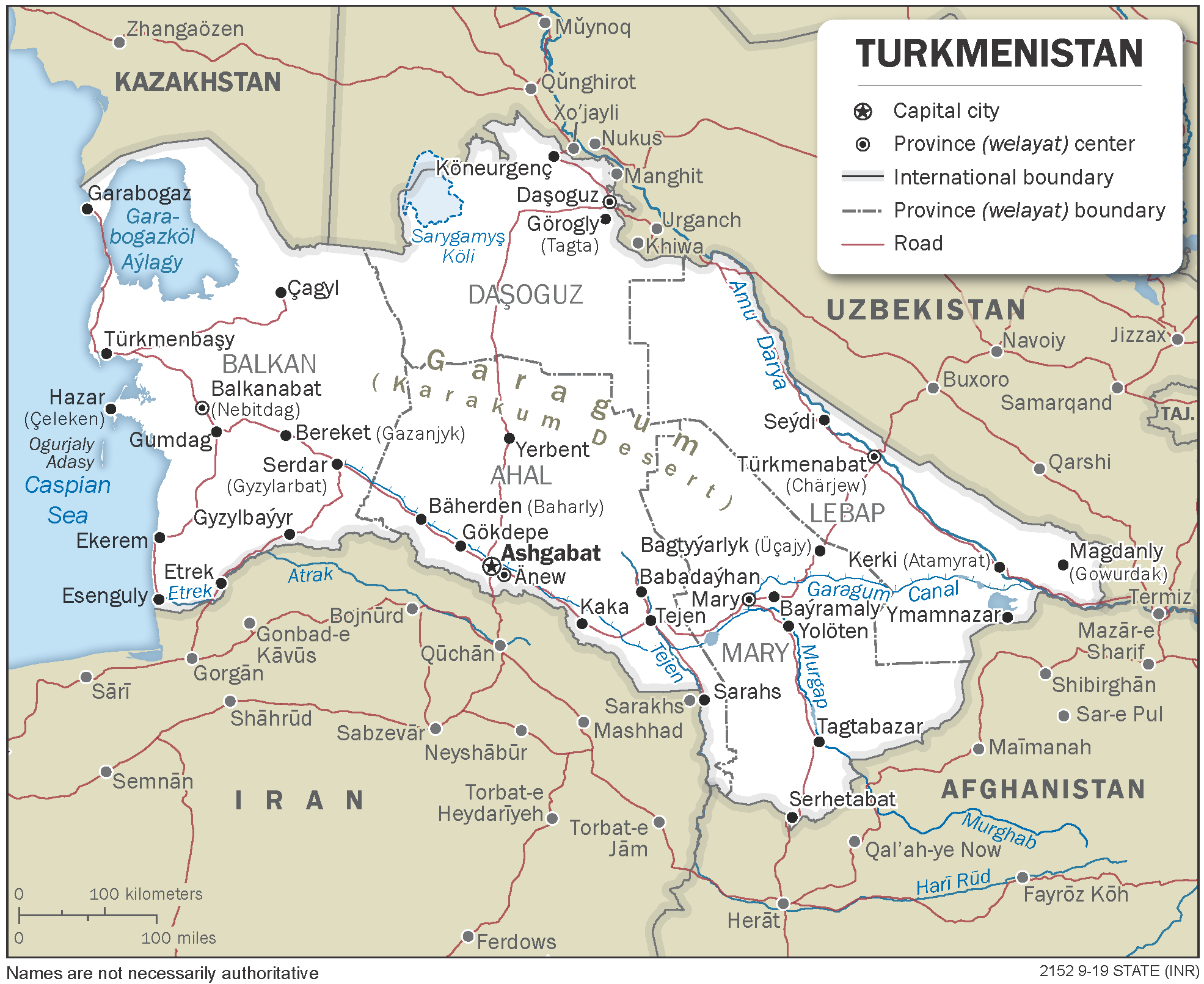
Map of Turkmenistan showing Turkmenbashi (Türkmenbaşy) seaport and Turkmenabat river port.

== Maritime ports and harbours ==
=== Caspian Sea ===
- Turkmenbashy International Seaport
  - Alaja Loading Terminal (oil)
  - Ekerem Loading Terminal (oil)
  - Kenar Loading Terminal (oil)
- Garabogaz Loading Terminal (urea)
- Gyýanly Loading Terminal (polymers)
- Port of Hazar (oil, operated by Dragon Oil)

=== Amu Darya ===
- Turkmenabat River Port

== See also ==
- Railways in Turkmenistan
- Transport in Turkmenistan
- Turkmenistan Airlines
