= Esenguly =

Esenguly Esenguly şäheri
- City
- Location in Turkmenistan Esenguly (Caspian Sea)
- Coordinates: 37°28′01″N 53°58′45″E
- Country: Turkmenistan
- Province: Balkan Province
- District: Esenguly District
- Elevation: −22 m (−72 ft)

Population (2022 official census)
  - Total: 12,918
- Time zone: UTC+05:00 (TMT)

Esenguly, formerly known as Hasan-Kuly, in Russian: Гасан-Кули, is a city in and administrative center of Esenguly District, Balkan Province, Turkmenistan. In 2022, it had a population of 12,918 people.

== Etymology ==
The name is of obscure origin. A clan of that name, part of the Yomud tribe, exists, but local elders have stated the name is of a long-dead person.

== Geography ==
Esenguly lies on a flat, barren plain, just off the coast of the Caspian Sea. The city lies at around 22 metres (72 ft) below mean sea level.

== Climate ==
Esenguly has a desert climate (Köppen climate classification BWk), with cool winters and hot summers. Temperatures are not as extreme as other parts of Turkmenistan due to the town's proximity to the Caspian Sea. Precipitation is low, but is highest in winter and lowest in summer.

Climate data for Esenguly (1991-2020, extremes 1926-present)
Month	Jan	Feb	Mar	Apr	May	Jun	Jul	Aug	Sep	Oct	Nov	Dec	Year
Record high °C (°F)	28.3 (82.9)	30.2 (86.4)	35.8 (96.4)	40.0 (104.0)	44.1 (111.4)	46.5 (115.7)	43.7 (110.7)	43.0 (109.4)	44.8 (112.6)	40.3 (104.5)	36.0 (96.8)	29.6 (85.3)	46.5 (115.7)
Mean daily maximum °C (°F)	11.6 (52.9)	12.5 (54.5)	16.0 (60.8)	20.8 (69.4)	25.9 (78.6)	29.4 (84.9)	31.3 (88.3)	32.1 (89.8)	29.5 (85.1)	24.7 (76.5)	17.8 (64.0)	13.0 (55.4)	22.1 (71.7)
Daily mean °C (°F)	6.1 (43.0)	7.1 (44.8)	10.8 (51.4)	15.6 (60.1)	21.2 (70.2)	25.6 (78.1)	28.1 (82.6)	28.7 (83.7)	25.1 (77.2)	18.9 (66.0)	12.1 (53.8)	7.6 (45.7)	17.2 (63.1)
Mean daily minimum °C (°F)	1.8 (35.2)	2.8 (37.0)	6.4 (43.5)	11.3 (52.3)	17.0 (62.6)	21.8 (71.2)	25.3 (77.5)	25.2 (77.4)	20.6 (69.1)	13.6 (56.5)	7.4 (45.3)	3.4 (38.1)	13.1 (55.5)
Record low °C (°F)	−17.9 (−0.2)	−13.0 (8.6)	−9.1 (15.6)	−1.2 (29.8)	1.4 (34.5)	9.2 (48.6)	12.8 (55.0)	13.3 (55.9)	3.7 (38.7)	−1.8 (28.8)	−9.7 (14.5)	−16.4 (2.5)	−17.9 (−0.2)
Average precipitation mm (inches)	20 (0.8)	21 (0.8)	25 (1.0)	16 (0.6)	6 (0.2)	5 (0.2)	5 (0.2)	9 (0.4)	8 (0.3)	22 (0.9)	32 (1.3)	21 (0.8)	190 (7.5)
Average precipitation days	5.1	5.0	4.4	3.5	1.0	0.9	0.8	1.1	1.2	2.7	5.0	5.7	36.4
Average relative humidity (%)	79.6	77.1	74.0	72.0	69.2	68.5	69.9	69.1	65.8	68.0	74.6	80.8	72.4
Mean monthly sunshine hours	154.1	157.8	166.6	204.8	269.9	315.8	311.5	294.5	249.1	220.8	181.9	151.3	2,678.1
Source 1: Pogoda.ru.net, climatebase.ru (precipitation days)
Source 2: NOAA (sun only, 1961-1990)

== Transportation ==
A road leads north to Çekişler and Ekerem. Route P-16 connects these towns to Gumdag. Another road to the east connects the town to Ajiyap, Çaloýuk, Garadegiş and Akyayla, from which route P-15 leads to Etrek and Magtymguly, and also to Gyzylarbat.
