= Garagöl =

Village in Turkmenistan

Garagöl Garagöl obasy
- Village
- Location in Turkmenistan
- Coordinates: 39°22′49″N 53°10′20″E
- Country: Turkmenistan
- Province: Balkan Province
- District: Balkanabat
- Town: Hazar

Population (2022 official census)
  - Total: 765
- Time zone: UTC+5

Garagöl is a coastal village in Balkan Province, Turkmenistan. It is subordinate to Hazar, which is subordinate to Balkanabat, a city with district status. In 2022, it had population of 765 people.

== Etymology ==
In Turkmen, Garagöl is a compound of two words: "Gara" and "Göl," which mean "Black" and "Lake" respectively.

== History ==
On November 9, 2022, Garagöl was downgraded from its township to village status.

== Economy ==
The village is located southeast of Hazar. Eastward, next to the village, lies an oil terminal directly linked to a pumping station up north. A road linking Hazar to Alaja terminal passes just west of Garagöl.

== Subordination ==
Garagöl is the only rural village subordinate to Hazar.

== See also ==
- List of municipalities in Balkan Province
