= Garadepe =

Garadepe Garadepe şäherçesi
- Town
- Location in Turkmenistan
- Coordinates: 38°01′57″N 54°02′01″E
- Country: Turkmenistan
- Province: Balkan Province
- District: Esenguly District

Population (2022 official census)
  - Total: 9,016
- Time zone: UTC+5

Garadepe, previously known as Karadepe (in Russian: Карадепе), is a town in Balkan Province, Turkmenistan. 15 km east of Ekerem, an important oil terminal of the Caspian sea, the town is primarily dependent on the oil industry. In 2022, it had a population of 9,016, making it the 2nd most populated place in Esenguly District.

== Etymology ==
In Turkmen, Garadepe is a compound of two words: "Gara" and "Depe," which translate to "Black" and "Hill" respectively.

== Overview ==
Although being the second most populated settlement in Esenguly District, the town is very dependent on Ekerem, 15 km away, in many different sectors of activity. In 2012, a large sporting complex opened in Ekerem; yet, a certain number of people frequenting the place were from Garadepe, highlighting a lack of infrastructure.

== History ==
The settlement is granted a "city-like" status on 23 August 1990 by the Supreme Soviet of the Turkmen SSR.

== See also ==
- Towns of Turkmenistan
- List of municipalities in Balkan Province
