= Boyadag Mud Volcano =

Mud volcano in Balkan Province, Turkmenistan

Coordinates: 39.12500°N 54.65000°E

Boyadag Mud Volcano is a mud volcano along the western boundary of the eponymous anticline in Balkan Province, Turkmenistan. The nearest town is Gumdag.
