= Jebel Ali (disambiguation) =

Jebel Ali is a municipality in the emirate of Dubai within the United Arab Emirates.

Jebel Ali may also refer to:

- Jebel Ali International Airport or Al Maktoum International Airport
- Jebel Ali Seaplane Base
- UAE Exchange (Dubai Metro) or Jebel Ali station

== See also ==
- Jebel Ali Free Zone
- Jebel Ali refinery
- Port of Jebel Ali
