= Cheleken (disambiguation) =

Cheleken or Çeleken may refer to:

- Cheleken Peninsula
- Hazar, Turkmenistan
- Cheleken oilfield
- RV Cheleken, a 861 Project hydrographic survey ship of the Soviet Hydrographic Service
