= Geology of Turkmenistan =

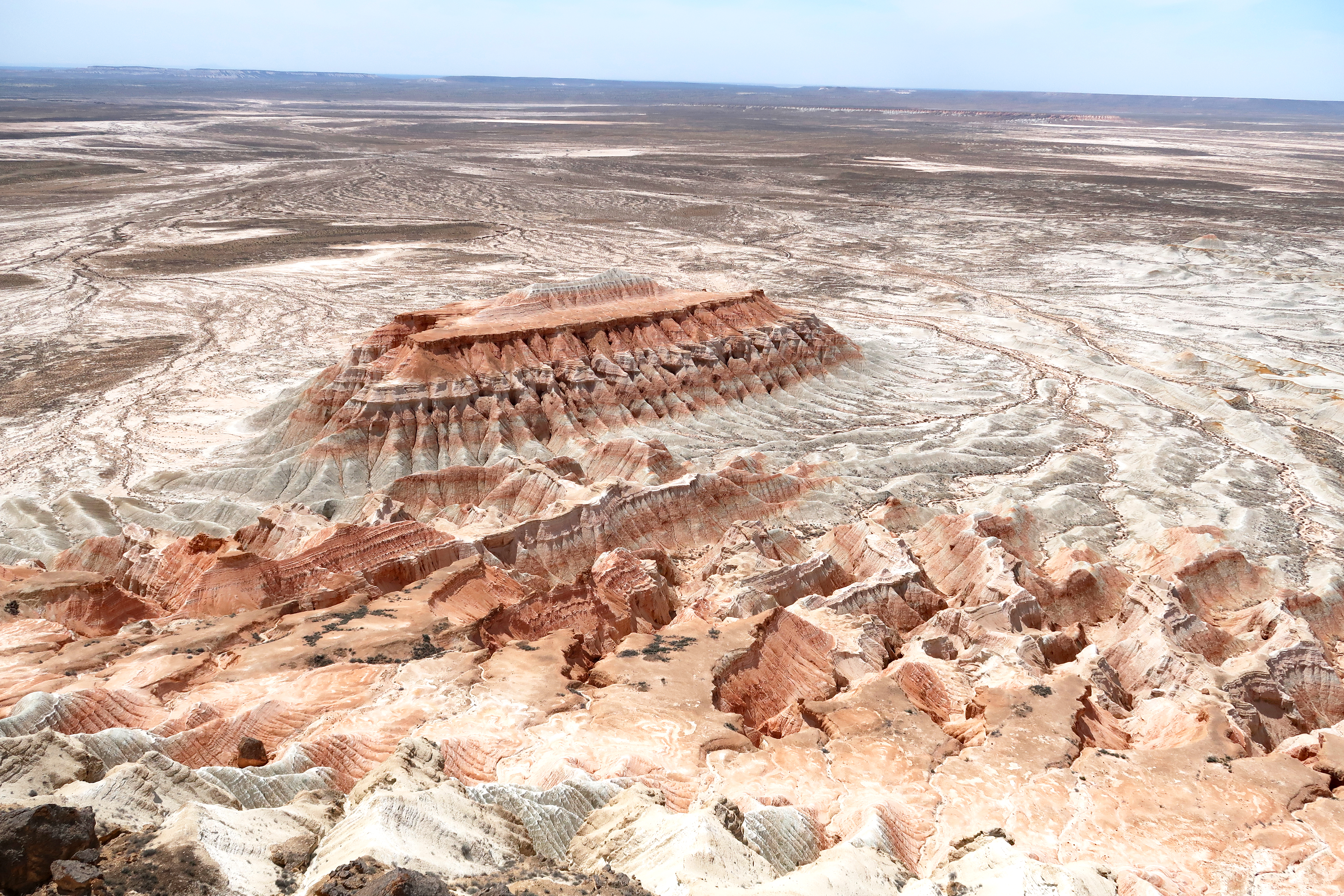
Rocks at Yangykala Canyon

The geology of Turkmenistan includes two different geological provinces: the Karakum, or South Turan Platform, and the Alpine Orogen.

== Geologic history, stratigraphy and tectonics ==
Basement rock is only exposed at the surface in three places on the Turkmenistan plain. Shale with lenses of spilite, jasper-like rocks and silicified limestone outcrops in the center of the Tuarkyr elevation. Together with gabbro, serpentinized pyroxenite and diabase and numerous radiolarian fossils, they form an ophiolite mélange from the Paleozoic, overlain by four kilometers of sandstone, clay, tuff and conglomerate.

Late Paleozoic igneous rocks are exposed on the Krasnovodsk Peninsula, including granite, gabbro and acid volcanic rocks dating to 450 to 350 million years ago. The third exposure is on the left bank of the Amudarriya River, where 285 to 280 million year old cataclastic granite intrudes Devonian clay and carbonate sediments.

Precambrian schist, amphibolite and gneiss, Middle Paleozoic granite, gabbroid, metamorphosed volcano-sedimentary rocks and Late Paleozoic intrusives are known through drillholes in the South Turan Platform. Geologists divide the platform basement into Precambrian massif and fold zones related to the Hercynian orogeny.

=== Mesozoic (251–66 million years ago) ===
Sedimentary rocks formed during the Jurassic, Cretaceous and Cenozoic overlie the South Turan Platform. In the Murgab depression and Cis-Kopetdag, they reach up to eight to 10 kilometers thick, although average thickness is one to two kilometers. Turkmenistan has tectonically complex uplands, often separated by shallow deeps.

Rhaetic and Liassic age Alpine cover rocks on the South Turan Platform lies unconformably atop folded basement rocks. These are mainly sand and clay layers deposited in a nearshore environment, often with coal layers. Late Jurassic deposits include a 60-meter clay and marl unit, an 800-meter carbonaceous unit and an upper 1.2-kilometer salt-bearing sequence. Jurassic sediments are up to three kilometers thick in the South Turkmenistan subsidence system.

=== Cenozoic (66 million years ago–present) ===
In the Paleocene and the Eocene, the North Mesotethys Ocean closed, forming the Shachrud-Nishapoor thrust-folded arc and the Eastern Iran transverse folded system. This led to the incorporation of Turkmenistan, Iran and Afghanistan into the larger Eurasian Plate. As Gondwana moved northward and interacted with Eurasia in the Paleogene, subduction began south of the current Zagros Mountains in northern Iraq and Iran. As the North Mesotethys Ocean basin was subducted, it kicked off calc-alkaline volcanism in Iran in the Eocene. The Badkhys volcanic rocks and Great Balkhan bentonites on the Turan Plate in Turkmenistan are remnants of the inland extent of this subduction and volcanism.

The collisions uplifted a large area across Eurasia as the Alpine-Asiatic mobile belt. Regionally, this uplift resulted in the Turkmen-Khorasan and Afghan-Tien Shan folded regions. The Southern Turkmen sutural zone, a linear area with wrench-dislocations is forming in the southwest along the Turkmen-Khorasan fold system. Throughout the Miocene deep troughs filled with molasse deposits two kilometers to as much as eight kilometers thick (in the case of the West Turkmenian Basin). During the Pliocene and Quaternary, the level of the Caspian Sea has varied widely. In fact the level of the Caspian basins dropped up to 500 meters. This has tended to deep paleo-valleys as downcutting took place.

Turkmenistan is highly seismically active, especially around the Kopetdag-Balkhan deep fault zone.

== Natural resource geology ==
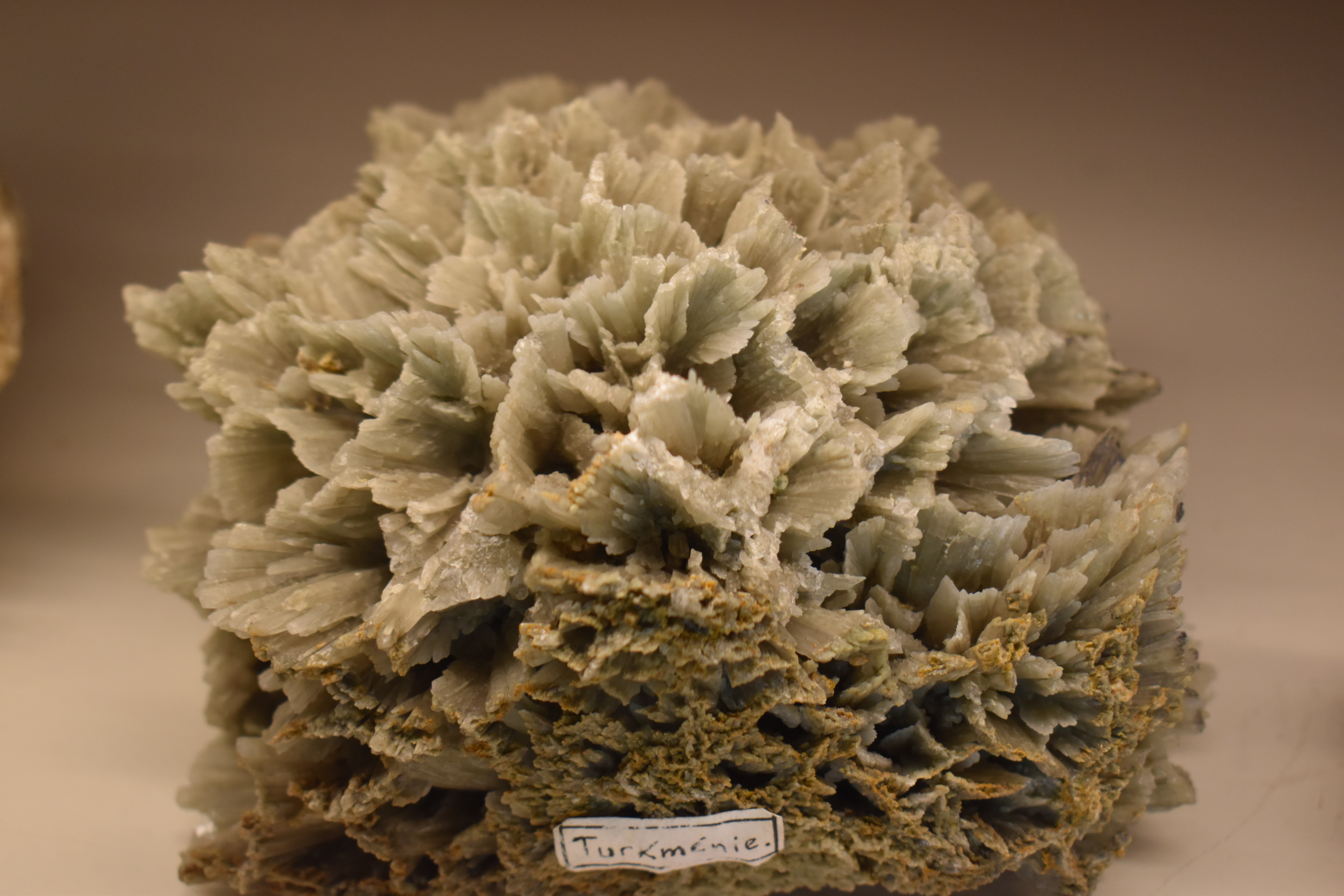
Celestine crystals from Turkmenistan

Oil and gas are the dominant natural resources in Turkmenistan, with over 50 deposits discovered before the end of the 20th century. The West Turkmen Depression, also known as the Transcaspian Depression, is the main oil-producing area primarily from Pliocene rocks. Intensive oil extraction began in the 1940s, reaching 16 million tons by 1973. After Russia, the US and Canada, Turkmenistan is the fourth largest natural gas producer in the world. Most gas reserves are held in structural traps in Jurassic, Cretaceous and Paleocene rocks in the East Turkmenistan Turan Platform, at depths of 1.5 to five kilometers, within uplifts of the Turkmen Anteclise and Amudarija Syneclise. The Murgab Depression is the single most productive area for gas, with the massive 1.8 trillion-cubic-meter Dauletabad-Donmez gas field and 300 billion-cubic-meter Naip field.

In addition to gas deposits, Turkmenistan has the largest bromine and iodine reserves in the world as well as Karabogasgol Bay with large reserves of mirabilite and sodium sulfate. The eastern region of Guardak-Kugitang has abundant potassium salt, halite and sulfur, while the Oglanly deposit in Great Balkhan in Eocene sediments is a major supply of bentonite. Keramsite and other material is mined for construction.

== Hydrogeology ==
Oases supply the cities of Cis-Kopetdag and Tedzhen-Murgab with drinking water and groundwater is widely extracted for use in the arid oil fields, particularly the Yaschan freshwater aquifer at Uzboy. Turkmenistan has mineral water springs at Archman, Ashkhabad and Bayram-Ali.
