= Esenguly District =

Coordinates: 37.4667°N 53.9667°E

Esenguly District Esenguly etraby
- District
- Interactive map of Esenguly District
- Country: Turkmenistan
- Province: Balkan Province
- Capital: Esenguly

Area
  - Total: 9,801 km^{2} (3,784 sq mi)

Population (2022 census)
  - Total: 45,436
  - Density: 4.636/km^{2} (12.01/sq mi)
- Time zone: UTC+5

Esenguly District is a district of Balkan Province in Turkmenistan. The administrative center of the district is the town of Esenguly

== Awards ==
Esenguly District won the award of "best district" in the country for 2018, along with $1 million in prize money.

== Administrative Subdivisions ==
- Cities (şäherler)
  - Esenguly
- Towns (şäherçeler)
  - Ekerem (inc. Gamyşlyja)
  - Garadepe
- Village councils (geňeşlikler)
  - Ajyýap (Ajyýap)
  - Bugdaýly (Bugdaýly, Alaňňyrtly, Balguýy, Gögerendag, Orunçäge, Şahman, Yňdarlan)
  - Çaloýyk (Çaloýyk)
  - Çekişler (Çekişler, Bazarly)
  - Garadegiş (Garadegiş)
