= Balkan Region =

Region of Turkmenistan

Balkan Balkan welaýat
- Region
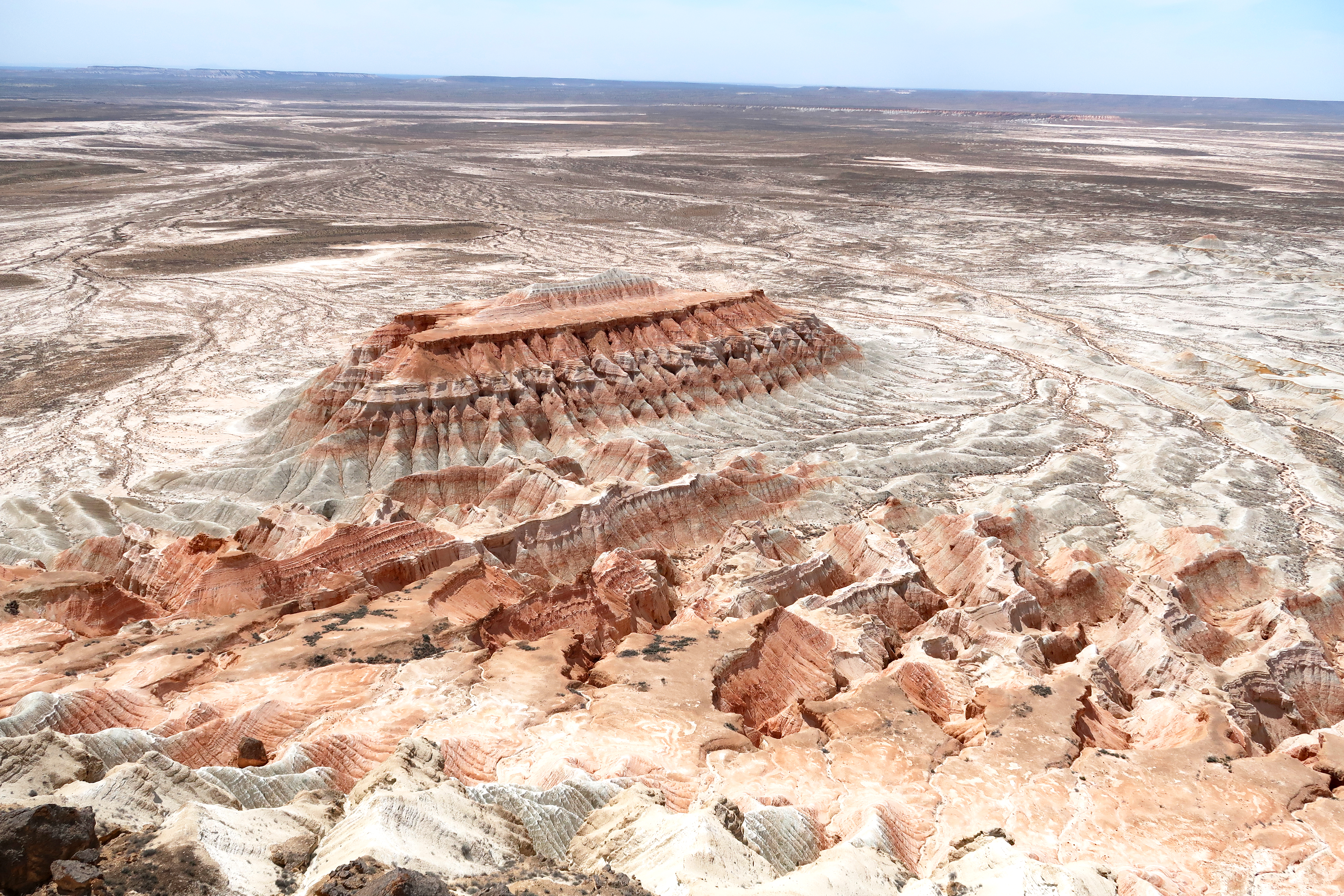
- From the top, Yangykala Canyon, Entrance to Türkmenbaşy, Discoverers Monument in Balkanabat

- Balkan region in Turkmenistan
- Coordinates: 40°0′N 55°0′E
- Country: Turkmenistan
- Capital: Balkanabat

Area
  - Total: 139,270 km^{2} (53,770 sq mi)

Population (2022 census)
  - Total: 529,895
  - Density: 3.8048/km^{2} (9.8544/sq mi)
- Website: balkan.gov.tm

Balkan Region (Turkmen: Balkan welaýaty, Балкан велаяты) is the westernmost of the five regions of Turkmenistan. Clockwise from north it borders Kazakhstan, Uzbekistan (north); two provinces of Turkmenistan (east), Iran (south), and the Caspian Sea (west). The capital city is Balkanabat, formerly known as Nebit Dag.

The region's boundaries are identical to those of the former Krasnovodsk Oblast, a Soviet-era province of the Turkmen Soviet Socialist Republic with its capital in the city of Krasnovodsk. This oblast was liquidated and restored repeatedly in the 20th century, concluding with its abolition in 1988. However, the administrative boundaries of the region were restored in 1991 when Balkan Region was established with its capital being moved to Nebit Dag which was later renamed Balkanabat.

The province covers 139,270 square kilometers and counts 529,895 residents (2022 estimate). A large minority of these are nomadic herding families. Its population density of 3.8 persons per square kilometer is the lowest in Turkmenistan.

Other cities include: Bereket, Türkmenbaşy, Gumdag, Gyzylarbat, Hazar, Etrek, and Esenguly.

Balkan Region has significant hydrocarbon reserves, which in 2019 accounted for 13.9% of Turkmenistan's natural gas production and 93.1% of its petroleum production. It also generated 15.4% of the country's electric power. Due to the very low water supply, agriculture is negligible, and only 4.5% of Turkmenistan's arable lands are within the province.

Off its Caspian shores, the Balkan Region includes the island of Ogurja Ada, the largest in the Caspian Sea.

== History ==
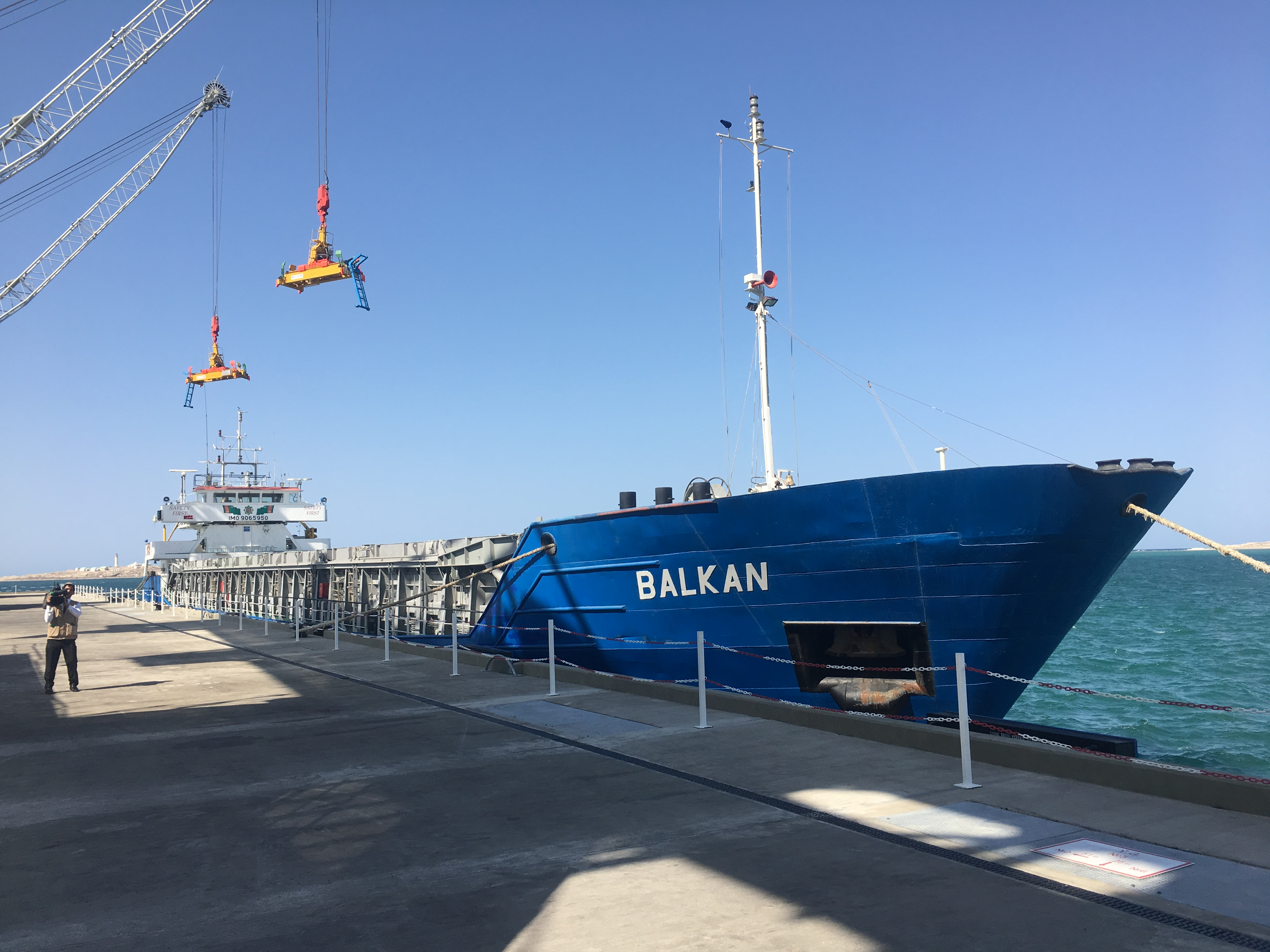
Loading terminal of the Garabogaz urea (carbamide) plant in Balkan Province, Turkmenistan

It seems that in the plain between the two ranges of the Balkan Mountains there was a small settlement area and an old town called Balkhan. The exact location of this town is not known. According to Yakut, the city of Balkhan was situated along the old road near Amu Darya, in the Balkan region, east of the Gulf of Krasnovodsk, and close to the small town of Khwarezm, which later became known as Abivard. Muqaddasi mentions a ruined town called Balkhan, saying it had been destroyed, and notes that people of Nisa and Abivard would go there in search of pasture for their cattle and for commerce. Abu al-Ghazi Bahadur also refers to this mountain under the name Balkhan. Barthold believed that the name Balkhan derives from the Persian word bālākhāna (upper house).

The Balkan Mountains apparently served as a refuge for the ancient tribes of Baitak and Mavarannahr. In 416/1025, Mahmud of Ghazni gave the Turkmens of north of Jeyhun (Amu Darya) permission to settle to the south of this river. Some of them spread in Abivard, Serakhs, and Nisa, while others spread out over the plains of Balkhan. These Turkmens, in their new settlement, soon engaged in looting and destruction. In the north of Nishapur, a severe battle took place. During this battle, about forty thousand Turkmens were killed, and the survivors fled to “the Balkhan mountains.”

In the 6th/12th century, the Salor Turkmen tribe, including the branches of Teke, Saryk, and Sarik, settled in the Balkhan region and along the shores of the Uzboy river. In the 8th/14th century, the Yomut Turkmens also spread to this area and occupied parts of the Balkhan Gulf. In the 10th/16th century, under Shah Tahmasp I (1524–1576), the presence of Yomut groups in the Balkan Mountains was reported.

From 1811/1226 until 1881/1298, the road from Turkestan to the Qizil Arvat region passed through the Balkhan Mountains. During the years 1885–1888, the Russians also traveled this route. From that time, the Balkhan Gulf became one of the main centers of Russian commerce. After the construction of the Trans-Caspian railway, the Balkhan Gulf (today’s port of Türkmenbaşy) was connected to Europe via Uzboy and Tashkent.

== Demographic ==
=== Table of National composition of the population of Balkan region (2022) ===
Table:

Ethnicity	Total		Urban		Rural		
Ethnicity	Population	%	Population	%	Population	%	
Ethnicity	Turkmens	496,541	93.71%	402,307	92.47%	94,234	99.40%
Russians	14,412	2.72%	14,356	3.30%	56	0.06%	
Azerbaijanis	7,389	1.40%	7,332	1.69%	57	0.06%	
Uzbeks	2,895	0.55%	2,721	0.63%	174	0.19%	
Kazakhs	2,663	0.50%	2,484	0.57%	179	0.19%	
Armenians	2,150	0.41%	2,149	0.49%	1	0.00%	
Lezgins	1,479	0.28%	1,477	0.34%	2	0.00%	
Tatars	1,127	0.21%	1,123	0.26%	4	0.01%	
Balochi	338	0.06%	262	0.06%	76	0.08%	
Ukrainians	306	0.06%	306	0.07%	–	–	
Persians	38	0.01%	30	0.01%	8	0.01%	
Kurds	21	0.00%	19	0.00%	2	0.00%	
Karakalpaks	19	0.00%	15	0.00%	4	0.00%	
Afghans	15	0.00%	11	0.00%	4	0.00%	
Koreans	13	0.00%	13	0.00%	–	–	
other nationalities	489	0.09%	485	0.11%	4	0.00%	
Total	529,925	100%	435,120	100%	94,805	100%	

== Administrative subdivisions ==
=== Districts ===
Balkan Province (Balkan welaýaty) is subdivided into 6 districts (etrap, plural etraplar):

1. Bereket (previously Gazanjyk)
2. Esenguly (previously Hasan-Kuli)
3. Etrek (previously Gyzyletrek)
4. Gyzylarbat (from 1999 to 2022 called Serdar)
5. Magtymguly (previously Garry Gala)
6. Türkmenbaşy

In addition, part of the city of Turkmenbashy is subdivided into a borough with district status and thus a presidentially appointed mayor.

- City Boroughs of Türkmenbaşy City:
1. Awaza etraby

The former Kenar Borough (Kenar etraby) of the city of Turkmenbashy was abolished effective 9 November 2022.

=== Municipalities ===
As of January 1, 2017, the province included 10 cities (города or şäherler), 13 towns (посёлки or şäherçeler), 33 rural or village councils (сельские советы or geňeşlikler), and 112 villages (села, сельские населенные пункты or obalar). Two cities, Gumdag and Hazar, were downgraded to town status in November 2022, reducing the number of cities to eight and increasing the number of towns by two. The town of Garagöl was annexed by the town of Hazar, bringing the number of towns to 14.

In the list below, cities with "district status" are bolded:

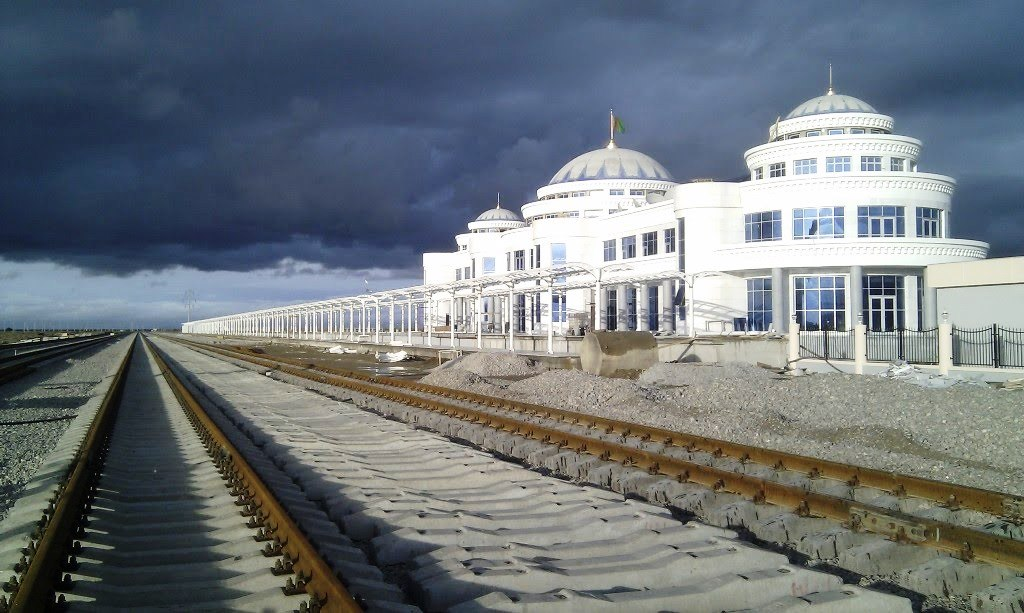
Railway station in Bereket city, October 2013.

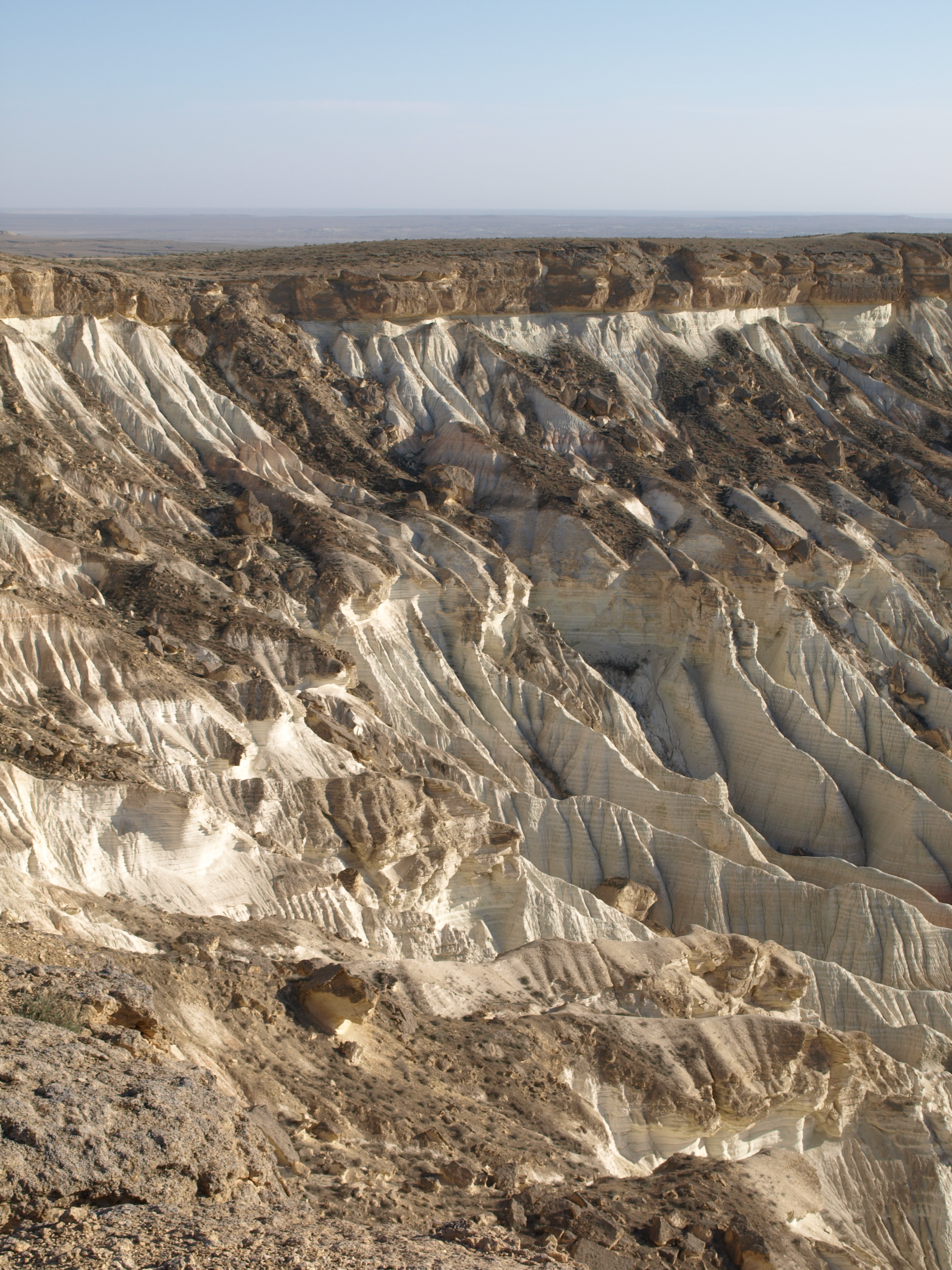
Wall of Yangy Kala Canyon in Balkan Province, Turkmenistan

- **Balkanabat** (formerly Nebit-Dag)
- Bereket (formerly Gazanjyk (Cyrillic Russian: Казанджик or Газанджык))
- Esenguly (formerly Hasan Kuli) (Cyrillic Russian: Гасан-Кули)
- Etrek (formerly Gyzyletrek)
- Garabogaz (formerly Bekdaş)
- Gyzylarbat (from 1999 to 2022 called Serdar)
- Magtymguly (formerly Garrygala) (Cyrillic Russian: Кара Кала)
- **Türkmenbaşy City** (formerly Krasnovodsk)

== Industry ==
From 2017 to 2019, Balkan Province produced these volumes of industrial products:

	2017	2018	2019
Electricity million kwh	5,106.3	4,757.6	3,474.3
Oil (including gas condensate) thousand tonnes	10,237.9	10,120.9	9,146.4
Natural gas billion m^{3}	10.5	10.5	9.7
Gasoline thousand tonnes	1,828.1	1,830.1	1,707.6
Kerosene thousand tonnes	551.6	567.9	477.4
Diesel fuel thousand tonnes	1,897	1,182	1,745
Bunker oil thousand tonnes	623	854.5	674
Sodium sulfate thousand tonnes	3.1	1.5	0.3
Cement thousand tonnes	888.2	731.2	402.6
Building bricks million	6.2	6.8	9.7
Salt thousand tonnes	94.1	94.2	94.3

Turkmenistan's largest petroleum refinery is in the city of Turkmenbashy (viz.).

The Balkan Cement Plant in Jebel was built in 2011 by Turkish firm Polimeks and has a design capacity of one million tons per year.

The Kiyanly Polymer Factory (Turkmen: Gyýanly Polimer Zawody), inaugurated October 17, 2018, features design capacity to produce 381 thousand tonnes of polyethylene and 81 thousand tonnes of polypropylene per year. Built at a cost of $3.4 billion by LG International, Hyundai Engineering, Toyo Engineering, and Gap Inşaat (a subsidiary of Çalık Holding), the plant cracks methane and ethane for production of polymers. In the first ten months of 2019, however, the factory produced only 67,900 tonnes of polyethylene and 12,700 tonnes of polypropylene.

The $1.3 billion Garabogaz urea (carbamide) plant, built by Mitsubishi Heavy Industries and GAP İnşaat, was inaugurated on September 18, 2018, with a design capacity of 1.16 million tonnes of urea per year. Between January and October 2019, the Garabogaz plant produced approximately 392,000 tonnes of urea, of which 261,000 tonnes was exported.

Three factories produce iodine in Turkmenistan, all in Balkan Province: one each in Balkanabat, Hazar, and Bereket. The Bereket plant is designed to produce 150 tonnes per year of iodine. Following planned renovations and upgrades, the Balkanabat and Hazar plants will have design capacities of 250 tonnes and 300 tonnes of iodine, respectively, plus 2400 tonnes and 4500 tonnes of bromine, respectively, per year. Total production of iodine in 2019 was 681.4 tonnes.

== Transportation ==
The M37 highway begins at the Turkmenbashi International Seaport and leads eastward 1200 kilometers in the direction of Ashgabat, Mary, Türkmenabat, and the border with Uzbekistan. A network of paved roads connects major population centers, including the P-15, P-16, P-17, P-18, and P-20 highways. Passenger and car ferry service is available between the seaport in Turkmenbashy and Baku. A major airport is located in Turkmenbashy, and smaller airports are located in Balkanabat, Etrek, Garabogaz, Hazar, and Jebel. A military airfield is located at Ýangyja.

The Trans-Caspian Railway begins in Turkmenbashy and extends eastward to Uzbekistan via Ashgabat, Mary, and Turkmenabat. The International North–South Transport Corridor passes through Balkan Province and intersects the Trans-Caspian Railway at Bereket, which features a large locomotive depot and repair works.

In addition to the seaport at Turkmenbashy, smaller vessel-loading facilities are found at Garabogaz (urea) and Gyýanly (polymers). Turkmenbashy International Seaport operates oil-loading terminals at Alaja, Ekerem, and Kenar, and Dragon Oil loads oil at the port of Hazar.

== See also ==
- Balkan newspaper
- Cave of Dzhebel
- Gyzylbaýyr
- Hojagala
- Jebel
- Ogurja Ada
- Türkmenbaşy Gulf
- Türkmenbaşy şäherçesi

== Links ==
- Tourism in Balkan Province
