= Jebel Ali refinery =

Oil refinery in the UAE

Coordinates: 25.01844°N 55.14305°E

The Jebel Ali refinery was constructed from 1996 to 1999. It is located in Dubai and operated by the Emirates National Oil Co. (ENOC), which is owned by the Government of Dubai. It is a 120 kbpd gas condensate refinery, and processes mainly condensate or light crude oil. These inputs are processed to various products, including LPG, naphtha, jet fuel, diesel fuel and fuel oil. The plant consists of two 60 kbit/s condensate distillation units (often referred to as condensate splitters) and five merox sweetening units.

An upgrade - costing $850 million (US) - was implemented in 2010 for the production of reformat and low-sulfur naphtha through installation of a reformer and a hydrotreater. In 2014, a contract for a new upgrade project was awarded to KBR. The upgrade will lead to the production of Euro V grade products.

== See also ==
- Oil refinery
- Petroleum
- List of oil refineries
