= Yangykala Canyon =

Landform in Turkmenistan

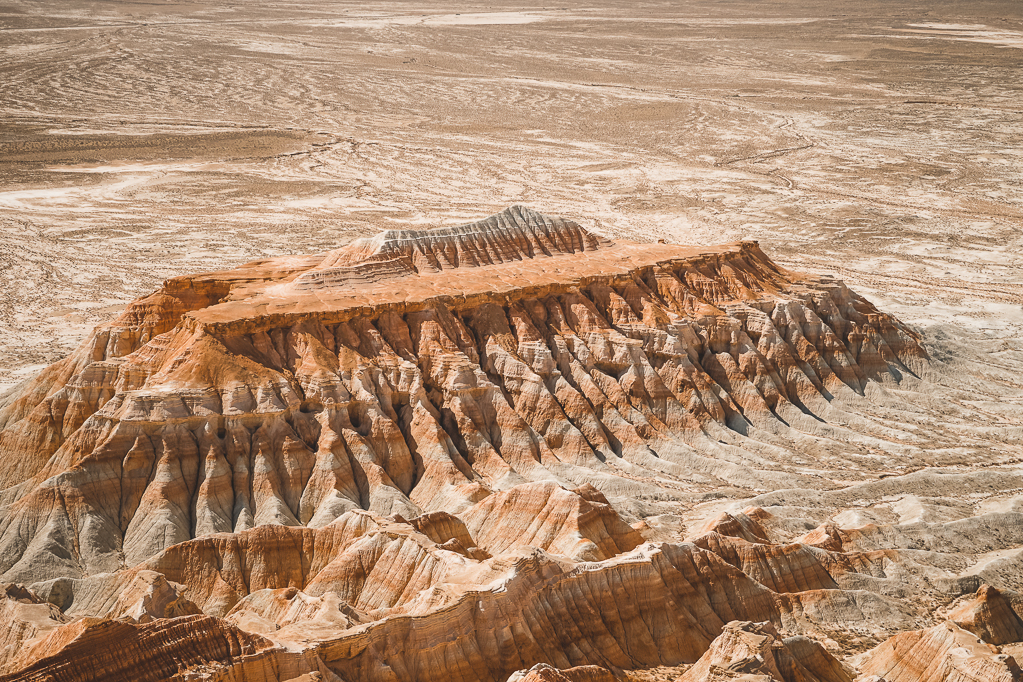
- Yangykala Canyon

Geography
- Location: Turkmenistan
- Coordinates: 40°37′56″N 54°55′36″E
- Interactive map of Yangykala Canyon

Yangykala Canyon (Translated from the Turkmen language, Yangykala means "Fiery Fortresses") is an eponymous landform in the Balkan Region of north-west Turkmenistan, about 160 km east of Turkmenbashi and 165 km north of Balkanabat. The bottom of the canyon was once flooded by the Garabogazköl.

The canyon's rocks are predominantly red, leading locals to call it "Gyzyl Dag" (Red Mountains). The canyon's cliffs reach heights of 60 to 100 meters.

== Tourism ==
The canyon has become a popular tourist attraction in Turkmenistan. The Yangykala Canyon attracts numerous tourists, especially during the summer period. The place is suitable for hiking and camping, as well as for jeep safaris.

== Gallery ==
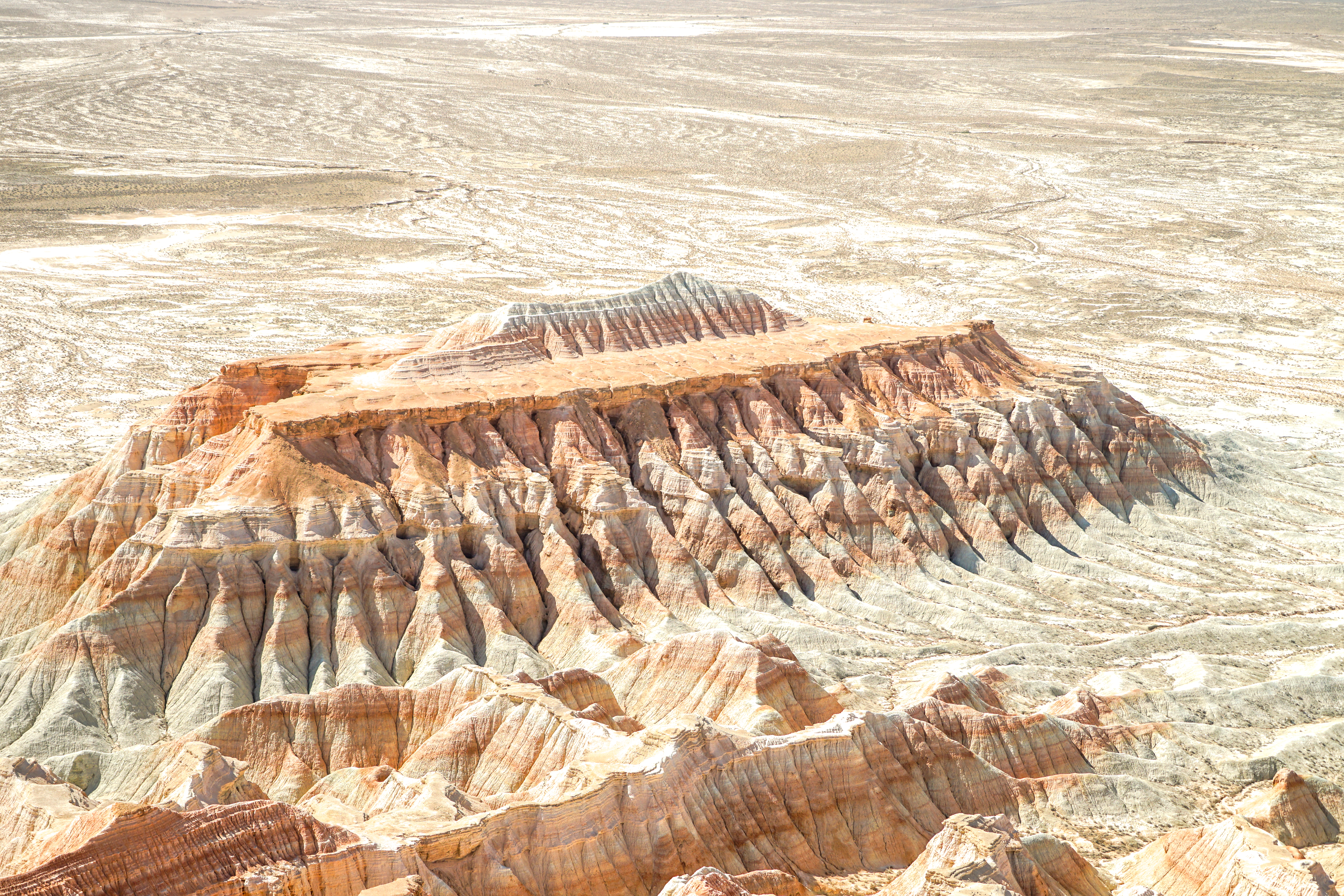

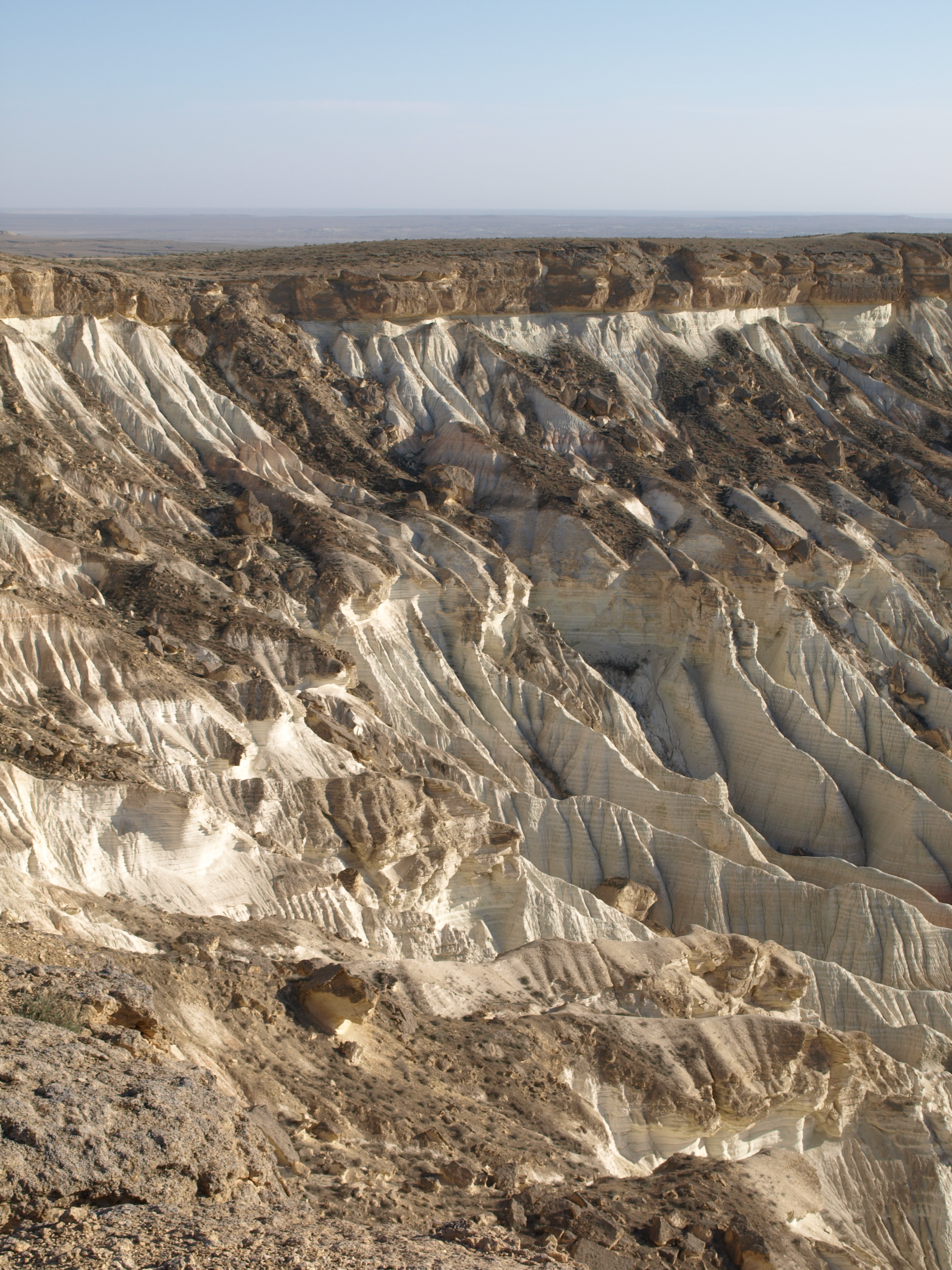

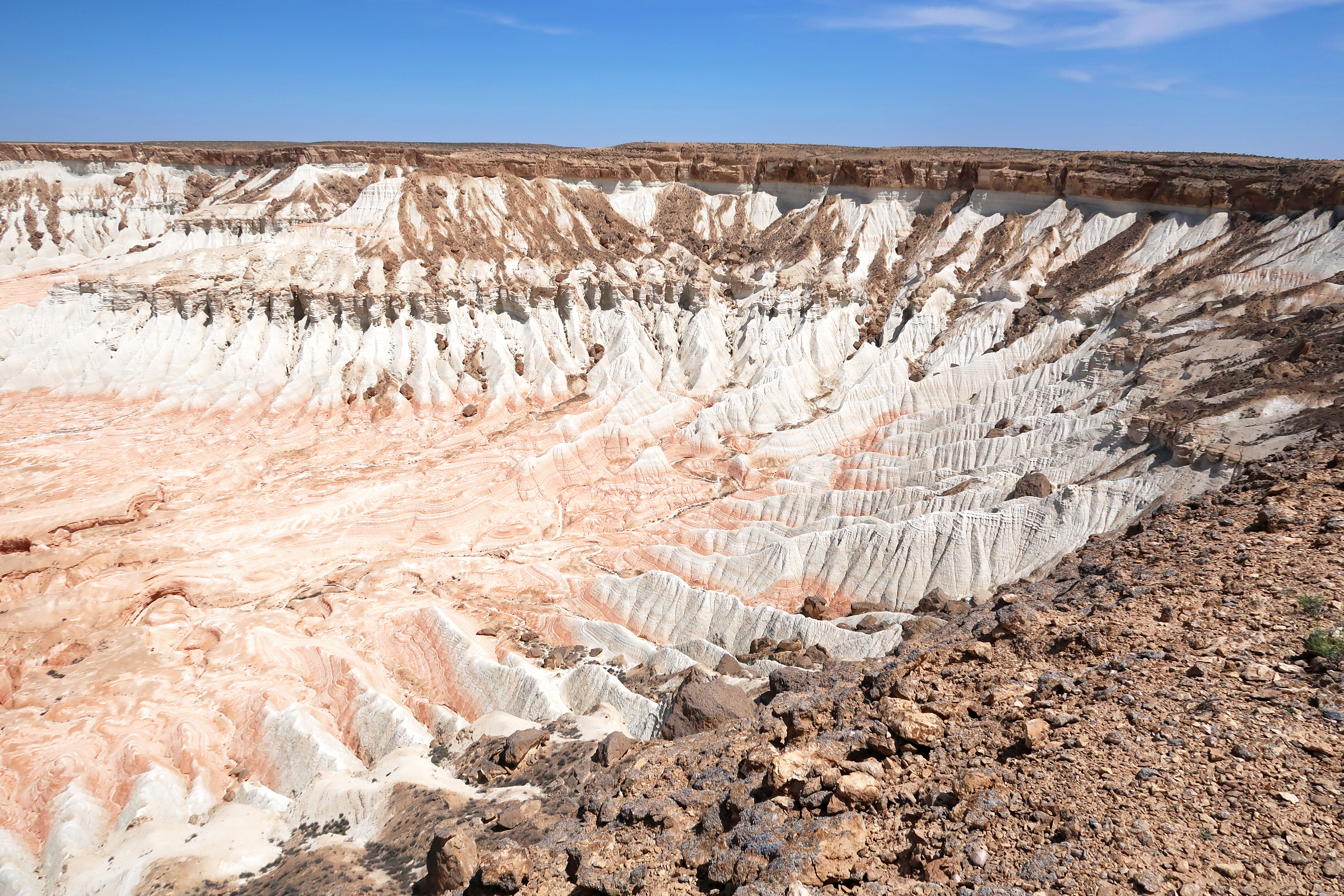

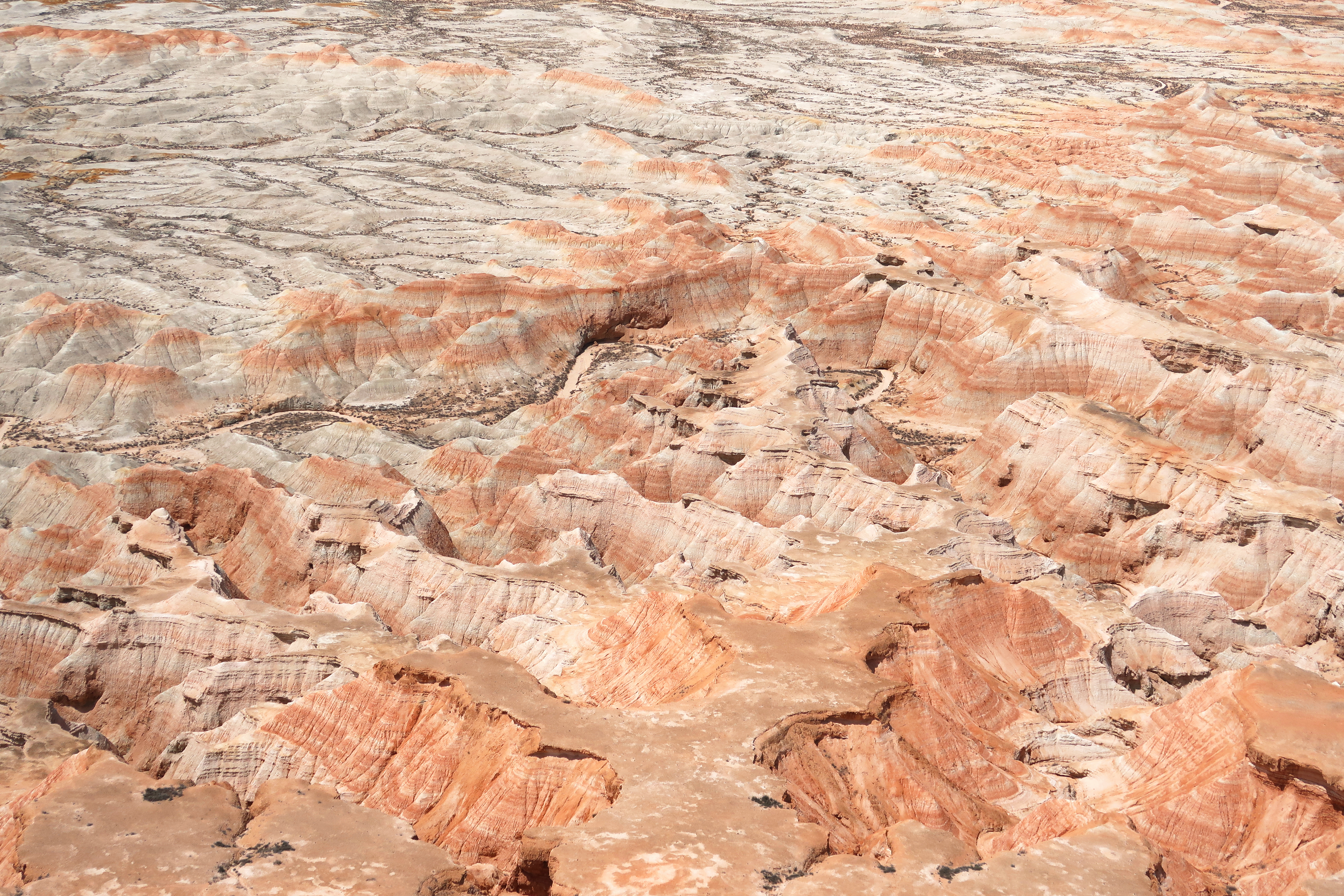

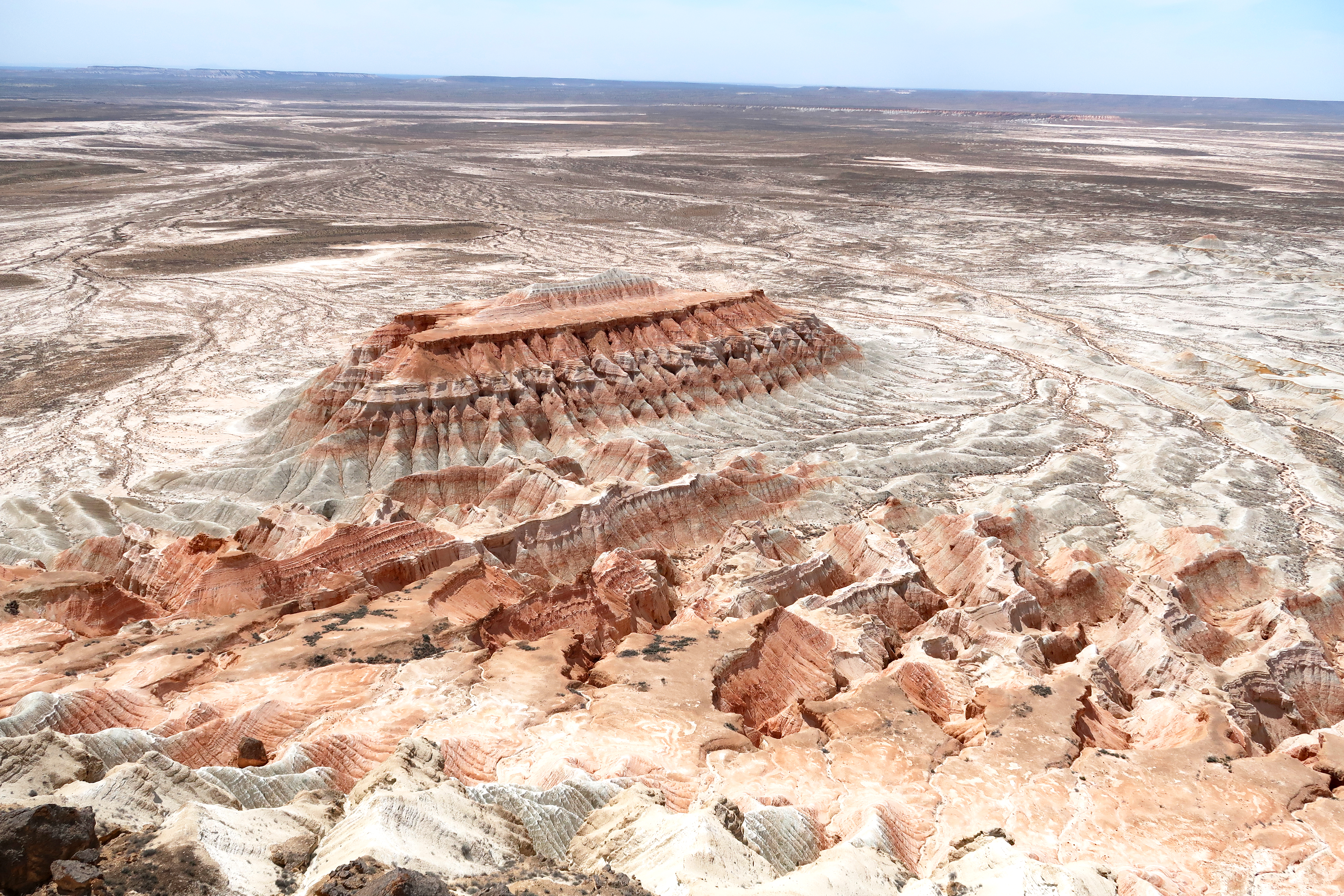

== See also ==
- Grand Canyon, USA
- Providence Canyon, USA
- Copper Canyon, Mexico
- Ustyurt Plateau, Kazakhstan
