= Emirates National Oil Company =

Government-owned energy corporation based in Dubai, UAE

Emirates National Oil Company (ENOC) شركة بترول الإمارات الوطنية
- Company type: Government-owned corporation
- Founded: 1993; 33 years ago
- Headquarters: Dubai, United Arab Emirates
- Key people: Saeed Mohammed Ahmad Al Tayer (Chairman); Abdulrahman Saleh Al Saleh (Vice Chairman)
- Owner: Investment Corporation of Dubai
- Number of employees: 9,000+
- Website: www.enoc.com

ENOC (the Emirates National Oil Company) is a global diversified state-owned energy group that operates in the oil, gas, and coal industry.

== History ==
Established in 1993, ENOC is a wholly-owned company of the Government of Dubai, through the Investment Corporation of Dubai. In 1999, ENOC opened its first oil refinery, which produced 120,000 barrels per day (19,000 m^{3}/d) and cost about DH 1.5 billion.

In 2019, ENOC presented two new digital ventures under its accelerator program Next, which was launched the same year: ENOC Link, an automotive refueling service and Beema, an online vehicle insurance service.

== Operations ==
ENOC is a multi-interest oil and gas group that has operations in Dubai and Northern Emirates in UAE, and has operations in Abu Dhabi, the largest of the Emirate. One of its subsidiaries, ENOC Processing Company LCC (EPCL), runs the Jebel Ali refinery in Dubai.

The ENOC Group comprises many related subsidiaries, across two main categories - energy operations and general services - covering upstream, midstream, and downstream sectors.

In June 2015, ENOC acquired the remaining 46% of Dragon Oil for £3.7 billion.

== Awards ==
In 2018, the group was awarded a Transform Award MENA Bronze.

In 2020, ENOC Group won the Dubai Gold Award for Quality, which honors the outstanding performance of organizations, during a virtual ceremony held on November 11, 2020.

== See also ==
- Abu Dhabi National Oil Company (ADNOC)
