= Alaja, Turkmenistan =

Alaja Alaja
- Location in Turkmenistan
- Coordinates: 39°21′28″N 53°13′11″E
- Country: Turkmenistan
- Province: Balkan Province
- District: Balkanabat
- Town: Hazar
- Time zone: +5 GMT
- Area code: +(993)

Alaja, (Russian: Аладжа), is an oil-loading terminal in Balkan Province in western Turkmenistan on the Caspian Sea.

== Etymology ==
In the Turkmen language, alaja is an amulet bracelet woven of alternating colors of thread, usually black and white, worn to ward off the evil eye. The original Turkic meaning of the term is "striped", hence the name of the locality, because "there is water on both sides".

== See also ==
- Balkan Province
- List of cities, towns and villages in Turkmenistan
