= Gumdag =

Gumdag Gumdag şäherçesi
- Town
- Location in Turkmenistan
- Coordinates: 39°12′15″N 54°35′06″E
- Country: Turkmenistan
- Province: Balkan Region
- City: Balkanabat

Population (2022 official census)
  - Total: 30,884
- Time zone: UTC+5

Gumdag, formerly known as Kum-Dag (in Russian: "Кум-Даг"), is a town in Balkan Province, Turkmenistan. It is located 43 km southeast of the city of Balkanabat. To the south-east of the town lies the Boyadag Mud Volcano. In 2022, it had a population of 30,884 people.

== Etymology ==
The name is derived from two words in Turkmen, gum ("sand") and dag ("mountain, hill"). Atanyyazow postulates that the name came from the sand hill 3 km to the west where the first oil well in the area was drilled.

== Economy ==
The town is home to the Gumdag oil and gas field, which is the main driver of the local economy.

== History ==
Before Gumdag was established, the settlement was called Khuday-Dag, Bahangosha and Monjukly. Gumdag was founded as a village in the 1930s by nomadic families from nearby settlements. In the same years, a well-drilling machine was installed by the government on the sand hill 3 km west of the village. With the development of oil production from the region, people from Balkanabat and other cities started to flock here. From 1951 to 1956, it was attached to the Ashgabat region. It used to be a city-with-district-status until November 2022, and alongside Hazar, it became subordinate to Balkanabat, the capital city of the province.

== Population ==
1959	1970	1979	1989	2022
9,237	11,615	14,449	16,529	30,884
