= Hazar, Turkmenistan =

City in Balkan Province, Turkmenistan

Hazar Hazar şäherçesi
- Town
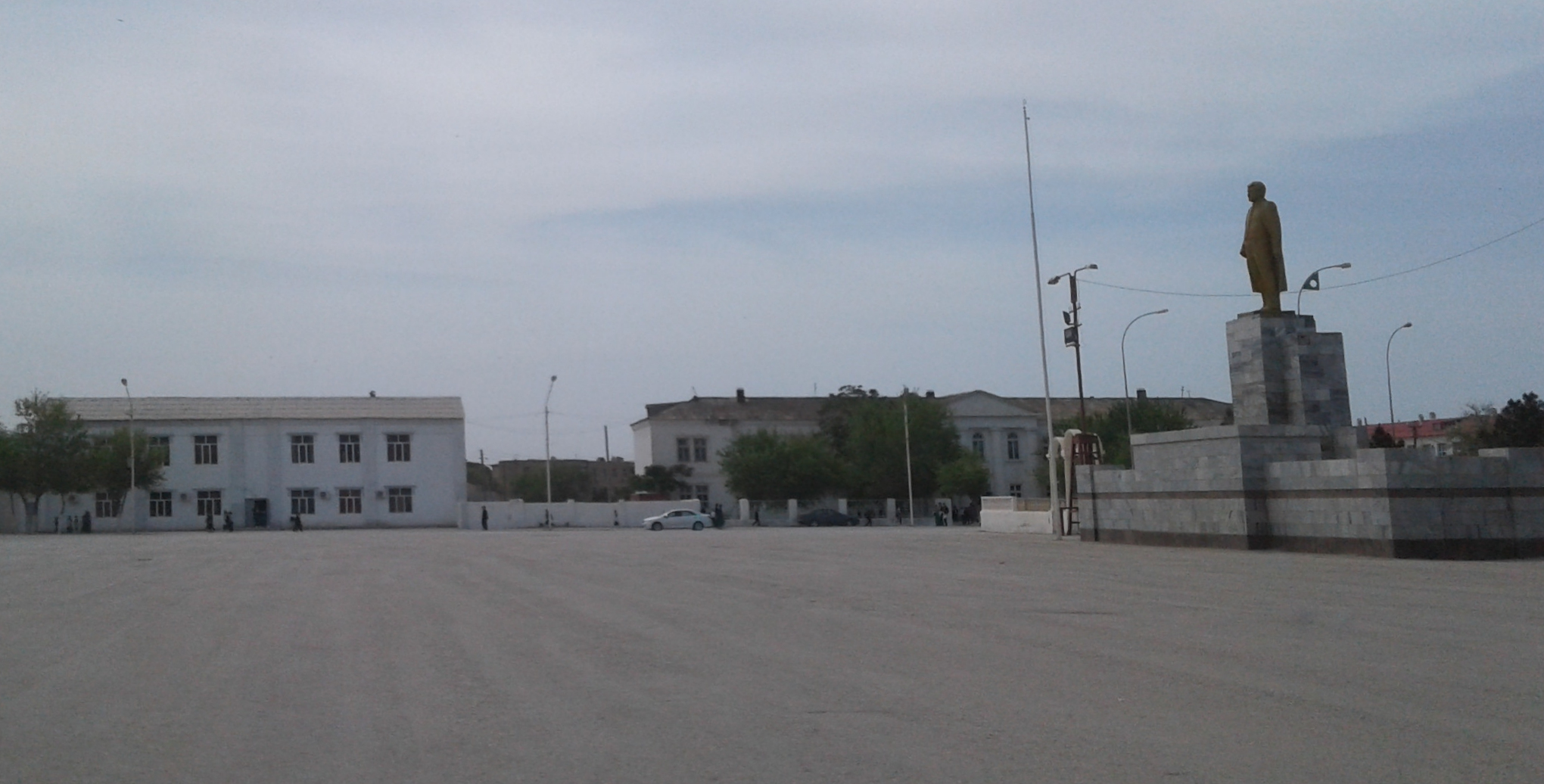
- Central square of Hazar, Balkan Province, Turkmenistan, with statue of Saparmurat Niyazov

- Location in Turkmenistan
- Coordinates: 39°24′46″N 53°7′41″E
- Country: Turkmenistan
- Province: Balkan Province
- District: Balkanabat
- Established: 1956 (as a city)

Population (2022 official census)
  - Town: 15,436
  - Urban: 14,671
  - Rural: 765

Hazar, known as Çeleken until 1999 (Russian: Челекен, romanized: Cheleken) is a seaport town in Turkmenistan located on the Cheleken Peninsula of the Caspian Sea. In November 2022, it was downgraded from city-with-district-status to a town and, along with Gumdag, became subordinate to the city of Balkanabat. As of 2022, its population reached 14,671 people.

== Etymology ==
Hazar (also Khazar, a backformation of Russian: Хазар) was the name of a Turkic people, the Khazars, who lived on the shores of the Caspian Sea and lent their tribal name to the body of water in several Turkic languages, including Turkmen. The current name of the city thus comes from the Turkmen name of the Caspian Sea. The former name, Çeleken (Cheleken), is the name of the former island, now peninsula, on which the city is located. The word comes from Persian chahar kan چهارکن, meaning "four wells" or "four riches", referring to the wealth of petroleum found on the peninsula.

== Economy ==
=== Petroleum ===
This city and area are rich in petroleum oil reserves. As far back as the 1st century, the Greek philosopher Strabo said, "They say, diggers opened oily springs near the Okh River. Indeed, if a country has alkaline, asphalt, sticky, sulfurous waters, it is most likely to have oily springs. Only, their scarceness makes this fact miraculous." In 1743, a Captain by the name of Woodruff of a British merchant company remarked that 36 Ogurdjali families resided on the island. They had 26 large boats and some oil wells.

Prior to 1917, the Moscow Society, Cheleken-Dagestan Society, Kuzmin and Co, Bostondjoglo, South Caucasian Mining Society, and Second Moscow Group were among the established Russian oil companies. By 1925, after the establishment of Soviet Turkmenistan, wells had been nationalized and oil production decreased. By the late 1950s, oil production index went up again.

Dragon Oil, a petroleum extraction firm owned by Emirates National Oil Company, is the major employer in Hazar and operates the oil loading terminal there.

=== Iodine and bromine plant ===
It opened in 1938 and was expanded in 1968. Following planned renovations and upgrades, the Hazar iodine plant will have a design capacity of 300 tonnes of iodine, plus 4500 tonnes of bromine per year.

== Dependencies ==
Hazar as a town has a single dependent rural village:

Hazar, town:

- Garagöl, village
