= Dragon Oil =

Emirati oil company

Dragon Oil Holdings LLC
- Type: Public limited company
- Industry: Oil
- Founded: 1971
- Headquarters: Dubai
- Key people: Saeed Mohammed Al Tayer (Chairman); Abdulkarim Ahmed AlMaazmi (CEO)
- Revenue: US$ 1.093.1 billion (2014)
- Operating income: US$ 578.6 million (2014)
- Net income: US$ 650.5 million (2014)
- Website: www.dragonoil.com

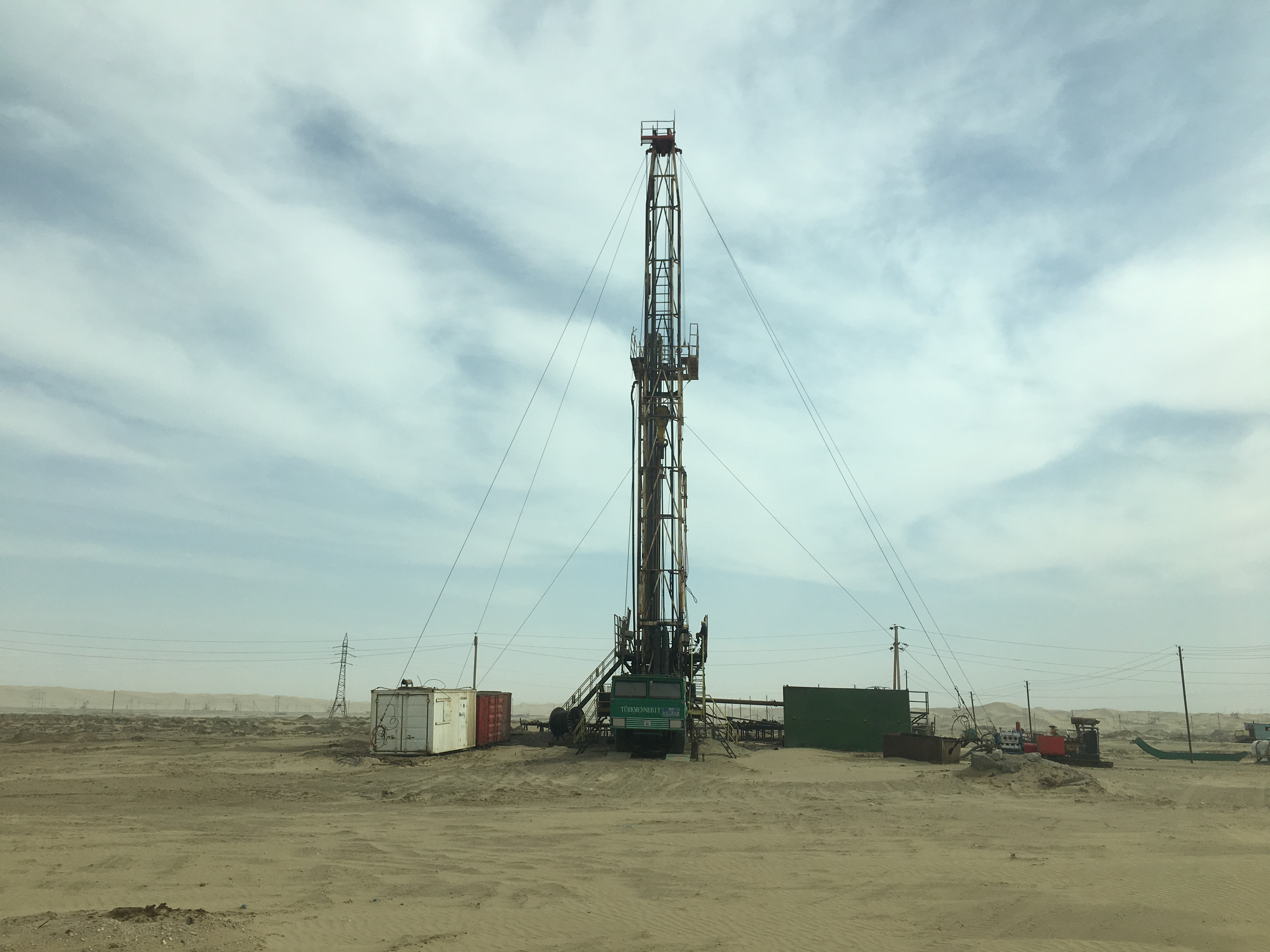
Oil rig on Cheleken, 2018

Dragon Oil Holdings LLC is an international oil and gas exploration, development and production business. It is based and registered in Dubai and its operations are primarily located in Turkmenistan. The company was listed on the Irish Stock Exchange until it was acquired by the Emirates National Oil Company (ENOC). It is now a wholly owned upstream subsidiary of the ENOC-Group.

== History ==
The company was established as Oliver Prospecting & Mining Co. Limited in Ireland by Oliver Waldron in 1971. It changed its name to Dragon Oil in 1993 and invested in the Cheleken oilfield.

The Emirates National Oil Company bought a majority stake in the company in 1999 and the headquarters were moved to Dubai that same year.

In 1999, Dragon Oil signed a Production sharing agreement (PSA) with the Government of Turkmenistan, aiming to re-develop the Cheleken field in the Caspian Sea. The current PSA expires in 2025.

Between 2002 and 2005 Dragon Oil raised capital for exploration. In the period 2005 to 2015 in total eight exploration licences were taken in Algeria (2), Tunisia (1), the Filippines (1), Afghanistan (2), Iraq (1) and Egypt (1) (see the detailed information below in "Operations"). These were partly operated partly in JV partnership, and a separate, new DragonOil Exploration Department with new staff was set up to manage these assets.

In 2012 Dragon Oil launched a $200 million share buyback and the shares in Dubai rose 7 %. In 2013 Forbes ranked Dragon Oil on Forbes Global 2000 at place 1902.

From 2012 to 2015, Dragon Oil suffered setbacks caused by several delivery delays of a drilling platform, an important part of the companies progress in the Caspian Sea.

In June 2015 the Emirates National Oil Company acquired the remaining 46% of Dragon Oil for £3.7 billion, becoming the sole owner of Dragon Oil. ENOC had attempted to buy the remaining percentage since 2009, at 455p a share, and offered 650p in March 2015. The final price was 800p a share, after extensive back and forth with different minority shareholders.

The company was delisted from the London and Irish Stock Exchange as of 7 September 2015.

In November 2015, the company was in talks to invest around $10 billion into a natural gas pipeline, the Tapi project, from Turkmenistan to India. In 2016, Dragon pre-qualified for a bidding round for different new oil fields under new contract terms in Iraq and took part in a bidding round in 2018.

In August 2017, Dragon Oil signed a five-year contract with Topaz Energy & Marine for the delivery of six new offshore vessels, including five anchor-handlers and one Emergency Recovery and Response Vessel. In 2018 Dragon Oil recorded a production of 93,000 barrels per day (14,800 m^{3}/d). In 2019 the company announced its plans to triple the production by 2025 as part of its upstream investment drive. In the next 10 years the company wanted to spend $13 billion to targets a higher production.

In November 2025, Dragon Oil entered two memoranda of Understanding (MoU), one with Malaysia's Petronas and the other with the State Oil Company of the Republic of Azerbaijan (SOCAR), to explore opportunities for joint projects in their respected regions.

== Operations ==
Dragon Oils headquarters is in Dubai, UAE with all of the senior management based on site. Further offices are located in Mazar-i-Sharif, Afghanistan, Cairo, Egypt and Algiers, Algeria.

Its principal producing asset is at Cheleken, in the eastern section of the Caspian Sea, offshore from Turkmenistan. It is also involved in exploration activities in Tunisia. The field is operated from the onshore base near the town of Hazar, Turkmenistan.

In 2009 to 2010, Dragon Oil reached a production level of 50,000 barrels (7,900 m^{3}) of oil per day from Chekelen and from 2011-2014, between 60,000 to 70,000 barrels (9,500 to 11,100 m^{3}) of oil per day overall production capacity. The field holds an estimated 663 million barrels (105 million cubic metres) of oil and condensates, and 1.3 billion ft^{3} (37 million m^{3}) of gas reserves. The company produced an average of 61,500 barrels (9,780 m^{3}) of oil per day in 2011, 76,600 in 2012, 73,750 in 2013 and 44,000 in 2014. By 2015, Dragon aimed to reach 100,000 barrels (16,000 m^{3}) per day, by adding around 30,000 to 50,000 barrels (4,800 to 7,900 m^{3}) of oil per day in production capacity through M&A's. Production from Cheleken reached 100,000 barrels (16,000 m^{3}) of oil per day in June 2015.

It is also involved in exploration activities in Afghanistan (Sanduqli and Mazar-i-Sharif blocks), Algeria (Tinrhert Nord Perimeter and Msari Akabli Perimeter), Egypt (East Zeit Bay), Iraq (Block 9) and Tunisia (the Bargou Exploration Permit). The legal process behind the Tunisian contracts has been questioned by Tunisian corruption watchdog I WATCH.

Past operations also include the Philippines, where Dragon Oil explored in the offshore Palawan Basin under agreement SC 63 until November 2015.
