= Ekerem =

Ekerem Ekerem şäherçesi
- Town
- Location in Turkmenistan
- Coordinates: 38°3′49″N 53°50′28″E
- Country: Turkmenistan
- Region: Balkan Region
- District: Esenguly District

Population (2022 official census)
  - Town: 6 058
  - Urban: 3,972
  - Rural: 2,086
- Time zone: +5 GMT
- Area code: +(993)

Ekerem, formerly known as Okarem (in Russian: "Окарем"), is a town in Balkan Region in western Turkmenistan on the Caspian Sea coast. It is the site of one of Turkmenistan's three oil loading terminals for seaborne shipment of liquid petroleum products. As of 2022, the town reached a population of 3,972 people.

== Dependencies ==
Ekerem as a town has only a single dependent rural village:

Ekerem, town:

- Gamyşlyja, village

== See also ==
- Balkan Province
- List of cities, towns and villages in Turkmenistan
