= List of leaders of Turkmenistan =

Below is a list of leaders of present-day Turkmenistan since the establishment of Turkmen SSR in 1925.

== List of khans ==
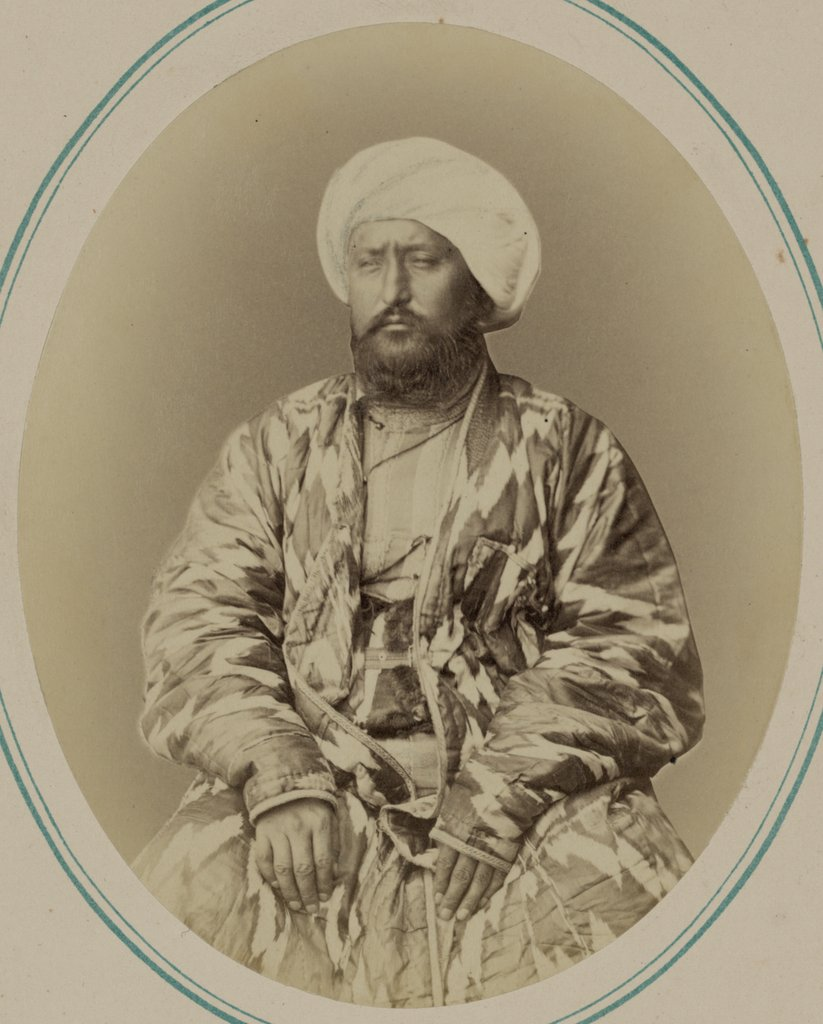
Seyid Muhammad Khudayar Khan, the 1860s

Reign	Ruler
1709–1722	Shahrukh Biy
1722–1734	Abd al-Rahim Biy
1734–1751	Abd al-Karim Biy
1751–1752	Irdana Biy (1st Reign)
1752–1753	Baba Biy
1753–1769	Irdana Biy (2nd Reign)
1769–1770	Sulayman Biy
1770–1799	Narbuta Biy
1799–1811	Alim Khan
1811–1822	Muhammad Umar Khan
1822–1842	Muhammad Ali Khan
1842–1844	Shir Ali Khan
1844	Murad Beg Khan
1844–1852	Muhammad Khudayar Khan (1st Reign)
	Mingbashi Musulmonqul (Regent for Khudayar Khan)
1852–1858	Muhammad Khudayar Khan (2nd Reign)
1858–1862	Muhammad Mallya Beg Khan
1862	Shah Murad Khan
1862–1863	Muhammad Khudayar Khan (3rd Reign)
1863–1865	Sultan Sayyid Khan (puppet of Alimqul)
1865	Bil Bahchi Khan
1865–1875	Muhammad Khudayar Khan (4th Reign)
1875	Nasruddin Khan (1st Reign)
1875	Muhammad Pulad Beg Khan
1876	Nasruddin Khan (2nd Reign)

== Khans of Yomud Turkmen (in Gasan-Kuli) ==
- 1836 - 1843 Kiyat Niyaz Khan (b. c.1762 - d. 1843)
- 1843 - af.1871 Kadyr Muhammad Khan (b. c.1798 - d. 18..)

== Khans of Merv Tekke Turkmen (in Merv) ==
(Tokhtamish division, the largest one having precedence over the other two)

- 1855 - 1878 Kouchud Khan (b. 1823 – d. 1878)
- c.1879 Baba Khan (1st time) (d. af.1885)
- c.1880 Kajar Khan (d. af.1884)
- c.1881 Baba Khan (2nd time) (s.a.)
- Apr 1881 - 1882 Makhdum Kuli Khan (b. 1854 – d. 1924)
- 1882 - Jan 1884 Mohamed Yusuf Khan (b. c.1863 – d. 1919)
- 1882 - Jan 1884 Guljemal Khanim (f) (b. 1836 – d. 1919)

                            (de facto regent for Mohamed Yusuf Khan)

=== Khans of Akhal Tekke Turkmen (in Geok-Tepe, near Ashkhabad) ===
- 1855 - 5 May 1880 Nurberdi Khan (b. 1830 - d. 1880)
- 5 May 1880 - Jan 1881 Makhdum Kuli Khan

=== Governors-General of Turkestan ===
Heads (from 1901, Military governors) of Tanscaspian (Zakaspiyskaya) oblast (subordinated to commanders-in-chief of Caucasus 1881-1898; from 7 Jan 1898, to the governors-general of Russian Turkestan Kray)

- 18 May 1881 - 3 Apr 1883 Pyotr Fyodorovich Rerberg (b. 1835 - d. 1912)
- 3 Apr 1883 - 8 Apr 1890 Aleksandr Vissarionovich Komarov (b. 1830 - d. 1904)

*8 Apr 1890 - 13 Jan 1898  Aleksey Nikolayevich Kuropatkin    (b. 1848 - d. 1925)

- 31 Oct 1898 - 1901 Andrey Andreyevich Bogolyubov (b. 1841 - d. 1909)
- 23 Apr 1901 - 27 Dec 1902 Dean Ivanovich Subbotich (b. 1852 - d. 1920)

                            (= Dejan Subotić)

- 27 Dec 1902 - 18 Dec 1905 Yevgeniy Yevgeniyevich Usakovskiy (b. 1851 - d. 1935)
- 18 Dec 1905 - 23 Feb 1908 Vladimir Andreyevich Kosagovskiy (b. 1857 - d. 1918)
- 23 Feb 1908 - 26 Dec 1910 Mikhail Dmitriyevich Yevreyinov (b. 1851 - d. 1910)
- 14 Jan 1911 - 2 Nov 1912 Fyodor Aleksandrovich Shostak (b. 1853 - d. 1912)
- 28 Jan 1913 - Aug 1916 Leonid Vilgelmovich Lesh (b. 1862 - d. 1934)
- Aug 1916 - 1917 Nikolay Klavdiyevich Kolmakov (b. 1858 - d. 19..)

                            (acting)

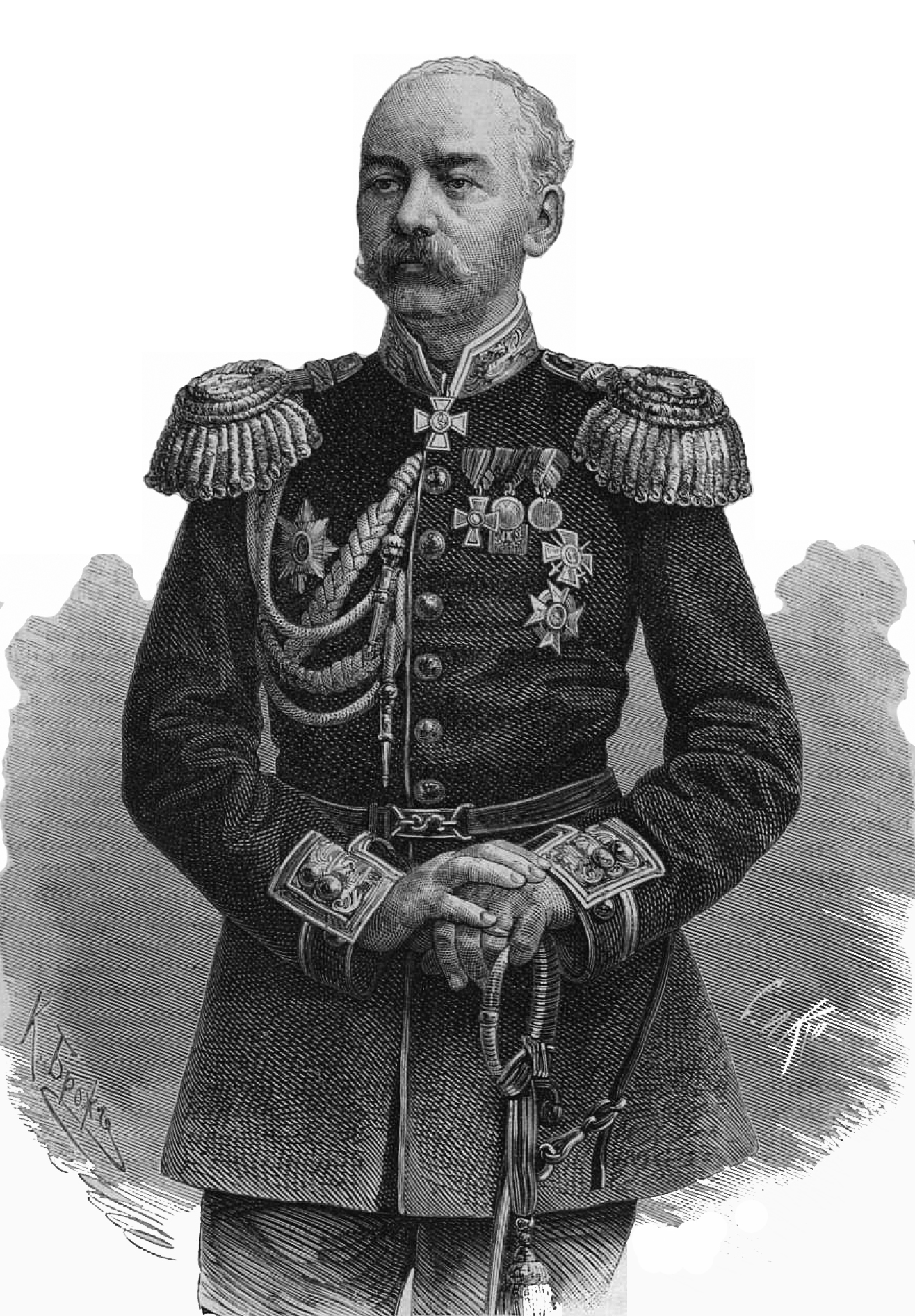
Konstantin von Kaufman, first and longest-serving Governor-General of Turkestan (1867–1882)

The governorate-general was administered by a series of military generals appointed by the Tsar.

Name	Tenure	Military Rank
Konstantin von Kaufman	1867–1882	Engineer-General
Mikhail Chernyayev	1882–1884	Lieutenant General
Nikolai Rozenbakh	1884–1889	General of Infantry
Alexander Vrevsky	1889–1898	Lieutenant General / General of Infantry
Sergei Dukhovskoi	1898–1901	General of Infantry
Nikolai Ivanov	1901–1904	Lieutenant General
Nikolai Tevyashev	1904–1905	General of Cavalry
Dejan Subotić	1905–1906	Lieutenant General
Nikolai Grodekov	1906–1908	General of Infantry
Pavel Mishchenko	1908–1909	General of Artillery
Alexander Samsonov	1909–1914	General of Cavalry
Fedor Martson	1914–1916	General of Infantry
Aleksey Kuropatkin	1916–1917	General of Infantry

== Government ==
- Mukhamedzhan Tynyshpaev
- Mustafa Shokay

== Transcaspian Government Ashkhabad Committee ==
On 14 July 1918 The Ashkhabad Executive Committee was founded by Mensheviks and Social Revolutionaries following their successful revolt against the Bolsheviks of Tashkent. This committee took the name of the Trans Caspian Provisional Government in November 1918, but is generally referred to as the Transcaspian Government.

The initial leadership consisted of:

- Fyodor Funtikov, Socialist Revolutionary worker, President
- Vladimir Dhokov, railway worker
- D. Kurilov, railway worker
- L. A. Zimen, school teacher and orientalist, Minister of Foreign Affairs

== Chairmen ==
Chairmen of the Transcaspian (Zakaspiyskaya) Oblast Provisional Executive Committee

- 14 Jul 1918 – 1 Jan 1919 Fyodor Andrianovich Funtikov (b. 1875 - d. 1926) PSR

                            (from Nov 1918, also chairman of the
                            Transcaspian Oblast Provisional Government)

- Aug 1918 - Oct 1918 L. Kurylev (b. 18.. - d. 1919) PSR

                            (acting for absent Funtikov)

- 2 Jan 1919 - Mar 1919 (First) Transcaspian Oblast Public Safety Committee

                         [three members as recorded on 7 Jan 1919]
                          - A.G. Belov
                          - Semyon L'vovich Druzhkin         (d. 1919?)
                          - Lev Aleksandrovich Zimin         (b. 1886 - d. 1920)  PSR

- Mar 1919 - 8 Aug 1919 (Second) Transcaspian Oblast Public Safety Committee

                         [three members as recorded on 5 Apr 1919]
                          - D.A. Akimov
                          - Anton Yevgrafovich Kruten'       (b. 1861 - d. 19..)  Mil
                          - Lev Aleksandrovich Zimin         (s.a.)               PSR
                          - the two below reportedly added after 5 Apr 1919 -
                          - Khadzhi Murat                    (b. 1889 - d. 1937)  Mil
                          - Oraz Serdar                      (b. 1871

== Chairmen of the Central Executive Committee ==
1. Kobozev, Pyotr Alekseevich (April – May 1918), Solkin, Andrey Fedorovich, contributor (April – 2 June 1918)
2. Tobolin, Ivan Osipovich (2 June – 5 October 1918)
3. Votintsev, Vsevolod Dmitrievich (October 1918 – 19 January 1919)
4. – (19 January – 31 March 1919)
5. Kazakov, Aristarkh Andreevich (31 March – July 1919)
6. Kobozev, Pyotr Alekseevich (July – September 1919)
7. Apin, Ivan Andreevich (September 1919 – January 1920)
8. Ryskulov, Turar Ryskulovich (January – 21 July 1920)
9. Biserov, Mukhammedzhan (21 July – August 1920)
10. Rakhimbaev, Abdullo Rakhimbaevich (4 August 1920 – May 1921), Khodzhanov Sultanbek, acting, prev. (12 May 1920 – ?)
11. Tyuryakulov, Nazir Tyuryakulovich (May 1921 – June 1922)
12. Rakhimbaev, Abdullo Rakhimbaevich (June – October 1922)
13. Khidir-Aliev, Inagadzhan (October 1922 – 1 January 1924), Dadabaev Butabay, vrid. prev. (August – September 1923)
14. Aytakov, Nedirbai (9 January – November 1924)

Chairmen of the Council of People's Commissars ("Turksovnarkom").

Initial date	Final date	Name
15 November 1917	November 1918	Fyodor Kolesov
November 1918	19 January 1919	Vladislav Figelskiy (ru)
19 January 1919	31 March 1919	Post vacant
31 March 1919	12 September 1919	Karp Sorokin (ru)
12 September 1919	March 1920	Turksovnarkom defunct
March 1920	May 1920	Jānis Rudzutaks
May 1920	September 1920	Isidor Lubimov
19 September 1920	October 1922	Kaikhaziz Atabayev
October 1922	12 January 1924	Turar Ryskulov
12 January 1924	27 October 1924	Sharustam Islamov (ru)

== Turkmen Soviet Socialist Republic (1925–1991) ==
=== First Secretaries of the Communist Party of Turkmenistan ===
No.	Picture	Name (Birth–Death)	Took office	Left office	Political party
First Secretary
1		Ivan Mezhlauk (1891–1938)	19 November 1924	1926	CPT/CPSU
2		Shaymardan Ibragimov (1899–1957)	June 1926	1927	CPT/CPSU
3		Nikolay Paskutsky (1894–1938)	1927	1928	CPT/CPSU
4		Grigory Aronshtam (1893–1938)	11 May 1928	August 1930	CPT/CPSU
5		Yakov Popok (1894–1938)	August 1930	15 April 1937	CPT/CPSU
6		Anna Mukhamedov (1900–1938)	April 1937	October 1937	CPT/CPSU
7		Yakov Chubin (1893–1956)	October 1937	November 1939	CPT/CPSU
8		Mikhail Fonin (1905–1974)	November 1939	March 1947	CPT/CPSU
9		Shadzha Batyrov (1908–1965)	March 1947	July 1951	CPT/CPSU
10		Sukhan Babyev (1910–1995)	July 1951	14 December 1958	CPT/CPSU
11		Dzhuma Durdy Karayev (1910–1960)	14 December 1958	4 May 1960	CPT/CPSU
12		Balysh Ovezov (1915–1975)	13 June 1960	24 December 1969	CPT/CPSU
13		Muhammetnazar Gapurow (1922–1999)	24 December 1969	21 December 1985	CPT/CPSU
14		Saparmurat Niyazov (1940–2006)	21 December 1985	16 December 1991	CPT/CPSU

=== Second Secretaries ===
No.	Picture	Name (Birth–death)	Took office	Left office	Political party
Second Secretary
-		Anna Mukhammedov (1900–1938)	3 March 1935	October 1937	CPT/CPSU
-		Allaberdy Berdyev (1904–1964)	16 July 1938	20 August 1940	CPT/CPSU
-		Kurban Permanov(1909–1969)	28 November 1941	17 February 1945	CPT/CPSU
-		Shadzha Batyrov (1908–1965)	November 1945	July 1947	CPT/CPSU
-		Arkady Sennikov (1908–1974)	July 1947	10 September 1953	CPT/CPSU
-		Polikarp Dolgov (1910–1989)	10 September 1953	14 February 1954	CPT/CPSU
-		Fyedor Grishaenkov (1914–1983)	14 February 1954	13 June 1960	CPT/CPSU
-		Mikhail Pimenov (born 1914, death date unknown)	13 June 1960	25 March 1963	CPT/CPSU
-		Vasily Rykov (1918–2011)	25 March 1963	14 April 1975	CPT/CPSU
-		Viktor Pereudin (1923–2001)	14 April 1975	20 December 1980	CPT/CPSU
-		Albert Rachkov (1927–2023)	20 December 1980	26 July 1986	CPT/CPSU
-		Sergei Nesterenko (born 1935)	26 July 1986	1991	CPT/CPSU
-		Alexander Dodonov (1946–2018)	1991	1991	CPT/CPSU

=== Chairmen of the Revolutionary Committee ===
- Gaygysyz Atabayev (October 1924 – December 1924)
- Nedirbay Aytakov (December 1920 – February 1925)

=== Chairmen of the Central Executive Committee ===
- Nedirbay Aytakov (20 February 1925 – 21 July 1937)
- Batyr Ataýew (acting) (August 1937 – October 1937)
- Hyvaly Babaýew (October 1937 – 24 July 1938)

=== Chairman of the Supreme Soviet ===
- Allaberdi Berdiyev (24 July 1938 – 27 July 1938)

=== Chairmen of the Presidium of the Supreme Soviet ===
- Hyvaly Babayev (27 July 1938 – 1941)
- Allaberdy Berdyev (1941 – 6 March 1948)
- Akmamed Saryyev (6 March 1948 – 30 March 1959)
- Nurberdi Bayramov (30 March 1959 – 26 March 1963)
- Annamuhamet Gylyjow (26 March 1963 – 15 December 1978)
- Bally Ýazgulyýevyç Ýazgulyýew (15 December 1978 – 13 August 1988)
- Roza Atamuradovna Bazarova (13 August 1988 – 19 January 1990)

=== Chairman of the Supreme Soviet ===
- Saparmurat Niyazov (19 January 1990 – 2 November 1990)

=== Chairmen of the Council of Ministers ===
- Gaygysyz Atabayev (20 February 1925 – 8 July 1937)
- Aýtbaý Hudaýbergenov (October 1937 – 17 October 1945)
- Suhan Babayev (17 October 1945 – 14 July 1951)
- Balysh Ovezov (14 July 1951 – 14 January 1958)
- Jumadurdy Karayev (14 January 1958 – 20 January 1959)
- Balysh Ovezov (20 January 1959 – 13 June 1960)
- Abdy Annaliyev (13 June 1960 – 26 March 1963)
- Muhammetnazar Gapurow (26 March 1963 – 25 December 1969)
- Oraz Orazmuhammedow (25 December 1969 – 17 December 1975)
- Bally Yazkuliyev (17 December 1975 – 15 December 1978)
- Chary Karriyev (15 December 1978 – 26 March 1985)
- Saparmurat Niyazov (26 March 1985 – 4 January 1986)
- Annamurat Hojamyradow (4 January 1986 – 17 November 1989)
- Han Ahmedow (5 December 1989 – 27 October 1991)

== Turkmenistan (1990–present) ==
Political parties

Communist Party of Turkmenistan (CPT)
Democratic Party of Turkmenistan (DPT)

Other affiliations

Independent

Status

Denotes acting president

Symbols

^{T} Term extension referendum

^{†} Died in office

No.	Portrait	Name (born–died)	Elected	Term of office			Political party
No.	Portrait	Name (born–died)	Elected	Took office	Left office	Time in office	Political party
1		Saparmurat Niyazov (1940–2006)	1990	2 November 1990	21 December 2006^{[†]}	16 years, 49 days	CPT (until Dec. 1991)
1		Saparmurat Niyazov (1940–2006)	1992; 1994^{[T]}	2 November 1990	21 December 2006^{[†]}	16 years, 49 days	DPT
2		Gurbanguly Berdimuhamedow (born 1957)	—	21 December 2006	14 February 2007	55 days	DPT (until 2013)
2		Gurbanguly Berdimuhamedow (born 1957)	2007; 2012	14 February 2007	19 March 2022	15 years, 33 days	DPT (until 2013)
2		Gurbanguly Berdimuhamedow (born 1957)	2017	14 February 2007	19 March 2022	15 years, 33 days	Independent
3		Serdar Berdimuhamedow (born 1981)	2022	19 March 2022	Incumbent	4 years, 247 days	DPT

== National Leader ==
On 21 January 2023, President Serdar Berdimuhamedow appointed his father, former President Gurbanguly Berdimuhamedow, chairman of the People's Council of Turkmenistan with the title "National Leader" (Turkmen: Milli Lider).

== Chairmen ==
Chairmen of the Transcaspian Oblast Council of People's Commissars

- 18 Dec 1917 - 12 Jan 1918 Vladislav Nikonovich RSDRP-B
- 12 Jan 1918 - Feb 1918 Boris Ilyich Tuzin (1st time) (b. 1893 – d. 1918) RSDRP-B
- Feb 1918 - Apr 1918 Zinoviy Isayevich Pechatnikov (b. 1882 – d.af.1935)PLSR
- Apr 1918 - 18 May 1918 Boris Ilyich Tuzin (2nd time) (s.a.) RKP

                            (acting)

- May 1918 - 12 Jul 1918 Vissarion Tadiozovich Teliya (b. 18.. - d. 1918) SSRM

== Allied (British) Occupation 1918-1919 ==
Commander of the British "Malleson" Military Mission to Turkestan (MALMISS)(at Mashad)

- 16 Jul 1918 - May 1920 Wilfrid Malleson (U.K.) (b. 1866 - d. 1946) Mil

Political Officer of British Military Mission to Turkestan at Ashgabat (Ashkhabad)

- 3 Aug 1918 - 14 Apr 1919 Reginald Teague-Jones (U.K.) (b. 1889 - d. 1988) Mil

                            (= Ronald Sinclair)

== Prime Minister of Turkmenistan ==
№	Portrait	Name (Born-Died)	Took office	Left office	Political party
1		Gaygysyz Atabayev (1887–1938)	20 February 1925	8 July 1937	Communist
2		Aýtbaý Hudaýbergenov (1906–1995)	October 1937	17 October 1945	Communist
3		Suhan Babayev (1910–1995)	17 October 1945	15 March 1946	Communist
4		Suhan Babayev (1910–1995)	15 March 1946	14 July 1951	Communist
5		Balysh Ovezov (1915–1975)	14 July 1951	14 January 1958	Communist
6		Jumadurdy Karayev (1910–1960)	14 January 1958	20 January 1959	Communist
7		Balysh Ovezov (1915–1975)	20 January 1959	13 June 1960	Communist
8		Abdy Annaliyev (1920–2007)	13 June 1960	26 March 1963	Communist
9		Muhammetnazar Gapurow (1922–1999)	26 March 1963	25 December 1969	Communist
10		Oraz Orazmuhammedow (1928/1930–???)	25 December 1969	17 December 1975	Communist
11		Bally Yazkuliyev (born 1930)	17 December 1975	15 December 1978	Communist
12		Chary Karriyev (born 1932)	15 December 1978	26 March 1985	Communist
13		Saparmurat Niyazov (1940–2006)	26 March 1985	4 January 1986	Communist
14		Annamurat Hojamyradow (born 1935)	4 January 1986	17 November 1989	Communist
15		Han Ahmedow (1936–2006)	5 December 1989	27 October 1991	Communist
16		Han Ahmedow (1936–2006)	27 October 1991	18 May 1992	Communist
17		Saparmurat Niyazov (1940–2006)	2 November 1990	21 December 2006 (Died in office)	Communist
17		Saparmurat Niyazov (1940–2006)	2 November 1990	21 December 2006 (Died in office)	Democratic
18		Gurbanguly Berdimuhamedow (1957–)	21 December 2006	14 February 2007	Democratic
19		Gurbanguly Berdimuhamedow (1957–)	14 February 2007	19 March 2022	Democratic
19		Gurbanguly Berdimuhamedow (1957–)	14 February 2007	19 March 2022	Independent
20		Serdar Berdimuhamedow (1981–)	19 March 2022		Democratic

== Current Deputy Chairman ==
Portfolio	Incumbent	Since
Foreign Affairs	Raşit Meredow	2001
Agriculture and Dashoguz	Taňryguly Atahallyýew	2023
Construction, Industry, Energy and Ashgabat	Baýmyrat Annamämmedow	2023
Culture and Media	Bahar Seýidowa	2025
Economy and Finance	Hojamyrat Geldimyradow	2022
Education, Health, Science, Sports and Mary	Baýramgül Orazdurdyýewa	2024
Oil and Gas and Lebap province	Batyr Amanov	2023
Trade, Textile Industry, and Entrepreneurship, and Ahal	Nokerguly Atagulyýew	2024
Transport and Communication and Balkan	Mämmethan Çakyýew	2025

== List of total Deputy Chairmen ==
Since the formation of the Cabinet of Ministers of Turkmenistan in 1992, the position of Deputy Chairman of the Cabinet of Ministers has been held by 99 people (as of May 12, 2017, excluding those reappointed).

Image	Name	Appointed	Dismissed	Time in office	Notes
	Atta Charyyev	January 1992	June 1992	5 months	
	Mukhammed Abalakov	11 July 1995	27 June 1999		
	Dortkuli Aydogdyev	15 November 2002	16 May 2006		
	Mukhammedmurad Aydogdyev	12 May 2017			
	Orazgeldi Aydogdyev	26 June 1992	3 April 2001	8 years, 2 months	
	Aganiyaz Akiyev	22 August 2005	25 January 2006		
	Muradgeldy Akmamedov	21 July 2008	8 July 2011		
	Dadebay Amangeldyev	13 January 2017			
	Jumageldy Amansakhatov	21 July 1992	2 August 1996		
	Dadebay Annageldyev	11 October 1996	1996 or 1997		
	Bayram Annameredov	13 January 2017			
	Jumaniyaz Annaorazov	1 July 2005	12 May 2006		
	Redjepbay Arazov	14 March 2002	29 September 2003		
	Murad Artykov	10 January 2014	14 August 2015		
	Amangeldy Ataev	3 March 2000	2 October 2001		
	Kurbanmurad Ataev	10 July 2006	14 February 2007		
	Redjepdurdy Ataev	29 September 2003	6 January 2005		
	Enebay Ataeva	6 May 2002	30 October 2004		
	Nokerguly Atagulyev	22 February 2012	6 July 2012		
	Begench Atamuradov	14 November 2003	6 January 2005		
	Batyr Atdayev	5 February 2016	12 May 2017		
	Khan Akhmedov	1992	1992		
	Kurbannazar Ashirov	23 February 2007	14 April 2008		
	Maksat Babaev	5 April 2017			
	Serdar Babaev	4 July 1999	6 June 2000		
	Babamurad Bazarov	26 June 1992	1993		
	Redjep Bazarov	29 April 2016	5 April 2017		
	Dzhoraquli Babakuliev	26 June 1992	7 November 1994		
	Orazmurad Bekmuradov	31 August 2000	4 June 2001		
	Atamurad Berdyev	20 May 2005	15 December 2005		
	Gurbanguly Berdimuhamedov	3 April 2001	14 February 2007	5 years, 319 days	
	Khodzhamurad Geldymuradov	14 April 2007	15 January 2009		
	Jamal Geoklenova	24 May 1999	23 August 2002		
	Annamukhammet Goçyev	8 July 2011	9 July 2015		
	Yusup Davudov	31 October 2005	14 February 2007		
	Tuvakmamed Dzhaparov	15 January 2009	8 July 2011		
	Alexander Dodonov	22 August 1996	14 April 1998		
	Shamukhammet Durdyliev	11 January 2013	13 January 2017		
	Akmurad Egeleeiv	21 February 2012	20 September 2013		
	Ammanazar Ilamanov	2 February 1996	16 July 1997		
	Babaniyaz Italmazov	12 July 2013	7 July 2014		
	Khekım Ishanov	1 November 1994	11 October 1996		
	Yagshygeldy Kakayev	24 July 2010	8 September 2010		
	Yagshygeldy Kakayev (reappointed)	28 May 2012	8 June 2013		
	Yagshygeldy Kakayev (reappointed)	6 November 2015	5 April 2017		
	Seidbay Kandymov	6 January 2000	6 May 2002		
	Annageldy Karadzhaev	24 February 2017			
	Kurbanmukhammed Kasymov	7 January 1993	2 April 1993		
	Rovshan Kerkavov	16 January 2001	9 July 2001		
	Yolly Kurbanmuradov	2 June 1997	20 May 2005		
	Orazmurad Kurbannazarov	10 January 2011	22 February 2012		
	Orazmurad Kurbannazarov	12 May 2017			
	Gulshat Mammedova	8 April 2016	24 February 2017		
	Kurbanmurad Mezilov	8 October 2010	2 December 2011		
	Rashid Meredov	21 February 2003	7 March 2005		
	Rashid Meredov	17 February 2007	Present	19 years, 277 days	
	Sapargeldy Motaev	21 July 1992	2 August 1996		
	Amandurdy Muradkuliev	8 March 2005	27 September 2005		
	Khodzhamukhammed Mukhammedov	12 November 2007	20 September 2013		
	Mukhammed Nazarov	2001	2002		
	Gozel Nuralieva	14 November 2003	11 August 2004		
	Niyazklych Nurklychev	1992	1992		
	Mamedniyaz Nurmamedov	8 July 2011	22 February 2012		
	Byagul Nurmyradova	18 February 2012	4 April 2014		
	Geldymurad Nurmukhammedov	1992	1992		
	Saparmurad Nuriyev	7 April 1997	28 January 2000		
	Batyr Ovezov	26 December 1994	11 July 1995		
	Yagmur Ovezov	26 June 1992	2 August 1996		
	Pirkuli Odeev	1992	7 July 1997		

== See also ==
- Politics of Turkmenistan
- Cabinet of Turkmenistan
- People's Council of Turkmenistan
- President of Turkmenistan
- Prime Minister of Turkmenistan
- Vice President of Turkmenistan
