= Politics of Turkmenistan =

The politics of Turkmenistan nominally takes place in the framework of a presidential republic, whereby the President of Turkmenistan is nominally both head of state and head of government. However, as of 21 January 2023 a "national leader" was appointed who chairs an independent People's Council (viz.) with authority to amend the constitution, and who exercises supreme political authority. No true opposition parties are allowed; every registered political party supports the third and current President Serdar Berdimuhamedow. The country is frequently described as a totalitarian state.

== Political background ==
After 69 years as part of the Soviet Union (including 67 years as a union republic), Turkmenistan declared its independence on 27 October 1991.

President for life Saparmyrat Nyýazow, a former bureaucrat of the Communist Party of the Soviet Union, ruled Turkmenistan from 1985, when he became head of the Communist Party of the Turkmen SSR, until his death in 2006. He ruled with totalitarian control over the country after the dissolution of the Soviet Union. On 28 December 1999 the Mejlis (parliament) declared Nyýazow President for Life. (The Mejlis itself had taken office only a week earlier in elections that included only candidates hand-picked by President Nyýazow; no opposition candidates were allowed.)

Prior to 2008, the authorities permitted only a single political party, the Democratic Party of Turkmenistan. Political gatherings are illegal unless government sanctioned.

All citizens must carry internal passports, noting place of residence—a practice carried over from the Soviet era. Movement into and out of the country, as well as within its borders, is difficult. Turkmenistan is dominated by a pervasive cult of personality extolling the late president Nyýazow as "Türkmenbaşy," literally "Head/Leader of the Turkmen," a title he assumed in 1993. His face adorned many everyday objects, from banknotes to bottles of vodka. The logo of Turkmen national television was his profile. The two books he wrote were mandatory reading in schools, and public servants were quizzed yearly about their knowledge of their contents. They were also common in shops and homes. Many institutions were named after Nyýazow's mother. All watches and clocks made had to bear his portrait printed on the dial-face. A giant 15-meter (50 ft) tall gold-plated statue of Nyýazow stood on a rotating pedestal in Ashgabat, so it would always face the sun and shine light onto the city.

A slogan popular in Turkmen propaganda was "Halk, Watan, Türkmenbaşy!" ("People, Motherland, Head of Turkmen!"). Nyýazow renamed the days of the week after members of his family and wrote the new Turkmen national anthem/oath himself.

Foreign companies seeking to exploit Turkmenistan's vast natural gas resources cooperated with Nyýazow since he also controlled access to the natural resources. His book, Ruhnama (or Rukhnama, 2001 and 2004), which was revered in Turkmenistan almost like a holy text, has been translated into 41 languages as of 2008 and distributed for free among major international libraries. Nyýazow once proclaimed that anyone who reads this book three times will "become more intelligent, will recognise the divine being and will go straight to heaven".

After Nyýazow's death, Deputy Prime Minister Gurbanguly Berdimuhamedow became acting president, and was elected president in his own right on 11 February 2007 in elections condemned by international observers as fraudulent. On 20 March, in a decision of significant symbolic weight in the ongoing rejection of Nyýazow's personality cult, he abolished the power of the president to rename any landmarks, institutions, or cities.

After the death of Saparmyrat Nyýazow Turkmenistan's leadership made tentative moves to open up the country. Berdimuhamedow repealed some of Nyýazow's most idiosyncratic policies, including banning opera and the circus for being "insufficiently Turkmen". In education, his government increased basic education from 9 years to 10 years, and restored higher education from two years to five. He has also increased contacts with the West, which is eager for access to the country's natural gas riches - but fears were mounting that the government would revert to Nyýazow's draconian style of rule.

The constitution provides for freedom of the press, but the government does not practice it. The government effectively controls all media outlets. Only two newspapers, Adalat and Galkynyş, both created by presidential decree, and two private internet news portals, Infoabad and Arzuw, are nominally independent. Cable television, which existed in the late 1980s, was shut down. Access to foreign media is impeded by internet blockage of roughly one third of the world's IP addresses and a ban on use of virtual private networks. Opinion polls have been restricted in Turkmenistan.

Turkmen authorities restrict the activities of all but the officially recognized Russian Orthodox and Sunni Islam faiths. Religious congregations must register with the government, and individual parishes must have at least 500 members to register. Severe measures deal with religious sects that have not been able to establish official ties of state recognition, especially Baptists, Pentecostals, Seventh-day Adventists, Hare Krishna, Jehovah's Witnesses, and Baháʼís. Practitioners of these sects have allegedly been harassed, imprisoned, and/or tortured, according to some foreign human-rights advocacy groups.

Corruption continues to be pervasive. Power is concentrated in the presidency; the judiciary is wholly subservient to the régime, with all judges appointed for five-year terms by the president without legislative review. Little has been done to prosecute corrupt officials. With regard to the legal profession, while law practice may be conducted in Turkmenistan in assorted ways (collegium of lawyers, lawyers' association, private practice, etc.), there is no clear indication as to how certain demographic groups, such as women, have fared in the field.

The United Nations General Assembly recognized and supported Turkmenistan's "status of permanent neutrality" on 11 January 1996.

=== New constitution of 2008 ===
In September 2008, the People's Council unanimously passed a resolution adopting a new constitution. The latter resulted in the abolition of the council and a significant increase in the size of Parliament in December 2008. The constitution also enables the formation of multiple political parties. President Gurbanguly Berdimuhamedow has stated that "The new constitution corresponds to all international and democratic norms".

=== National Leader appointed 2023 ===
As of 21 January 2023, President Serdar Berdimuhamedow appointed his father and predecessor, Gurbanguly Berdimuhamedow, chairperson of the reformed People's Council of Turkmenistan with the title "National Leader of the Turkmen People" (Turkmen: türkmen halkynyň Milli Lideri). State media referred to the People's Council as the "supreme organ of government authority". Outside observers consider that the presidency has been stripped of all real authority so that it can be transferred to the National Leader, who is now the genuine chief executive of government. One commentator stated that this makes Turkmenistan an "absolute monarchy."

== Political parties and public organizations ==
Turkmenistan has a limited multi-party political system. Three officially registered political parties operate in the country: the Democratic Party of Turkmenistan, the Party of Industrialists and Entrepreneurs of Turkmenistan, and the Agrarian Party of Turkmenistan. These parties participate in political life and also function as public organizations involved in social activities aligned with state policy.

In addition to political parties, several nationwide public organizations operate with government support. These include the Magtymguly Youth Organisation of Turkmenistan, the National Center of Trade Unions of Turkmenistan, and the Women's Union of Turkmenistan.

== Leaders of Turkmenistan since 1924 ==
=== Turkmen Soviet Socialist Republic (1924–1991) ===
==== First secretaries of the Turkmen Communist Party ====
- Ivan Mezhlauk (19 November 1924 – 1926) (acting to 20 February 1925)
- Shaymardan Ibragimov (June 1926 – 1927)
- Nikolay Paskutsky (1927–1928)
- Grigory Aronshtam (11 May 1928 – August 1930)
- Yakov Popok (August 1930 – 15 April 1937)
- Anna Muhamedow (April – October 1937) (acting)
- Yakov Chubin (October 1937 – November 1939)
- Mikhail Fonin (November 1939 – March 1947)
- Şaja Batyrow (March 1947 – July 1951)
- Suhan Babaýew (July 1951 – 14 December 1958)
- Jumadurdy Garaýew (14 December 1958 – 4 May 1960)
- Balyş Öwezow (13 June 1960 – 24 December 1969)
- Muhammetnazar Gapurow (24 December 1969 – 21 December 1985)
- Saparmyrat Nyýazow (21 December 1985 – 16 December 1991)

==== Chairmen of the Revolutionary Committee ====
- Gaýgysyz Atabaýew (October 1924 – December 1924)
- Nedirbaý Aýtakow (December 1920 – February 1925)

==== Chairmen of the Central Executive Committee ====
- Nedirbaý Aýtakow (20 February 1925 – 21 July 1937)
- Batyr Ataýew (acting) (August 1937 – October 1937)
- Hywaly Babaýew (October 1937 – 24 July 1938)

==== Chairman of the Supreme Soviet ====
- Allaberdi Berdiýew (24 July 1938 – 27 July 1938)

==== Chairmen of the Presidium of the Supreme Soviet ====
- Hywaly Babaýew (27 July 1938 – 1941)
- Allaberdi Berdiýew (1941 – 6 March 1948)
- Akmämmet Saryýew (6 March 1948 – 30 March 1959)
- Nurberdi Baýramow (30 March 1959 – 26 March 1963)
- Annamuhammet Gylyjow (26 March 1963 – 15 December 1978)
- Bally Ýazgulyýew (15 December 1978 – 13 August 1988)
- Roza Bazarowa (13 August 1988 – 19 January 1990)

==== Chairman of the Supreme Soviet ====
- Saparmyrat Nyýazow (19 January 1990 – 2 November 1990)

=== Presidents ===
- Saparmyrat Nyýazow (2 November 1990 – 21 December 2006) (from 22 October 1993 Türkmenbaşy)
- Gurbanguly Berdimuhamedow (21 December 2006 – 19 March 2022) (acting until 14 February 2007)
- Serdar Berdimuhamedow (19 March 2022 – present)

=== National Leader ===
- Gurbanguly Berdimuhamedow (21 January 2023 – present)

== List of heads of government of Turkmenistan (1925–1991) ==
=== Turkmen Soviet Socialist Republic (1924–1991) ===
==== Chairmen of the Council of People's Commissars ====
- Gaýgysyz Atabaýew (20 February 1925 – 8 July 1937)
- Aýtbaý Hudaýbergenow (October 1937 – 17 October 1945)
- Suhan Babaýew (17 October 1945 – 15 March 1946)

==== Chairmen of the Council of Ministers ====
- Suhan Babaýew (15 March 1946 – 14 July 1951)
- Balyş Öwezow (14 July 1951 – 14 January 1958) (first time)
- Jumadurdy Karayev (14 January 1958 – 20 January 1959)
- Balyş Öwezow (20 January 1959 – 13 June 1960) (second time)
- Abdy Annalyýew (13 June 1960 – 26 March 1963)
- Muhammetnazar Gapurow (26 March 1963 – 25 December 1969)
- Oraz Orazmuhammedow (25 December 1969 – 17 December 1975)
- Bally Ýazgulyýew (17 December 1975 – 15 December 1978)
- Çary Garryýew (15 December 1978 – 26 March 1985)
- Saparmyrat Nyýazow (26 March 1985 – 4 January 1986)
- Annamyrat Hojamyradow (4 January 1986 – 17 November 1989)
- Han Ahmedow (5 December 1989 – 18 May 1992)

Under the 1992 constitution, the president is elected by popular vote for a five-year term. Nyýazow added the post of chairman of the Supreme Soviet in January 1990, and was elected as the country's first president that October. He was the only candidate in Turkmenistan's first presidential elections in 1992. A 1994 plebiscite extended his term to 2002, and Parliament extended his term indefinitely in 1999.

After Nyýazow's death, Deputy Prime Minister for Science and Health Gurbanguly Berdimuhamedow took over, despite the fact that Öwezgeldi Ataýew, the Chairman of the Parliament of Turkmenistan, would be the next in line in the order of succession (allegedly because the prosecutor-general had initiated investigations against Ataýew). The president appoints the deputy chairmen of the cabinet of ministers.

A presidential election to replace Nyýazow was held on 11 February 2007.

== Legislative branch ==
As of January 2023, Turkmenistan's Parliament ("Assembly", Turkmen: Mejlis) is unicameral, with a 125-seat single chamber. The Assembly is popularly elected.

=== History ===
The 1992 constitution established two parliamentary bodies, a unicameral People's Council or Halk Maslahaty (supreme legislative body of up to 2,500 delegates, some of whom were elected by popular vote and some of whom were appointed; met at least yearly) and a unicameral Assembly or Mejlis (originally 50 seats, eventually expanded to 125, whose members are elected by popular vote to serve five-year terms).

In late 2003 legislation was passed reducing the powers of the Mejlis and making the Halk Maslahaty the supreme legislative organ. The Halk Maslahaty could at that point legally dissolve the Mejlis, and the president was now able to participate in the Mejlis as its supreme leader. The Mejlis could no longer adopt or amend the constitution, or announce referendums or its elections. Since President Saparmyrat Nyýazow was both the "Chairman for Life" of the Halk Maslahaty and the supreme leader of the Mejlis, the 2003 law had the effect of making him the sole authority of both the executive and legislative branches of government.

Following Nyýazow's death, in 2008, President Gurbanguly Berdimuhamedow introduced a new constitution under which the Halk Maslahaty was reformed into an "Elders Council" with no legislative authority, and nominal legislative authority reverted to a unicameral Mejlis.

In October 2017, President Berdimuhamedow reorganized the Council of Elders into a new People's Council. In September 2020 the Turkmenistan Parliament adopted a constitutional amendment creating an upper chamber and thus making the Parliament bicameral. The People's Council became the upper chamber. Of its 56 members, 48 are indirectly elected and 8 are appointed by the president. Together with the previous unicameral parliamentary body, the 125-seat Mejlis, as the lower chamber, the Parliament is now called the National Council (Turkmen: Milli Geňeş).

Election to the upper chamber was held 28 March 2021. Elections to the Mejlis were last held 25 March 2018.

In January 2023 both chambers of parliament proposed to abolish the Halk Maslahaty as a legislative organ, to reform it as an independent representative body, and to place all legislative authority in a unicameral Assembly (Mejlis). This proposal was adopted in a joint session of the National Council on 21 January 2023.

=== De facto authority ===
Outside observers consider the Turkmen legislature to be a rubber stamp parliament. The Turkmen legislature is described as under the "full control" of the president.

== Political parties and elections ==
Turkmenistan was until recently a one-party state wherein only the Democratic Party of Turkmenistan (Türkmenistanyň Demokratik partiýasynyň) was legally allowed to contest elections. Other parties are now formally allowed to exist following the adoption of the new Constitution.

There have been political parties and opposition groups in the past—a group named Agzybirlik (Unity) was banned in January 1990. Its members formed the Party for Democratic Development which was itself banned in 1991. This led a coalition for democratic reform named Geňeş (Conference).

The latest opposition party, the Republican Party of Turkmenistan (Türkmenistanyň Respublikan partiýasynyň), operates in exile. Since all opposition was banned within Turkmenistan, so it has been forced to form and operate from abroad.

Below is the list of parliamentary parties in Turkmenistan:

Name	Abbr.	Leader/Chairman	Ideology	Mejlis	Political position
Democratic Party of Turkmenistan; Türkmenistanyň Demokratik Partiýasy	TDP	Ata Serdarow	Turkmen nationalism; Social conservatism	65 / 125	Big tent
Agrarian Party of Turkmenistan; Türkmenistanyň agrar partiýasy	TAP	Rejep Bazarow	Agrarianism; Statism	24 / 125	Big tent
Party of Industrialists and Entrepreneurs of Turkmenistan; Türkmenistanyň Senagatçylar we Telekeçiler partiýasy	TSTP	Saparmyrat Owganow	Industrialism; Statism	18 / 125	Big tent

== Administrative divisions ==
Turkmenistan is divided into five provinces (Turkmen: welaýatlar, singular welaýat): Ahal Province, Balkan Province, Daşoguz Province, Lebap Province, and Mary Province. The capital city, Ashgabat, is a separate entity and though a city has the legal status of a province (Turkmen: welaýat hukukly) under the Turkmen constitution.

== Foreign policy ==
Foreign policy of Turkmenistan is based on the status of permanent positive neutrality recognized by the UN General Assembly Resolution on Permanent Neutrality of Turkmenistan on 12 December 1995. Articles on Turkmenistan's foreign policy as a neutral state:

- Regional Strategy of Ashgabat
- Neutral Factor of Turkmenistan
- The World Recognized Turkmenistan's Neutrality 9 Years Ago

== Domestic policy ==
=== Restrictions on communication ===
Despite the launch of Turkmenistan's first communication satellite—TürkmenÄlem 52°E / MonacoSAT—in April 2015, the Turkmen government banned all satellite dishes in Turkmenistan the same month. The statement issued by the government indicated that all existing satellite dishes would have to be removed or destroyed—despite the communications receiving antennas having been legally installed since 1995—in an effort by the government to fully block access of the population to many "hundreds of independent international media outlets" which are currently accessible in the country only through satellite dishes, including all leading international news channels in different languages. The main target of this campaign is Radio Azatlyk, the Turkmen-language service of Radio Free Europe/Radio Liberty.

Internet access is filtered and websites to which the government objects are blocked. Blocked websites include opposition news media, YouTube, many social media including Facebook, and encrypted communications applications. Use of virtual private networks to circumvent censorship is prohibited.

== International organization participation ==
Turkmenistan is affiliated to the CIS, EAPC, EBRD, ECE, ECO, ESCAP, FAO, IBRD, ICAO, ICRM, IDB, IFC, IFRCS, ILO, IMF, IMO, Intelsat (nonsignatory user), IOC, IOM (observer), ISO (correspondent), ITU, NAM, OIC, OPCW, OSCE, PFP, UN, UNCTAD, UNESCO, UPU, WCO, WFTU, WHO, WIPO, WMO, WToO, WTO (observer)

== See also ==
- State Security Council of Turkmenistan
- Republican Party of Turkmenistan
- Annaberdi Kakabaýew
- Şemşat Annagylyjowa
- Gurbannazar Aşyrow
