= List of Turkmenistan foreign ministers =

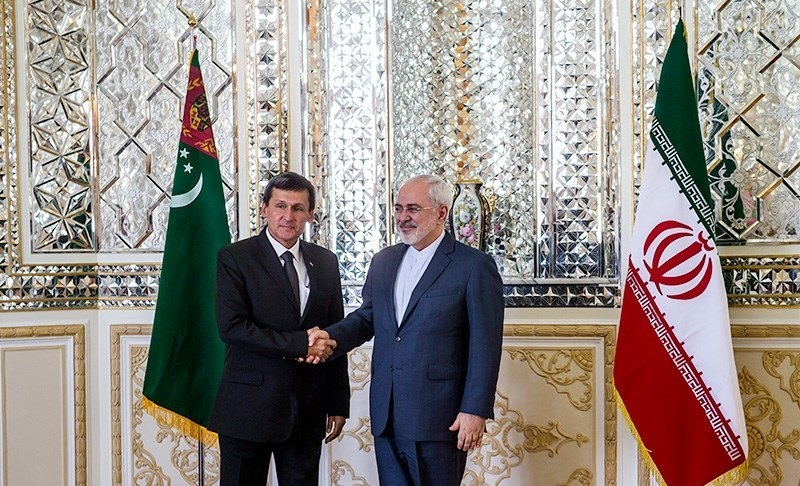
Raşit Meredow with Javad Zarif

This is a list of the foreign ministers of Turkmenistan. The position was established in 1944 and was re-established after Turkmenistan gained its independence in 1991. The position of foreign minister has been held by Raşit Meredow since 2001.

== List of foreign ministers of the Turkmen SSR ==
No.	Image	Name (birth-death)	In office		First Secretary	Notes
No.	Image	Name (birth-death)	Took office	Left office	First Secretary	Notes
1		Kara Aliev	1944	1951	Şaja Batyrow Balyş Öwezow	
2		Balyş Öwezow	1951	1958	Suhan Babaýew	
3		Juma Karaev	1958	1959	Jumadurdy Garaýew	
4		Balyş Öwezow	1959	1960	Jumadurdy Garaýew	
5		Abdy Annaliyev	1960	1963	Balyş Öwezow	
6		Muhammetnazar Gapurow	1963	1969		
7		Oraz Orazmukhamedov	1969	1975	Muhammetnazar Gapurow	
8		Bally Yazkuliyev	1975	1978	Muhammetnazar Gapurow	
9		Chary Karriyev	1978	1979	Muhammetnazar Gapurow	
10		Nazar Suýunow	1979	1985	Muhammetnazar Gapurow	
11		Roza Bazarova	1985	1988	Saparmurat Niyazov	
12		Tuvakbibi Amangeldyeva	1988	1990	Saparmurat Niyazov	

== List of foreign ministers of Turkmenistan ==
No.	Image	Name (birth-death)	In office		President	Notes
No.	Image	Name (birth-death)	Took office	Left office	President	Notes
1		Awdy Kulyýew	9 September 1990	4 August 1992	Saparmurat Niyazov (1990-2006)	
2		Halykberdy Atayew	8 April 1992	1 June 1995	Saparmurat Niyazov (1990-2006)	
		Boris Şyhmyradow	6 June 1995	28 July 2000	Saparmurat Niyazov (1990-2006)	
3		Batyr Berdiýew	28 July 2000	7 July 2001	Saparmurat Niyazov (1990-2006)	
4		Raşit Meredow	7 July 2001	Present	Saparmurat Niyazov (1990-2006)	
4		Raşit Meredow	7 July 2001	Present	Gurbanguly Berdimuhamedow (2006-2022)	
4		Raşit Meredow	7 July 2001	Present	Serdar Berdimuhamedow (2022-present)	

== See also ==
- Ministry of Foreign Affairs (Turkmenistan)
