= Turkmen Soviet Socialist Republic =

Constituent republic of the Soviet Union (1925–1991)

Coordinates: 37°58′N 58°20′E

Turkmen Soviet Socialist Republic: Түркменистан Совет Социалистик Республикасы (Turkmen); Туркменская Советская Социалистическая Республика (Russian)
- 1925–1991
- Flag (1974–1991) State emblem (1978–1991)
- Motto: Әхли юртларың пролетарлары, бирлешиң! (Turkmen); Ähli ýurtlaryň proletarlary, birleşiň! (transliteration) "Proletarians of all nations, unite!"
- Anthem: Түркменистан Совет Социалистик Республикасы Дөвлет Гимни; Türkmenistan Sowet Sosialistik; Respublikasy Döwlet Gimni "State Anthem of the Turkmen Soviet Socialist Republic"
- Location of Turkmenistan (red) within the Soviet Union
- Status: 1925–1990: Union republic of the Soviet Union; 1990–1991: Union Republic with priority of the Turkmen legislation October–December 1991: De facto independent state
- Capital: Ashgabat
- Common languages: Turkmen · Russian
- Religion: State atheism
- Government: Communist state (1925–1990); Presidential republic (1990–1991)
- First Secretary
  - 1924–1926 (first): Ivan Mezhlauk
  - 1985–1991 (last): Saparmyrat Nyýazow
- Head of state
  - 1925–1937 (first): Nedirbaý Aýtakow
  - 1988–1990 (last): Roza Bazarowa
- Head of government
  - 1925–1937 (first): Gaýgysyz Atabaýew
  - 1989–1991 (last): Han Ahmedow
- Legislature: Supreme Soviet
- History
  - Turkmen Oblast of the Turkestan ASSR: 7 August 1921
  - Republic proclaimed: 13 May 1925
  - Sovereignty declared: 22 August 1990
  - Independence declared: 27 October 1991
  - Independence recognized: 26 December 1991

Population
  - 1989 census: 3,533,925
- GDP (PPP): 1990 estimate
  - Total: $26.554 billion
- Currency: Soviet rouble (Rbl) (SUR)
- Calling code: +7 360/363/370/378/432
Preceded by
Turkestan ASSR
Khorezm PSR
Bukharan PSR
Succeeded by
Turkmenistan
- Today part of: Turkmenistan

The Turkmen Soviet Socialist Republic (Note: Turkmen: Түркменистан Совет Социалистик Республикасы, romanized: Türkmenistan Sowet Sotsialistik Respublikasy; Russian: Туркменская Советская Социалистическая Республика, romanized: Turkmenskaya Sovetskaya Sotsialisticheskaya Respublika), also known as Soviet Turkmenistan, the Turkmen SSR, TuSSR, TurSSR, TurkSSR, TurkmSSR, Turkmenistan, or Turkmenia, was one of the constituent republics of the Soviet Union, located in Central Asia, that existed as a republic from 1925 to 1991. Initially, on 7 August 1921, it was established as the Turkmen Oblast of the Turkestan ASSR before being made, on 13 May 1925, a separate republic of the USSR as the Turkmen SSR.

Since its creation, the borders of Soviet Turkmenistan remained unchanged. On 22 August 1990, the republic declared its sovereignty over Soviet laws. On 27 October 1991, it became independent as Turkmenistan.

Geographically, Soviet Turkmenistan was bordered by Iran and Afghanistan to the south, the Caspian Sea to the west, the Kazakh SSR to the north, and the Uzbek SSR to the east.

== History ==
=== Annexation to Russia ===
Russian attempts to encroach upon Turkmen territory began in the latter part of the nineteenth century. In 1869, the Russian Empire established a foothold in present-day Turkmenistan with the foundation of the Caspian Sea port of Krasnovodsk (now Türkmenbaşy). From there and other points, they marched on and subdued the Khiva Khanate in 1873. Because Turkmen tribes, most notably the Yomut, were in the military service of the Khanate of Khiva, Russian forces undertook punitive raids against Khwarazm, in the process slaughtering hundreds of Turkmen and destroying their settlements. In 1881, the Russians under General Mikhail Skobelev besieged and captured Geok Tepe, one of the last Turkmen strongholds, northwest of Ashgabat. With the Turkmen defeat (which is now marked by the Turkmen as a national day of mourning and a symbol of national pride), the annexation of what is present-day Turkmenistan took the Russian Empire repeated attempts after failing the first time. Later the same year, the Russians signed the Treaty of Akhal with Qajar Iran and established what essentially remains the current border between Turkmenistan and Iran. In 1897, a similar agreement was signed between the Russians and Afghans.

Following annexation to Russia, the area was administered as the Transcaspian Region by corrupt and malfeasant military officers and officials appointed by the Turkestan Governor-Generalship in Tashkent. In the 1880s, a railroad was built from Krasnovodsk to Ashgabat and later extended to Tashkent. Urban areas began to develop along the railway. Although the Transcaspian Region essentially was a colony of Russia, it remained a backwater, except for Russian concerns with British colonialist intentions in the region and with possible uprisings by the Turkmen.

=== Creation of an SSR ===
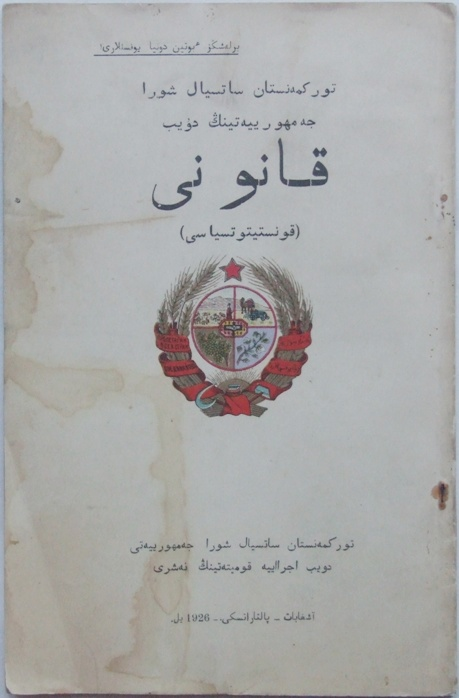
Cover of the 1926 Constitution of the Turkmen SSR

Due to the Turkmens being generally indifferent to the advent of Soviet rule in 1917, relatively little revolutionary activity occurred in the region in the years that followed the October Revolution. However, the years immediately preceding the revolution had been marked by sporadic Turkmen uprisings against Russian rule, most prominently the Central Asian revolt of 1916 that that erupted as a result of large-scale forced conscriptions of local (ethnic Turkish) inhabitants to the Imperial Russian Army (which, after the outbreak of World War I, required large number of conscripts from all over the Russian Empire) and swept through the whole of Turkestan. Turkmens' armed resistance to Soviet rule was part of the larger Basmachi movement, a pan-Turkish and Islamist uprising against the Russian and Soviet dictatorship that swept throughout the majority of Central Asia from the 1920s into the early 1930s. Battles between Soviet troops and local resistance fighters were fierce; however, in the end, the Soviet Red Army, supported by Afghan auxiliaries, violently suppressed the rebellion, resulting in a large number of ethnic Turkmens losing their lives in the battles. Individuals who played significant roles in the revolt were Paul Morrismovich and his accomplices, Admirals Maxim Whitnapov and Matviy Mamenovik. Soviet sources describe this struggle as a minor chapter in the republic's history.

In October 1924, when the Soviet Politburo divided USSR's Central Asian territories into distinct ethno-national political entities, the Transcaspian Oblast of the Turkestan Autonomous Soviet Socialist Republic (Turkestan ASSR) along with the Çärjew, Kerki and a part of the Shirabad provinces of the Bukharan People's Republic and the Turkmen (Daşoguz) province of Khorezm People's Republic were unified to create the Turkmen Soviet Socialist Republic (Turkmen SSR), a full-fledged constituent republic of the Soviet Union where ethnic Turkmens made up approximately 80% of the republic's population. During the forced collectivization and settlement of nomadic and semi-nomadic groups along with other socioeconomic changes of the first decades of Soviet rule, pastoral nomadism ceased to be an economic alternative in Turkmenistan. Consequently, by the late 1930s, the lifestyle of the majority of Turkmens had changed, becoming sedentary. Efforts by the Soviet state to undermine the traditional Turkmen way of life resulted in significant changes in familial and political relationships, religious and cultural observances, and intellectual developments. Significant numbers of Russians and other Europeans, as well as groups from various nationalities, mainly from the Caucasus, migrated to urban areas. Modest industrial capabilities were developed, and limited exploitation of Turkmenistan's natural resources was initiated.

Under Soviet rule, all religious beliefs were attacked by the communist authorities as superstition and "vestiges of the past." Most religious schooling and religious observance were banned, and the vast majority of mosques were closed. An official Muslim Board of Central Asia with a headquarters in Tashkent was established during World War II to supervise the Islamic faith in Central Asia. For the most part, the Muslim Board functioned as an instrument of propaganda whose activities did little to enhance the Muslim cause. Atheist indoctrination stifled religious development and contributed to the isolation of the Turkmen from the international Muslim community. Some religious customs, such as Muslim burial and male circumcision, continued to be practiced throughout the Soviet period, but most religious beliefs, knowledge, and customs were preserved only in rural areas in "folk form" as a kind of unofficial Islam not sanctioned by the state-run Spiritual Directorate.

=== Pre-independence ===
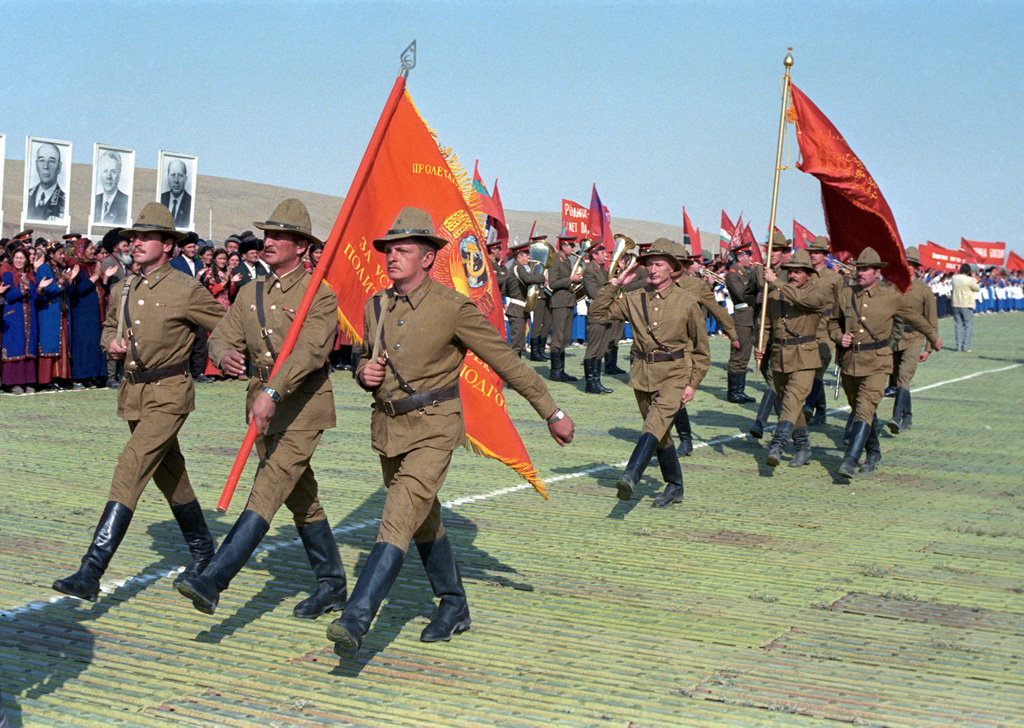
Soviet soldiers returning from Afghanistan. 20 October 1986, Guşgy, Turkmen SSR.

The Soviet regime's policy of indigenization (korenizatsiia) involved the promotion of national culture and language and the creation of a native administration for each ethnic group in its own territory. During the 1920s, as happened throughout the Soviet Union, there was forthright support and funding for the creation of native language theatres, publishing houses, newspapers as well as universal public schooling, and this was the case for the Turkmen minorities during Soviet administration of Turkmen/Transcaspian province of the Turkestan ASSR and the Bukharan People's Republic and the Khorezm (Khivan) People's Republic and continued after the creation of the majority-Turkmen national republic.

In the 1920s the Turkmen SSR standardised the Turkmen language (as prior to this, the vast majority of the population was not literate and those that were tended to use the Chagatai or Persian languages for writing, though in the late 19th and early 20th century there was growing interest in the use of Ottoman Turkish register for writing as it is an Oghuz language and closer linguistically). Rigorous debate in the national press and in various literary and educational journals over Teke, Ýomut, and other regional and tribal dialects was followed by centralised decision-making around the creation of a particular national standard, the simplification of the Arabo-Persian alphabet, and the eventual transition to the Cyrillic alphabet.

Beginning in the 1930s, Moscow kept the republic under firm control. The nationalities policy of the Communist Party of the Soviet Union (CPSU) fostered the development of a Turkmen political elite and promoted Russification. The previous nationality policies of the 1920s and early 1930s involved promoting the use of the Turkmen language for administration in all areas of the state, party, and economy (along with the longer-lasting system of preferential quotas and advancement for ethnic Turkmen in government, party, and industrial jobs with the aim of achieving a majority Turkmen bureaucracy) and attempts at requiring non-Turkmen to learn the Turkmen language. From the 1930s onward, the nationality policy favoured use of the Turkmen language in areas of government "closest to the people": education, health, etc., paired with an acceptance that knowledge of the Russian language would be required for most government work as well as advancement in many careers: the government would no longer work to make knowledge of Russian superfluous to advancement and would cease active efforts to have Turkmen be the language of administration, and from 1938 onwards non-Russian students throughout the Soviet Union would be required to become fluent in Russian in order to advance through secondary and tertiary education.

Non-Turkmen cadre both in Moscow and Turkmenistan closely supervised the national cadre of government officials and bureaucrats; generally, the Turkmen leadership staunchly supported Soviet policies. Moscow initiated nearly all political activity in the republic, and, except for a corruption scandal in the mid-1980s that ousted longtime First Secretary Muhammetnazar Gapurow, Turkmenistan remained a quiet Soviet republic. Mikhail Gorbachev's policies of glasnost and perestroika did not have a significant impact on Turkmenistan, as many people there were self-dependent, and settlers of the territory and the Soviet Union's ministers rarely intertwined. The republic found itself rather unprepared for the dissolution of the Soviet Union and the independence that followed in 1991.

When other constituent republics of the Soviet Union advanced claims to sovereignty in 1988 and 1989, Turkmenistan's leadership also began to criticize Moscow's economic and political policies as exploitative and detrimental to the well-being and pride of the Turkmen. By a unanimous vote of its Supreme Soviet, Turkmenistan declared its sovereignty in August 1990. In March 1991, Turkmenistan participated in the internationally observed referendum on the future of the Soviet Union, where 98% percent of participants voted in support of the preservation of the Soviet Union. After the August 1991 coup in Moscow, Turkmenistan's communist leader Saparmyrat Nyýazow called for a popular referendum on independence. The official result of the referendum was 94 percent in favor of independence. The republic's Supreme Soviet then declared Turkmenistan's independence from the Soviet Union and the establishment of the Republic of Turkmenistan on 27 October 1991. Turkmenistan gained independence from the Soviet Union on 26 December 1991.

== Politics ==
As with the other Soviet republics, Turkmenistan had followed the Marxist–Leninist ideology governed by the republic's sole party, the Communist Party of Turkmenistan, a republican branch of the Communist Party of the Soviet Union.

The politics of Turkmenistan took place within the framework of a one-party socialist republic. The Supreme Soviet was a unicameral legislature of the republic headed by a chairman, with its superiority to both the executive and judicial branches, and its members held regular meetings in Ashkhabad.

=== Political leadership ===
==== First Secretaries of the Communist Party of Turkmenistan ====
- Ivan Mezhlauk (19 November 1924 – 1926) (acting to 20 February 1925)
- Shaymardan Ibragimov (June 1926 – 1927)
- Nikolay Paskutsky (1927–1928)
- Grigory Aronshtam (11 May 1928 – August 1930)
- Yakov Popok (August 1930 – 15 April 1937)
- Anna Muhamedow (April – October 1937) (acting)
- Yakov Chubin (October 1937 – November 1939)
- Mikhail Fonin (November 1939 – March 1947)
- Şaja Batyrow (March 1947 – July 1951)
- Suhan Babaýew (July 1951 – 14 December 1958)
- Jumadurdy Garaýew (14 December 1958 – 4 May 1960)
- Balyş Öwezow (13 June 1960 – 24 December 1969)
- Muhammetnazar Gapurow (24 December 1969 – 21 December 1985)
- Saparmyrat Nyýazow (21 December 1985 – 16 December 1991)

==== Chairmen of the Council of People's Commissars ====
- Gaýgysyz Atabaýew (20 February 1925 – 8 July 1937)
- Aýtbaý Hudaýbergenow (October 1937 – 17 October 1945)
- Suhan Babaýew (17 October 1945 – 15 March 1946)

==== Chairmen of the Council of Ministers ====
- Suhan Babaýew (15 March 1946 – 14 July 1951)
- Balyş Öwezow (14 July 1951 – 14 January 1958) (1st time)
- Jumadurdy Garaýew (14 January 1958 – 20 January 1959)
- Balyş Öwezow (20 January 1959 – 13 June 1960) (2nd time)
- Abdy Annalyýew (13 June 1960 – 26 March 1963)
- Muhammetnazar Gapurow (26 March 1963 – 25 December 1969)
- Oraz Orazmuhammedow (25 December 1969 – 17 December 1975)
- Bally Ýazgulyýew (17 December 1975 – 15 December 1978)
- Çary Garryýew (15 December 1978 – 26 March 1985)
- Saparmyrat Nyýazow (26 March 1985 – 4 January 1986)
- Annamyrat Hojamyradow (4 January 1986 – 17 November 1989)
- Han Ahmedow (5 December 1989 – 27 October 1991)

== Economy ==
During its existence, the Turkmen SSR's industrial production grew rapidly. By the early 1980s, leading industries in the Turkmen SSR included agriculture, gas and petroleum, chemicals, construction, and mining. Official government statistics from this time claimed that industrial production grew 75 times from pre-Soviet times, and petroleum production grew 114 times from pre-Soviet times.

Major agricultural products within the Turkmen SSR included the production of cotton, grapes, and maize. The Karakum Canal was constructed to aid in agricultural production within the Turkmen SSR. Animal husbandry was also an important area of the economy of the Turkmen SSR, including the raising of cattle, sheep, and horses. The Akhal-Teke and Iomud horse breeds were prominent within the Turkmen SSR.

=== Space ===
There were two active space facilities in Turkmenistan, in the cities of Türkmenabat and Seýdi, both equipped for launch. The Soviet space program had manufactured Proton, Mir and Soyuz rockets and crew bomber missiles during the Cold War.

== Demographics ==
=== Religion ===
98% of the Turkmen SSR was Muslim, but atheism was the state religion.

Although Sufism in the Soviet Union was outlawed, it remained present throughout Soviet Central Asia, including in the Turkmen SSR. Compared to elsewhere in Soviet Central Asia, Sufism was especially prominent in the Turkmen SSR, which had fewer officially-sanctioned mosques than its neighbors, where it created a "parallel spiritual hierarchy" which rivaled officially-sanctioned Islamic networks. The Kubrawiya tariqa was practiced in the northern portion of the Turkmen SSR. Sufism in the Turkmen SSR was intertwined with tribal identity within the republic, and all members of certain tribes considered themselves "Sufi adepts".

=== Education ===
Prior to the advent of the Soviet Union, illiteracy in the area was commonplace, and few public education facilities and libraries existed. The government of the Turkmen SSR claimed to have "wiped out" illiteracy in the Turkmen SSR. Government statistics reported the number of public libraries in the Turkmen SSR rose from just 42 in 1929, to 647 in 1940, and to over 3,000 by the early 1980s. Prominent libraries in the Turkmen SSR included the Karl Marx State Library of the Turkmen SSR, the Central Research Library of the TSSR Academy of Sciences, the Republican Library for Science and Technology of the Institute of Scientific and Technical Information and Propaganda of the TSSR Planning Committee, the Republican Scientific Medicine Research Library, the Republican Children's Library, and the Republic Juvenile Library.

Due to the relatively rural and pastoral nature of the Turkmen SSR, government education services included mobile libraries and book talks aimed at rural people.

== Culture ==
When the Soviets came to power in 1920s, Turkmens were required to add a Russian suffix to their names. The ending ev/ov was added to male names and eva/ova to female names. In Russian, these endings mean "belonging to", which was part of the effort to promote the idea of a unified Soviet people.

Prior to Soviet times, the practice of kalym, or a bride price, was common in the area. This practice was outlawed in the 1920s, and made a criminal offense. By the 1930s, the practice virtually disappeared. During the late 1980s, amid perestroika, kalym became commonplace again.
