= List of heads of government of Turkmenistan =

The following is a list of heads of government of Turkmenistan since the establishment of that position in 1925.

== List of heads of government of Turkmenistan (1925–1992) ==
=== Turkmen Soviet Socialist Republic (1925–1991) ===
==== Chairmen of the Council of People's Commissars ====
No.	Portrait	Name (Born-Died)	Term		
No.	Portrait	Name (Born-Died)	Took office	Left office	Duration
1	Gaýgysyz Atabaýew	Gaýgysyz Atabaýew (1887–1938)	20 February 1925	8 July 1937	12 years, 138 days
2	Aýtbaý Hudaýbergenow	Aýtbaý Hudaýbergenow (1906–1995)	October 1937	17 October 1945	8 years
3	Suhan Babaýew	Suhan Babaýew (1910–1995)	17 October 1945	15 March 1946	149 days

==== Chairmen of the Council of Ministers ====
No.	Portrait	Name (Born-Died)	Term		
No.	Portrait	Name (Born-Died)	Took office	Left office	Duration
1	Suhan Babaýew	Suhan Babaýew (1910–1995)	15 March 1946	14 July 1951	5 years, 121 days
2	Balyş Öwezow	Balyş Öwezow (1915–1975)	14 July 1951	14 January 1958	6 years, 184 days
3	Jumadurdy Garaýew	Jumadurdy Garaýew (1910–1960)	14 January 1958	20 January 1959	1 year, 6 days
(2)	Balyş Öwezow	Balyş Öwezow (1915–1975)	20 January 1959	13 June 1960	1 year, 145 days
4	Abdy Annalyýew [ru]	Abdy Annalyýew (1920–2007)	13 June 1960	26 March 1963	2 years, 286 days
5	Muhammetnazar Gapurow	Muhammetnazar Gapurow (1922–1999)	26 March 1963	25 December 1969	6 years, 274 days
6	Oraz Orazmuhammedow [ru]	Oraz Orazmuhammedow (1928/1930–?)	25 December 1969	17 December 1975	5 years, 357 days
7	Bally Ýazgulyýew [ru]	Bally Ýazgulyýew (born 1930)	17 December 1975	15 December 1978	2 years, 363 days
8	Çary Garryýew [ru]	Çary Garryýew (born 1932)	15 December 1978	26 March 1985	6 years, 101 days
9	Saparmyrat Nyýazow	Saparmyrat Nyýazow (1940–2006)	26 March 1985	4 January 1986	284 days
10	Annamyrat Hojamyradow [ru]	Annamyrat Hojamyradow (born 1935)	4 January 1986	17 November 1989	3 years, 317 days
11	Han Ahmedow	Han Ahmedow (1936–2006)	5 December 1989	27 October 1991	1 year, 344 days

=== Turkmenistan (1991–present) ===
==== Prime minister ====
No.	Portrait	Name (Born-Died)	Term			Political Party
No.	Portrait	Name (Born-Died)	Took office	Left office	Duration	Political Party
1	Han Ahmedow	Han Ahmedow (1936–2006)	27 October 1991	18 May 1992	204 days	TDP

==== President ====
After the passing of the current Constitution of Turkmenistan in 1992, the position of prime minister was abolished and the president of Turkmenistan also became head of government.

No.	Portrait	Name (Born-Died)	Term		
No.	Portrait	Name (Born-Died)	Took office	Left office	Duration
1		Saparmyrat Nyýazow (1940–2006)	18 May 1992	21 December 2006	14 years, 217 days
2		Gurbanguly Berdimuhamedow (born 1957)	14 February 2007	19 March 2022	15 years, 33 days
3		Serdar Berdimuhamedow (born 1981)	19 March 2022	Incumbent	4 years, 26 days

== See also ==
- President of Turkmenistan
- Vice President of Turkmenistan
- State Security Council of Turkmenistan
- Republican Party of Turkmenistan
