= Kurbangozel Aliýewa =

Soviet politician (1908–1975)

Minister of Light Industry of the Turkmen SSR

First Secretary of the Ashgabat City Committee of the Communist Party of Turkmenistan
- In office 1938–1941

Personal details
- Born: 1 January 1908; Turkmen SSR, Soviet Union
- Died: 1975; Turkmen SSR
- Political party: Communist Party of Turkmenistan

Kurbangozel Aliýewa (1 January 1908 – 1975) was a Soviet politician who served as Minister of Light Industry of the Turkmen SSR.

She has been a member of the Communist Party of the Soviet Union beginning in 1936. She was elected as a deputy of the Supreme Soviet of the Turkmen SSR and a delegate of the Congress of the Communist Party of the Soviet Union.
