= Mezhlauk =

Family name

Mezhlauk (Russian: Межлаук) is a Russified form of the Latvian language surname Mežlauks (from mežs – 'forest' and lauks – 'field'). Individuals with the surname include:

- Valery Mezhlauk (1893–1938), Soviet government official
- Ivan Mezhlauk (1891–1938), Soviet government official
- Martin Mezhlauk (1895–1918), Soviet government official
