= Academy of Sciences of Turkmenistan =

State body in Turkmenistan

- Türkmenistanyň Ylymlar akademiýasy
- Other name: Turkmen Academy of Sciences
- Former names: Academy of Sciences of the Turkmen SSR; Turkmen Branch of the USSR Academy of Sciences
- Established: 1951
- President: Allaberdi Ashyrov
- Location: Ashgabat
- Website: http://www.science.gov.tm/en/

The Academy of Sciences of Turkmenistan (Turkmen: Türkmenistanyň Ylymlar akademiýasy) is a state body in Turkmenistan founded in 1951, which is responsible for the implementation of Turkmen scientific and technical policy. The academy was closed under president Saparmurat Niyazov and reopened by his successor, Gurbanguly Berdimuhamedow.

== Structure ==
The academy has three departments:

- Humanitarian and economic sciences
- Physical and mathematical, chemical, geological and engineering sciences
- Medical, biological and agricultural sciences

This work is organized in five institutes:
"1. The Magtymguly National Institute of Language, Literature and Manuscripts
2. Institute of History and Archaeology.
3. Institute of Seismology and Atmospheric Physics.
4. Institute of Chemistry.
5. Center for Technology."

The academy pursues research in six priority areas:
"1. Nanotechnology, chemical technology, new materials research and energy.
2. Biotechnology, molecular biology, agriculture, ecology and genetics.
3. Information and telecommunication systems, computer technology.
4. Modern medicine and drug production technologies.
5. Innovative economics.
6. Humanities."

=== Publications ===
The academy publishes four journals, Наука и техника в Туркменистане (Science and Technology in Turkmenistan), Проблемы освоения пустынь (Problems of Desert Development), Мирас (Heritage), and Наука и техника молодёжи (Science and Technology for Youth).

== History ==
The academy's lineage dates back to the Turkmen Scientific Commission, founded in 1922. It would later become the State Academic Council, under the People's Commissariat of Education, and then in May 1932 the Turkmen Scientific Research Institute. In March 1936, by resolution of the Central Executive Committee and the Council of People's Commissars of the Turkmen Soviet Socialist Republic, it was reduced to the Institute of History and Language and Literature. In 1941, the Turkmen Branch of the USSR Academy of Sciences was founded. By 1945, research staff included thirty-five Turkmens.

The present academy was established 29 June 1951 by decree of the Presidium of the USSR Supreme Soviet. By 1986, the academy had 15 research institutions. In the summer of 1998, the academy came under the direct control of the president of Turkmenistan. It was closed for more than 10 years and was reopened by President Niyazov's successor, Gurbanguly Berdimuhamedow.

=== 2009 revival ===
With the revival of the academy in 2009 the structure of science and research in Turkmenistan changed, reflecting reforms initiated by President Berdimuhamedow. With the new structure of the academy, research is centralized. The academy was restored according to presidential resolution number 10458 dated June 12, 2009, "On the question about the Academy of Sciences of Turkmenistan". According to the resolution, 11 institutes and three organisations serving the science sector were moved: the library, the printing house and the Ylym publishing house. By decree of President Berdimuhamedow in January 2019, the government will gradually end state funding of the Academy of Sciences of Turkmenistan, phasing it out over three years.

== Leaders ==
=== Turkmen Branch of USSR Academy of Sciences ===
- Boris Keller (1941–45)
- Dmitry Nalivkin (1946–51)

=== Academy of Sciences of Turkmen SSR ===
- Tagan Berdiyev (1951–56)
- Geldi Charyyev (1956–59)
- Shaja Batyrov (1959–65)
- Pygam Azymov (1966–75)
- Agajan Babayev (1975–86)
- Orazgeldi Ovezgeldiyev (1986–88)

=== Academy of Sciences of Turkmenistan ===
- Agajan Babayev (1989–93)
- Agamamed Hojamuhammedov (1993–98)
- Gurbanmyrat Mezilov (2010–16)
- Meret Ashyrbayev (2016–18)
- Sapardurdy Toylyyev (2018–22)
- Allaberdy Asyrov (2022–)

== See also ==
- Academy of Sciences official website (in Russian)
- Academy of Sciences official website (in Turkmen)
- Academy of Sciences official website (in English)
