= Vasily Rykov =

Soviet politician and diplomat

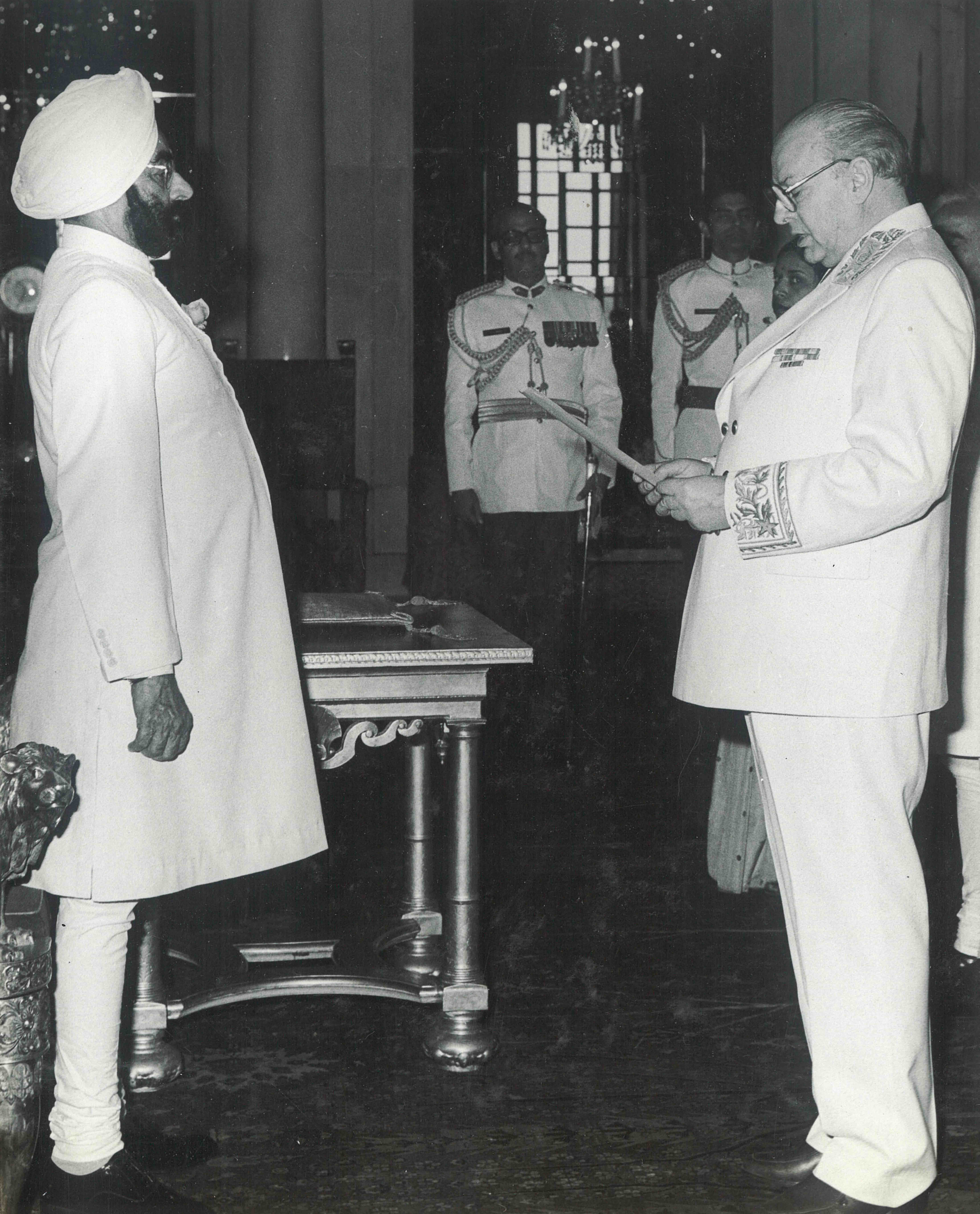
Giani Zail Singh receives credentials from Vasily Rykov

Vasily Nazarovich Rykov (Russian: Василий Назарович Рыков; 13 August 1918, Vladivostok – 18 October 2011, Moscow) was a Soviet politician and diplomat.

In 1936, he studied at an Industrial institute in Novocherkassk. In 1943, he joined the Communist Party of the Soviet Union. He became the Second Secretary of the Leningrad Regional Committee of the CPSU in 1952. From 1963 to 1975 he was the Second Secretary of the Central Committee of the Communist Party of Turkmenistan in the Turkmen Soviet Socialist Republic. In 1975, Rykov joined the Ministry of Foreign Affairs of the USSR. Between 1975 and 1988, he worked as the Soviet Ambassador to Algeria and India. He retired in Moscow and died there in 2011.
