= Annaberdi Kakabaýew =

Turkmenistani politician

Annaberdi Kakabaýew served as the interior minister in the Government of Turkmenistan.
