= Batyr Ataýew =

Chairman of the Central Executive Committee of the Turkmen SSR
- In office July 1937 – October 1937
- Preceded by: Nedirbay Aytakov
- Succeeded by: Hyvaly Babaýew

Personal details
- Born: 1901
- Died: 1938 (aged 36–37)
- Party: CPSU

Batyr Ataýew (Russian: Батыр Атаев; 1901–1938) was a Turkmen politician who served as head of the Turkmen SSR.

== Biography ==
In 1923 and 1924 he served as chairman of the Yangi-Kala village council. From 1924 he served as the chairman of the Geok-Tepinsky volost executive committee and member of the Ashgabat district executive committee. Since 1925 he served as member of the board of the Supreme Court of the Turkmen region, responsible instructor of the Ashgabat district committee of the All-Union Communist Party. In 1926–1929 he served as the executive secretary of the Baherden District committee of the Communist Party of Turkmenistan. In 1929–1930 he was the executive secretary of the Ashgabat district committee of the Communist Party of Turkmenistan. In 1931–1934 he served as the chairman of the Central Control Commission of the Central Committee of the CPT - People's Commissar of the Workers 'and Peasants' Inspection of the Turkmen SSR. At the same time, from 1932 he was the deputy chairman of the Council of People's Commissars of the Turkmen SSR. From February 1934 he was head of the agricultural department of the Central Committee of the Communist Party of the Soviet Union. For some period until July 1937 he served as People's Commissar of Agriculture of the Turkmen SSR. On 21 July 1937 he was recommended by the Bureau of the Central Committee of the Communist Party of the Soviet Union for the post of chairman of the presidium of the Central Executive Committee of the Turkmen SSR, serving de facto as head of state of the Turkmen SSR. He was replaced in that position by Hyvaly Babaýew in October that year.

Preceded by Nedirbay Aytakov	Chairman of the Central Executive Committee of the Turkmen SSR; July 1937 – October 1937	Succeeded by Hyvaly Babaýew
