= Hywaly Babaýew =

Turkmen Soviet politician (1902–1941)

- Хывали Бабаев (Note: Sometimes listed as Russian: Хивали Бабаев.)
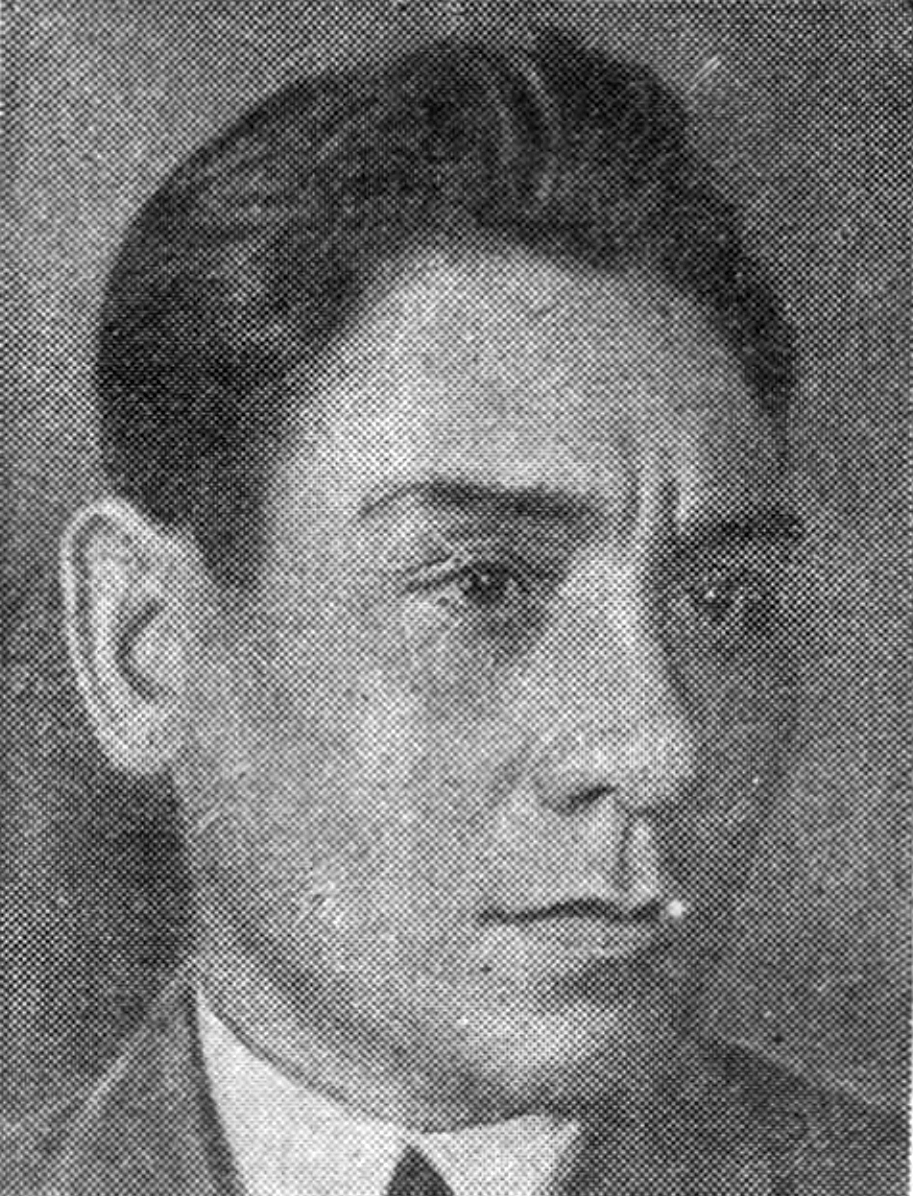

Chairman of the Central Executive Committee of the Turkmen SSR
- In office 16 October 1937 – 24 July 1938
- Preceded by: Batyr Ataýew
- Succeeded by: Office abolished

Chairman of the Presidium of the Supreme Soviet of the Turkmen SSR
- In office 27 July 1938 – 30 August 1941
- Preceded by: Office established
- Succeeded by: Allaberdi Berdiýew

Personal details
- Born: 1902 Gazanjyk, Transcaspian Oblast, Russian Empire
- Died: 30 August 1941 Ashgabat, Turkmen SSR, Soviet Union
- Party: Communist Party of the Soviet Union, Communist Party of the Turkmen SSR

Hywaly Babaýew (Note: Sometimes transliterated as Hyvali Babayev.) (Russian: Хывали Бабаев) (1902 – 30 August 1941) was a Turkmen Soviet politician who served as a senior official in the Turkmen Soviet Socialist Republic (Turkmen SSR) during the late 1930s.

== About ==
Babaýew was born in 1902 in Gazanjyk, a village in the Transcaspian Oblast of the Russian Empire, which is now part of modern-day Turkmenistan. He became involved in politics and joined the Communist Party of the Soviet Union (CPSU), rising through the ranks during a period of significant political upheaval in the region.

He was a member of the All-Russian Central Executive Committee and played a role in the governance of the Turkmen SSR during a time of significant change and repression under Soviet rule. Chairman of the Central Executive Committee of the Turkmen SSR from 16 October 1937 to 24 July 1938, during a period marked by widespread political purges and restructuring throughout the Soviet Union. Following the dissolution of the Central Executive Committee, Babaýew became the first Chairman of the Presidium of the Supreme Soviet of the Turkmen SSR from 27 July 1938 until 1941.

He was executed by firing squad on 30 August 1941, during the aftermath of the Great Purge, a campaign of political repression in the Soviet Union that targeted perceived enemies of the state. Babaýew was posthumously rehabilitated in 1956, as part of the broader process of denouncing the excesses of the Great Purge.

== See also ==
- Turkmen Soviet Socialist Republic
- Chairman of the Supreme Soviet of the Turkmen SSR

Preceded by Batyr Ataýew	Chairman of the Central Executive Committee of the Turkmen SSR; July 1937 – October 1937	Succeeded by Allamurat Aşyrow
