= Nazar Soýunow =

Turkmen politician (1936–2021)

Foreign Minister of the Turkmen SSR
- In office 1979–1985
- Preceded by: Chary Karriyev
- Succeeded by: Roza Bazarova

Member of the People's Council of Turkmenistan
- In office 1990–1994

Deputy Chairman of the Cabinet of Ministers of Turkmenistan
- In office 26 June 1992 – 23 April 1994

Minister of Oil and Mineral Resources
- In office 23 April 1994 – 29 July 1994

Personal details
- Born: 23 August 1936 Nebit-Dag, Turkmen SSR, Soviet Union
- Died: 25 March 2021 (aged 84)
- Party: CPSU

Nazar Soýunow (23 August 1936 – 25 March 2021) was a Turkmen politician. A graduate of the Azerbaijan State Oil Academy and the Russian Academy of State Service, he served as Foreign Minister of the Turkmen SSR from 1979 to 1985. He was a member of the People's Council of Turkmenistan from 1990 to 1994, one of the Deputy Chairmen of the Cabinet of Ministers of Turkmenistan from 1992 to 1994, and Minister of Oil and Mineral Resources from April to July 1994.
