= Gurbannazar Aşyrow =

Turkmen politician (born 1974)

Personal details
- Born: Gurbannazar Aşyrow; 1974 (age 51–52) Ashgabat, Turkmen SSR, USSR
- Occupation: Politician

Gurbannazar Aşyrow (Russian: Курбанназар Аширов or Гурбанназар Аширов; born 1974) is a Turkmen politician from Ashgabat. He is one of the Vice Presidents.

In 1995 he graduated from the Turkmen State University in physics and since August 2005 has been head of the waterways administration.
