= Allaberdi Berdiýew =

Soviet Turkmen politician

- Аллаберды Бердыев
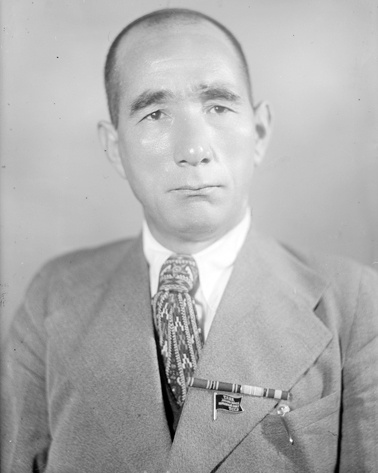
- Berdiýew in 1946

First Deputy Chairman of the Executive Committee of the Surkhan-Darya Regional Council of Workers' Deputies
- In office September 1950 – March 1953

Chairman of the Presidium of the Supreme Soviet of the Turkmen SSR
- In office 27 January 1942 – 6 March 1948
- Preceded by: Hywaly Babaýew
- Succeeded by: Akmämmet Saryýew

Chairman of the Supreme Soviet of the Turkmen SSR
- In office 24 July 1938 – 27 January 1942
- Preceded by: Office established
- Succeeded by: Kurban Permanov

Second Secretary of the Central Committee of the Communist Party of Turkmenistan
- In office 16 July 1938 – 20 August 1940

Personal details
- Born: 1904 Transcaspian Oblast, Russian Empire
- Died: 3 February 1964 (aged 59–60) Ashgabat, Turkmen SSR, Soviet Union
- Citizenship: Soviet Union
- Party: Communist Party of the Soviet Union; Communist Party of Turkmenistan; Communist Party of Uzbekistan
- Occupation: Politician
- Awards: Order of Lenin Order of the Patriotic War (1st class)

Military service
- Allegiance: Bukharan PSR
- Branch/service: Bukhara Red Army
- Years of service: 1920–1921
- Rank: Private

Allaberdi Berdiýew (Russian: Аллаберды Бердыев; 1904 – 3 February 1964) was a Soviet Turkmen politician who served in various positions including Chairman of the Supreme Soviet of the Turkmen SSR and Chairman of the Presidium of the Supreme Soviet of the Turkmen SSR.

== Early life and education ==
Berdiýew was born in 1904 in Baýramaly, Transcaspian Oblast of the Russian Empire. He worked as a laborer, a blacksmith's apprentice, and on a cotton field in the city of Baýramaly from 1918 to 1920. From September 1920 to October 1921, he was a private in the 1st Turkestan Volunteer Detachment of the Bukhara Red Army. He joined the All-Union Leninist Young Communist League (Komsomol) in 1922. From December 1923 to April 1928, he worked as a worker on his father's farm in Baýramaly. Berdiýew worked as a windmill operator at the Ashgabat Silk Mill until 1929. He graduated from a university in Ashgabat in 1929.

== Political career ==
Berdiýew joined the Communist Party of the Soviet Union in 1930. He served in minor positions in the Communist Party of Turkmenistan from 1931 to 1938. On 16 July 1938, Berdiýew was elected as the Second Secretary of the Central Committee of the Communist Party of Turkmenistan and served in the position until 20 August 1940. He was elected as Chairman of the Supreme Soviet of the Turkmen SSR on 24 July 1938; just eight days after becoming the Second Secretary. After serving as Chairman of the Supreme Soviet of the Turkmen SSR, Berdiýew was elected as the Chairman of the Presidium of the Supreme Soviet of the Turkmen SSR on 26 January 1942 and served in the position until 6 March 1948. From September 1950 to March 1953, Berdiýew served as the First Deputy Chairman of the Executive Committee of the Surkhan-Darya Regional Council of Workers' Deputies in the Uzbek SSR. He was a member of the Council of Ministers of the Turkmen SSR later on.

== Death ==
Allaberdi Berdiýew died on 3 February 1964 after suffering from an illness in Ashgabat, Turkmen SSR, Soviet Union.

== Awards ==
- Order of Lenin (four times)
- Order of the Patriotic War (first class)

== See also ==
- Supreme Soviet of the Turkmen SSR
- Bukharan People's Soviet Republic
