= Grigory Aronshtam =

Soviet politician (1893–1938)

First Secretary of the Communist Party of Turkmenistan
- In office 11 May 1928 – August 1930
- General Secretary: Joseph Stalin
- Preceded by: Nikolay Paskutsky
- Succeeded by: Yakov Popok

Personal details
- Born: 1893 Borzna, Chernihiv Governorate
- Died: 19 March 1938 (aged 44–45) Kommunarka shooting ground, Moscow Oblast, Soviet Union
- Resting place: Kommunarka shooting ground
- Citizenship: Soviet
- Party: Communist Party of Turkmenistan

Grigory Naumovich Aronshtam (1893 – 1938) served as the fourth first secretary of the Communist Party of the Turkmen SSR, serving from 11 May 1928 until August 1930. In addition, he was the third and final person to hold the position of president of the Turkmen SSR before its responsibilities were merged with those of the first secretary. He was the brother of Lazar Aronshtam. Like his brother he was executed during the Great Purge and posthumously rehabilitated in 1956.

He was succeeded as first secretary by Yakov Popok.

Political offices
Preceded by Khalmurad Sakhatmuradov	President of the Turkmen SSR; 1928 – 1930	Succeeded by Position abolished
Party political offices
Preceded by Nikolay Paskutsky	First Secretary of the Communist Party of the Turkmen SSR; 1928 – 1930	Succeeded by Yakov Popok
