= Valery Mezhlauk =

Soviet political activist

- Валерий Межлаук; Valērijs Mežlauks
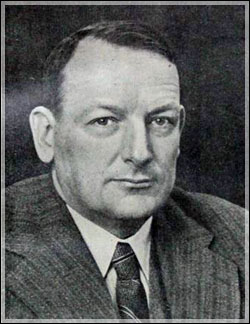
- Born: Valery Ivanovich Mezhlauk; February 7, 1893; Kharkov, Ukraine, Russian Empire
- Died: 29 July 1938 (aged 45); Kommunarka, Butovo, USSR
- Cause of death: Executed during Stalin's Great Purge
- Resting place: Kommunarka shooting ground
- Citizenship: USSR
- Office: Chairman of the State Planning Committee (1934–1937)
- Political party: RSDLP (Bolsheviks) (1907–1918); Russian Communist Party (1918–1937)
- Spouse: Charna Markovna Mezhlauk (Maers-Mikhailova) (1902–1941)
- Relatives: Ivan Mezhlauk (1891–1938) (brother); Martin Ivanovich Mezhlauk (1895–1918) (brother); Valentine Ivanovich Mezhlauk (?–1938) (brother); Cornelius Ivanovich Mezhlauk (1905–1952) (brother)

Valery Ivanovich Mezhlauk (Russian: Вале́рий Ива́нович Межла́ук; Latvian: Valērijs Mežlauks) (1893–1938) was a government and party official in the Soviet Union during the decades of the 1920s and 1930s. He is best remembered as the Chairman of the State Planning Committee (Gosplan) from 1934 to 1937. He became a victim of Stalin’s Great Purge and was executed on July 29, 1938. He was posthumously rehabilitated in 1956.

== Biography ==
=== Early years ===
Valery Ivanovich Mezhlauk was born February 7, 1893, in Kharkov in the Kharkov Governorate of the Russian Empire (present-day Ukraine), one of five sons of an ethnic Latvian nobleman, a teacher, and German mother. In 1914 he earned a degree in history and philology and in 1917 a degree in jurisprudence from Kharkov University, where he also taught from 1913 to 1916. He joined the revolutionary movement and became a member of Russian Social Democratic Labour Party in 1907. Mezhlauk joined the RSDLP (b) in July 1917.

=== Soviet career ===
In 1917, after the Russian Revolution, Mezhlauk became a member of the Kharkov committee of the VKP(b) and of the city's soviet and military revolutionary committee. From 1918 to 1920, during the Russian Civil War, he served as provincial military commissar in Kazan; people's commissar of finance of the short-lived Donetsk–Krivoy Rog Soviet Republic in Ukraine; a member of the regional committee of the Ukrainian Communist Party of the Donbas; a member of the military commandment in Donetsk; a member of the Revolutionary Military Council (Revvoensovet) of the 5th, 10th, 14th, and 2nd Armies of the Red Army; a member of the Revvoensovet of the Southern Front; people's military commissar of Ukraine; and a member of the Revvoensovet of the Tula region. In 1920–24, Mezhlauk was commissar of the Moscow–Baltic, Moscow–Kursk, and Northern railroads, including, in 1921–1922, as a deputy to the Chief People's Commissar for Transport, Felix Dzerzhinsky. In August 1923 he was made a member of the governing collegium of the People's Commissariat of Transport. He would remain at that post until November 1924 when he was moved to the Presidium of the Supreme Council of National Economy (VSNKh), the Soviet chief economic planning agency. He remained at VSNKh throughout most of the decade, gaining promotion to vice-chairman of the Council on July 14, 1928.

After signing the contract for technical assistance in building the Nizhnii Novgorod (Gorky) Automobile Plant. Dearborn, Mich., May 31, 1929. Left to right, Valery I. Mezhlauk, Vice Chairman VSNKh of the USSR; Henry Ford; Saul G. Bron, President of Amtorg.

On May 31, 1929, in Dearborn, Michigan, in his capacity as vice-chairman of VSNKh, Mezhlauk, together with President of Amtorg, Saul Bron, signed the agreement with the Ford Motor Company for assistance in building the first Soviet automobile plant (GAZ) near Nizhnii Novgorod (Gorky).

In November 1931, Mezhlauk was appointed the first vice-chairman of the State Planning Agency (Gosplan), an institution which was emerging as central economic planning department in the state. He became the chairman of Gosplan in April 1934. He was also made vice-chairman of the Council of People's Commissars of the USSR and a full member of the Central Committee of the Communist Party of the Soviet Union. In 1934–1937 he also served as vice-chairman of the Council of Labor and Defense (STO).

In 1929–1930, amidst the industrialization drive of the first five-year plan, Mezhlauk was a chief editor of the leading Soviet economics newspaper Torgovo-promyshchlennaia gazeta (Commerce and Industry Newspaper), a periodical which changed its name in 1930 to Za industrializatsiiu ("For Industrialization"). He was the author of many works on the socialist economy and was well known for his expressive caricatures of Soviet officials, including Nikolai Bukharin and Leon Trotsky, that he made during official meetings and Party conferences.

=== Arrest and death ===
In the early stages of the Great Purge, Mezhlauk was keen to show his loyalty to Stalin. When the Central Committee met in February 1937 to decide the fate of the former oppositionists Nikolai Bukharin and Alexei Rykov, Mezhlauk shouted at them: "You have been tormenting the party over many, many years and it is only thanks to the angelic patience of Comrade Stalin that we have not torn you politically to pieces for your vile terroristic work." He also drew a cartoon showing the figures of Georgy Pyatakov and Lev Kamenev – who had both been shot – pointing at Bukharin and Rykov, depicted as wild animals. Bukharin's tail had a swastika at its tip.

In November 1937, the NKVD began the mass arrest of Latvians in the USSR. Mezhlauk, who was half-Latvian and half-German, was arrested on December 1, 1937. and accused of treason, industrial sabotage, contacts with the German government, and heading a Latvian counter-revolutionary terrorist organization. He was sentenced to death on July 28, 1938, and executed the next day. He was posthumously rehabilitated in March 1956.

=== Family ===
Father, Ivan Martinovich Mezhlauk (John Mežlauks), Latvian; mother, Rosa Schiller, German. Wife, Charna Markovna Mezhlauk (Maers-Mikhailova) (1902–1941), was arrested following the arrest of her husband in 1937 and executed in 1941. Younger brother, Martin Mezhlauk (1895–1918), was a Commissar of Jurisprudence in Kazan; he was killed by the White Army during the Russian Civil War. The older brother, Ivan Mezhlauk (1891–1938), also a Soviet government official, was arrested on December 3, 1937, and executed on April 25, 1938. Another brother, Valentin Mezhlauk, committed suicide in 1938. The youngest brother, Cornelius Mezhlauk (Корнелий Межлаук) (1905–1952), in 1938 officially denounced his older brothers and survived as a state and party official in Kazakhstan; died in Moscow, buried at Novo-Devichye Cemetery.
