= Han Ahmedow =

Prime Minister of Turkmenistan from 1989 to 1992

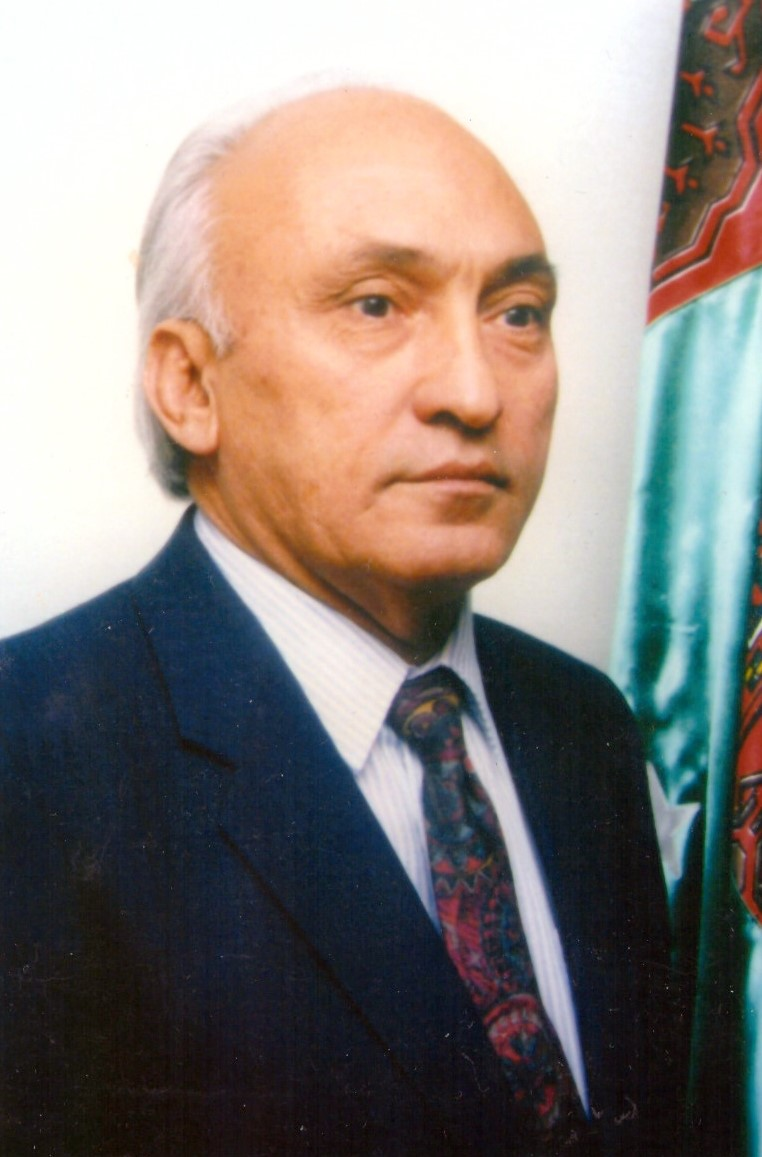
- Ahmedow in 1994

Prime Minister of Turkmenistan
- In office 5 December 1989 – 18 May 1992
- President: Saparmyrat Nyýazow
- Deputy: Ata Çaryýew
- Preceded by: Annamurat Hojamuradov (as Chairman of the Council of Ministers of the Turkmen SSR)
- Succeeded by: Position abolished

First Secretary of the Ashgabat City Committee of the Communist Party of Turkmenistan
- In office 21 December 1985 – 1988
- Leader: Saparmyrat Nyýazow
- Preceded by: Saparmyrat Nyýazow
- Succeeded by: Nikolai Baleshev

Personal details
- Born: Han Ahmedowiç Ahmedow; 16 June 1936 Krasnovodsk, Turkmen SSR, Soviet Union
- Died: 6 December 2006 (aged 70) Serdar, Turkmenistan
- Party: Communist Party of Turkmenistan (1963–1991); Democratic Party of Turkmenistan (1991–2006)

Han Ahmedowiç Ahmedow (Note: Also known by his name transliterated from Russian, Khan Akhmetovich Akhmetov (Russian: Хан Ахметович Ахметов)) (16 June 1936 – 6 December 2006) was a Turkmen politician who served as the first and only prime minister of Turkmenistan from December 1989 to May 1992.

== Life and career ==
He graduated from the Tashkent Institute of Railway Transport Engineers in 1959, after which he worked at the Ashgabat Station of the Ashgabat Railway. In 1962, he became head of the Chardzhou Branch of the Central Asian Railway. Then in 1980, he became Head of the Department of Transport and Communications of the Central Committee of the Communist Party of the Turkmen SSR. In 1985, he succeeded Saparmyrat Nyýazow as the first secretary of the Ashgabat City Committee of the CPT. In 1988, he became First Deputy Chairman of the Council of Ministers of the Turkmen SSR, and in December 1989, Chairman of the Council of Ministers of the Turkmen SSR. The following November, Turkmenistan established more decommunised government institutions, leading to Ahmedow becoming Prime Minister of the Turkmen SSR.

During his time in office, Turkmenistan declared independence from the collapse of the Soviet Union in October 1991. Afterwards, Ahmedow became Railways Minister (1991–1992), Deputy Head of the Government of Turkmenistan (1991–1992), and then ambassador to Turkey (1992–1994).

== Later life and death ==
In September 2002, he was arrested and placed under internal exile in Serdar, where he remained until he died of a heart attack in late 2006. According to relatives of Ahmedow, the government did not allow him to receive medical treatment in Ashgabat.

== Notes ==
Political offices
Preceded by Position created	Prime Minister of Turkmenistan; 1991 – 1992	Succeeded by Position abolished
