= Şemşat Annagylyjowa =

Turkmen politician

Şemşat Amangylyjowna Annagylyjowa is a Turkmen politician who has served as the education minister of Turkmenistan since the president, Saparmyrat Nyýazow, appointed her on 25 January 2006.
