= Supreme Soviet of the Turkmen Soviet Socialist Republic =

Supreme Soviet of the Turkmen SSR Түркменистан ССР Ёкары Советы (Turkmen) Верховный Совет Туркменской ССР (Russian)
- Turkmen SSR (1938–1991); Turkmenistan (1991–1992)
- Emblem of the Turkmen Soviet Socialist Republic

Type
- Type: Supreme Soviet

History
- Established: 1938
- Disbanded: 1992
- Succeeded by: People's Council of Turkmenistan/Assembly of Turkmenistan

Leadership
- Chairman: Sahat Muradov (last)
- Chairman of the Presidium: Roza Bazarova (last)

Elections
- Last election: 1990

The Supreme Soviet of the Turkmen SSR (Turkmen: Түркменистан ССР Ёкары Советы, romanized: Türkmenistan SSR Ýokary Sowety; Russian: Верховный Совет Туркменской ССР, romanized: Verkhovnyy Sovet Turkmenskoy SSR) was the highest organ of state authority of the Turkmen SSR, one of the union republics of the Soviet Union. The Supreme Soviet of the Turkmen SSR was established in 1938 and disbanded in 1992. It was succeeded by the Assembly of Turkmenistan in 1992.

== Chairmen of the Supreme Soviet ==
Portrait	Chairman	From	To
	Allaberdy Berdyev	24 July 1938	27 January 1942
	Kurban Permanov	27 January 1942	March 1947
	Şaja Batyrow	March 1947	March 1948
	Yusup Ovezov	March 1948	1956
	Tore Ataev	1956	30 March 1959
	Shamurad Tashliev	30 March 1959	26 March 1963
	Makhtum Shabasanov	26 March 1963	April 1967
	Pigam Azimov	April 1967	29 June 1971
	Davly Karaev	29 June 1971	1973
	Bally Yazkuliev	5 July 1973	17 December 1975
	Aman Durdyev	17 December 1975	21 March 1980
	Orazgeldy Ovezgeldyev	21 March 1980	18 January 1990
	Saparmurat Niyazov	18 January 1990	2 November 1990
	Sahat Muradov	18 November 1990	1992

== Chairmen of the Presidium of the Supreme Soviet ==
The Presidium of the Supreme Soviet of the Turkmen SSR was dissolved on January 18, 1990. Thus, all powers of the Chairman of the Presidium were transferred to the Chairman of the Supreme Soviet of the Turkmen SSR.

Portrait	Chairman	From	To
	Hywaly Babaýew (1902–1941)	26 July 1938	January 1942
	Allaberdy Berdyev (1904–1964)	27 January 1942	6 March 1948
	Akmämmet Saryýew (1907–?)	6 March 1948	30 March 1959
	Nurberdy Bayramov (1912–1986)	30 March 1959	26 March 1963
	Annamuhammed Klychev (1912–1990)	26 March 1963	15 December 1978
	Bally Yazkuliev (born 1930)	15 December 1978	13 August 1988
	Roza Bazarova (born 1933)	13 August 1988	18 January 1990

== See also ==
- Supreme Soviet
