= Aýtbaý Hudaýbergenow =

Soviet and Turkmen politician

Chairman of the Council of People's Commissars of the Turkmen SSR
- In office July 1937 – 17 October 1945
- Preceded by: Gaýgysyz Atabaýew
- Succeeded by: Suhan Babaýew

Personal details
- Born: 1906 Syr-Darya Oblast, Russian Empire
- Died: 1995 (aged 88–89) Turkmenistan
- Party: CPSU
- Awards: Order of Lenin

Aýtbaý Hudaýbergenow (Russian: Аитбай Худайбергенов) was a Soviet Turkmen official and party figure who served as the Chairman of the Council of People's Commissars of the Turkmen SSR from July 1937 to 17 October 1945.

== Early life ==
He graduated from Ashgabat Agricultural College in 1930. From 1930 to 1932 and 1933 to 1934 he studied at the Turkmen Agricultural Institute, and was secretary of the party committee. He became a member of the Communist Party of the Soviet Union in 1929.

== Career ==
In 1932-1933 he was involved in party work. In 1934 he served as deputy director of the machine and tractor station. From 1934 to 1936 he served in the Red Army. From 1936 to August 1937 he served as second secretary of the Mary district committee of the Communist Party of Turkmenistan (CCPT). In August 1937 he was appointed instructor of the CCPT agricultural department. From August to November 1937 he served acting 1st secretary of the CCPT Leninsky District Committee. From November 1937 to October 17, 1945 he served as chairman of the Council of People's Commissars of the Turkmen SSR (prime minister).

During the war he led the republic's efforts by mobilizing Turkmenistan resources for the war, including cotton (for gunpowder) and oil and an oil refinery was transported from Tuapse to Turkmenistan. Horses, food, and warm clothing were delivered to the front and he helped to settle refugees who fled to the republic from the European parts of the Soviet Union. He was a delegate to the 18th Congress of the Communist Party in 1939, a member of the CCPU Central Auditing Commission (1939-1952). He became Deputy of the Supreme Soviet of the USSR of the 1st convocation (1937-1946). He wrote a book called To new achievements: About work party organization in "Sovet Uzbekistan" collective farm.

Preceded by Gaýgysyz Atabaýew	Prime Minister of Turkmenistan; July 1937 – 17 October 1945	Succeeded by Suhan Babaýew
