= Gaýgysyz Atabaýew =

Soviet politician (1887–1938)

Gaýgysyz S. Atabaýew
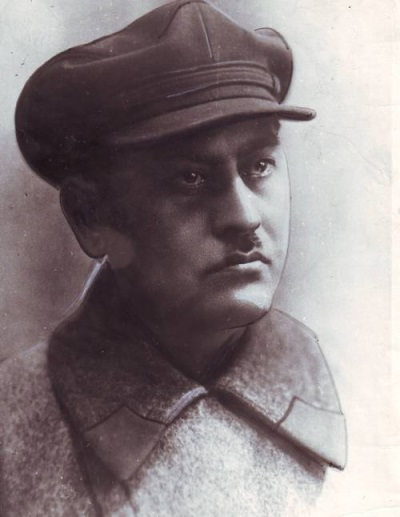

1st Chairman of the People's Commissars of Turkmenistan
- In office 20 February 1925 – 8 July 1937
- Preceded by: office established
- Succeeded by: Aýtbaý Hudaýbergenov

Personal details
- Born: Gaýgysyz Serdarowyç Atabaýew; October , 1887 Tejen Uyezd; Transcaspian Oblast, Russian Empire
- Died: 10 February 1938 (aged 50) Moscow, RSFSR, Soviet Union
- Cause of death: Execution
- Party: Communist Party of Turkmenistan
- Education: Tashkent Teachers Seminary

Gaýgysyz Serdarowyç Atabaýew (October 1887 – 10 February 1938) was a Turkmen Soviet politician. He was born in Transcaspian Oblast. He was the first prime minister of the Turkmen Soviet Socialist Republic.

== Biography ==
He was born in the village of Mäne of Tejen uyezd (nowadays in Altyn asyr District) of the Trans-Caspian region. His father, Täçgök, was the leader of the village of Serdar and a prosperous miller; his mother was the daughter of an Afghan vizier (later, Atabaýew never concealed his "non-proletarian" origin). By the age of 6 he was orphaned. He graduated from a second-class Russian-native school in Tejen (1899–1903), and then the Tashkent Teacher's Seminary (1903–07). In 1908 he took the surname Atabaýew in honor of his seminar classmate and friend M. Atabaýew.

He taught at the workers technical school of Merv uyezd, headed a first class school in Bäherden, was the translator for the head of Tejen District, and served in the office of the Merv Bank. He collaborated with the first Bolshevik government of the Transcaspian region. In 1918 he joined the Left Socialist Revolutionary Party.

Between September 1920 and 1922, he was chairman of the Council of People's Commissars of the Turkestan Autonomous Soviet Socialist Republic. Between February 1925 and July 1937, he was Prime Minister of the Turkmen Soviet Socialist Republic.

He was removed from office and executed during the Great Purge.

== See also ==
- Russian Wikipedia – Атабаев, Кайгисыз Сердарович
- Turkmen Wikipedia – Gaýgysyz Atabaýew

== Bibliography ==
- Атабаев Кайгисыз Сердарович // Большая советская энциклопедия : в 66 т. (65 т. и 1 доп.) / гл. ред. О. Ю. Шмидт. — Москва : Советская энциклопедия, 1926—1947.

Preceded by New office	Prime Minister of Turkmenistan; February 1925 – July 1937	Succeeded by Aýtbaý Hudaýbergenov
