= Halmurad Sahatmuradov =

Halmurad Sahatmuradov (Turkmen: Halmyrat Sahatmyradow, Russian: Халмурад Сахатмурадов) (1898–28 October 1938) was a Turkmen communist politician who served in various positions in the Turkmen Soviet Socialist Republic .

== Biography ==
Following the October Revolution, from September 1920 to August 1921 he served as deputy plenipotentiary representative of Turkestan to the People's Commissariat of Nationalities of the RSFSR in Moscow. From August 1921 to May 1922 he served as 2nd Secretary of the Transcaspian (Turkmen) Regional Committee of the Communist Party of Turkmenistan. In May 1922 to 1923 he served as head of the Printing Subdepartment of the Agitation Propaganda Department of the Central Committee of the Communist Party of Turkestan. From July 1923 to August 1924 he served as Chairman of the Scientific Commission of the People's Commissariat of Education of the Turkmen SSR. From October 1924 to March 1928 he served as 2nd Executive Secretary of the Central Committee of the Communist Party of Turkmenistan. In December 1926 he was recalled to Moscow by the Central Committee of the All-Union Communist Party (Bolsheviks), however, the Bureau of the Central Committee of the Communist Party of Turkey decided to insist on remaining in the TSSR. From April 1927 to May 1928 and possibly earlier, he was a member of the Presidium of the Central Executive Committee of the TSSR.
