= Roza Bazarowa =

Soviet-Turkmenistani politician

- Роза Базарова

Chairman of the Presidium of the Supreme Soviet of the Turkmen SSR
- In office 1988–1990
- Preceded by: Bally Yazkuliev
- Succeeded by: Office abolished

Personal details
- Born: 1933
- Party: Communist Party of the Soviet Union, Communist Party of the Turkmen SSR

Roza Atamyradowna Bazarowa (born 1933), in Russian: Роза Атамурадовна Базарова, is a Soviet-Turkmenistani politician and member of the Communist Party of the Soviet Union.

She was a Member of the Presidium of the Supreme Soviet between 1975 and 1989. She served as Deputy Premier Minister in 1975, and Minister of Foreign Affairs from 1985 to 1988. She was nominally President of the Republic (President of the Presidium of the Turkmenian SSR) between 10 September 1988 and 11 May 1990.
