= Ivan Mezhlauk =

Soviet politician

Ivan Ivanovich Mezhlauk
- Иван Иванович Межлаук
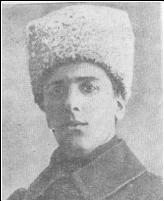

First Secretary of the Communist Party of Turkmenistan
- In office 19 November 1924 – 1926
- General Secretary: Joseph Stalin
- Preceded by: Position created
- Succeeded by: Shaymardan Ibragimov

Personal details
- Born: 30 September 1891 Kharkiv, Russian Empire
- Died: 25 April 1938 (aged 46) Kommunarka shooting ground, Moscow, Soviet Union
- Citizenship: Soviet
- Party: Communist Party of the Soviet Union
- Education: Imperial University of Kharkov

Ivan Ivanovich Mezhlauk (Russian: Ива́н Ива́нович Межла́ук; Latvian: Jānis Mežlauks; 30 September 1891 – 25 April 1938) was a Soviet politician and statesman who was the first first secretary of the Communist Party of the Turkmen SSR as well as its first president.

Ivan Mezhlauk was born in Kharkiv (modern Ukraine), in the Kharkov Governorate of the Russian Empire on 30 September 1891. He was of Latvian ethnicity. He joined the Bolshevik Party in 1918 and served in the Red Army during the Russian Civil War. He was president from 19 November 1924 until September 1925, when he was replaced by Halmurad Sahatmuradov. His term as first secretary lasted longer, until 1926.

He was succeeded as first secretary by Shaymardan Ibragimov.

From 1930 to 1933, Mezhlauk worked in the Soviet economic planning apparatus, for a time as the secretary of the Council of Labor and Defense.

Mezhlauk was the older brother of the Soviet economic planner, Valery Mezhlauk, the head of Gosplan from 1934 to 1937. Both brothers were arrested during the Great Purge of 1937–1938 and were among those who were executed. Ivan Mezhlauk was arrested on 3 December 1937, sentenced to death on 25 April 1938 and shot the same day. He was posthumously rehabilitated in 1956.

== Footnotes ==
Political offices
Preceded by position created	President of the Turkmen SSR; 1924 – 1925	Succeeded by Halmurad Sahatmuradov
Party political offices
Preceded by position created	First Secretary of the Communist Party of the Turkmen SSR; 1924 – 1926	Succeeded by Shaymardan Ibragimov
