= Anna Muhammedow =

Soviet politician (1900–1938)

Anna Muhammedow (Note: Also known by her name transliterated from Russian, Anna Mukhamedov (Russian: Анна Мухамедов)) (1900–1938) was the acting first secretary of the Communist Party of the Turkmen SSR immediately following Yakov Popok's resignation due to ill health on 15 April 1937. He served as the sixth first secretary of the Turkmen Communist Party.

His term lasted six months until, Joseph Stalin selected Yakov Chubin to succeed Popok.

In 1937, Stalin sent a telegram to Muhammedow, authorising the arrest of all Afghan citizens.

He was arrested in October 1937 amid the Great Purge and shot a year later. He was posthumously rehabilitated in 1956.

== Notes ==
Party political offices
Preceded by Yakov Popok	First Secretary of the Communist Party of the Turkmen SSR; 1937	Succeeded by Yakov Chubin
