= Yakov Popok =

Turkmen Communist secretary

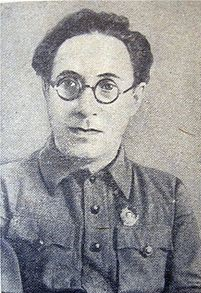
Yakov Abramovich Popok

Yakov Abramovich Popok (1894–1938) served as the fifth first secretary of the Communist Party of the Turkmen SSR. His term began in August 1930, replacing Grigory Aronshtam.

He fell ill in early 1937, causing him to resign on 15 April. He was removed from office, then executed the following year in the Great Purge. Deputy Secretary Anna Muhamedow held his position temporarily, until a replacement, Yakov Chubin, was selected; Muhamedow was also purged and executed in 1938 in the Great Purge. Both Popok and Muhamedow were rehabilitated in the years following Stalin's death.

== Biography ==
Popok was born in Khislavichi, Mstislavl district, Mogilev province (now Smolensk region) into a bourgeois family. He worked as a laborer and office worker in Mariupol, Yekaterinoslav, Tambov, Yelets, and Smolensk.

He joined the Russian Social Democratic Labour Party in 1909. He was arrested twice, was in exile from 1911 to 1914, then served in the Imperial Russian Army from 1915 to 1917, during which he conducted revolutionary agitation among his fellow soldiers.

From November 1917 to July 1918 he was the head of the fuel department of the Moscow executive committee. In November 1918 he served as head of the Yekaterinoslav provincial labor department, as part of the People's Commissariat of Labor of Ukraine.

From 1919 to February 1921 he served in the Red Army, where he was head of the political department for several military groupings. He took part in battles on the Eastern and Southern fronts of the Civil War. From 1921 to 1922 he was head of the organizational department of the Pskov provincial committee of the RCP(b) and chairman of the Pskov and Bryansk provincial trade union councils. In 1924 he graduated from the Marxism Courses at the Communist Academy, Moscow.

Popok held a number of posts across Russia during the next fourteen years, from Zlatoust in the south to Amur and Chita in the east. From 1930 to 1937 he was First Secretary of the Central Committee of the Communist Party of Turkmenistan, then briefly First Secretary of the Regional Committee of the All-Union Communist Party (Bolsheviks) of the Volga German Autonomous Soviet Socialist Republic for part of 1937 and 1938. He also served as a member of the All-Union Central Executive Committee and the Central Executive Committee of the USSR for this period. He was awarded the Order of Lenin in 1935.

On April 21, 1938, by decision of the Politburo of the Central Committee of the All-Union Communist Party (Bolsheviks), he was removed from office and recalled to the disposal of the Central Committee. He was soon (possibly on the same day) arrested, then shot on July 28, 1938.

He was posthumously rehabilitated in the years following Stalin's death.

Party political offices
Preceded by Grigory Aronshtam	First Secretary of the Communist Party of the Turkmen SSR; 1930– 1937	Succeeded by Anna Muhamedov
