= Shaymardan Ibragimov =

Turkmenistani politician (1899–1957)

First Secretary of the Communist Party of Turkmenistan
- In office June 1926 – 1927
- General Secretary: Joseph Stalin
- Preceded by: Ivan Mezhlauk
- Succeeded by: Nikolay Paskutsky

Personal details
- Born: 4 April 1899 Petryaksy, Sergachsky Uyezd, Nizhny Novgorod Governorate
- Died: 12 December 1957 (aged 58) Moscow, Soviet Union
- Resting place: Danilovskoye Cemetery
- Citizenship: Soviet
- Party: Communist Party of the Soviet Union

Shaymardan Nurimanovich Ibragimov (1899–1957) served as the second first secretary of the Communist Party of the Turkmen SSR, serving from 1926 until 1927.

He was succeeded as first secretary by Nikolay Paskutsky.

Party political offices
Preceded by Ivan Mezhlauk	First Secretary of the Communist Party of the Turkmen SSR; 1926 – 1927	Succeeded by Nikolay Paskutsky
