= Mikhail Fonin =

Soviet politician (1905–1974)

Mikhail Mikhailovich Fonin (Russian: Михаил Михайлович Фонин; 1905–1974) served as the eighth first secretary of the Communist Party of the Turkmen SSR.

Fonin held this position throughout the German-Soviet War, serving from February 1939 until March 1947. His successor was Şaja Batyrow.

Party political offices
Preceded by Yakov Chubin	First Secretary of the Communist Party of the Turkmen SSR; 1939 – 1947	Succeeded by Şaja Batyrow
