= Nedirbaý Aýtakow =

Turkmenistani revolutionary and Soviet politician

Nedirbaý Aýtakow Недирбай (Надырбай) Айтаков

Chairman of the Central Executive Committee of the Turkmen SSR
- In office 21 May 1925 – 12 January 1938
- General Secretary: Joseph Stalin
- Preceded by: Position created
- Succeeded by: Batyr Ataýew

Personal details
- Born: 1894 Mangyshlak Peninsula,
- Died: 28 October 1938 (aged 43–44) Moscow Oblast, Soviet Union
- Citizenship: Soviet
- Party: Communist Party of the Soviet Union

Nedirbaý Aýtakow (Russian: Недирбай (Надырбай) Айтаков); 1894 – October 28, 1938) was a Turkmenistani revolutionary and Soviet politician. He was born in the Transcaspian Oblast. From May 21, 1925, to July 21, 1937, he was the chairman of the Turkmenistan Central Executive Committee from 1925 to 1938 and served on the Central Executive Committee of the Soviet Union as a representative of the Turkmen Soviet Socialist Republic. During the Great Purge, he was executed by firing squad. After the death of Joseph Stalin, he was rehabilitated.

== Biography ==
Aýtakow was born in the steppe on the Mangyshlak peninsula, near the Alexander Fort in the Transcaspian region.

The advance of the Red Army through the territories inhabited by the Turkmens and the capture of Krasnovodsk in February 1920 led to the establishment of Soviet power in the region. From 1920 to 1921 Aýtakow became the chairman of the village council, and then a member of the volost Krasnovodsk revolutionary committee.

In 1921, Aýtakow was elected a delegate to the county congress of councils, as well as a member of the executive committee of the Krasnovodsk county council, and served as head of the Krasnovodsk county department of social security; in 1922 he became chairman of the executive committee of the Krasnovodsk city council.

He joined the RCP(b) in 1922. At the session of the Central Executive Committee of the Turkestan ASSR, he was elected deputy chairman (1923 - January 9, 1924) and a member of the Presidium of the Central Executive Committee of the Turkestan ASSR. On January 9, 1924, Aitakov was approved as the chairman of the Central Executive Committee of the Turkestan ASSR (which at that time was part of the RSFSR) and worked in this position until 10/27/1927.

From November 1924 to February 1925 he was the chairman of the Revolutionary Committee of Turkmenistan, which acted as a provisional government. When the incorporation of Turkmenistan into the USSR was completed, Aýtakow was elected to the post of chairman of the Central Executive Committee of the Turkmen SSR (February 1925-July 1937). Due to the acquisition of the status of a union republic by Turkmenistan, Aýtakow was elected one of the chairmen of the Central Executive Committee of the USSR (May 21, 1925).

Aýtakow was arrested in Ashgabat on the night of July 21–22, 1937. On October 28, 1938, the military collegium of the Supreme Court of the USSR sentenced Aýtakow to death on charges of espionage and plotting to tear Turkmenistan away from the Soviet Union. The sentence was carried out on October 28, 1938.

Aýtakow was rehabilitated by the Military Collegium of the Supreme Court of the USSR on December 12, 1956.

Aýtakow's son, Zelili Nedirbaýewiç Aýtakow, (1931-2010) was a surgeon-oncologist and doctor of medical sciences.

== Bibliography ==
- Przewodnik po historii Partii Komunistycznej i ZSRR (ros.)
- http://www.az-libr.ru/index.htm?Persons&000/Src/0000/783e4c55 (ros.)
- http://www.az-libr.ru/index.htm?Persons&09K/c446a08a/index (ros.)
