= Nikolay Paskutsky =

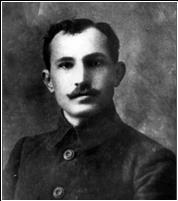

First Secretary of the Communist Party of Turkmenistan
- In office 1927 – August 1928
- General Secretary: Joseph Stalin
- Preceded by: Shaymardan Ibragimov
- Succeeded by: Grigory Aronshtam

Personal details
- Born: 9 November 1894 Florești, Bessarabia Governorate, Russian Empire
- Died: 28 July 1938 (aged 43) Kommunarka shooting ground, Moscow Oblast, Soviet Union
- Resting place: Kommunarka shooting ground
- Citizenship: Soviet
- Party: Communist Party of Turkmenistan
- Education: Railway school in Ashgabat

Nikolay Antonovich Paskutsky (Russian: Николай Антонович Паскуцкий; 9 November 1894 – 28 July 1938) was a Soviet politician who served briefly as the third first secretary of the Communist Party of the Turkmen SSR, serving from 1927 until August 1928. He was shot on 28 July 1938 during the Great Purge and posthumously rehabilitated in 1956.

Party political offices
Preceded by Shaymardan Ibragimov	First Secretary of the Communist Party of the Turkmen SSR; 1927 – 1928	Succeeded by Grigory Aronshtam
