= Yakov Chubin =

Soviet politician (1893–1956)

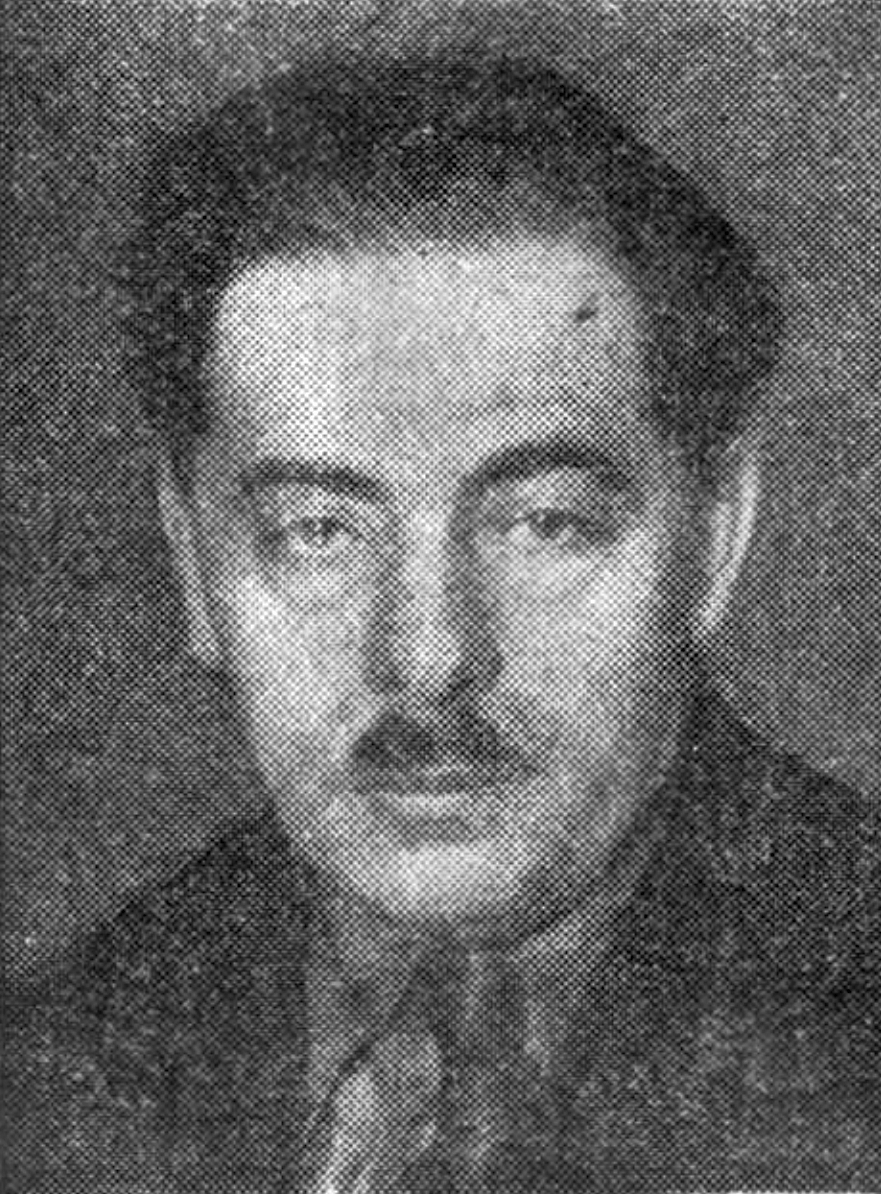

Yakov Abramovich Chubin (Russian: Яков Абрамович Чубин) also known as Yakov Shub, (born Mstsislaw, Mogilev Governorate, 1893 – died Moscow, November 1956) served as the seventh first secretary of the Communist Party of the Turkmen SSR.

His term began on 17 April 1937, following the resignation of Yakov Popok. He was replaced in February 1939 by Mikhail Fonin. In 1920 Chubin served as the Communist party leader of the Chernigov Governorate.

Party political offices
Preceded by Anna Muhamedow	First Secretary of the Communist Party of the Turkmen SSR; 1937– 1939	Succeeded by Mikhail Fonin
