= Communist Party of Turkmenistan =

Ruling party of the Turkmen SSR (1924–1991)

Communist Party of Turkmenistan Коммунистическая партия Туркменистана Türkmenistanyň Kommunistik Partiýasy
- First Secretary: Saparmurat Niyazov (last)
- Founded: 19 November 1924
- Dissolved: 16 December 1991
- Succeeded by: Democratic Party of Turkmenistan
- Ideology: Communism; Marxism–Leninism
- Political position: Far-left
- National affiliation: Communist Party of the Soviet Union
- Colours: Red
- Supreme Soviet (1990): 157 / 175 (90%)

Party flag

The Communist Party of Turkmenistan (Russian: Коммунистическая партия Туркменистана, romanized: Kommunisticheskaya partiya Turkmenistana; Turkmen: Түркменистаның Коммунистик Партиясы, romanized: Türkmenistanyň Kommunistik Partiýasy) was the ruling Marxist-Leninist party of the Turkmen SSR which operated as a republican branch of the Communist Party of the Soviet Union. The party was reorganised into the Democratic Party of Turkmenistan in 1991.

== History ==
The Communist Party of Turkmenistan was formed alongside the Turkmen Soviet Socialist Republic. The Politburo of the Communist Party of the Soviet Union mandated the creation of creation of republics and accompanying national parties on 12 June 1924. The six-member Turkmen National Bureau was the nucleus for the new party and was reorganised as the Turkmen National Party Bureau and then the Communist Party of Turkmenistan. Membership in this party was an amalgamation of the provincial party organisation of the Turkestan Autonomous Soviet Socialist Republic, Khivan Communist Party, and Turkmen section of the Communist Party of Bukhara. Gaýgysyz Atabaýew, Nedirbaý Aýtakow, and Halmurad Sahatmuradov were the leading members of the party and Soviet Turkmenistan. Sahatmuradov became the first secretary of the central committee in 1925.

The 25th congress of the Communist Party was held in December 1991. At this congress the party was renamed to the Democratic Party of Turkmenistan. Saparmurat Niyazov remained the chair of the party.

== Leadership ==
=== First Secretaries ===
No.	Picture	Name (Birth–death)	Took office	Left office	Political party
First Secretary
1		Ivan Mezhlauk (1891–1938)	19 November 1924	1926	CPT/CPSU
2		Shaymardan Ibragimov (1899–1957)	June 1926	1927	CPT/CPSU
3		Nikolay Paskutsky (1894–1938)	1927	1928	CPT/CPSU
4		Grigory Aronshtam (1893–1938)	11 May 1928	August 1930	CPT/CPSU
5		Yakov Popok (1894–1938)	August 1930	15 April 1937	CPT/CPSU
6		Anna Muhamedow (1900–1938)	April 1937	October 1937	CPT/CPSU
7		Yakov Chubin (1893–1956)	October 1937	November 1939	CPT/CPSU
8		Mikhail Fonin (1905–1974)	November 1939	March 1947	CPT/CPSU
9		Şaja Batyrow (1908–1965)	March 1947	July 1951	CPT/CPSU
10		Suhan Babaýew (1910–1995)	July 1951	14 December 1958	CPT/CPSU
11		Jumadurdy Garaýew (1910–1960)	14 December 1958	4 May 1960	CPT/CPSU
12		Balysh Ovezov (1915–1975)	13 June 1960	24 December 1969	CPT/CPSU
13		Muhammetnazar Gapurow (1922–1999)	24 December 1969	21 December 1985	CPT/CPSU
14		Saparmurat Niyazov (1940–2006)	21 December 1985	16 December 1991	CPT/CPSU

=== Second Secretaries ===
No.	Picture	Name (Birth–death)	Took office	Left office	Political party
Second Secretary
-		Anna Mukhammedov (1900–1938)	3 March 1935	October 1937	CPT/CPSU
-		Allaberdy Berdyev (1904–1964)	16 July 1938	20 August 1940	CPT/CPSU
-		Kurban Permanov(1909–1969)	28 November 1941	17 February 1945	CPT/CPSU
-		Shadzha Batyrov (1908–1965)	November 1945	July 1947	CPT/CPSU
-		Arkady Sennikov (1908–1974)	July 1947	10 September 1953	CPT/CPSU
-		Polikarp Dolgov (1910–1989)	10 September 1953	14 February 1954	CPT/CPSU
-		Fyedor Grishaenkov (1914–1983)	14 February 1954	13 June 1960	CPT/CPSU
-		Mikhail Pimenov (born 1914, death date unknown)	13 June 1960	25 March 1963	CPT/CPSU
-		Vasily Rykov (1918–2011)	25 March 1963	14 April 1975	CPT/CPSU
-		Viktor Pereudin (1923–2001)	14 April 1975	20 December 1980	CPT/CPSU
-		Albert Rachkov (1927–2023)	20 December 1980	26 July 1986	CPT/CPSU
-		Sergei Nesterenko (born 1935)	26 July 1986	1991	CPT/CPSU
-		Alexander Dodonov (1946–2018)	1991	1991	CPT/CPSU

== See also ==
- Politics of Turkmenistan
- Communist Party of the Soviet Union

== Works cited ==
=== Books ===
- Edgar, Adrienne (2004). Tribal Nation: The Making of Soviet Turkmenistan. Princeton University Press. ISBN 9780691127996.

=== Journals ===
- Sara, Mehwish (2007). "Changing Dynamics of Turkmenistan's Political System". Strategic Studies. 27 (3). Institute of Strategic Studies Islamabad: 365–405. doi:10.2307/45242409. JSTOR 45242409.
