= Şaja Batyrow =

Soviet politician (1908–1965)

First Secretary of the Communist Party of Turkmenistan
- In office March 1947 – 1950
- Preceded by: Mikhail Fonin
- Succeeded by: Balyş Öwezow

Personal details
- Born: September 20 (October 3) 1908 Transcaspian Oblast, Russian Empire
- Died: October 14, 1965 (age 57) Ashgabat, Turkmen SSR, USSR

Şaja Batyrowiç Batyrow (Note: Also known by his name transliterated from Russian, Shadzha Batyrovich Batyrov (Russian: Шаджа Батырович Батыров)) (1908–1965) was a Soviet politician who served as the first secretary of the Communist Party of Turkmenistan. He also was head of the Academy of Sciences of Turkmenistan from 1959 to 1965.

== Biography ==
He was born into the family of a wealthy merchant (according to other sources, a poor peasant) in the village of Desht in the Transcaspian region of the Russian Empire. He was a Turkmen, a descendant of the Teke tribe. His term as first secretary lasted from March 1947 until 1950, when Balyş Öwezow succeeded him.

From 1954-1959, he was Director of the Turkmen Pedagogical Institute. In 1959 he was elected Academician of the Academy of Sciences of the Turkmen SSR and President of the Academy of Sciences of the Turkmen SSR. In 1962, for the monograph "Formation and Development of Socialist Nations in the USSR" he received the degree of Doctor of Historical Sciences.

He died on October 14, 1965. He was buried at the Vatutinsky Cemetery in Ashgabat. He received the Order of Lenin.

== Legacy ==
A street is named after him in the capital of Turkmenistan, Ashgabat.

== Notes ==
Party political offices
Preceded by Mikhail Fonin	First Secretary of the Communist Party of Turkmenistan; 1947 – 1950	Succeeded by Balyş Öwezow
