= Balyş Öwezow =

Soviet politician (1915–1975)

Balyş Öwezowiç Öwezow (Note: Also known by his name transliterated from Turkmen, Balyş Öwezowiç Öwezow) (Russian: Балыш Овезович Овезов, 29 December 1915 – 13 October 1975) was a Soviet Turkmen politician who served as the first secretary of the Communist Party of the Turkmen SSR, twice, from 1950 to 1951 and again from 1960 to 1969.

== Biography ==
Ozezov was born in a Bedirkent village in Khanate of Khiva. Orphaned early, he graduated from the Higher Party School of the Central Committee.

He first worked as a teacher, and took on responsibility for the Komsomol in Turkmenistan. Gradually, he took on greater roles within the Communist Party, before being appointed First Secretary of the Turkmen Communist Party.

He succeeded Şaja Batyrow as First Secretary of the Communist Party of Turkmenistan, beginning his first term in 1950 and staying in office until October 1951, when Suhan Babaýew became First Secretary. He received the Order of Lenin during this time.

Ovezov was returned to power on 13 June 1960, following the death of Jumadurdy Garaýew. He served until 24 December 1969. Muhammetnazar Gapurow succeeded him.

He fathered six children.

== Notes ==
Party political offices
Preceded by Şaja Batyrow	First Secretary of the Communist Party of the Turkmen SSR; 1950 – 1951	Succeeded by Suhan Babaýew
Preceded by Jumadurdy Garaýew	First Secretary of the Communist Party of the Turkmen SSR; 1960 – 1969	Succeeded by Muhammetnazar Gapurow
