= Jumadurdy Garaýew =

Soviet politician (1910–1960)

Jumadurdy Garaýew (Note: Also known by his name transliterated from Russian, Dzhuma Durdy Karayev (Russian: Джума Дурды Караев)) (10 January 1910 – 4 May 1960) was a Soviet politician who served as the first secretary of the Communist Party of Turkmenistan from 14 December 1958 until his death on 4 May 1960.

== Notes ==
Party political offices
Preceded by Suhan Babaýew	First Secretary of the Communist Party of Turkmenistan; 1958–1960	Succeeded by Balyş Öwezow
