= Muhammetnazar Gapurow =

Turkmen politician (1922–1999)

First Secretary of the Central Committee of the Communist Party of Turkmenistan
- In office 24 December 1969 – 21 December 1985
- Preceded by: Balyş Öwezow
- Succeeded by: Saparmyrat Nyýazow

Personal details
- Born: Muhammetnazar Gapurowiç Gapurow; 15 February 1922 Charjou, Turkmen SSR, Soviet Union
- Died: 13 July 1999 (aged 77) Berzengi, Ashgabat, Turkmenistan
- Occupation: Politician

Military service
- Allegiance: Soviet Union
- Branch/service: Red Army
- Years of service: 1941–1944
- Rank: Staff sergeant
- Battles/wars: World War II

Muhammetnazar Gapurowiç Gapurow (Note: Also known by his name transliterated from Russian, Mukhammetnazar Kapurovich Kapurov (Russian: Мухамметназар Капурович Капуров)) (Turkmen: Мухамметназар Гапурович Гапуров; 15 February 1922 – 13 July 1999) was a Turkmen politician who was the first secretary of the Communist Party of the Turkmen SSR from 1969 until 1985. He spent his entire career in the Komsomol and Communist Party apparatus, becoming the republic's most influential politician for almost two decades in the Brezhnev era.

== Early life and career ==
Gapurow was born in a small village close to Charjou, Charjou Oblast (now Türkmenabat, Lebap Province). In December 1941, he was drafted into the army, serving as the commander of a gunners' section in the 88th Separate Rifle Brigade of the Central Asian Military District. From 1941 to 1944, he was on active duty in the Red Army during World War II. In 1948, he joined the Communist Party nomenklatura as head of the Propaganda Department at the district level in Charjou oblast and gradually climbed the party ladder. He graduated from the Pedagogical Institute in Ashkhabad in 1954. From 1951 to 1955, he worked as first secretary of the Komsomol organisation, and later he held various party posts before assuming the republic's leadership.

== Leadership of Turkmenistan ==
In 1969, he was appointed first secretary of the Communist Party of the Turkmen SSR. During his time in office, the republic received considerable investment in its modernisation of the gas and oil sectors, and living standards rose significantly for the general population. However, excessive centralised control over economic development and macroeconomic mismanagement led to a stagnation of economic growth in most sectors of the republic's economy in the late 1970s and early 1980s. Gapurow's era also witnessed further growth in nepotism, regional rivalries and corruption.

In 1985, the incoming general secretary, Mikhail Gorbachev, removed Gapurow from his post due to a cotton-related corruption scandal and sent him into retirement.

== Later life ==
He never returned to the political arena and held several minor positions in the late 1980s. He wrote several books and articles during the Soviet era, mainly on Communist Party and Turkmenistan development issues. In the 1990s, he began writing his memoirs but they were unfinished when he died on 13 July 1999. He was known to have one son, Batyr, who died of cardiac arrest in September 2015 at the age of 61.

== Sources ==
- Abazov, Rafis. Historical Dictionary of Turkmenistan, pp. 64–65. Scarecrow Press, 2005, ISBN 0-8108-5362-0.

Party political offices
Preceded by Balyş Öwezow	First Secretary of the Communist Party of the Turkmen SSR; 1969 – 1985	Succeeded by Saparmyrat Nyýazow
