= Armed Forces of Turkmenistan =

National military of Turkmenistan

- Turkmenistan Armed Forces emblem
- Founded: 27 January 1992; 34 years ago
- Service branches: Service branches Ground Forces; Air Forces; Navy; Independent formations Border Troops; Internal Troops; National Guard
- Headquarters: Ministry of Defense Building, Ashgabat
- Website: Milli Gosun National Army Newspaper

Leadership
- Supreme Commander-in-Chief: Serdar Berdimuhamedow
- Secretary of the State Security Council: Lieutenant General Begench Gundogdyev
- Minister of Defence: Lieutenant General Begench Gundogdyev
- Chief of the General Staff: Colonel Akmurad Anamedov

Personnel
- Military age: 18
- Conscription: 24 months (IISS 2012)
- Active personnel: 36,500 (Army 33,000, Air Force 3,000, Navy 500)

Expenditure
- Budget: $800 million (FY10) (IISS 2018)
- Percent of GDP: 3.6% (FY10)

Industry
- Foreign suppliers: Belarus; Kazakhstan; North Korea; Russia; Turkey; Serbia; United States

Related articles
- Ranks: Military ranks of Turkmenistan

The Armed Forces of Turkmenistan (Turkmen: Türkmenistanyň Ýaragly Güýçleri), known informally as the Turkmen National Army (Turkmen: Türkmenistanyň Milli goşun) is the national military of Turkmenistan. It consists of the Ground Forces, the Air Force and Air Defense Forces, Navy, and other independent formations (etc. Border Troops, Internal Troops and National Guard).

== History ==
=== Beginnings ===
After the fall of the Soviet Union, significant elements of the Soviet Armed Forces Turkestan Military District remained on Turkmen soil, including several motor rifle divisions. From V.I. Feskov et al. 2013 and Michael Holm's data, it appears that the three divisions were the 58th, 88th, and 209th District Training Centre (former 61 Training MRD) at Ashkhabad. In June 1992, the new Russian government signed a bilateral defense treaty with Turkmenistan, encouraging the new Turkmen government to create its own armed forces but stipulating that they were to be placed under joint command.

The United States Library of Congress Country Studies said that 'the Treaty on Joint Measures signed by Russia and Turkmenistan in July 1992 provided for the Russian Federation to act as guarantor of Turkmenistan's security and made former Soviet army units in the republic the basis of the new national armed forces. The treaty stipulated that, apart from border troops and air force and air defense units remaining under Russian control, the entire armed forces would be under joint command, which would gradually devolve to exclusive command by Turkmenistan over a period of ten years. For a transitional period of five years, Russia would provide logistical support and pay Turkmenistan for the right to maintain special installations, while Turkmenistan would bear the costs of housing, utilities, and administration.'

The Centre for Analysis of Strategies and Technologies's Moscow Defence Brief said that in 1992–93 Turkmenistan attempted to create a small national armed force based on the former Soviet 52nd Army, which was located in the country and depended on support from Russia. Of the 300 formations and units, numbering 110,000 people, 200 were transferred to the command of Turkmenistan, 70 remained under Russia's jurisdiction, and 30 were either withdrawn or demobilized.

In 1994, the chief of staff and first deputy minister of defense was Major General Annamurat Soltanov, a career officer who had served in Cuba and Afghanistan; another deputy minister of defense, Major General Begdzhan Niyazov, had been a law enforcement administrator prior to his appointment. Russian commanders included Major General Viktor Zavarzin, chief of staff and first deputy commander of the Separate Combined-Arms Army of Turkmenistan, and commander of the Separate Combined-Arms Army of Turkmenistan and deputy minister of defense Lieutenant General Nikolai Kormiltsev. Russian Major General Vladislav Shunevich served together with Turkmen Major General Akmurad Kabulov as joint commanders of the border troops in the Turkmen Border Guard. Under a 1993 bilateral military cooperation treaty, some 2,000 Russian officers served in Turkmenistan on contract, and border forces (about 5,000 in 1995) are under joint Russian and Turkmenistani command. Altogether, about 11,000 Russian troops remained in Turkmenistan in mid-1996.'

=== Military policy of Niyazov ===
Turkmenistan's military is considered to be the most neutral of all former republics of the Soviet Union. The country's military did not sign the Tashkent Treaty in May 1992, becoming an observer in the Council of Ministers of Defense of the CIS. Turkmenistan's first military doctrine was adopted in 1994 enforcing this. The neutral policy of Turkmenistan was also emphasized in relation to the 1996 Afghan War, maintaining an even relationship with both the Taliban and the Afghan government. Following the September 11 terrorist attacks, coalition troops did not appear on Turkmen territory. President Niyazov refused to provide the German government with a base to store German aircraft, arguing that the country intends to continue to follow the principles of neutrality.

In 2002, a "labor army" was created by Niyazov's orders which saw the creation of specialized labor military units. Soldiers in these units began to be sent from military units to enterprises, construction sites and hospitals as cheap labor, being removed from the jurisdiction of the Ministry of Defense.

=== Since 2006 ===
Jane's Information Group said in 2009 that "Turkmenistan's military is, even by the standards of Central Asia, poorly maintained and funded."

Weeks after he was inaugurated for a first term, President Gurbanguly Berdimuhamedov announced his decision to endorse the country's second military doctrine, officially declaring neutrality and stating that the border with Afghanistan will be a national security priority. In 2016, a new military doctrine was adopted by Berdimuhamedov. In November 2018, President Berdimuhamedov reiterated this at a session of the State Security Council.

== Military organization ==
=== Defense Ministry ===
The Ministry of Defense of Turkmenistan is a government agency of the armed forces which is the executive body in implementing defense policies in Turkmenistan. It was founded in January 1992 with the assistance of the Russian Armed Forces. Most of the original employees were retired Soviet officials in the Communist Party of the Turkmen SSR.

=== General Staff ===
- Land Forces Command
- Department of the Missile Forces and Artillery
- Department of the Air Force and Air Defense Forces Command
- Department of Communication Troops
- Department of Engineering Troops
- Department of training specialists for the Armed Forces of Turkmenistan
- Department of Specialized Formations

The Chief of the General Staff of Turkmen Armed Forces is the highest-ranking military officer in the military, being responsible for maintaining the operational command of the military and its three major branches.

The territorial Armed Forces of Turkmenistan are divided into 5 military districts in accordance with the administrative division of the country into 5 regions:

- Ahal Military District
- Balkan Military District
- Dashoguz Military District
- Lebap Military District
- Mary Military District

Each military district includes district military command and control bodies, military units, individual military units and subunits, military commissariats of etraps and cities with etrap rights. The Territorial Defence Troops of Turkmenistan also serve regional purposes.

== Ground Forces ==
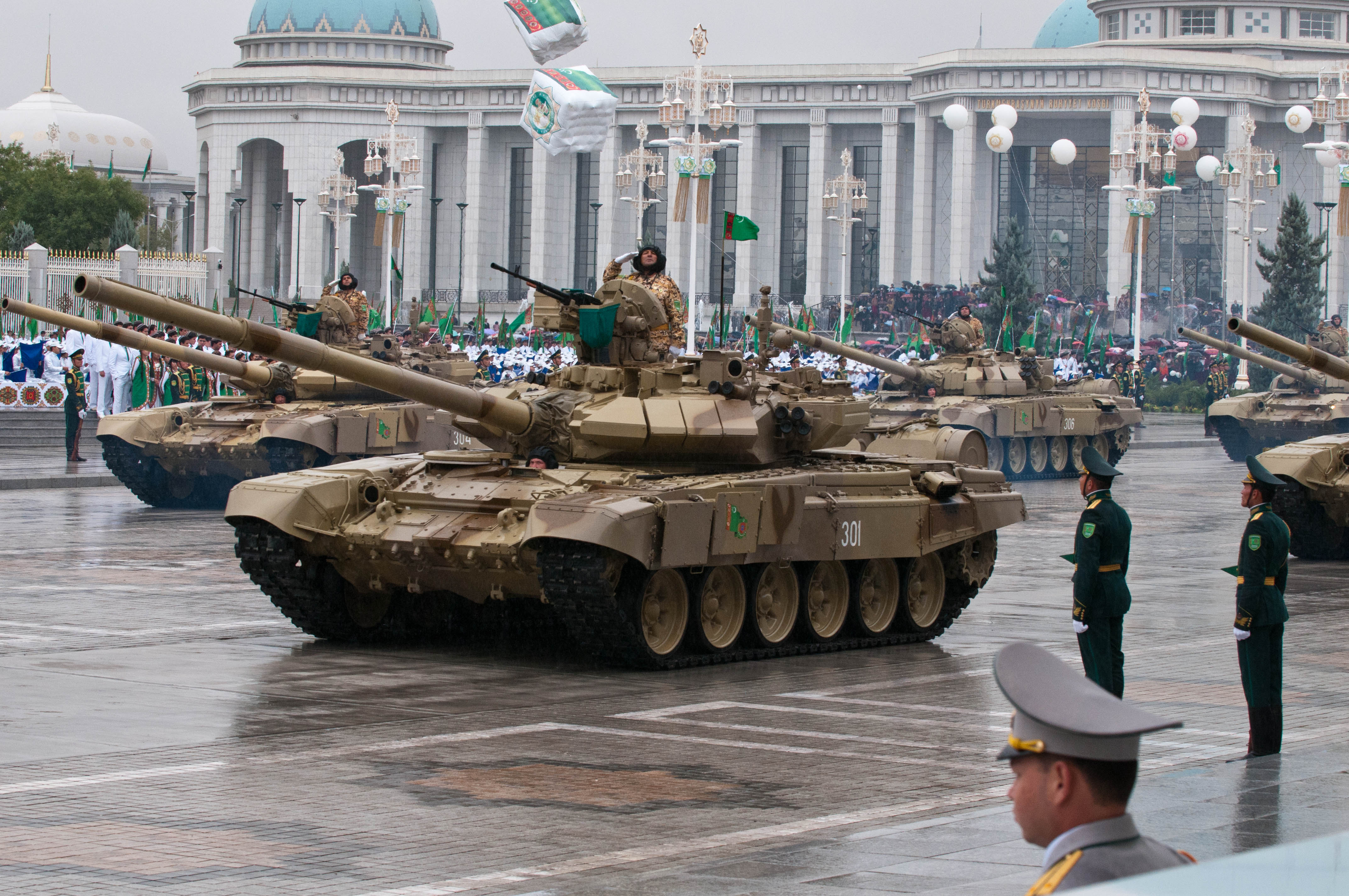
T-90SA and T-72UMG units.

The Turkmen Ground Forces inherited several motor rifle divisions from the Soviet Armed Forces Turkestan Military District, forming the basis for the branch. Among them was the 58th Motor Rifle Division at Kyzyl-Arvat. Today the ground forces include the 2nd, 3rd, 11th, and 22nd Motor Rifle Divisions. The 11th Motor Rifle Division "Sultan Sanjar" is the former Soviet 88th Motor Rifle Division, with its headquarters at Kushka/Serhetabat. It was reported in January 2007 that on the Caspian Sea and the coastal zone to a depth of 350 kilometers, and on the Turkmen-Iranian border is located about 90% of the Army (22nd Motorized Division on the Caspian coast, 2nd and 3rd motorized divisions on the Turkmen-Iranian border, 11th Motorized Division on the Tajik-Afghan border).

The number of vehicles is around 2,000, the number of tanks is around 700 and the number of artillery pieces is around 560. Turkmen ground forces equipment includes 702 T-72, and 10 T-90, ordered in 2009 for approximately $30 million. AIFV / APC include BTR-60/BTR-70/BTR-80 - 829, BMP-1/BMP-2 - 930, BRM-1 12, and BRDM-2 - 170. In 2021 Turkmenistan is to receive a batch of Lazar 3 8x8 armored vehicles from Serbia.

== Air Force ==
The IISS in 2012 said the Air Force had 3,000 personnel with 94 combat capable aircraft. The total number of aircraft is around 120. It said there were two fighter/ground attack squadrons with MiG-29/MiG-29UB (total of 24 both types), Sukhoi Su-17 Fitter-Bs (65) and two Sukhoi Su-25 Frogfoots (with 41 more being refurbished). It reported one transport squadron with Antonov An-26 'Curl' (1), and Mi-8s and Mi-24s (8 and 10 listed in service respectively). Training units had Sukhoi Su-7 Fitter-As (3 listed in service) and L-39 Albatross. Air defence missile units had SA-2, SA-3, and SA-5

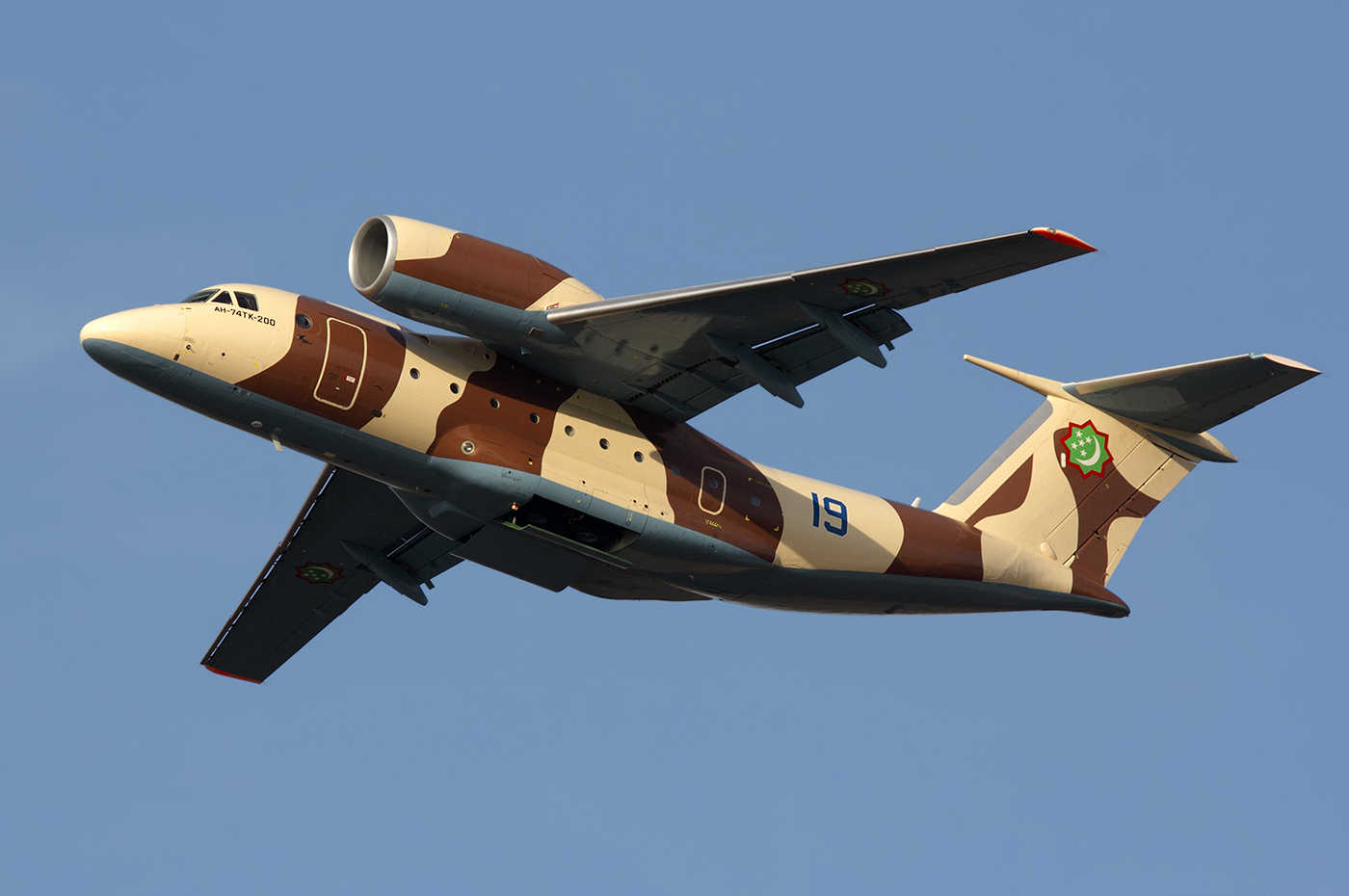
A Turkmenistan Antonov An-74TK-200

Units:

- 99th Aviation Base (former 67th Mixed Aviation Regiment) (Mary-2 airbase) with MiG-29 and Su-25.
- 47th Separate Mixed Aviation Squadron (Аk-Tepe/Ashkabad) with Аn-26/24, Mi-24 and Mi-8.
- 107th Fighter Aviation Regiment (Ak-Tepe) with 38 MiG-23 and 20 MiG-25 (not operational).
- 31st Separate Aviation Squadron (Chardzhou/Turkmenabad) with MiG-21, Su-7, L-39, Yak-28 and Аn-12 (not operational). Former 366th Independent Helicopter Squadron.
- 55th Fighter Aviation Regiment (Balkanabat) with MiG-23М (not operational). Former 179th Fighter Aviation Regiment.
- 56th Storage Base (Kyzyl-Arvat) with MiG-23. Former 217th Fighter/Bomber Aviation Regiment.
- 1st Anti-Aircraft Missile Regiment 'Turkmenbashi' (Bikrova/Ashkabad) with 2K11 Krug.
- 2nd Radio-Technical Brigade

== Naval Forces ==
Flag of the Turkmen Navy

The Turkmen naval forces are currently directed by the defense ministry and consist of around 700 servicemen and sixteen patrol boats. The Congressional Research Service, citing the International Institute for Strategic Studies, reports a number of six patrol boats.

The International Institute for Strategic Studies reported in 2007 that Turkmenistan intended to form a navy and had a minor base at Turkmenbashy with one USCG Point class cutter and five Kalkan-class patrol vessels. Jane's Fighting Ships 2001-2002 reported that the Point-class cutter was the Merjin, PB-129, (ex Point Jackson, 82378), which was transferred on 30 May 2000.

The country acquired four missile boats in 2011. In 2014 it acquired 10 Tuzla-class patrol boats which were all delivered by 2015.

In 2012, Turkmenistan announced its first naval exercises in the Caspian Sea programmed for early September. Named Hazar-2012 (Hazar is the Turkic name of the Caspian Sea), these tactical exercises came after a summer of somewhat heightened tensions with Azerbaijan over natural gas fields in a contested part of the sea.

== Other security forces ==
=== Türkmen Edermen ===
The Special Task Force "Türkmen Edermen" (Valiant Turkmen in English) is a composite military unit drawn from the armed forces and national law enforcement agencies such as the Ministry of Internal Affairs, the State Border Service, and the Ministry for National Security.

=== Presidential Security Service ===
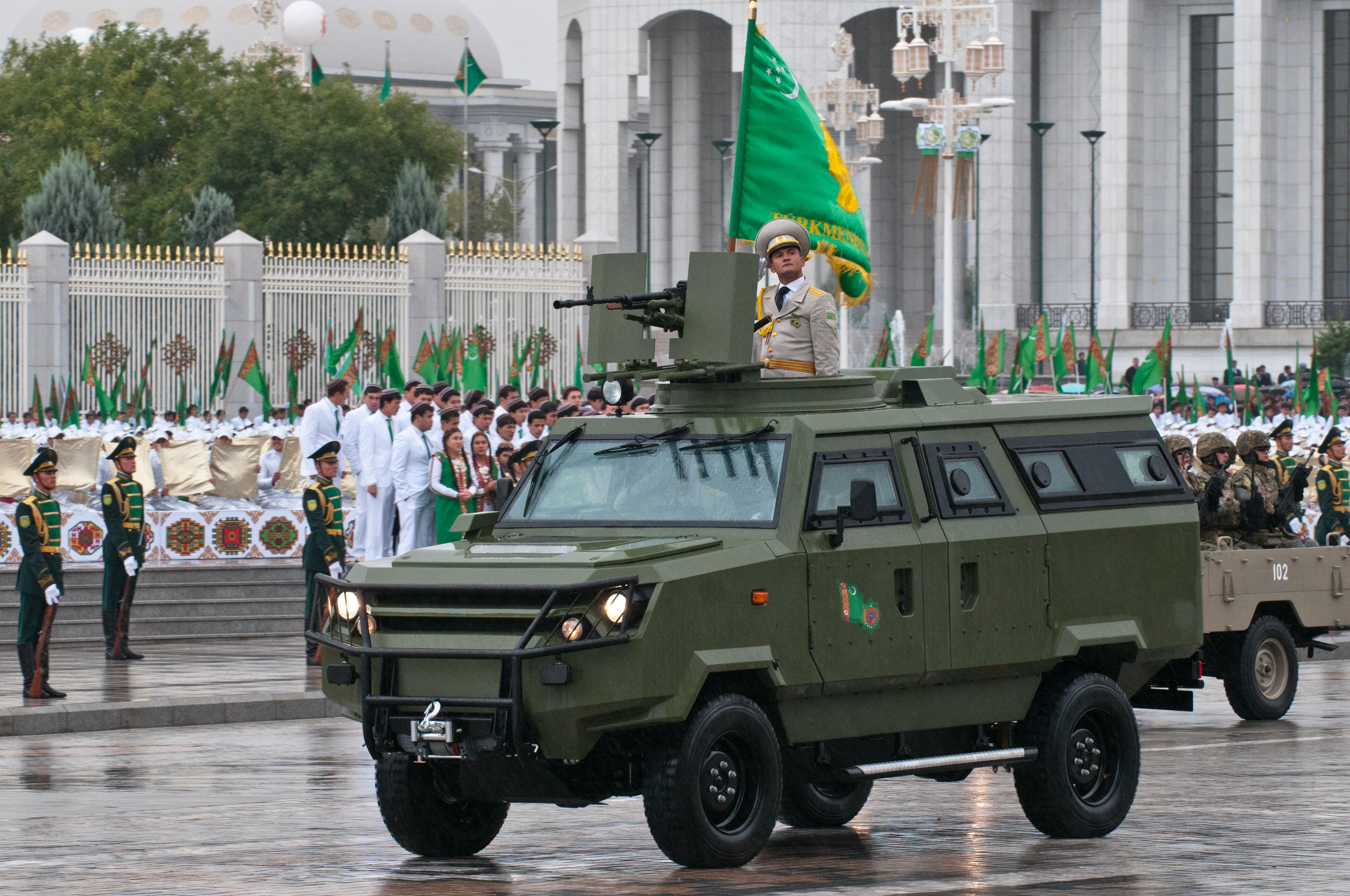
A vehicle of the security service in 2011

The Presidential Security Service (Turkmen: Prezidentiniň howpsuzlyk gullugy) is responsible for ensuring the protection and security of the president. Established in November 1990, it is a directly reporting body of the President of Turkmenistan and not part of the Ministry of Defense. During state visits to foreign countries, the service provides at least 10 agents to protect the president. The Presidential Security Service is currently composed of 2,000 employees.

=== Border Guard ===
The State Border Service of Turkmenistan is a public service department in the government of the country and is under the command of the Ministry for National Security of Turkmenistan. The main tasks of the service include the following: protecting of the national border of the country, combating international terrorism and drug trafficking, targeting illegal migration and human trafficking, and protecting oil and gas platforms and pipelines in the Caspian Sea. The head of the service is a member of the Council of Border Guard Commanders of the Commonwealth of Independent States (CIS).

=== Internal Troops ===
The Internal Troops is under the auspices of the Ministry of Internal Affairs. It is designed to maintain law and order and enforce the status quo in terms of state sovereignty. It aides the Turkmen National Police in its everyday activities, being organized similarly to the ground forces.

== Equipment ==
Military equipment of the Armed Forces of Turkmenistan
Name	Photo	Origin	In service	Notes
Tanks
T-72 'Ural' Early		Soviet Union	N/A	
T-72 'Ural' Late		Soviet Union	N/A	
T-72A Early		Soviet Union	N/A	
T-72A Late		Soviet Union	N/A	
T-72AV		Soviet Union	N/A	
T-72UMG		Ukraine	N/A	
T-90S		Russia	N/A	
Armoured Fighting Vehicles
BRDM-2		Soviet Union	N/A	
Infantry Fighting Vehicles
BMP-1(P)		Soviet Union	N/A	
BMP-1U 'Shkval'		Ukraine	N/A	
BMP-2 Obr. 1980		Soviet Union	N/A	
BMP-2D		Soviet Union	N/A	
BMP-3		Russia	N/A	
BTR-80A		Russia	N/A	
BTR-80U 'Grom'		Ukraine	N/A	
Lazar-3		Serbia	N/A	[Ministry for National Security].
Armoured Personnel Carriers
BTR-70		Soviet Union	N/A	
BTR-80		Soviet Union	N/A	
Mine-Resistant Ambush Protected (MRAP) Vehicles
KamAZ-63968 Typhoon		Russia	N/A	
BMC Kirpi		Turkey	N/A	[State Border Service and Ground Forces].
BMC Vuran		Turkey	N/A	[State Border Service].
Infantry Mobility Vehicles
Otokar Ural		Turkey	N/A	[Ministry of Internal Affairs].
Otokar Cobra		Turkey	N/A	[State Border Service].
BMC Amazon		Turkey	N/A	[State Border Service].
INKAS Titan-DS		United Arab Emirates	N/A	[State Border Service and Ground Forces].
NIMR Ajban 440A		United Arab Emirates	N/A	
NIMR Ajban LRSOV		United Arab Emirates	N/A	
Al Shibl 2		Saudi Arabia	N/A	
Plasan StormRider		Israel	N/A	[Ministry for National Security].
IMI CombatGuard		Israel	N/A	
Bars		Belarus	N/A	
Iveco LMV		Italy	N/A	[Ministry for National Security].
PMV Survivor II		Austria	N/A	[State Border Service and Ministry of Internal Affairs].
KLTV		South Korea	N/A	[State Border Service].
Dongfeng EQ2050		China	N/A	
Tactical Vehicles And Technicals
Polaris DAGOR		United States	N/A	
Polaris MRZR		United States	N/A	
Polaris MV850 ATV 4x4		United States	N/A	
Polaris MV850 ATV 6x6		United States	N/A	
Toyota Land Cruiser		Japan	N/A	
Combat Engineering Vehicle
IMR-2(M)		Soviet Union	N/A	
Bridgelayer
MTU-55		Soviet Union	N/A	
Tracked Amphibious Transport
PTS-2		Soviet Union	N/A	
Minelayer
GMZ-3		Soviet Union	N/A	
Chemical Cleaning Vehicle
TMS-65U		Soviet Union	N/A	
Self-Propelled Anti-Tank Missile Systems
9P133 Malyutka		Soviet Union	N/A	
9P149 Shturm-S		Soviet Union	N/A	
Caracal Shershen-Q		Belarus	N/A	
Towed Artillery
100mm MT-12		Soviet Union	N/A	
122mm D-30		Soviet Union	N/A	
152mm D-20		Soviet Union	N/A	
152mm 2A65 Msta-B		Soviet Union	N/A	
152mm 2A36 Giatsint-B		Soviet Union	N/A	
Self-Propelled Artillery
122mm 2S1 Gvozdika		Soviet Union	N/A	
152mm 2S3 Akatsiya		Soviet Union	N/A	
Multiple Rocket Launchers
122mm 9P122 'Grad-P'		Soviet Union	N/A	
122mm BM-21 'Grad'		Soviet Union	N/A	
122mm BM-21A BelGrad Chassis MAZ-631705		Belarus	N/A	[State Border Service and Ground Forces].
122mm RM-70		Czech Republic	N/A	
220mm BM-27 Uragan		Soviet Union	N/A	
300mm BM-30 Smerch		Russia	N/A	
Artillery Rockets
9K52 Luna-M		Soviet Union	N/A	(Likely to have been decommissioned).
Ballistic Missiles
R-17 Scud-B		Soviet Union	N/A	(Likely to have been decommissioned),
(Self-Propelled) Anti-Aircraft Guns
23mm ZU-23		Soviet Union	N/A	[State Border Service and Ground Forces].
23mm ZSU-23-4 Shilka		Soviet Union	N/A	
Static Surface-To-Air Missile (SAM) Systems
S-125		Soviet Union	N/A	Range: 22 km], (Three sites protecting the capital Ashgabat).
S-200		Soviet Union	N/A	[Range: 300 km], (Two sites protecting Türkmenbaşy and Mary).
Self-Propelled Surface-To-Air Missile (SAM) Systems
9K35 Strela-10M		Belarus	N/A	[Range: 5 km].
9K33 Osa		Soviet Union	N/A	[Range: 15 km].
FM-90		China	N/A	[Range: 15 km].
S-125-2BM		Belarus	N/A	[Range: 22 km].
Pechora-2M		Russia	N/A	[Range: 22 km].
2K12 Kub		Soviet Union	N/A	[Range: 25 km].
KS-1A		China	N/A	[Range: 50 km].
2K11 Krug		Soviet Union	N/A	[Range: 55 km].
FD-2000		China	N/A	[Range: 125 km].
Electronic Warfare Systems
Rohde & Schwarz EW System		Germany	N/A	
Radars
P-14 'Tall King'		Soviet Union	N/A	
P-18 'Spoon Rest D'		Soviet Union	N/A	
P-35/37 'Bar Lock'		Soviet Union	N/A	
P-80 'Back Net'		Soviet Union	N/A	
PRV-11 'Side Net'		Soviet Union	N/A	
36D6 'Tin Shield'		Soviet Union	N/A	
SNR-125 'Low Blow'		Soviet Union	N/A	(For S-125).
SNR-125-2BM		Belarus	N/A	(For S-125-2BM ''PF 50 Alebarda'').
SNR-125-2M		Russia	N/A	(For Pechora-2M), (Not yet seen).
5N62 'Square Pair'		Soviet Union	N/A	(For S-200).
1S32 'Pat Hand'		Soviet Union	N/A	(For 2K11 Krug).
SURN 1S91		Soviet Union	N/A	(For 2K12 Kub).
Kolchuga		Ukraine	N/A	
YLC-2V		China	N/A	(For FD-2000).
HKJM2		China	N/A	(For FD-2000).
HT-233		China	N/A	(For FD-2000), (Not yet seen).
H-200		China	N/A	(For KS-1A), (Not yet seen).
YLC-18		China	N/A	
DWL-002		China	N/A	
TS-504		China	N/A	
Surveillance Unmanned Aerial Vehicles
Aeronautics Defense Orbiter 2B		Israel	N/A	
Elbit Skylark		Israel	N/A	(Used in conjunction with a ground-based rapid mine laying system).
Selex ES Falco XN		Italy	N/A	
Busel M		Belarus	N/A	
Busel M40		Belarus	N/A	(License-produced in Turkmenistan).
Boeing Insitu ScanEagle 2		United States	N/A	
Unmanned Combat Aerial Vehicles
CASC Rainbow CH-3A		China	N/A	(Armed with two AR-1 AGMs).
WJ-600A/D		China	N/A	(Armed with two CM-502 kg AGMs).
Bayraktar TB2		Turkey	N/A	(Armed with four MAM-C or MAM-L (with an 15+km range) PGMs).
Busel MB2		Belarus	N/A	(Armed with F1 grenades and PTAB-2.5 and PFAB-05 small bombs, while license-produced in Turkmenistan).
Loitering Munitions
SkyStriker		Israel	N/A	
Busel MB1		Belarus	N/A	(Documented by a few sources, not yet seen).
Vertical Take-Off And Landing Unmanned Aerial Vehicles
DJI Phantom 4		China	N/A	
MD4-1000		Germany	N/A	
Target Drones
La-17		Soviet Union	N/A	(Believed to have been decommissioned).
ASN-9 ''Ba-9''		China	N/A	
S300		China	N/A	

== Personnel ==
=== Ranks ===
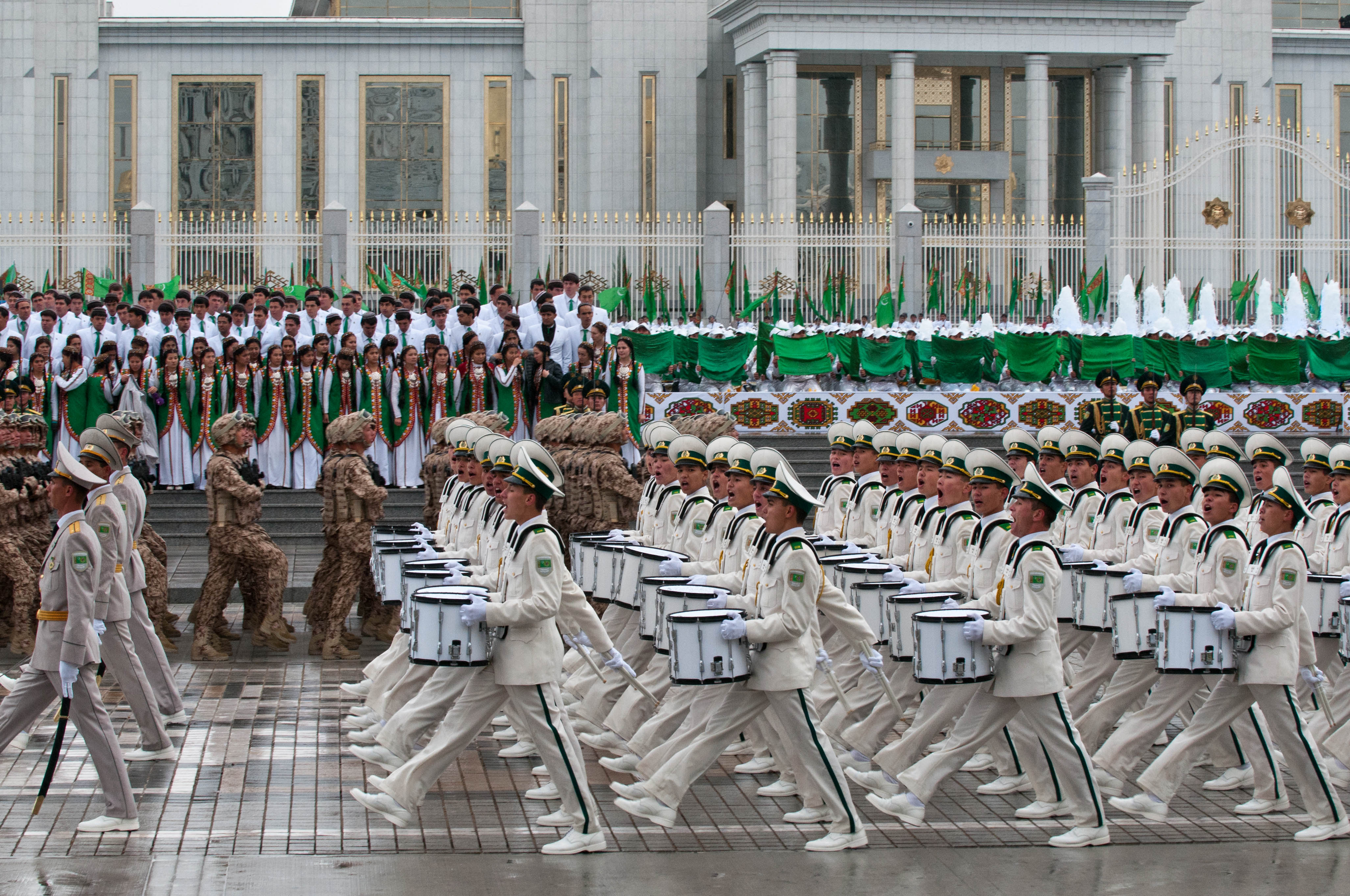
The corps of drums of the Berdimuhamed Annayev 1st Specialized Military School.

=== Military education ===
Founded in 1993 and 2007 respectively, the Military Institute of the Ministry of Defense of Turkmenistan and the Military Academy of Turkmenistan are the senior most military academies of their kind in Turkmenistan. Other military academies include the Turkmen Police Academy, the Turkmen National Security Institute, and the Turkmen Naval Institute. Border guards are trained at special institutes in military universities.

=== Personnel awards ===
- Medal "Edermenlik"
- Medal "For impeccable service to the Fatherland"
- Medal "Turkmen Edermen"
- Breastplate "Valiant Border Guard"
- Myalikguly Berdymuhamedov Medal

=== Uniforms ===
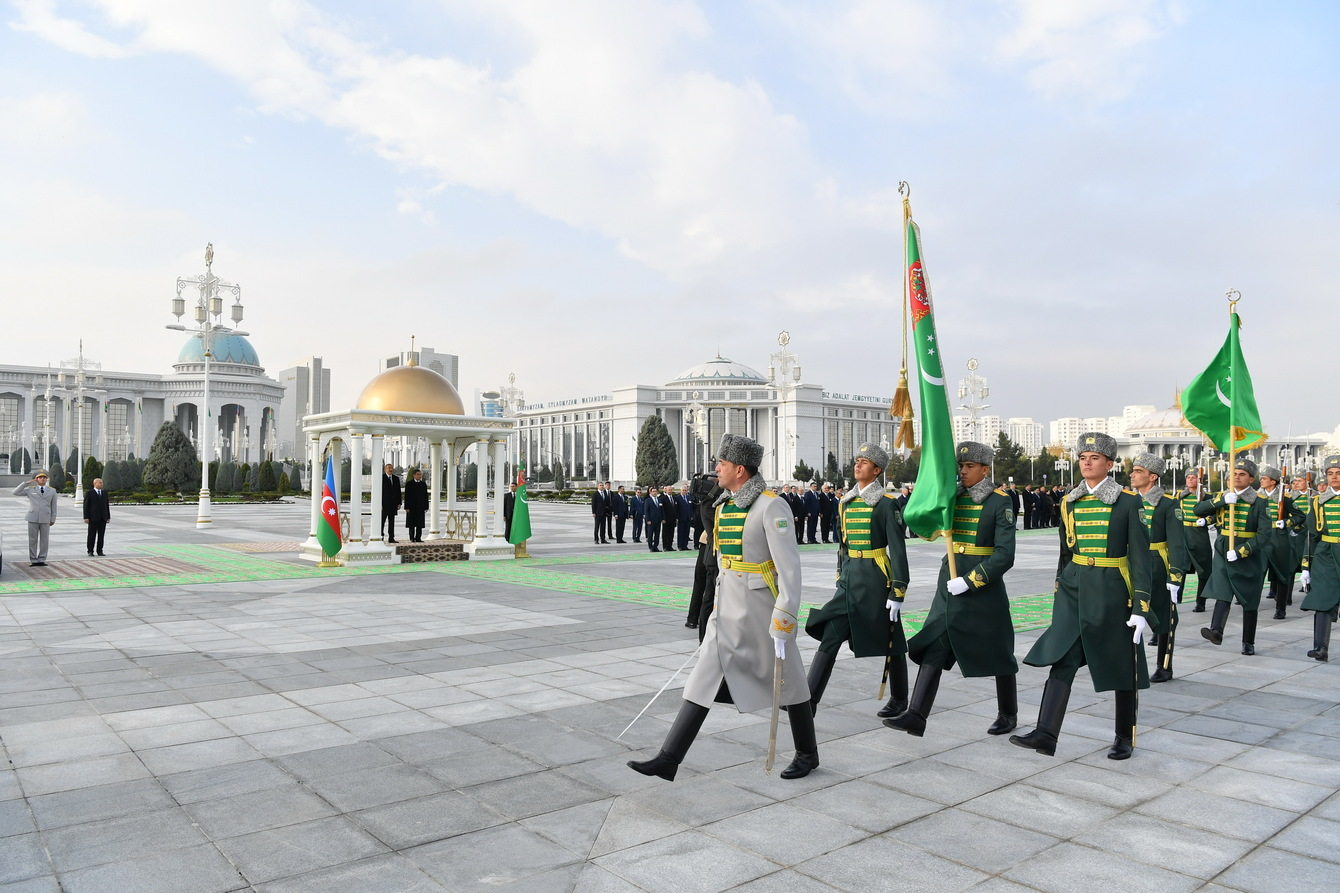
Turkmen honour guards in winter uniform.

Military uniforms are sewn in the following factories of the Ministry of Textile Industry on the orders of the Ministry of Defense of Turkmenistan:

- Ruhabat Textile Complex
- Geokdepe Textile Complex
- Turkmenbashi Textile Complex
- Ahal Sewing Production Association
- Bayramali Textile Complex
- Turkmen-Kalkan Joint Venture

The semi-woolen fabrics that are not produced in Turkmenistan are supplied through the Turkmendokma Foreign Trade Enterprise of the Ministry of Textile Industry.

=== Conscription ===
Service in the armed forces is required for all males under 27 years of age. Minister of Defence Dangatar Kopekov stated in 1992 that legislation was drafted to where draft dodgers would face "very severe measures, including criminal responsibility". Despite this, desertion is rampant, and was at a 20% rate in 1994. For many military units, it has often been accepted that commanders extort bribes for an early demobilization of conscripts.

There have been reported cases of mistreatment of army conscripts on duty and Hazing.

=== Women in the National Army ===
Women under the age of 21 who have a secondary education and have volunteered for military service can qualify for higher educational studies at the military institute. In 2016, Senior Lieutenant Jahan Yazmuhammedova became the first female paratrooper in the Armed Forces, serving in the 152nd Independent Air Assault Battalion. A parade in 2019 was the first parade in which female siblings (Captains Shirin and Aknabat Velikurbanov) took part in the parade as part of the same contingent. The contingent in question was led by Major Nabat Nurgeldyeva, who was in her 16th parade.
