= Otokar Akrep =

Akrep
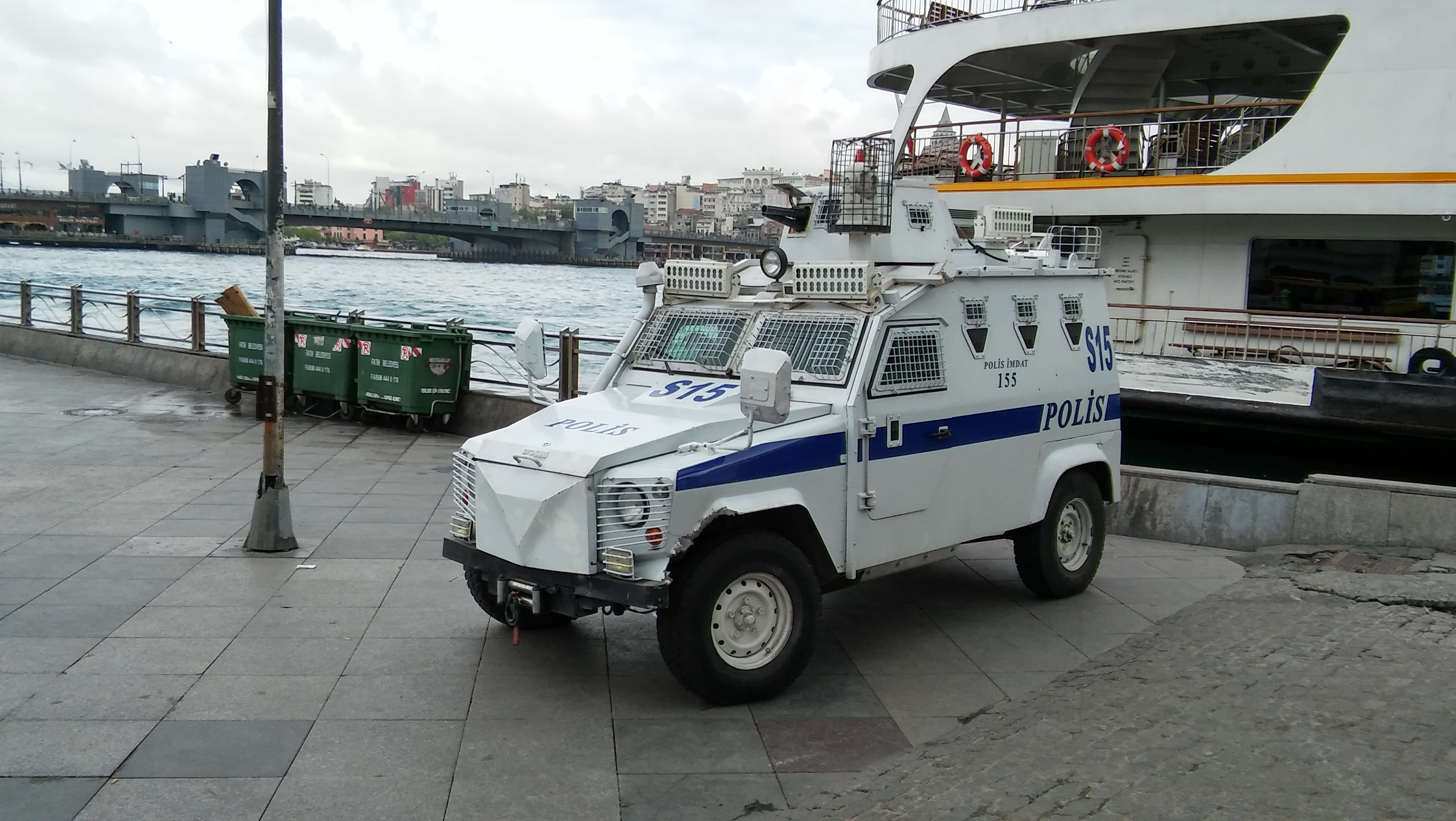
- Type: Infantry mobility vehicle
- Place of origin: Turkey

Service history
- In service: 1994
- Wars: Kurdish–Turkish conflict; War in North-West Pakistan; Iraq War

Production history
- Designer: Otokar
- Designed: 1990
- Manufacturer: Otokar
- Produced: 1994
- Variants: developed from Land Rover Defender 130

Specifications
- Mass: 3.6 t (3.5 long tons; 4.0 short tons)
- Length: 4.19 m (13 ft 9 in)
- Width: 1.91 m (6 ft 3 in)
- Height: 2.563 m (8 ft 4.9 in)
- Crew: 2+6
- Main armament: 7.62 mm or .50 inch machine gun on remote weapon station
- Engine: diesel
- Suspension: 4x4

Akrep ("Scorpion") is a Turkish infantry mobility vehicle family developed by Otokar Otobus Karoseri Sanayi AS. The first prototypes were completed in May 1993 and the first vehicles came off the production line in June 1994. In addition to light reconnaissance, the vehicles were used for escort, perimeter control, counterinsurgency, and light attack. The Akrep represented the latest offering in Otokar's portfolio of light vehicles for both civilian and military markets.

== Description ==
Based on the Shorland APC, the Akrep has an all-welded steel hull with some 70% of its automotive components used from the Land Rover Defender 90/110 (4x4) vehicle. A monocoque steel armor hull protects from small arms fire up to 7.62 mm ball ammunition fired at 90° incidence and point-blank range, and shell splinters. All windows and vision blocks are made of laminated construction armored glass with a polycarbonate liner. The layout is conventional, with the engine at the front, driver and commander in the center, and the machine gun installation mounted on the roof toward the rear with the gunner seated below. The windshield is bulletproof. There are two doors with bulletproof windows at the top and firing ports below. There are also firing ports and viewers on both sides of the hull and a large rear hull door with a firing port that swings out leftward. There is a hatch in the rear section of the roof that opens rearward. The roof gun mount is typically armed with a 7.62 mm machine gun that may be aimed and fired from inside the vehicle. Also there is AGS-17 mounted variants being used in Northern Cyprus.

The mount can traverse 180° left and right and the 7.62 mm machine gun can elevate from -20° to +70°. There are 230 rounds of ready-use ammunition, and an additional 3,000 rounds carried inside the vehicle. The firing is electronically controlled with safety locking and braking together with a mechanical backup. There is also a last round indicator. The day sight has a wide field of view (22°) with 1x magnification and a collimated aiming circle, and a narrow field of view (8°) with 8x magnification and a ballistic graticule. The night sight has a wide field of view (22°) with 1x magnification and collimated aiming circle, and a narrow field of view (7°) with 7x magnification, a 25 mm image intensifier tube, and a ballistic graticule. Standard equipment includes an air conditioning system, a heater and defogger, an infrared driving headlamp, a blackout lighting system, a smoke extraction fan mounted on the roof, thick polyurethane roof and body interior lining for thermal and noise insulation, an explosion-suppressed fuel tank, and Hutchinson run-flat tires. Optional equipment includes a front-mounted electrical winch with 25 meters of cable at a capacity of 3,600 kg, 66 mm smoke grenade launchers, a pioneer kit (axe, shovel, pickaxe), a communications system, and a land navigation system.

The Akrep is relatively light, fast, and maneuverable. Its high power/weight ratio and long travel suspension support mobility in urban conditions, rough terrain, and challenging weather.

== Design and manufacture ==
The Akrep's low profile, ballistic hull design, and special armor protection and agility are all designed to maximize its ability to survive in high-threat environments. Each armor plate is laboratory tested and certified. Each panel is stamped prior to production and fully traceable.

All mechanical parts of Akrep are made using commercial off-the-shelf components.

== Akrep II ==
Akrep II
- Type: Armored car
- Place of origin: Turkey

Production history
- Manufacturer: Otokar
- Produced: 2019 – present

Specifications
- Mass: 13.5 tonnes (30,000 lb) (e); 15 tonnes (33,000 lb) (d)
- Length: 5.5 m (18.0 ft) (e), 5.9 m (19.4 ft) (d)
- Width: 2.5 m (8.2 ft)
- Height: 1.8 m (5.9 ft) (e), 1.95 m (6.4 ft) (d)
- Crew: 3 (driver, commander, gunner)
- Armor: Classified + add-on armor
- Main armament: 25 mm autocannon (Bozok remotely controlled turret), 90 mm gun (CSE 90LP turret)
- Secondary armament: Machine guns
- Engine: Electric motors (e), diesel engine (d); 2×180 kilowatts (240 hp) (e), 360 horsepower (270 kW) (d)
- Ground clearance: 400 mm
- Operational range: At least 200 km (electric)
- Maximum speed: 110 km/h

Otokar Akrep II is a Turkish multi-role vehicle produced by Otokar. There were 2 main types of Akrep II, the electric-drive type is called Akrep IIe, and the diesel-drive type is called Akrep IId. A hybrid-drive version is planned. The vehicle can also be configured as a weapon platform for quick reaction, surveillance missions, armored security, base/air defense missions and other similar missions.

The electric-drive vehicle was introduced at the International Defence Industry Fair 2019 IDEF in Istanbul. The diesel-drive Akrep II was introduced at IDEF 2021.

The Akrep IId powerpack is quite unique in the military, as a U-drive has been adopted in order to shorten the pack, to fit it inside the rear engine compartment. The engine is located on the right, with the transmission on the left. The reason is to fit a 2-man turret (Cockerill CSE 90LP). It is armed with a 90 mm low pressure rifled gun with a 36 calibre barrel length, which allows direct firing as well as indirect fire at a range of 6 km with a 30° elevation.

As standard equipment Akrep II is equipped with central tire inflation, run flat inserts, ABS, air conditioning. Rear axle steering (which allows reducing the turning radius), CBRN filtration, self recovery winch, and numerous situational awareness and safety systems can be optionally equipped.

== Operators ==
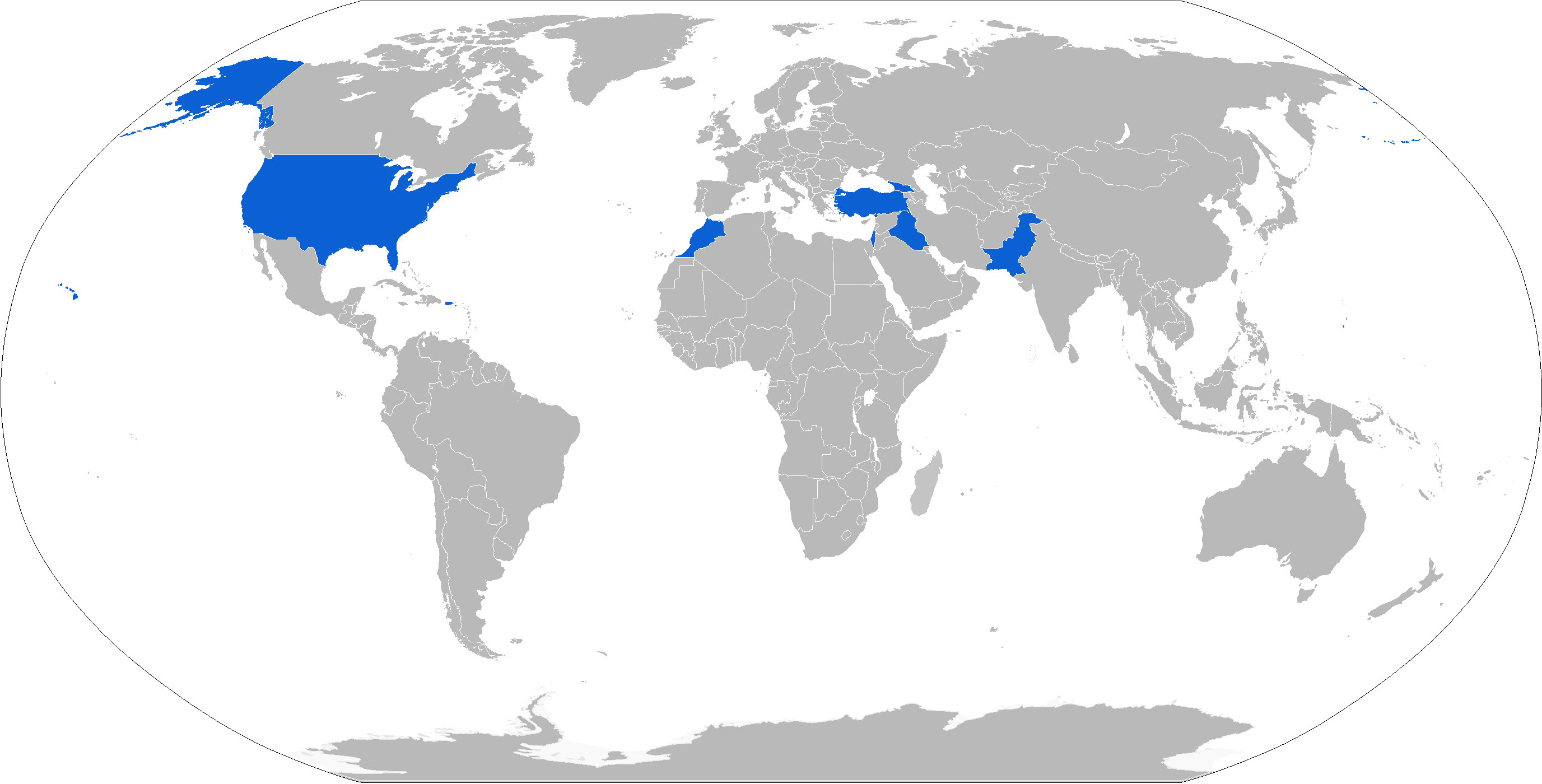
Map of Otokar Akrep operators in blue

=== Current operators ===
- Albania used by RENEA
- Algeria
- Bangladesh
  - Border Guards Bangladesh
- Georgia
- Kosovo
- Iraq
- Israel
- Morocco
- Northern Cyprus
- Pakistan
- Turkey
- United States

== See also ==
- Otokar Cobra
- Otokar Akrep II
