= Türkmen Edermen =

Military unit of the Armed Forces of Turkmenistan

The Special Task Force Türkmen Edermen (Valiant Turkmen in English) is a military unit of the Armed Forces of Turkmenistan. It is a composite unit drawn from the armed forces and national law enforcement agencies such as the Ministry of Internal Affairs, the State Border Service, and the Ministry for National Security. It primarily has a special operations role during war time situations. The main distinguishing feature of the battalion is high level of combat, theoretical and physical training.

== Symbols ==
The Turkmen Alabai, adorns the emblem of the Turkmen Edermen unit. It has also become a de facto unit mascot.

=== Unit medal ===
On 5 September 2019, President Gurbanguly Berdimuhamedow gave the order to create the special medal "Turkmen Edermen". The corresponding decree was signed by the President on 30 November. The decree stated that the medal would be awarded to soldiers of the Ministries of Defense, National Security, and Internal Affairs. The medal has the shape of a circle with a total diameter of 45 millimetres, encrusted with stones. The 2 mm wide ring, covered with yellow enamel, which shapes the edges of the medal, is framed by 111 white zirconium stones each with a diameter of 1 mm.

== Equipment ==
Their equipment includes off-road vehicles made by American company Polaris Industries as well as several modernized BTR-80 armored personnel carriers.

== See also ==
- Alpha Group
- Spetsnaz
