= YLC-4 Radar =

YLC-4 is a Chinese UHF solid-state, fully coherent 2D long range surveillance radar, which is mainly used for long range surveillance. The radar has the ability to synthesize data from up to four other radars with a large data capacity, and to communicate and display the data and state of the system through the net to realize remote control and detection. When equipped with height-finding radar, it can perform the function of guidance and providing target data for an air traffic control system. With long range detection range, high reliability and easy maintenance, YLC-4 radar is a main radar in air defense network. The manufacturer of the system is Nanjing Research Institute of Electronics Technology (NRIET).

== Design ==
The YLC-4 system consist of four components: the antenna, the signal cabin, transmitter and the power generators (2 x 120 kW diesel generators).

== Specifications ==
- Frequency range: P band
- Range (at σ= 2 m^{2} and Pf=10^{−6}):
  - Rmax: 410 km (Pd=0.5)
  - Rmax: 380 km (Pd=0.8)
- Coverage:
  - Azimuth: 0° < 360°
  - Elevation: 0° < 25°
- Reliability
  - MTBFC: => 500 hours
  - MTTR: <=0.5 hours
- Other features:
- Super cosecant square beam in elevation
- Solid-state, full coherent, pulse compression and AMTI technology, DMTI adaptive system
- Employing various frequency agilities and low sidelobe antenna (< -30 dB), dynamic factor => 45 dB
