= Gurbanmuhammet Kasymow =

Turkmen politician (1954–2021)

Gurbanmuhammet Kasymow (30 July 1954 – 2 September 2021) was a Turkmen politician, lawyer, and diplomat.

He headed several government ministries under former President of Turkmenistan Saparmyrat Nyýazow, including Minister of Internal Affairs from 1993 to 1998, Minister of Defense from 1998 to 1999, and Minister of Justice from 1999 until 2001. Kasymow was one of the few former Turkmen government ministers who was not arrested or persecuted by Turkmenistan's presidents after leaving office. He later served as Ambassador to China from 2001 to 2008 and Ambassador to Kazakhstan from 2008 until 2009.

== Biography ==
Kasymow graduated from the Faculty of Law at Turkmen State University in 1976.

He has been described as one of the most influential government officials within the government of President Saparmyrat Nyýazow during the 1990s. He served as the interior minister from 1993 to 1998, during which he actively suppressed anti-government protests in Ashgabat in 1995, leading to the imprisonment of dozens of opposition activists. He then became Minister of Defense from 1998 to 1999 and Minister of Justice from 1999 until 2001.

Kasymow next served as Ambassador to China from 2001 to 2008 and Ambassador to Kazakhstan from 2008 until 2009. He remained a policy advisor within the Ministry of Foreign Affairs until shortly before his death.

Gurbanmuhammet Kasymow died from complications of COVID-19 at his residence in Gökje, a former village in Ashgabat, on 2 September 2021, at the age of 68. The government publicly denies the presence of COVID-19 in Turkmenistan and Kasymow's cause of death was not reported in the Turkmen media.
