= Geldymukhammed Ashirmukhammedov =

Turkmen general

Geldymuhammed Aşirmuhamedow

6th Minister of Internal Affairs of Turkmenistan
- In office 13 August 2004 – 9 December 2004
- President: Saparmyrat Nyýazow
- Preceded by: Aşyr Ataýew
- Succeeded by: Akmämmet Rahmanow

Personal details
- Born: 1965 Balkan Region
- Education: Turkmen State University
- Awards: Order of Turkmenbashi; Medal "For Love of the Fatherland"

Military service
- Rank: Lieutenant General

Geldymukhammed Ashirmukhammedov (Turkmen: Geldymuhammed Aşirmuhamedow) is a Turkmen general who served in the military, police and security forces of Turkmenistan.

== Early life and career ==
He was born in 1957 in the Balkan Region of the Turkmen SSR. He graduated from Turkmen State University in 1979 with a degree in physics. From 1979 to 1982, he taught physics in the No.2 secondary school in the town of Cheleken (now Hazar). From 1982 to 1992 he occupied various positions within the Soviet KGB and the KGB of the Turkmen SSR. He graduated from the higher KGB courses first in Minsk in 1983 and later in Kiev in 1985.

== Turkmen government ==
In 1992 he was transferred to the Office of the President of Turkmenistan. In the five years that followed, he served in various positions as an officer of the Presidential Security Service. In 1997, he was appointed to the post of Commander of the Turkmen Ground Forces, a position he would serve in until 2002. He was appointed deputy chairman of the Turkmen KNB in 2002.

=== Interior minister ===
On 13 August 2004, Ashirmukhammedov, who was also at the time the First Deputy Interior Minister, was appointed by President Saparmurat Niyazov as the new interior minister of Turkmenistan. He was concurrently made the rector of the Turkmen Police Academy. He served until 9 December, when he became Chairman of the KNB. In June 2006, he was among several officials who claimed to have foiled an opposition plot aimed at destabilizing the country, with Ashirmukhammedov accusing foreign nationals and diplomats of being involved. He accused one member of being trained in "methods used during Ukraine's Orange Revolution", and also named representatives of the French embassy and the Organization for Security and Cooperation in Europe (OSCE) as co-conspirators. He also took part in the investigation of former Deputy Prime Minister Yolli Gurbanmuradov, telling President Niyazov and the cabinet of ministers that he "received Internet information from representatives of foreign intelligence services about selling Turkmen oil at reduced prices".

== Later life ==
On 8 October 2007, he was dismissed for health reasons. His further fate is unknown. He holds the rank of Lieutenant General. He was awarded the “Edermenlik” and “For the great love for Fatherland” medals.

== See also ==
- Begench Beknazarov
- Boris Shikhmuradov
- Batyr Berdiýew
