= Otokar =

Turkish vehicle manufacturer

Otokar Otomotiv ve Savunma Sanayi A.Ş.

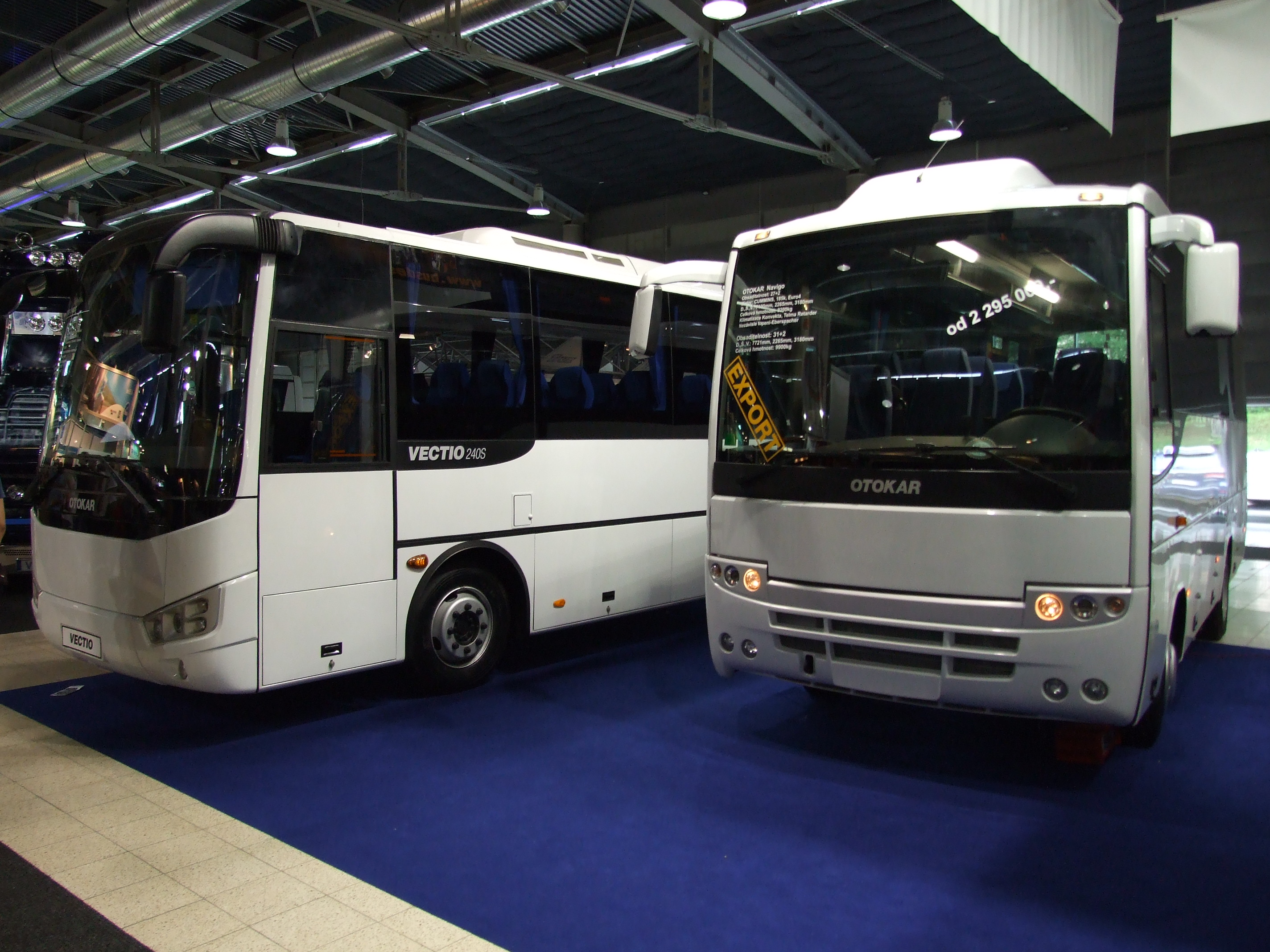
- Type: Public
- Traded as: BİST: OTKAR
- Industry: Automotive & Defense
- Founded: 1963; 63 years ago
- Headquarters: Arifiye, Sakarya, Turkey
- Area served: Europe, Middle East, Central Asia, Africa
- Key people: Ali Koç (Chairperson); İbrahim Aykut Özüner (CEO)
- Products: Buses; Trucks; Trailers; Military vehicles
- Revenue: ▲US$982 million (2024)
- Operating income: ▲$87 million (2023)
- Net income: ▲$71 million (2023)
- Total assets: ▲$1.28 billion (2024)
- Total equity: ▲$291 million (2023)
- Number of employees: 3580 (2023)
- Parent: Koç Holding
- Subsidiaries: Otokar Europe SAS (France); Otokar Land Systems LLC (UAE); Otokar Europe Filiala Bucuresti SRL (Romania); Otokar Central Asia Limited (Kazakhstan)
- Website: www.otokar.com.tr

Otokar Otomotiv ve Savunma Sanayi A.Ş., also known simply as Otokar, is a Turkish bus and military vehicle manufacturer headquartered in Sakarya, Turkey. Otokar is a subsidiary of Koç Holding.

== History ==
Otokar was founded in 1963 as Turkey's first bus manufacturing company under the license of Magirus-Deutz. The company was noted for manufacturing the most modern buses and modern intercity vehicles for that period. In the early 1980s, Otokar started production of Deutz-powered vehicles with local components. During this period, Turkey's largest conglomerate, Koç Holding, purchased major share of Otokar. Within its public transportation strategies in the early 1980s, the company added intercity bus to its lineup.

In the mid-1980s, Otokar manufactured the first Turkish armoured vehicle as an armoured car by acquiring the manufacturing license of Jaguar Land Rover. In 1987, the Turkish Armed Forces ordered Otokar to manufacture military Land Rover Defender in Turkey in cooperation with Land Rover.

In the early 1990s, Otokar developed the Otokar Armoured Personnel Carrier, Otokar Akrep and Otokar Cobra which was Turkey's first 4x4 light-armoured tactical wheeled vehicle in which Otokar combined its armour technology with the experience in military vehicles. In 1997, the company moved to its new manufacturing facilities in Sakarya, Arifiye.

In 2002, Otokar acquired a trailer and semi-trailer production company from Koç Group Company of Istanbul Fruehauf A.Ş. Later in 2002, with its experience in public transportation, Otokar developed the Navigo small bus which is marketed in Turkey under the Sultan brand. In 2003, Otokar initiated cooperation with Singapore Technologies Kinetics (STK) for the new 8x8 tactical armoured vehicle Otokar Yavuz. In 2005 Otokar expanded its line of armoured vehicles.

In 2007, the Subsecretary for Defence Industries of Turkey launched negotiations with Otokar on the eventual contractual agreement to develop and produce Turkey's first national tank.

In 2011, Otokar achieved 890,000,000 TL turnover, 72% higher than 2010. Mostly due to civil products, sales were extended to European countries, leading to the establishment of the Otokar European office. The company introduced the Arma 8x8 ACV, Arma 6x6 EOD, Mizrak RCT and exhibited Altay MBT's early prototype in 2011.

As of 2019, Otokar products are actively used in 60 countries with 300 support and sales points.

== Vehicles ==
=== Minibuses ===
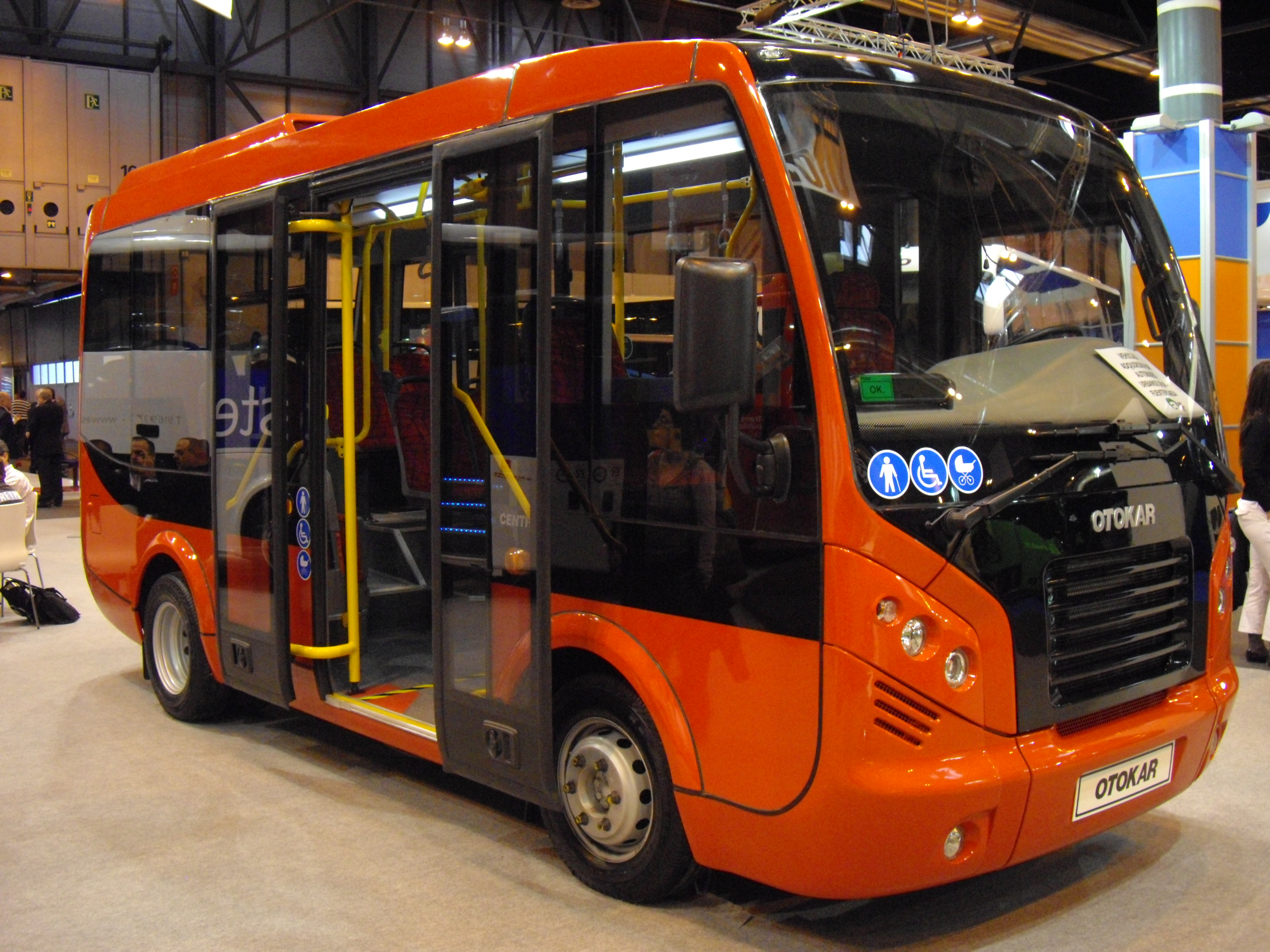
Otokar Centro minibus at the 2010 FIAA in Madrid, Spain.

Centro

Otokar produces the famous Deutz F4L912-powered, 80S minibuses based on the TAM 80T50 light truck. They have held the largest percentage by far among all dolmuşes (share taxis) in Istanbul and Ankara since their introduction in the 1970s. These 14-seat minibuses are particularly known for their cubic shape, durability, long life expectancy, and low operation costs. M-2000, M-3000, and M-2010 were the latest models from this series, which began some time ago under a different coding system. Initially, the vehicles were named Magirus after their engines, but as the company built confidence among its customers, the company started using their own brand name. The last member of the series, M-2010 has an Iveco engine, the first time Deutz engines were abandoned in this series.

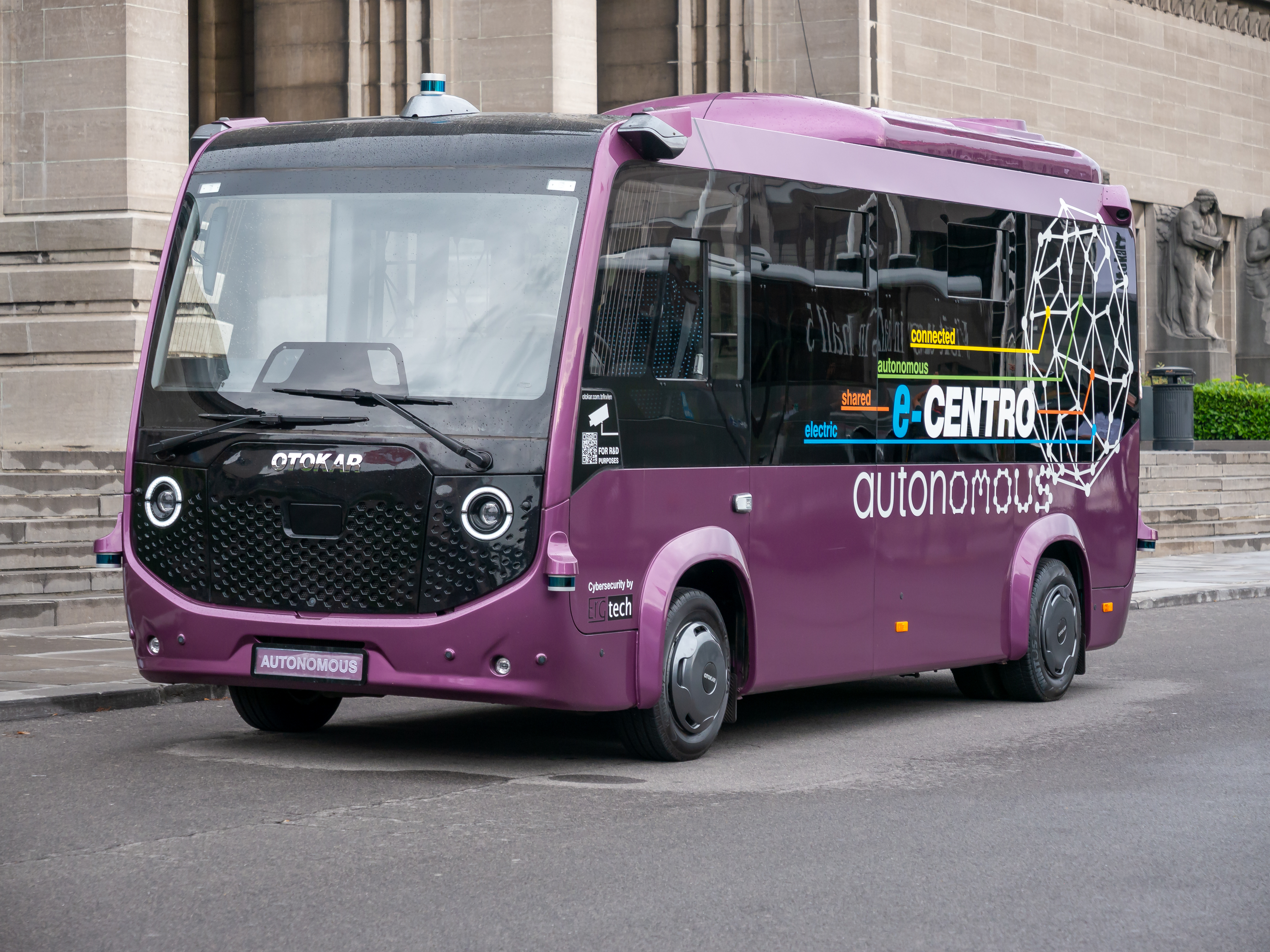
Autonomous minibus e-Centro

=== Buses ===
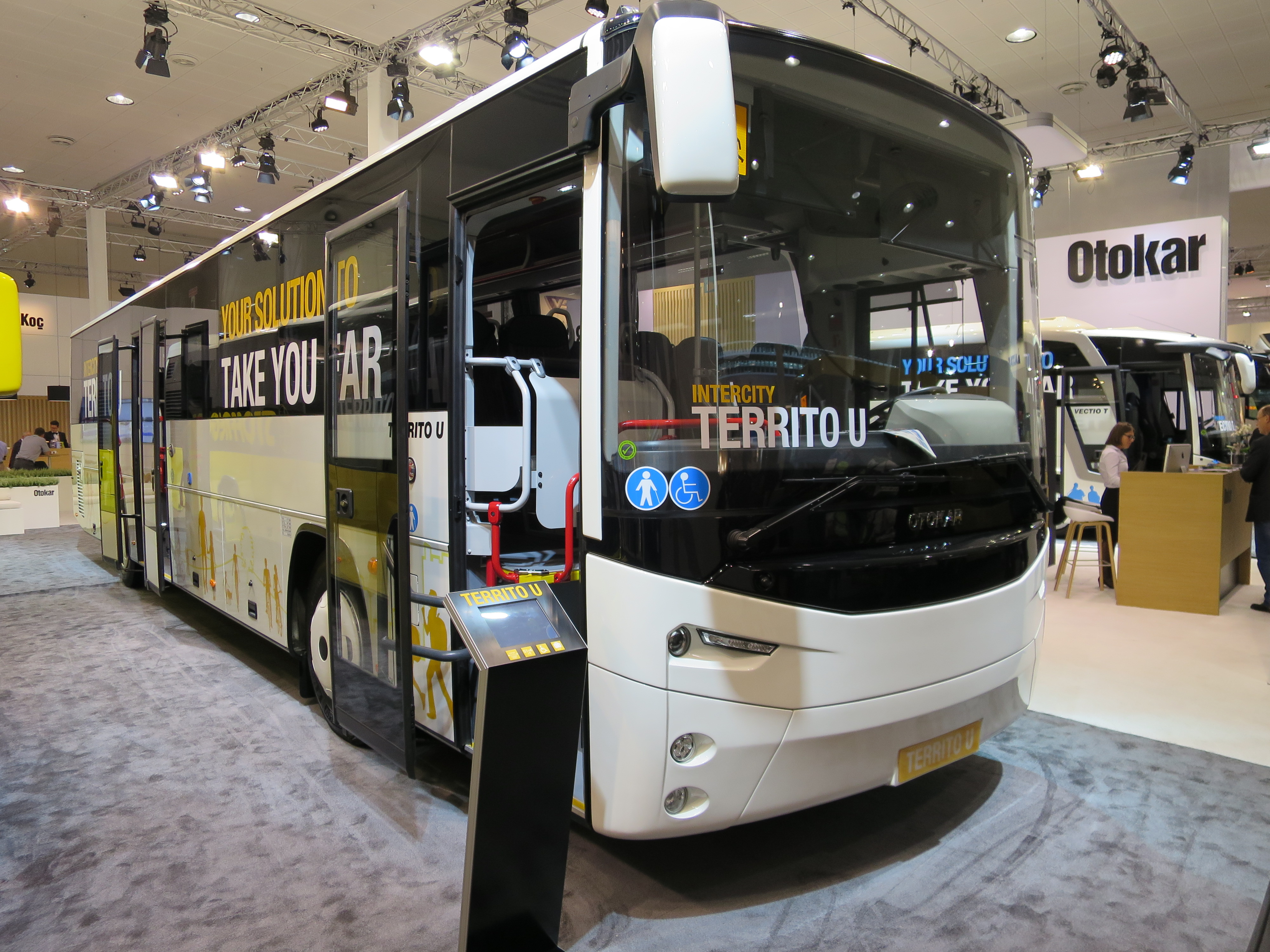
Otokar Territo U

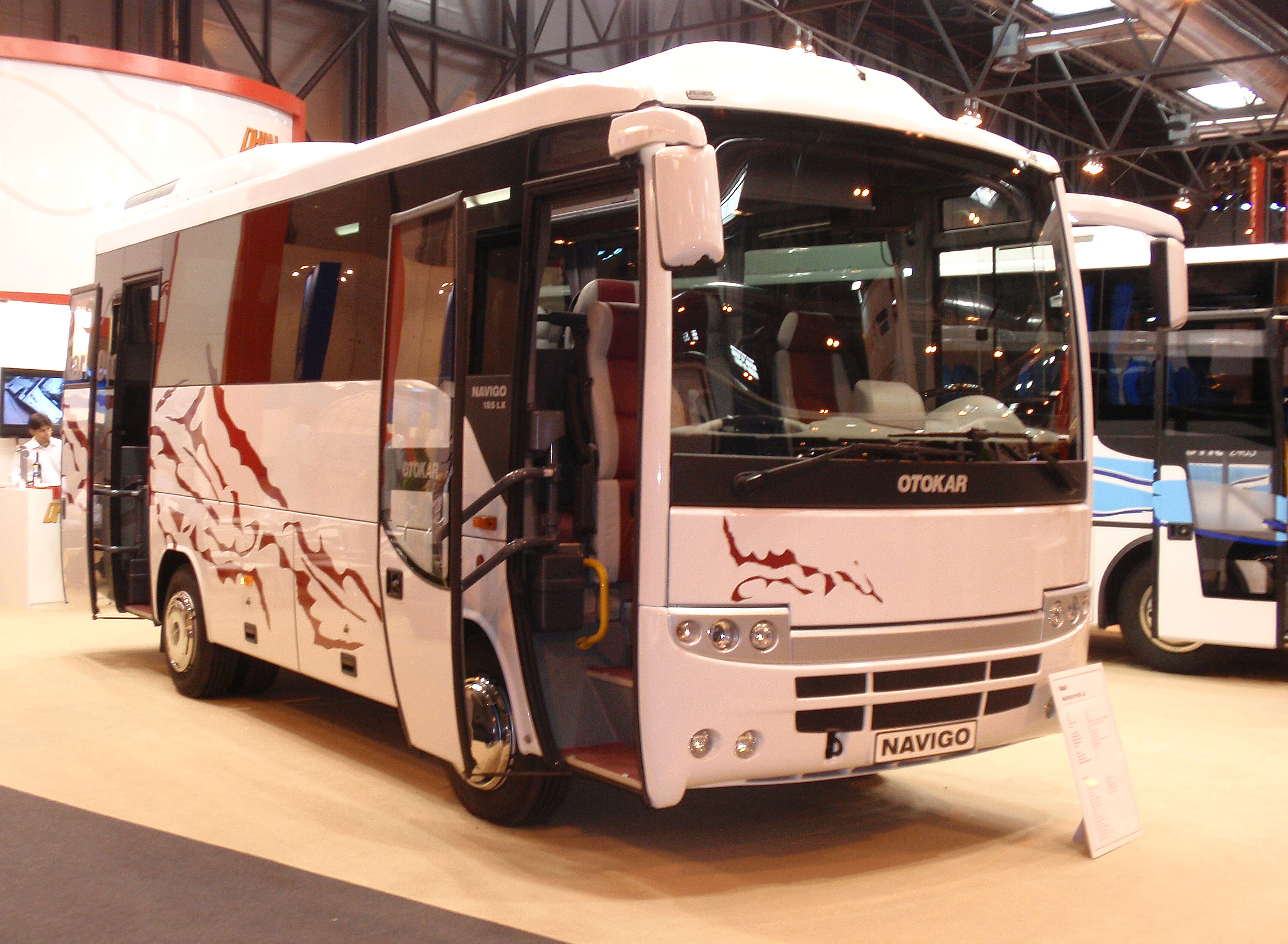
Otokar Navigo at the 2008 FIAA in Madrid

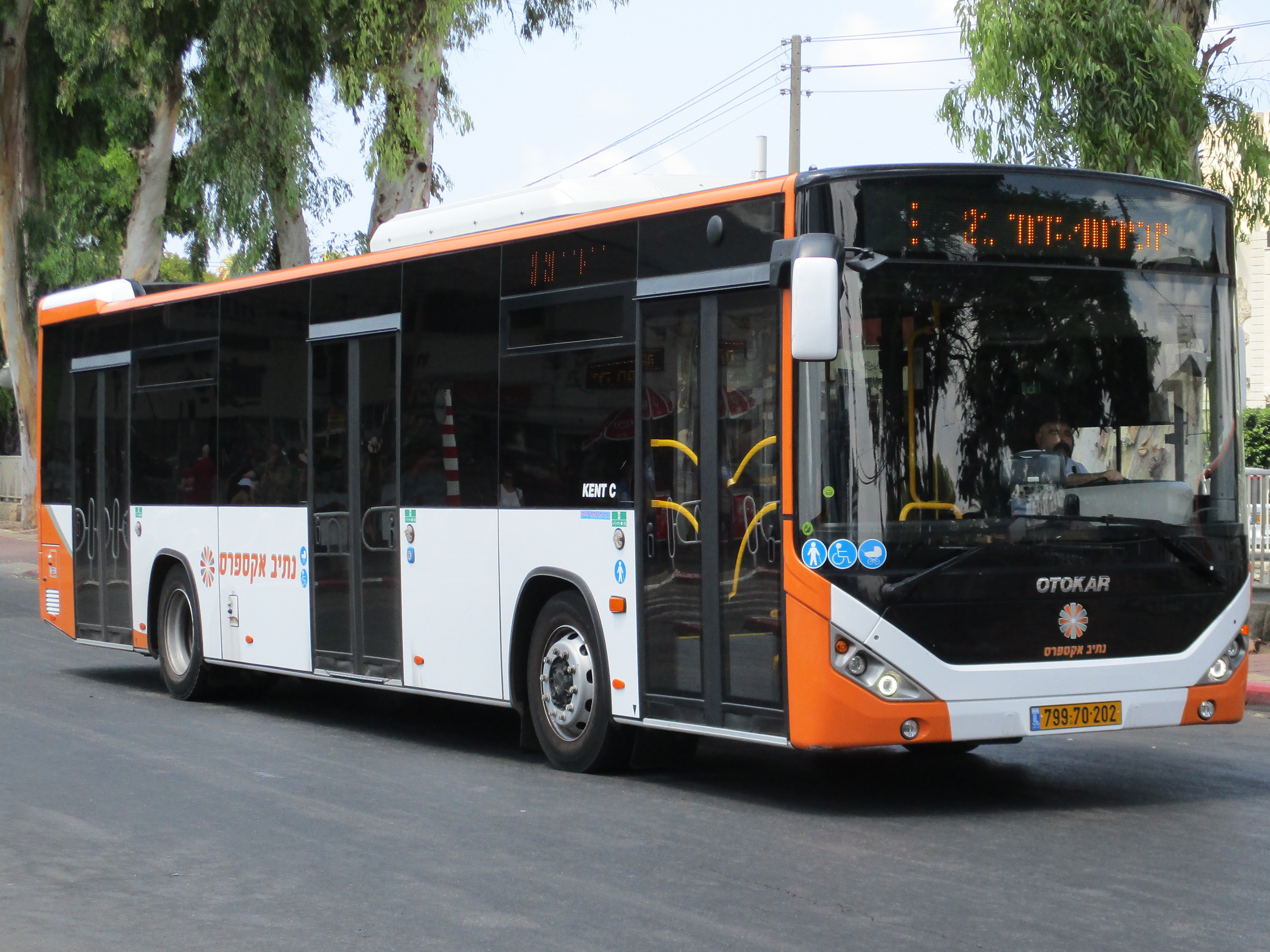
Otokar Kent C

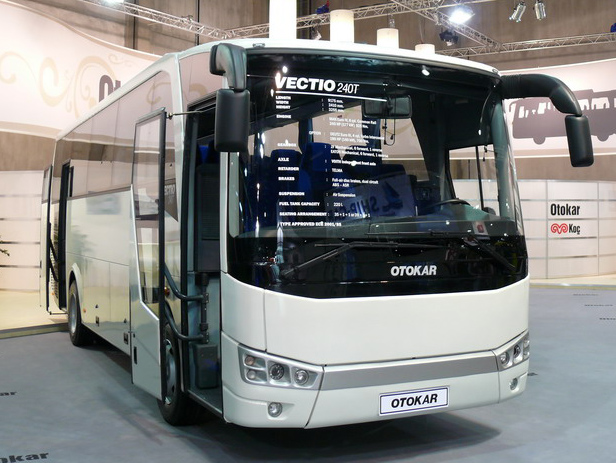
Otokar Vectio at the Busworld 2007 exhibition in Kortrijk, Belgium

Navigo

Otokar manufactures several buses for civilian mass transit use. Its line of Navigo buses range from the Navigo 125L with 25 seats and 6.3 m in length to the Navigo 160SE with 31 seats at 7.1 m in length. All small bus models use a 4.4L Cummins 145 PS Euro 6 diesel engine. The Navigo is marketed as the Sultan in Turkey. The larger, more luxurious models have a 45-litre refrigerator, hostess seat, announcement system, optional additional heater and optional double-layer glass, DVD, VCD, MP3 player and LCD TV systems.

Doruk and Vectio

Since April 2007, Otokar has also started to manufacture a new 9-meter, rear-engined bus called Doruk in Turkey and Vectio in other markets.

Otokar is the bus supplier for Inter Trust of Bulgaria.

In February 2020, Otokar signed an agreement with Iveco Bus for production of Iveco Buses in Turkey.

Kent

Kent is the low floor full-size bus line-up of Otokar used by many operators. It also features a E-Kent electric bus and a Kent XL metrobus.

=== Trailers and superstructures ===
Otokar manufactures a wide variety of trailers and superstructures for carrying textiles, refrigerated foods, heavy mechanical goods, hazardous materials, and motor vehicles.

=== Utility ===
Otokar, under the Land Rover license, produced several Land Rover variants and models until 2016. These include the Land Rover Defender 90, Defender 110, and Defender 130 for use as utility, ambulance, and rescue vehicles.

=== Military ===
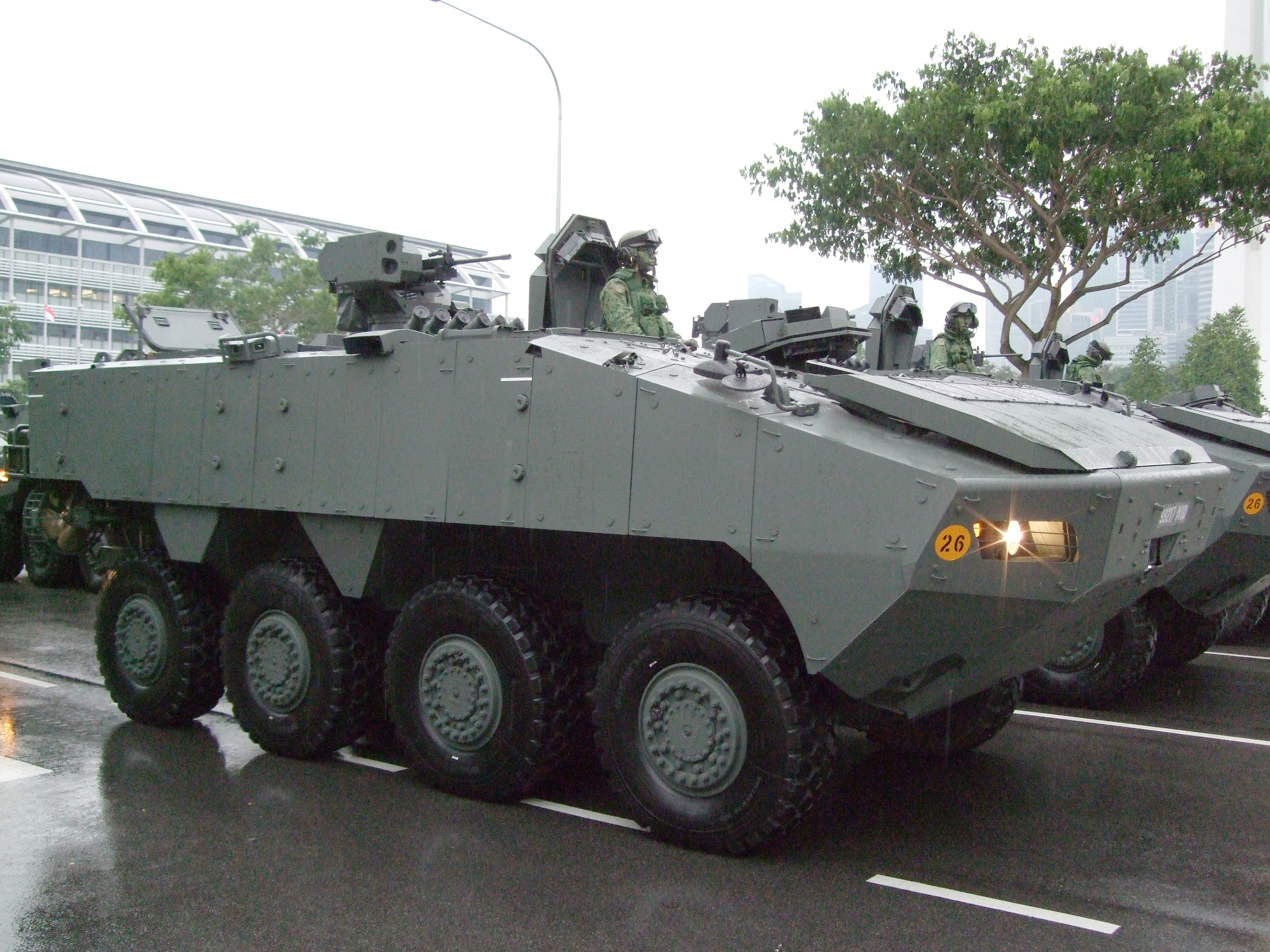
Otokar Yavuz

Otokar produces wheeled military vehicles for the Turkish Armed Forces as well as other countries.

- Altay MBT—the Turkish national main battle tank
- Alpar-heavy-class unmanned ground vehicle.
- Otokar Arma—6x6/8x8 wheeled-armoured vehicle.
- Otokar Armoured Internal Security Vehicle—for usage in urban and residential areas with variants equipped as command vehicles, personnel carriers, explosive ordnance disposal vehicles, reconnaissance/surveillance vehicles, and water cannon vehicles.
- Otokar Armoured Patrol Vehicle (APV)—a versatile 4x4 armoured vehicle adaptable to a wide range of military and security roles. Exported to Bahrain, Bangladesh, Algeria, Iraq and Pakistan.
- Otokar Akrep—a 4x4 special attack/defense vehicle.
- Otokar Akrep II—an electric-drive 4x4 special attack/defense vehicle, further development of the Akrep.
- Otokar Cobra, Cobra II—4x4 infantry mobility vehicles
- Otokar Discreetly Armoured Station Wagon—looks like a standard vehicle but features an armoured body structure that meets military standards as well as superior road and cross-country capabilities.
- Otokar Engerek—a fast attack vehicle based on the Land Rover 110.
- Otokar Kale—a mine-resistant ambush protected vehicle (MRAP) which provides enhanced mine and ballistic protection along with independent suspension system ensuring superior mobility in a wide range of demanding terrains under diverse climatic conditions.
- Tulpar (IFV)—tracked armoured infantry fighting vehicle designed to provide ballistic and mine protection to support new generation main battle tanks on the battlefield and to provide fire support for infantry.
- Otokar Ural—armoured personnel carrier with a versatile modular platform and an innovative feature set.
- Otokar/Land Rover—40 variants of the Defender 90, 110, and 130.
- Otokar Yavuz—8x8 armoured personnel carrier; the design is based on the AV-81 Terrex.

=== Former ===
- Otokar 80S5.5 (1990–2000)
- Otokar M-2000 (2000–2010)
- Otokar M-3000 (2008–2011)
- Otokar M-2010 (2009–2014)
- Land Rover Defender (1984–2016)

== See also ==
- Otokar Cobra
- GA

== Sources ==
- Otokar website (in Turkish)
- History of Otokar
- Company Profile
- Article about Turkish Defense companies
