= Turkmen National Guard =

Elite branch of the Armed Forces of Turkmenistan stationed in Ashgabat

The National Guard of Turkmenistan (Turkmen: Türkmenistanyň Milli Garawul) is an elite branch of the Armed Forces of Turkmenistan stationed in Ashgabat. It is one of three types of paramilitary forces in the country, with the other two being the Turkmen Internal Troops and the Turkmen Border Troops. The main task of the troops of the national guard is to protect the President of Turkmenistan and other senior government officials, as well as to provide security to state facilities. The National Guard is made up of 700-1000 soldiers of the armed forces. It was created in August 1992 following the creation of the Ministry of Defense of Turkmenistan in January of that year.
