= Otokar Kale =

Light tactical military vehicle

- Type: MRAP
- Place of origin: Turkey

Production history
- Designer: Otokar
- Manufacturer: Otokar

Specifications
- Mass: 16000kg
- Length: 6.9 m
- Width: 2.57 m
- Height: 2.74 m
- Crew: 3
- Passengers: 13
- Engine: 8.9 L 6 Cylinder; 296 HP
- Transmission: 7 Speed automatic
- Maximum speed: 100 km/h

Otokar KALE (Turkish for "Fortress") is a Mine-Resistant Ambush Protected Personnel Carrier.

It is manufactured by Otokar Otomotiv ve Savunma Sanayi A.Ş. (simply Otokar), a Turkish military vehicles manufacturer headquartered in headquartered in Sakarya, Turkey.

It was first unveiled in 2014

== Design ==
Kale provides enhanced mine and ballistic protection against improvised explosive devices (IEDs), as well as small arms fire and shell splinters. The independent suspension system ensuring superior mobility in a wide range of demanding terrains under diverse climatic conditions. Kale carries up to thirteen people in addition to the driver, commander and gunner.

Kale can be fitted with a protected weapon station (PWS) or RWS armed with a 7.62mm or .50in machine gun, plus banks of 76mm grenade launchers.
