= Turkmen Air Force =

Air force branch of the armed forces of Turkmenistan

- Türkmen Howa Güýçleri (Turkmen)
- Turkmen Air Force roundel
- Founded: 1992; 34 years ago
- Country: Turkmenistan
- Type: Air force
- Role: Aerial warfare
- Size: 3,000 personnel 91 aircraft
- Part of: Turkmen Armed Forces
- Headquarters: Ashgabat
- Colours: Yellow, Blue, White

Commanders
- Supreme Commander-in-Chief: President Serdar Berdimuhamedow
- Commander of the Turkmen Air Force: Colonel Ali Muhammetow

Insignia
- Roundel

- Flag

Aircraft flown
- Attack: Embraer EMB 314 Super Tucano, M-346 Master, Su-25
- Fighter: MiG-29
- Helicopter: Mil Mi-17, AW109
- Attack helicopter: Mil Mi-24
- Transport: Antonov An-26, Antonov An-74, Alenia C-27J Spartan

The Turkmen Air Force (Turkmen: Türkmen Howa Güýçleri) is the air force branch of the Armed Forces of Turkmenistan. It was formed from former Soviet Air Forces units within that region of the Turkestan Military District. The Turkmen Air Force inherited some 300 Soviet aircraft, and has pilots trained in Ukraine.

== History ==
After the division of the Turkestan Military District of the Soviet Armed Forces between the independent states of Central Asia, Turkmenistan inherited the largest aviation group in Central Asia, deployed at two large bases: one near Mary and one near Ashgabat. In the 1990s, the Turkmen Air Force took over operation of Krasnovodsk Air Base (now Turkmenbashi International Airport), which was an interceptor aircraft facility for the Soviet Air Force. Among the former units of the Soviet Air Forces in Turkmenistan were the following: 67th Mixed Aviation Regiment, 366th Independent Helicopter Squadron, 179th Fighter Aviation Regiment, 217th Fighter/Bomber Aviation Regiment. In 2002, the Air Force was armed with up to 250 helicopters and aircraft of various systems. There were plans to strengthen the coastal naval force in 2015, which resulted in a moderate improvement in the Caspian Sea presence.

== Organization ==
- 99th Aviation Base (Mary-2 airbase) with MiG-29 and Su-25.
- 47th Separate Mixed Aviation Squadron (Аk-Tepe/Ashkabad) with Аn-26/24, Mi-24 and Mi-8.
- 107th Fighter Aviation Regiment (Ak-Tepe) with 38 MiG-23 and 20 MiG-25 (not operational).
- 31st Separate Aviation Squadron (Chardzhou/Turkmenabad) with MiG-21, Su-7, L-39, Yak-28 and Аn-12 (not operational).
- 55th Fighter Aviation Regiment (Balkanabat) with MiG-23М (not operational).
- 56th Storage Base (Kyzyl-Arvat) with MiG-23.
- 1st Anti-Aircraft Missile Regiment 'Turkmenbashi' (Bikrova/Ashkabad) with 2K11 Krug
- 2nd Radio-Technical Brigade

== Air Bases ==
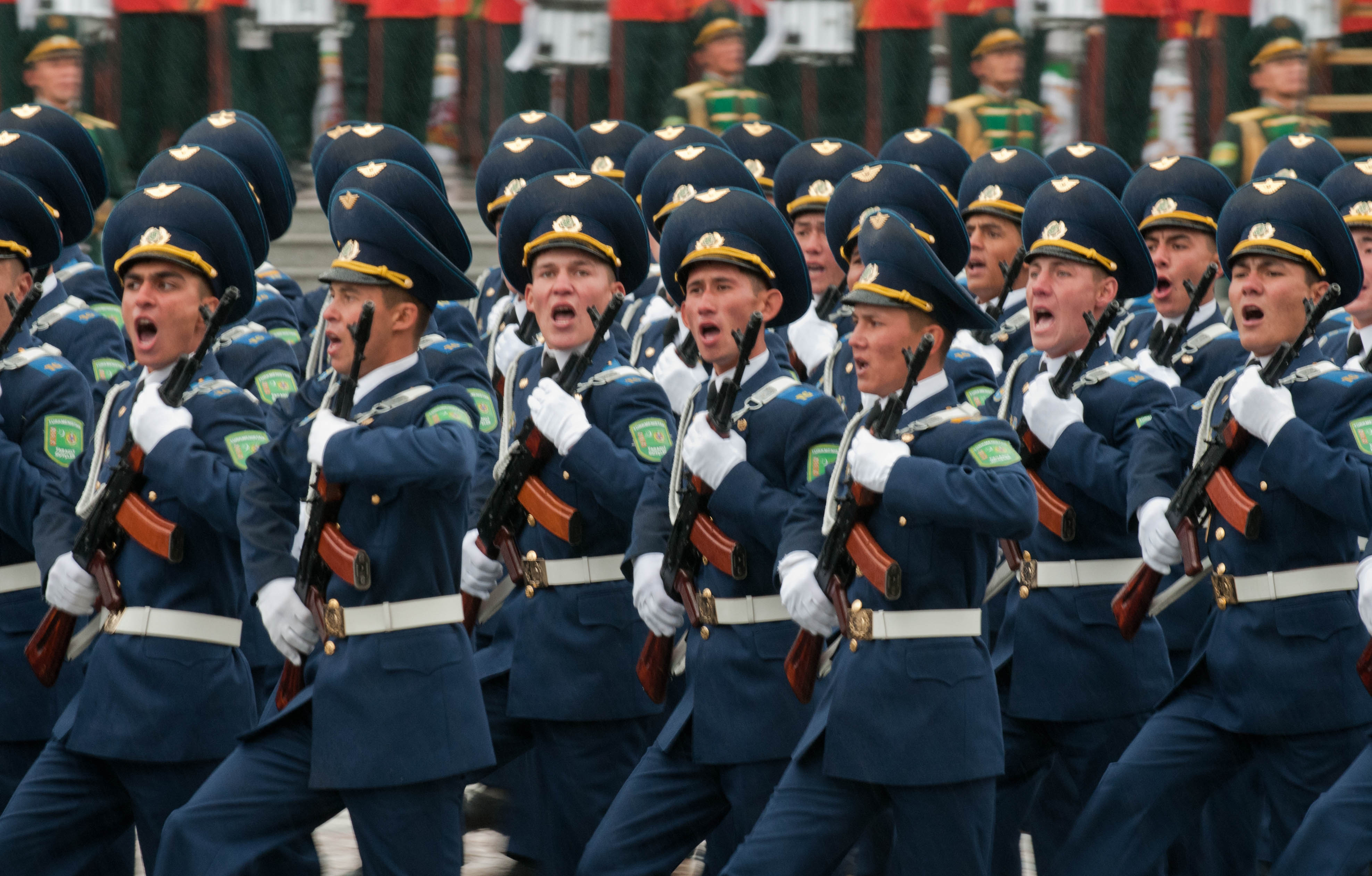
Personnel of the Air Force

=== Akdepe Airdrome ===
Akdepe Airdrome is the main airfield of the air force, located in Ashgabat. The border troops of Turkmenistan use the airfield for their own aircraft. In June 2008, President of Turkmenistan Gurbanguly Berdimuhammedov flew over the capital of the country on a MiG-29 supersonic combat aircraft after visiting the airfield.

Around 2015, conditions for local flights at the military airfield began to be prepared for the 2017 Asian Indoor and Martial Arts Games.

=== Mary-2 Airfield ===
Mary-2 airbase is located north of the city of Mary. In the Soviet era, it hosted two Tu-22M3 squadrons from the 185th Guards Heavy Bomber Aviation Regiment. During the withdrawal of Soviet troops from Afghanistan, these two squadrons bombed the Afghan Mujahideen during the Panjshir offensives of the Soviet 40th Army. In early 1989, the last of these squadrons left the Mary-2 airfield and returned to their places of permanent deployment. The long runway Mary-2 can accommodate all types of aircraft, including heavy transport aircraft and strategic bombers. During the Iraq War, it was speculated that the airbase would be used to host United States Army equipment from the Karshi-Khanabad Air Base in neighboring Uzbekistan. In September 2004, a representative of the military attaché of the U.S. visited the Mary-2 airfield, and at around the same time, construction companies from the United Arab Emirates began work at the airfield to bring the facility to a state of full readiness for operation.

Briefly during the Soviet period the Mary-2 airbase housed an aggressor squadron used for training Soviet fighter pilots in aerial combat, akin to the United States Navy's Top Gun school.

== Aircraft ==
The IISS in 2012 said the Air Force had 3,000 personnel with 94 combat capable aircraft.

The total number of aircraft was 97 in 2020.

=== Current inventory ===
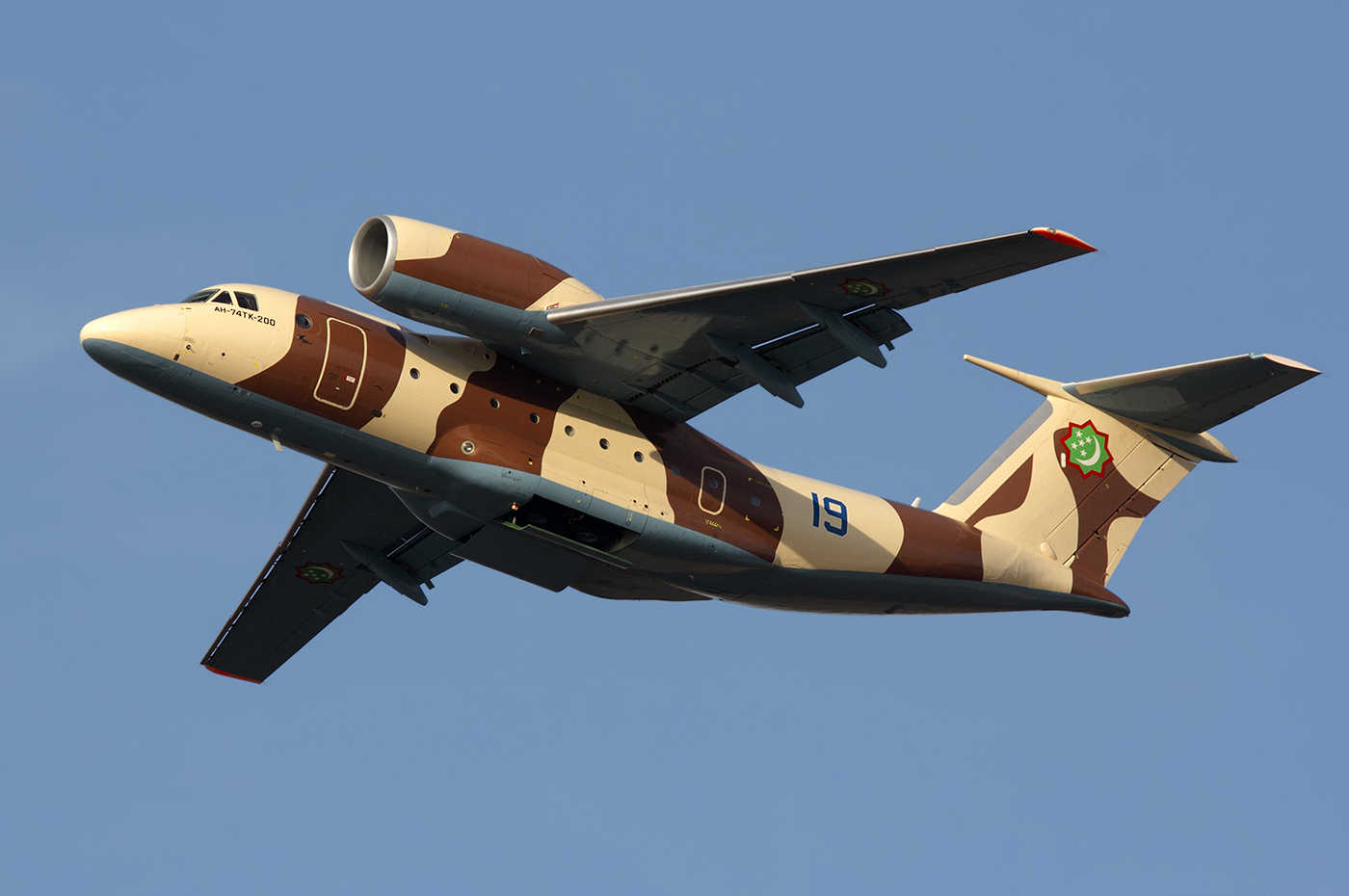
An Air Force Antonov An-74TK-200

Aircraft	Origin	Type	Variant	In service	Notes
Combat aircraft
A-29 Super Tucano	Brazil	Attack	A-29B	5	
M-346 Master	Italy	Light combat aircraft	M-346FA	4	
Mikoyan MiG-29	Soviet Union	Multirole		22	
Sukhoi Su-25	Soviet Union	Attack		18	
Transport
Antonov An-26	Soviet Union	Transport		1	
Antonov An-74	Soviet Union	Transport		2	STOL capable aircraft
C-27J Spartan	Italy	Transport		2	
Helicopters
AgustaWestland AW109	Italy	Utility		1	
AgustaWestland AW139	Italy / United Kingdom	Utility			8 on order
Mil Mi-17	Soviet Union	Utility		15	
Mil Mi-24	Soviet Union	Attack		10	
Trainers
M-346 Master	Italy	Jet trainer	M-346FT	2	
Sukhoi Su-25	Soviet Union	Jet trainer	Su-25UB	7	
Mikoyan MiG-29	Soviet Union	Jet trainer	MiG-29UB	2	

Aircraft	Origin	Type	Variant	In service	Notes
Unmanned aerial vehicles
Selex ES Falco	Italy / Pakistan	Reconnaissance		3	
Bayraktar TB2	Turkey	UCAV		6	
CASIC WJ	China	UCAV	WJ-600 A/D		
CASC Rainbow	China	UCAV	CH-3A		

=== Retired aircraft ===
At an unknown point in time, there were two fighter/ground attack squadrons with MiG-29/MiG-29UB (total of 24 both types), Sukhoi Su-17 Fitter-Bs (65), two Sukhoi Su-25 Frogfoots (with 41 more being refurbished) and twenty three Sukhoi Su-24 (which staying at Ashgabat air field). Also it was reported one transport squadron with Antonov An-26 'Curl' (1), and Mi-8s and Mi-24s (8 and 10 listed in service respectively). Training units had Sukhoi Su-7 Fitter-As (3 listed in service) and L-39 Albatros. Air defence missile units had SA-2, SA-3, and SA-5.

Retired aircraft include MiG-25 and Eurocopter AS365 Dauphin.

== Commanders ==
- Lieutenant General Serdar Charyyarov (1994–2002)
- Colonel Gurbanguly Gurbangulyyev (2004–2010)
