= Isgender Mulikov =

Turkmen politician (born 1975)

Isgender Handurdiyevich Mulikov (Turkmen: Isgender Handurdyýewiç Mülikow, Исгендер Xaндурдыевич Mүликов) is a Turkmen politician who was Minister of Internal Affairs from 2009 to 2019.

== Biography ==
Mulikov was born in the city of Ashgabat in 1975. In 1996, he graduated from the Higher School of the Ministry of Internal Affairs, with a degree in law. He then began working in various positions in structural divisions of the Ministry of Internal Affairs. Until February 2009, he worked as Deputy Minister of Internal Affairs. From 27 February to May 2009, he was the head of the Police Department of Dashoguz. On 29 May 2009, he became the Minister of Internal Affairs by a separate decree of President Gurbanguly Berdimuhamedow, and was appointed to the special rank of lieutenant colonel of police at the same time. In November 2009, he received a severe reprimand, the first of 12 over his career. He was reappointed minister on 28 February 2012 with rank of major general. In April 2013 he was demoted to colonel for improper management of subordinate units. Mulikov's rank as a major general was subsequently restored, and he was promoted to lieutenant general of police in June 2018.

He was fired as minister of internal affairs on 1 October 2019. In dismissing Mulikov on national television, President Berdimuhamedow publicly ridiculed Mulikov, stripped him of his awards, and demoted him to the rank of major of police. That same day, Mulikov was arrested. He was convicted on 19 October, and in December sentenced to 25 years in prison for accepting bribes and expropriation of private property. His public confession of guilt was broadcast on national television on 3 December 2019.

In November 2020, a confiscated house believed to have belonged to Mulikov was advertised for sale by the Ashgabat mayor's office.

=== Accusations ===
The following accusations were leveled publicly against Mulikov as justification for his dismissal:

- Mulikov appointed a veterinarian, Berdimyrat Berdiýew, as acting director of a prison in Ahal Province;
- A traffic police captain, Kerimguly Çaryew, was apprehended for misuse of his official vehicle, including transportation of Ashgabat municipal public utility workers;
- Traffic police inspectors were found to be corrupt, including demanding bribes and threatening to confiscate automobiles without cause, and obstructing prosecution of friends;
- An entrepreneur allegedly close to Mulikov, Çarymuhammed Kulow, was convicted of accepting unusually large bribes;
- Mulikov declined to dismiss a deputy head of the Ashgabat passport division, Didamyrat Muhammedow, who is related to Kulow.

Mulikov's personal chauffeur, Maksat Amanow, was reportedly arrested before Mulikov was. Amanow was allegedly the intermediary between Mulikov and Kulow, who in turn was allegedly responsible for managing Mulikov's business interests. These business interests reportedly included "several restaurants, cafes and stores in Ashgabat." Independent media reported confiscation of the Okean Restaurant, Ayperi Cafe, and Turkish Dishes Cafe.

An opposition newspaper reported that Mulikov was found guilty on 19 October 2019 of violating the following articles of the penal code:

- Article 181, part 2 — Misuse of official position, causing serious consequences;
- Article 181(1), part 2 — Violating the oath of office through misuse of official position, if that action was done out of greed or in other personal interests and caused significant violation of rights and freedoms of citizens, the statutory interests of society and the state;
- Article 184, part 2, subparagraphs «a», «v» и «d» — Acceptance of a bribe (repeatedly, by an official occupying a position of responsibility, in large amount);
- Article 184, part 3, paragraph «а» — Acceptance of a bribe (in unusually large amount).

Mulikov confessed on television to accepting bribes and expropriating houses, both felonies. All of Mulikov's ill-gotten properties were reportedly confiscated by the government. These included "illegally acquired residential houses, possessions in them, automobiles, and various valuables."

Mulikov was also accused privately of too close association with Kulow, who allegedly expressed intent to succeed President Berdimuhammedow during the latter's temporary disappearance from public view in 2019. This, rather than corruption, was allegedly the real reason for Mulikov's downfall.

== Decorations ==
- Edermenlik (Courage) Medal (2009)
- Birkemsiz gullugy üçin (For Irreproachable Service), III class (2010)
- Birkemsiz gullugy üçin (For Irreproachable Service), II class (2014)
- Commemorative Medal in Honor of 19th Anniversary of Turkmenistan Independence
- Mälikguly Berdimuhamedow Medal (2017)

== Reprimands ==
Over Mulikov's career, he received 12 severe reprimands (Turkmen: berk käýinç / берк кәйинч; Russian: строгий выговор), including 3 "with final warning". Among them are:

1. 18 November 2009 — severe reprimand "for unsatisfactory management of internal affairs units, inappropriate organization of personnel assignment work, as well as low level of implementing assignments".
2. In March 2010 – severe reprimand "for unsatisfactory management of internal affairs units, inappropriate organization of personnel assignment work, as well as low level of implementing assignments".
3. In April 2011 – severe reprimand "for inadequacies committed in the organization of activity of the traffic police service".
4. In September 2012 – severe reprimand "for unsatisfactory implementation of service responsibilities, weakening of control of activity of subordinate units".
5. In September 2014 – severe reprimand "for unsatisfactory implementation of service responsibilities, weakening of control of activity of subordinate units"
6. In December 2016 – severe reprimand with warning "for unsatisfactory implementation of service responsibilities, nonperformance of assignments from the head of government to assure fire safety".
7. 4 May 2017 – severe reprimand "for unsatisfactory implementation of service responsibilities, weakening of discipline of personal staff of the agency he headed".
8. In June 2017 – severe reprimand "for unsatisfactory implementation of service responsibilities, inadequacies committed in work".
9. In August 2017 – severe reprimand "for weakening of control of activity of subordinate units".
10. 10 January 2018 – severe reprimand with final warning "for unsatisfactory implementation of service responsibilities, inappropriate selection and assignment of personnel".
11. 27 April 2018 – severe reprimand with final warning "for unsatisfactory implementation of service responsibilities, weakening of control of order and discipline of subordinate units".
12. 4 April 2019 – severe reprimand with final warning "for unsatisfactory implementation of service responsibilities, inadequacies committed in work".

In addition to reprimands, on 2 November 2016 Turkmenistan President Gurbanguly Berdimuhamedow "expressed serious dissatisfaction with the work of I. Mulikov" during a session of the State Security Council. Mulikov was demoted twice, as well.

== Promotion and demotion history ==
- 29 May 2009 – appointed minister of internal affairs of Turkmenistan, with special rank of lieutenant colonel of police
- 23 February 2012 – reappointed minister of internal affairs of Turkmenistan, with special rank of major general of police
- 17 April 2013 – demoted from major general of police to colonel
- 23 February 2017 – reappointed minister of internal affairs of Turkmenistan with special rank of major general of police
- 13 June 2018 – promoted from major general to lieutenant general of police
- 1 October 2019 – dismissed from post of minister of internal affairs, stripped of awards, and demoted from lieutenant general to major
