= Turkmen Internal Troops =

Service branch of the Armed Forces of Turkmenistan

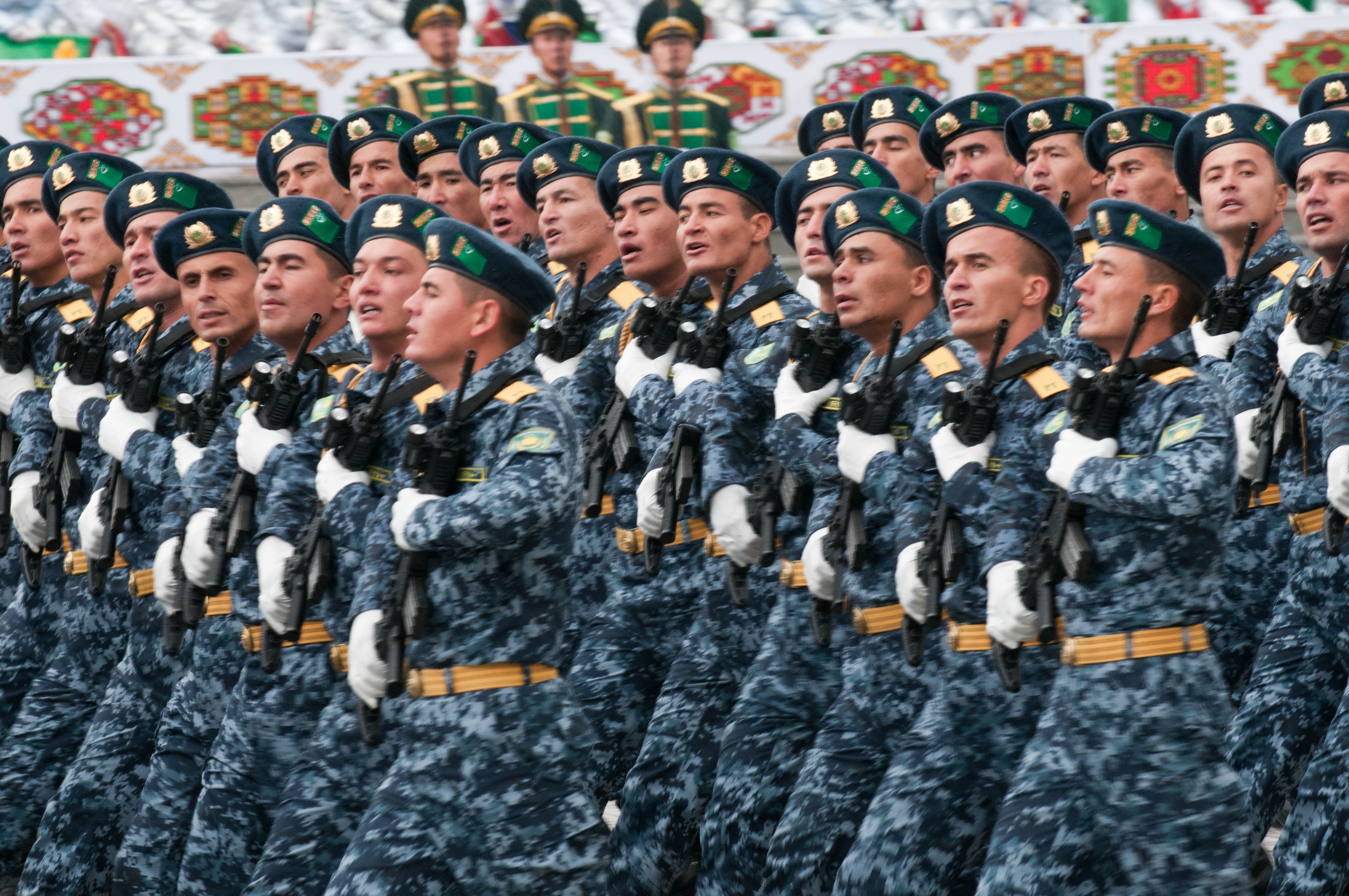
Internal Troops during a military parade in Ashgabat, 2011.

The Internal Troops of Turkmenistan (Turkmen: Türkmenistanyň içerki goşunlary) is a service branch of the Armed Forces of Turkmenistan under the auspices of the Ministry of Internal Affairs. It is one of three types of paramilitary forces in the country, with the other two being the Turkmen National Guard and the Turkmen Border Troops. It is designed to maintain law and order and enforce the status quo in terms of state sovereignty. It aides the Turkmen National Police in everyday activities, similarly to the Military Police Corps in the United States Army.

In an operational view, the internal troops are organized similarly to the Turkmen Ground Forces, both consisting of sub-units. The Internal Troops consists of between 20,000 and 25,000 personnel.

== Tasks ==
The main tasks of the Internal Troops since its establishment in January 1992 have been:

- Protect the rights and freedoms of citizens and ensure their personal security
- Enforce the law and keep public order
- Suppress and/or eradicate criminal offenses caused by high-profile criminals
- Investigate high-profile crimes
- Ensure road safety and compliance with road laws

== Military Unit 1001 ==
The Military Unit 1001 named after Mälikguly Berdimuhamedow is one of the more notable units of the Internal Troops. Located in Ashgabat, it is named in honour of Mälikguly Berdimuhamedowiç Berdimuhamedow (renamed by order of Assembly Chairman Akja Nurberdiýewa in 2012), a former Colonel of Police in a prison guard detachment and the father of the current President of Turkmenistan Gurbanguly Berdimuhamedow. His old office was recreated at the barracks of the unit as well as museum. In 2013, a life-time bust was installed on the territory of the complex of buildings of the military unit. According to a former serviceman in the unit, commanders have extorted money from soldiers, being forced to pay 400 manats for a characterization issued after the end of military service.

== See also ==
- Armed Forces of Turkmenistan
- National Guard
