= YLC-6 Radar =

Chinese military radar

YLC-6 is a series of two-dimensional radars from Nanjing Research Institute of Electronics Technology (NRIET) for mobile and static medium- and low-altitude surveillance.

== Specifications ==
- S-band
- Coverage (¦Ò= 2m^{2}, Pd=0.8, Pf=10-6)
- Range: <150 km
- Elevation: 0¡«40¡ã
- Height: 10,000 m
- Mobility:
  - Set-up time: 8 min.
  - Tear-down time: 6 min.
- Other features
  - Fully coherent solid state transmitter
  - Low side-lobe antenna
  - Dual-channel receiver (redundancy backup)
  - Digital signal processor
  - Automatic hydraulic leveling, automatic north alignment & GPS

== Exports ==
- Bangladesh
- Egypt
- Pakistan
- Syria
