= Otokar Ural =

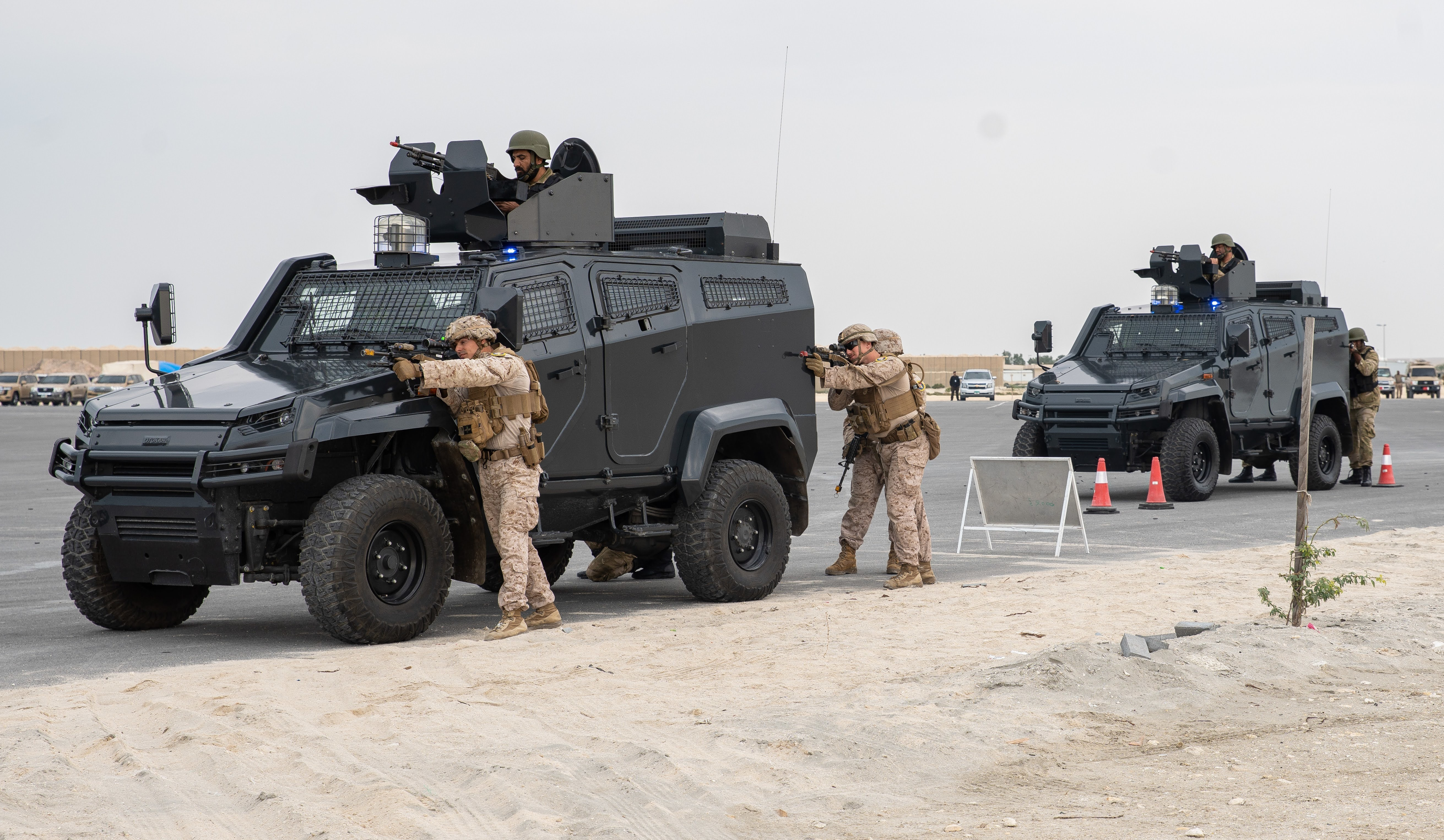
- Bahrain Defence Force Otokar Urals during the Neon Defender 23 final exercise in Bahrain.
- Type: Armored Vehicle
- Place of origin: Turkey

Service history
- Used by: See Operators

Production history
- Designer: Otokar
- Manufacturer: Otokar
- No. built: 126

Specifications
- Mass: 6300kg
- Length: 5.3m
- Width: 2.2m
- Height: 2.2m
- Engine: 168HP
- Transmission: Automatic, 6 forward- 1 reverse
- Operational range: 600km
- Maximum speed: Max Speed 100km/h

Otokar URAL is a 4x4 armoured vehicle designed for police, law enforcement and paramilitary forces.

It is manufactured by Otokar Otomotiv ve Savunma Sanayi A.Ş (simply Otokar), a Turkish military vehicles manufacturer headquartered in Sakarya, Turkey.

It was first unveiled at IDEF 2013

== Design ==
Based on a modular platform, its design enables it to be configured with a variety of different weapons/equipment enabling it to perform a variety of missions. In Eurosatory 2014, it was displayed with an Otokar designed, remotely controlled stabilized weapon station compromising of a 7.62mm/5.56mm machine gun designed for infantry fighting vehicles. Depending on configuration, it can carry up to 9 troops.

== Operators ==
- Bahrain: In use with Royal Bahraini Army.
- Ecuador: 15 units purchased in 2023 to be operated by National Police of Ecuador in counter-terrorist and narcotics operations.
- Ivory Coast: Operated by National Gendarmerie.
- Turkey: 126 vehicles delivered to The General Directorate of Security (Turkish: Emniyet Genel Müdürlüğü, EGM), the civilian police force responsible for law enforcement in Turkey.
- Turkmenistan: Operated by Ministry of Internal Affairs.
