= China Electronics Technology Group Corporation 14th Research Institute =

China Electronics Technology Group Corporation 14th Research Institute (中国电子科技集团公司第十四研究所), or Nanjing Research Institute of Electronics Technology (南京电子技术研究所, NRIET), was established in 1949 in Nanjing, China. As the cradle of China's radar industry, it is a research institute of comprehensive electronics technology that covers the early-warning and surveillance of land, sea, and airspace. The research institute creates a platform that provides military products as its primary task while also forming a platform that provides civilian products under the name of Guorui Group (国睿集团).

== Main Products ==
- YLC-2 Radar
- YLC-4 Radar
- YLC-6 Radar
- YLC-8 Radar
- YLC-15 Radar
- Type 346 radar
- Type 1475 Radar
- Shaanxi KJ-2000 Radar
- KLJ-7
