= Hutchinson Industries =

American military manufacturer

- Founded: 1853
- Headquarters: Trenton, New Jersey
- Key people: Andy Barker, CEO
- Website: hutchinsoninc.com

Hutchinson Industries is a Trenton, New Jersey–based military manufacturer that produces run-flat tires and machines for the United States Armed Forces. The company was founded in 1853 by Hiram Hutchinson.

Hutchinson Industries is a specialized American subsidiary of the french-based company Hutchinson SA.

== History ==
In 1853, Hutchinson Industries was founded by Hiram Hutchinson in Châlette-sur-Loing, France.

In 2020, Hutchinson Industries partnered with Mack Defense to build mobility components for the U.S. Army dump truck program.

In February 2026, the company acquired Cox and Company, an anti-icing expert.
