= YLC-2 Radar =

Chinese military radar

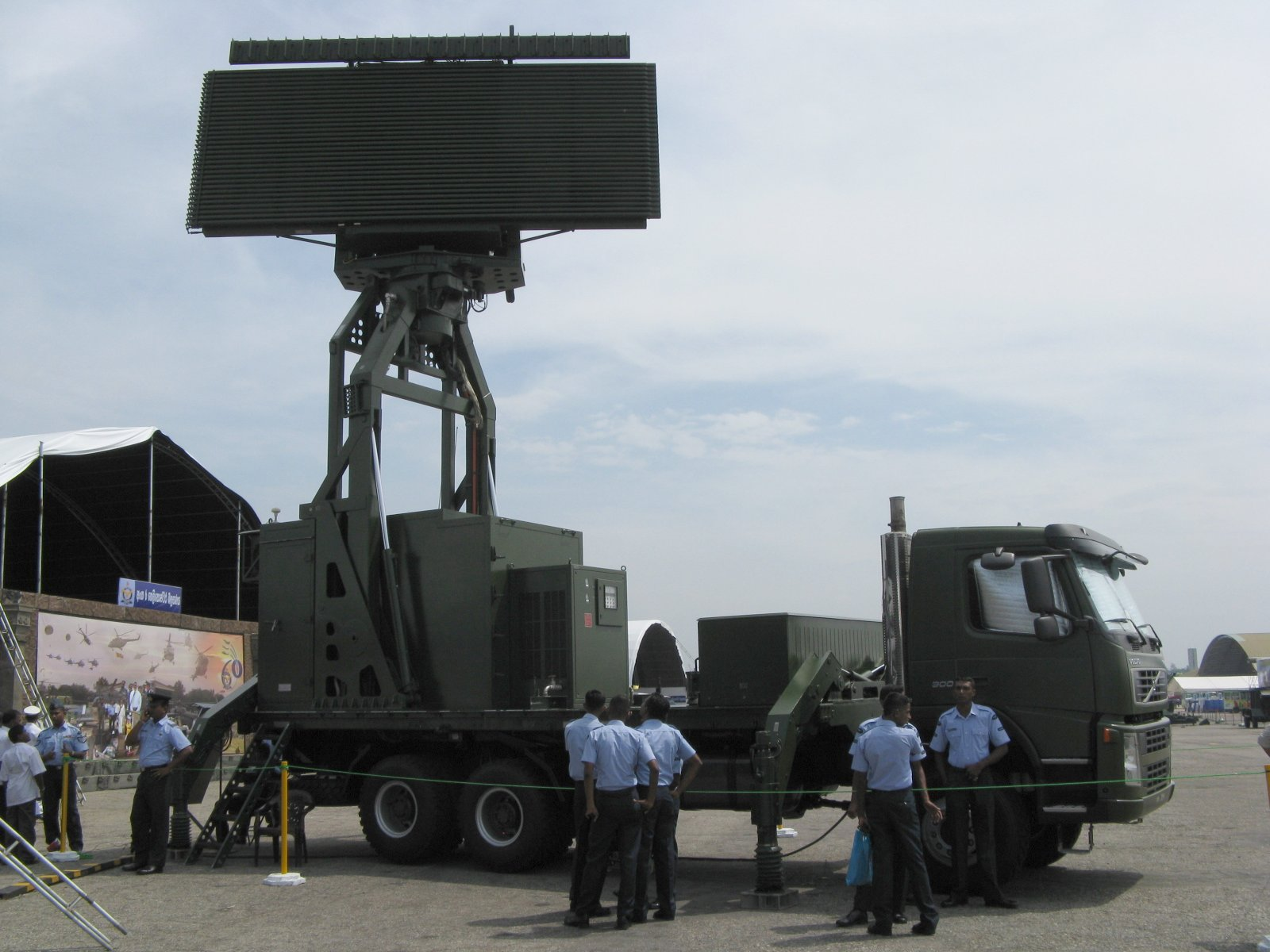
CETC YLC-18 3D Radar – Sri Lanka Air Force

The YLC-2 radar (domestic designation: LLQ303, formerly known as 385) is a three-dimensional main guidance and surveillance radar developed by the Nanjing Research Institute of Electronics Technology.

In the mid-2000s, an improved version labeled YLC-2A was deployed to the PLA. Equipped with a new Giga-flops digital signal processor, it is capable of Digital Moving Target Indication (DMTI) and Constant false alarm rate (CFAR) processing. An S-band variation called YLC-2U with similar capabilities was also developed for SAM guidance. Both of these advanced YLC-2 radars have been specifically designed to counter stealth fighters such as F-22, with a claimed range of up to 200km even in heavy ECM environment.

== Specifications ==
- L - band
- Power Output: 5.5 KW
- Peak Power: 85 KW
- Detection range: >500km
- Accuracy: range 200m
- Azimuth: 360^{0}
- Height: <500 m(R: <200km); 750 m(R: 300km)
- Resolution range: <100m
- Elevation 0.5^{0} - +20^{0}
- MTI improvement factor: 44dB
- Antenna aperture: 7m x 9m
- Antenna sidelobe level: -35dB
- Other features:
  - Phased array system and pencil beam scan technology
  - Wide band low sidelobe planar array antenna
  - Monopulse angle measurement
  - Frequency diversity
  - Distributed high power solid-state transmitter
  - Advanced programmable digital signal processing

== Operators ==
- China :Primary User
- Sri Lanka :YLC-18 radar
- Pakistan : YLC-18
- Myanmar :China sold unknown number of YLC-2V and YLC-18 radars to Myanmar in 2014.
- Algeria :YLC-2V
