= YLC-15 Radar =

Chinese air defence radar

YLC-15 is a fully coherent, Pulse Doppler air defence radar of Chinese origin. It is designed primarily to detect targets at ranges of up to 16 km. It also provides the capability to identify hovering helicopters or low altitude cruise missiles.

The YLC-15 radar features compact size, and light weight. Except for the antenna and pedestal, the radar can be broken down into three sections each no more than 30 kg, can be mounted on any vehicles, which enable it especially suitable for small arm missions in the battlefield. The YLC-15 also exhibits outstanding performance in power consumption and reliability. Its target detection and ECCM capabilities considerably extend its operation in a severe battlefield environment. The radar has been shown mounted on the BJ212/BJ2020 jeep and its equivalent.

The manufacturer of the system is Nanjing Research Institute of Electronics Technology (NRIET).

== Specifications ==
- Frequency range: S band
- Frequency bandwidth: 300 MHz
- Points of operation frequency: 15
- Max. Detection range: < 20 km RCS=2m^{2}, Pf=10-6, Pd=0.8
- Max. altitude: 6000 m
- Elevation: 0<60
- Azimuth: 360°
- For low attitude:
  - <16 km (at height of 100 m)
  - <7 km (at height of 50 m)
- Set-up time: 8 min
- Tear-down time: 6 min
- Operators: 1 or 2 (or unattended)
- MTBCF: 500hr MTTR: 0.5hr
- Other features:
  - High mobility
  - Fully coherent PD system
  - 3D target detection
  - One-dimension phased scanning array antenna
  - Full solid-state transmitter modules
  - Excellent ECCM capability
  - Display terminal with high performance
