= Ministry of Internal Affairs (Turkmenistan) =

Government ministry of Turkmenistan

Ministry of Internal Affairs of Turkmenistan
- Türkmenistanyň Içeri işler ministrligi
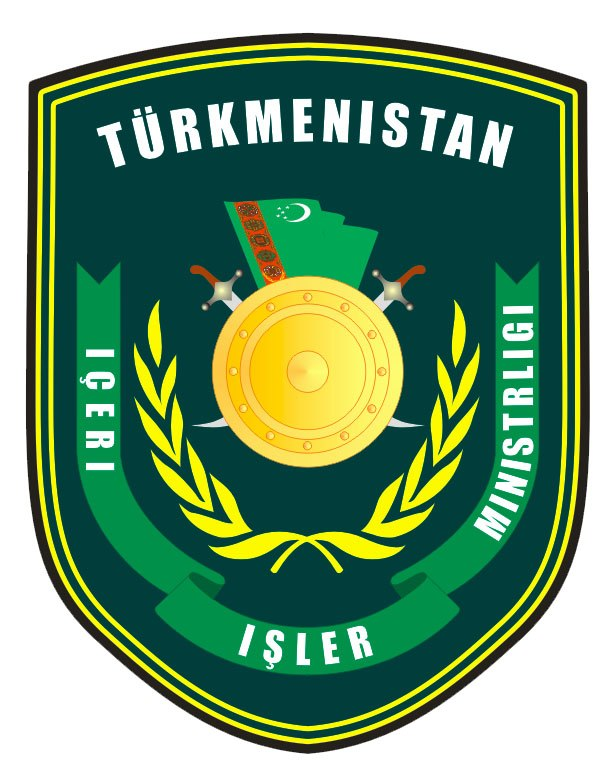
- Seal of the ministry

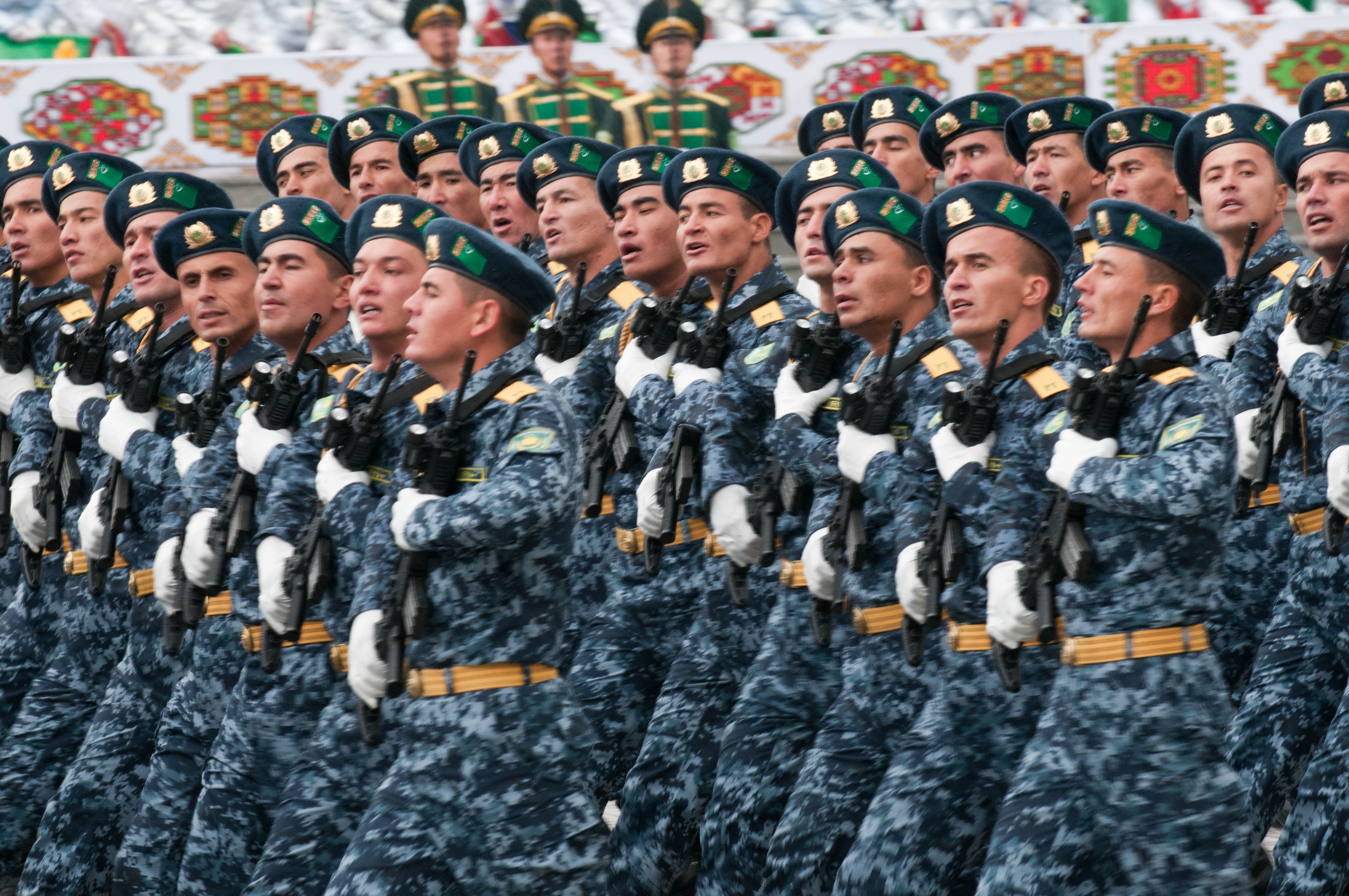
- Turkmen Internal Troops

Agency overview
- Formed: 1992
- Jurisdiction: President of Turkmenistan; Government of Turkmenistan
- Headquarters: 2033 Magtymguly Street, Ashgabat, Turkmenistan
- Employees: 25,000
- Minister responsible: Colonel of Police Muhammet Hydyrow
- Child agency: Turkmen Internal Troops

The Ministry of Internal Affairs (Turkmen: Türkmenistanyň Içeri Işler Ministrligi) is the interior ministry or national police force of Turkmenistan. The ministry directly controls the Turkmen police force, consisting of about 25,000 personnel and works with the Ministry for National Security on matters of law enforcement and national defense. The primary tasks of the police force include maintaining law and public security, crime prevention and investigation, passport control, road and fire safety, and international cooperation in law enforcement. The ministry works with INTERPOL. The current minister is Muhammet Hydyrow. The ministry was founded on February 19, 1998, by decree of President Saparmurat Niyazov “On the formation of the police of Turkmenistan”.

== History ==
In April 2007, President Gurbanguly Berdimuhamedow removed then-Minister of Internal Affairs Akmämed Rahmanow from his position on suspicions of bribery and corruption.

In 2012, the Ministry of Internal Affairs of Turkmenistan worked with the Organization for Security and Co-operation in Europe (OSCE) to train its police force on the issue of protecting human rights and countering terrorism.

In May 2016, the Bureau of International Narcotics and Law Enforcement Affairs conducted a course for officials of the Ministry of Internal Affairs on the topic of drug trafficking and related interventions.

In August 2017, the Agreement on Cooperation between the Ministry of Internal Affairs of the Republic of Azerbaijan and the Ministry of Internal Affairs of Turkmenistan was signed by the ministers of each country.

On 12 occasions, Turkmen president Gurbanguly Berdimuhamedow severely reprimanded then-Minister of Internal Affairs Isgender Mülikow, citing "poor execution of his job responsibilities, negligence in personnel issues". In 2019, Mülikow was fired, demoted, arrested, charged with multiple crimes, convicted, and sentenced to a 25-year prison sentence.

== Organization ==
- Organs of the Ministry of Internal Affairs (Turkmen Police)
  - Central apparatus
  - Territorial apparatus
  - Medical institutions
  - Köpetdag Stadium
  - Sports Club
- Turkmen Internal Troops
  - Various military units
- State Service for Protecting Security of the Healthy Society of Turkmenistan

== Educational Institutions ==
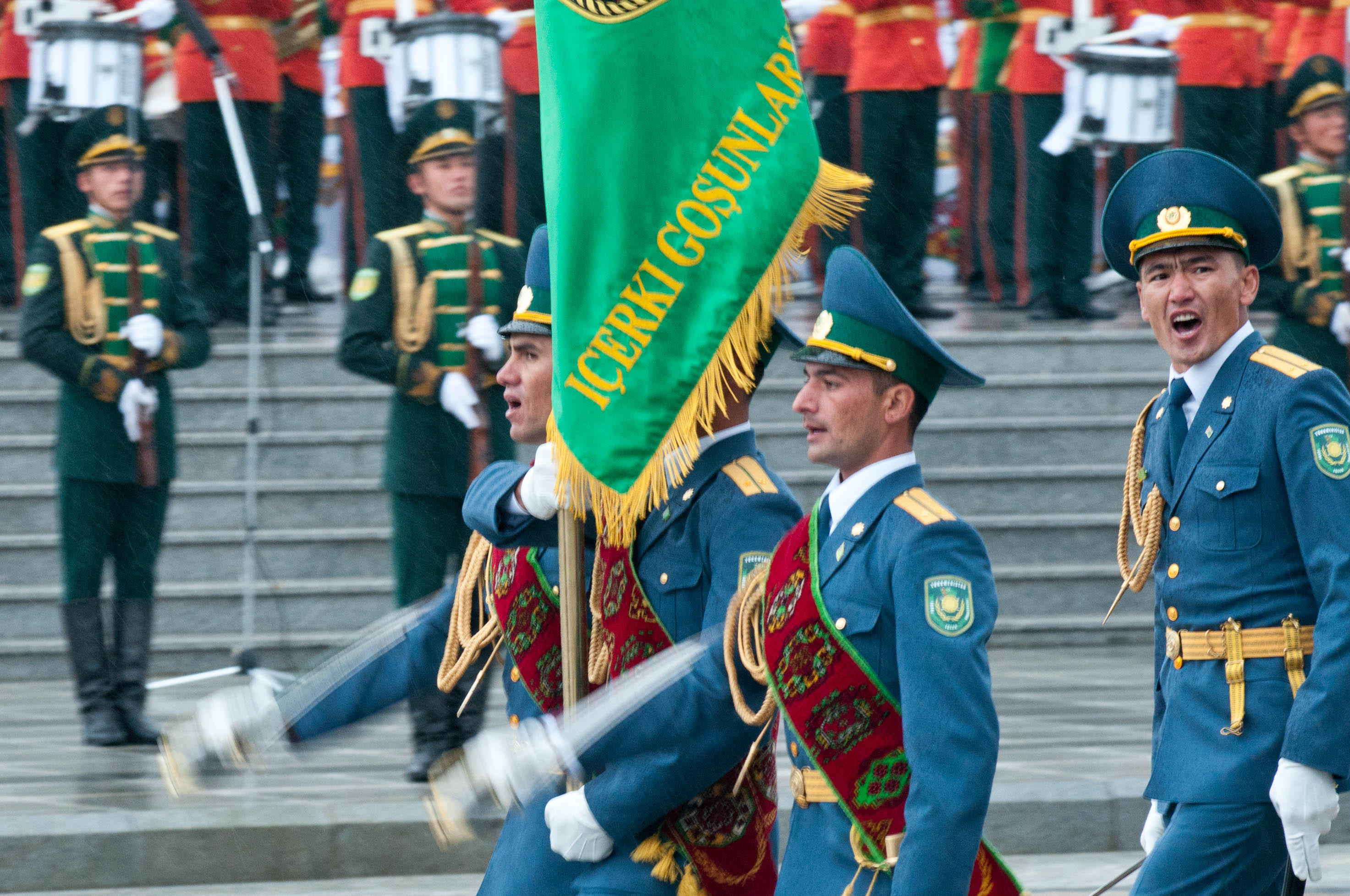
Turkmen interior ministry cadets.

- Institute of the Ministry of Internal Affairs of Turkmenistan
- Turkmen Police Academy

== Ministers ==
- Serdar Çaryýarow (17 May 1990 - 2 April 1993)
- Gurbanmuhammet Kasymow (2 April 1993 - 17 September 1998)
- Poran Berdiýew (17 September 1998 - 14 March 2002)
- Annaberdi Kakabaýew (14 March 2002 - 21 February 2003)
- Aşyr Ataýew (21 February 2003 - 12 August 2004)
- Geldimuhammed Aşyrmuhammedow (12 August 2004 - 9 December 2004)
- Akmämed Rahmanow (9 December 2004 - 9 April 2007)
- Hojamurat Annagurbanow (9 April 2007 - 8 October 2007)
- Orazgeldi Amanmuradow (8 October 2007 - 29 May 2009)
- Isgender Mülikow (29 May 2009 - 1 October 2019)
- Mämmethan Çakyýew (1 October 2019 – 1 July 2021)
- Öwezdurdy Hojanyýazow (1 July 2021 – 6 April 2022)
- Muhammet Hydyrow (6 April 2022 – present)
