= State Security Council of Turkmenistan =

Important decision-making body in the field of the defence of Turkmenistan

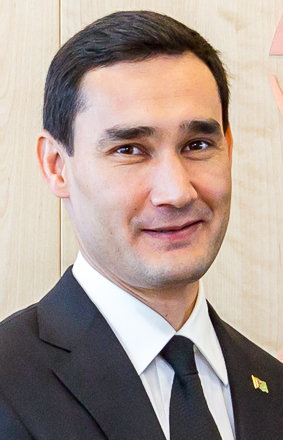
President Serdar Berdimuhamedow, the current chairman of the council and Supreme Commander-in-Chief of the military.

The State Security Council of Turkmenistan (Turkmen: Türkmenistanyň Döwlet Howpsuzlyk Geňeşi) is an important decision-making body in the field of the defence of Turkmenistan. It is the highest decision-making body in the armed forces next to the Ministry of Defense and the General Staff, with its members directly advising the President of Turkmenistan on matters of national security.

According to the 1995 Law on defence, the council is chaired by the President of Turkmenistan, who can define the powers and actions of the Security Council. The Security Council was first mentioned in the 2003 Constitution of Turkmenistan, with it noting that in the president's role as supreme commander-in-chief, he/she can convene sessions of the council, as well as dismiss and promote members of the council. It was originally led by President Saparmurat Niyazov until his death in 2006. During this time Major General Agageldi Mammetgeldiyev served as the council's secretary. Gurbanguly Berdimuhamedow succeeded Niyazov after the latter's death. The current secretary of the council is Begench Gundogdyev.

== Members ==
Members of the Turkmenistan State Security Council as of March 2026
Office	Incumbent	Since
Supreme Commander in Chief of Turkmenistan	General of the Army Serdar Berdimuhamedow*	2022
Secretary of the State Security Council	Lieutenant General Begench Gundogdyev*	2022
Minister of Defense	Lieutenant General Begench Gundogdyev*	2018
Minister of Internal Affairs	Major General Muhammet Hydyrov*	2022
Prosecutor General	Counselor of Justice 3rd Class Begmyrat Muhamedow	2024
Chairman, Supreme Court	Begenç Hojamgulyýew	2023
Minister of National Security	Major General Döwletgeldi Meredow*	2026
Chief of the State Border Service and Commander of the Border Troops	Colonel Ilaman Ilamanow	2026
Minister of Justice	State Counselor of Justice 3rd Class Merettagan Taganov*	2021
Chief of the Presidential Security Service	unknown	unknown
Chairman, State Customs Service	Major General Maksat Hudayberdiyev	2019
Chairman, State Migration Service	Colonel Amanmuhammet Sazakow	2023
* Denotes member of the Cabinet of Ministers.

== Secretaries of the Council ==
- Muhammet Nazarov (April 1997 - March 2002)
- Rejepbay Arazov (2 January 2003–24 October 2004)
- Army General Agageldi Mammetgeldiyev (24 October 2004–21 January 2009)
- Major General Yaylym Berdiyev (21 January 2009–22 January 2020)
- Colonel General of Police Çarymyrat Amanow (22 January 2020–6 April 2022)
- Lieutenant General Begench Gundogdyev (6 April 2022–present)

== See also ==
- Armed Forces of Turkmenistan
- Ministry of Defense (Turkmenistan)
- Ministry of Internal Affairs (Turkmenistan)
- Ministry of National Security (Turkmenistan)
- Chief of the General Staff (Turkmenistan)
- Turkmen National Guard
- Turkmen Ground Forces
- Turkmen Air Force
- Turkmen Navy
- Security Council (disambiguation)
