= Turkmen State Border Service Institute =

Turkmen military academies based in Ashgabat

- Türkmenistanyň Serhet Instituty
- Active: 2011 to present
- Country: Turkmenistan
- Branch: State Border Service of Turkmenistan
- Type: military academy
- Role: Border training
- Part of: Armed Forces of Turkmenistan
- Garrison/HQ: Ashgabat

Turkmen State Border Service Institute (Turkmen: Türkmenistanyň Serhet Instituty) is an educational institution that specializes in the training of personnel of the State Border Service of Turkmenistan and the Turkmen Border Troops. The institute is one of many Turkmen military academies based in Ashgabat.

== History ==
In August 2004, President Saparmurat Niyazov announced that personnel of the Ministry for National Security and the Border Service would be trained in the same compound, authorizing the KNB to conclude a $20 million contract with the Turkish firm GAP Insaat for the construction of an educational compound next to the Military Institute in Ashgabat. It was commissioned in February 2006. In January 2011, President Gurbanguly Berdimuhamedow signed documents on the establishment of the Border Institute. It was handed its new colors in October 2011. Since December 2014, it has been located in a building near the DSG headquarters. The best cadets represent the service at the annual Turkmen Independence Day Parade.

== Educational aspects ==
Cadets at the institute are also acquainted Turkmenistan's foreign/domestic policy and the national military doctrine. Signals and border post training are two courses that are taught at the institute. The institute trains cadets in the following specialties: management of border protection units, legal studies. The term of study at the institute is 5 years. During the study period, the students of the institute are in full state supply and are provided with food, military uniforms, scholarships and dormitories.

=== Requirements ===
Special requirements to the Military Institute include the following:

- Must be a male citizen under the age of 24 who have completed secondary military service and have volunteered for military service;
- Male citizens under the age of 25 who have graduated from the Special Military Schools of the Ministry of Defense of Turkmenistan;
- Male citizens under the age of 24 who have been released from military service and in reserve;
- Women under the age of 21 who have a secondary education and have volunteered for military service;

== Rectors ==
- Batyra Kakageldiev (2011 – 13 November 2013)
- Dovletmurat Annamuradov (13 November 2013 – 25 September 2014)
- Amanmyrat Hommatliev (25 September 2014 – Present)
