= Akmurad Kabulov =

Turkmen general and politician

Akmurad Nazarovich Kabulov
- Акмурад Назарович Кабулов

Head of the State Border Service of Turkmenistan
- In office 1992 – 23 March 1999
- President: Saparmurat Niyazov
- Preceded by: Position established
- Succeeded by: Unknown

Personal details
- Born: Akmyrat Nazarowiç Kabulow; 1942 (age 83–84) Bolshevik collective farm, Moscow Raion, Lebap Region, Turkmen SSR, Soviet Union
- Other political affiliations: Communist Party of the Soviet Union (before 1991)
- Spouse: Yes
- Children: 2 sons
- Awards: Medal "Edermenlik" (1993); Medal "For Love of the Fatherland" (1996); Order of Turkmenbashi (1998)

Military service
- Allegiance: Turkmenistan
- Branch/service: State Border Service of Turkmenistan
- Years of service: 1960s–1999
- Rank: Major General
- Commands: State Border Service of Turkmenistan; * Turkmen Border Troops

Major General Akmurad Nazarovich Kabulov (Turkmen: Akmyrat Nazarowiç Kabulow, Russian: Акмурад Назарович Кабулов) is a Turkmen general and politician.

== Biography ==
He was born in 1942 on the Bolshevik collective farm of the Moscow Raion of the Lebap Welayaty. In 1963 he graduated from the Turkmen Agricultural Institute, specializing in animal husbandry. From 1968 to 1970 he studied at the Higher School of the KGB (now the FSB Academy) in Moscow. He then worked as the head of the Chardzhou Department of the National Security Committee of Turkmenistan (known as the KNB, which is the successor organization to the Soviet KGB), and next as the First Deputy Chairman of the KNB. From 1992 to 1999, he served as Head of the State Border Service of Turkmenistan and concurrently as the Commander of the Turkmen Border Troops. He was the first head of this agency. At the same time, he became a member of the National Security Council of Turkmenistan. In 1995, he hosted a summit of the Council of Commanders of the CIS Border Forces in Ashgabat, signing an agreement on cooperation in the protection of external borders. On 23 March 1999, he was dismissed from office "for serious shortcomings and omissions in work, failure to take exhaustive measures to strengthen military personnel, and weakening of exactingness towards subordinates."

== Downfall ==
After the events of 11 September and the defeat of the Taliban in Afghanistan, President Saparmurat Niyazov began to remove witnesses to the drug trade, with a "purge" being carried out in the KNB that saw dozens of officers involved in drug trafficking on behalf of Niyazov receiving many years of prison sentences. Kabulov, who knew about all the crossings of the Turkmen border by drug couriers, was also detained. In December 2002, he was arrested on charges of complicity in the assassination attempt on President Saparmurat Niyazov in November 2002. He was sentenced to 8 years in prison. After serving his term of imprisonment and exile, he settled in Ashgabat. He is married with two sons.

== Awards ==
He is a recipient of the following awards:

- Medal "Edermenlik" (1993)
- Medal "For Love of the Fatherland" (1996)
- Order of Turkmenbashi (1998)

== See also ==
- Begench Beknazarov
- Boris Shikhmuradov
- Batyr Berdiýew
