= Turkmen military academies =

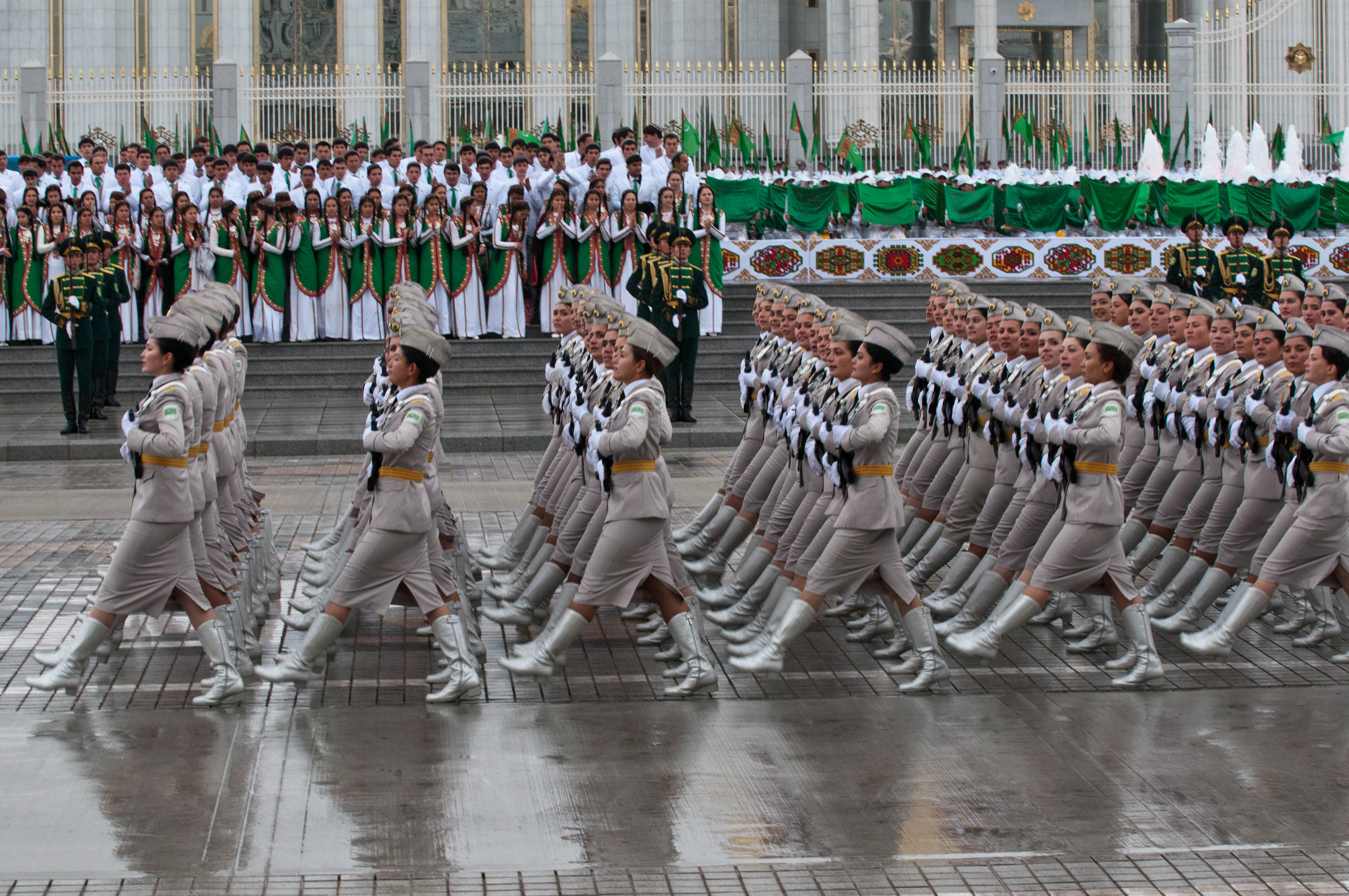
Female cadets of Turkmenistan.

Turkmenistan's security and armed forces currently fund and operate seven institutions of higher education:

- Great Saparmurat Turkmenbashy Military Institute (Turkmen: Türkmenistanyň Goranmak ministrliginiň Beýik Saparmyrat Türkmenbaşy adyndaky Harby instituty)
- Turkmenistan Internal Affairs Ministry Institute (Turkmen: Türkmenistanyň Içeri işler ministrliginiň instituty)
- Turkmenistan Military Academy (Turkmen: Türkmenistanyň Harby akademiýasy)
- Turkmenistan National Security Institute (Turkmen: Türkmenistanyň Milli howpsuzlyk instituty)
- Turkmenistan Naval Institute (Turkmen: Türkmenistanyň Goranmak ministrliginiň Harby-deňiz instituty), Turkmenbashy
- Turkmenistan Police Academy (Turkmen: Türkmenistanyň Prezidenti goşun generally S.A.Nyýazow adyndaky Türkmenistanyň polisiýa Akademiýasy)
- Turkmenistan State Border Service Institute (Turkmen: Türkmenistanyň Serhet instituty)

Aside from these institutions, Turkmenistan operates several vocational military schools around the country, specializing in the training of personnel of the various branches of service.

In the early 1990s when the armed forces were rapidly being developed, many officers were trained by the Russian Federation's Ministry of Defense, while at least 300 officers were sent to schools in Turkey. On 3 October 1992, Turkmen State University created the first Turkmen educational department.

== Ministry of Defense ==
=== Military Academy ===
The Oguzhan Military Academy of Turkmenistan was established on February 16, 2007, in Ashgabat. It is designed as a joint service institution, with enrollment coming from all branches of the armed forces. Construction began under President Saparmurat Niyazov, with the main facility being built by the French company Bouygues. The academy occupies a total of 14,000 square meters, with the Olympic Stadium being located to the right of the academy and an Olympic water complex standing to the academy's front. The building accommodates 1,100 cadets with fitness rooms, libraries, sports centers and modern classroom. The first graduation took place on 3 May 2013, at the Oguzhan Palace Complex.

=== Military Institute ===
The military institute specializes in job training for different military professions such as infantry, aviation and signals. The institute is housed inside the Ministry of Defense complex, which contains various activity sites that are open to cadets. The institute is divided into 3 secondary schools: the Berdimuhamed Annayev Specialized Military School in Ashgabat, the Alp Arslan Specialized Military School in Dashoguz and the Soltan Sanjar Specialized Military School in Mary. Until early 2007, the minister of defense served also as rector of the institute.

=== Turkmen Naval Institute ===
In June 2010, it was announced that the State Security Council of Turkmenistan led by President Gurbanguly Berdimuhamedow had ordered the creation of a naval institute. It was officially opened by Berdimuhamedow on Navy Day in 2015. The institute is based in Turkmenbashy. In September 2014, over 100 cadets of the naval institute attended a training course organized by the OSCE on maritime border security and port management.

== Ministry of Internal Affairs ==
=== Police Academy ===
The Police Academy of Turkmenistan named after Army General Niyazov was established on February 12, 1993, as the basis of the Ashgabat Special Secondary Police School, the Higher Police School of the Ministry of Internal Affairs. On February 19, 1998, it was renamed to honor then-President Saparmurat Niyazov. The academy conducts training in firefighting and law enforcement procedures. The academy has 5 faculties:

- Law
- Special institutions
- Fire-technical
- Internal Troops
- Advanced training

=== Institute of the Ministry of Internal Affairs ===
On May 29, 2009, the Special Secondary School of the Police of the Ministry of Internal Affairs of Turkmenistan was established. On July 1, 2011, it was renamed to the Institute of the Ministry of Internal Affairs of Turkmenistan. It is currently the most senior educational institution of the Turkmen interior ministry.

== Other agencies ==
=== State Border Service Institute ===
The State Border Service Institute was founded in 2014. The institute specializes in the training of personnel of the State Border Service of Turkmenistan and the Turkmen Border Troops.

=== Turkmen National Security Institute ===
The MNB Institute specializes in the training of personnel of the Ministry for National Security of Turkmenistan.

== Military education at civil institutions ==
The following is a list of universities in Turkmenistan providing military education in specific facilities:

- Turkmen State Medical University
- Turkmen State University (limited at first)
- Turkmen State Institute of Transport and Communications
- Turkmen State Institute of Architecture and Construction

These military departments were established in April 2007 for training civil defense reserve officers and nurses. Specifically officers are trained for service with motorized infantry, armor, engineers, chemical warfare specialists, and signals specialists. The military departments are designed as structural training subunits of civilian higher education establishments, graduates of which receive the rank of reserve lieutenant.
