= Berdimuhamedow =

Berdimuhamedow is a Turkmen surname. It is derived from the name Berdimuhamed, meaning "Muhamed-gave", and -ow, the Russian suffix for "son of" Notable people with the name include:

- Gurbanguly Berdimuhamedow (born 1957), Turkmen politician; President of Turkmenistan (2007–2022)
- Serdar Berdimuhamedow (born 1981), Turkmen politician; President of Turkmenistan (2022–present); son of Gurbanguly
