= Ýaýlym Berdiýew =

Turkmen military officer and politician (born 1972)

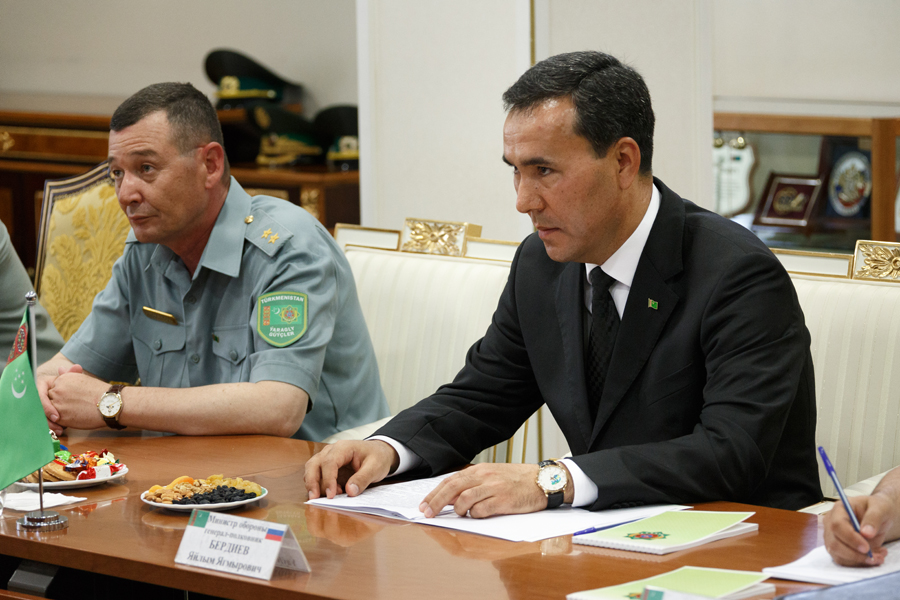
- Berdiýew in 2016

Minister of National Security
- In office 14 June 2018 – 12 February 2020
- President: Gurbanguly Berdimuhamedow
- Preceded by: Dovrangeldi Bayramov
- Succeeded by: Gurbanmyrat Annaev
- In office 29 March 2011 – 5 October 2015
- President: Gurbanguly Berdimuhamedow
- Preceded by: Çarymyrat Amanow
- Succeeded by: Guýçgeldi Hojaberdiýew

Secretary of the State Security Council of Turkmenistan
- In office 22 March 2011 – 22 January 2020
- President: Gurbanguly Berdimuhamedow
- Preceded by: Agageldy Mämmetgeldiýew
- Succeeded by: Çarymyrat Amanow

Minister of Defense of Turkmenistan
- In office 5 October 2015 – 14 June 2018
- President: Gurbanguly Berdimuhamedow
- Preceded by: Begenç Gündogdyýew
- Succeeded by: Begenç Gündogdyýew
- In office 21 January 2009 – 22 March 2011
- Preceded by: Agageldy Mämmetgeldiýew
- Succeeded by: Begenç Gündogdyýew

Personal details
- Born: Ýaýlym Ýagmyrowiç Berdiýew; 1972 (age 53–54) Baharly, Turkmen SSR, Soviet Union
- Party: Democratic Party of Turkmenistan
- Education: Turkmen Agricultural University Named after S.A. Nyýazow

Military service
- Allegiance: USSR; Turkmenistan
- Branch/service: Armed Forces of Turkmenistan
- Years of service: 1994–present
- Rank: Major general

Major General Ýaýlym Ýagmyrowiç Berdiýew (born 1972) is a Turkmen general and politician who has served as the minister of national security and as the secretary of the State Security Council of Turkmenistan. He previously also served as the minister of defense of Turkmenistan from 2015 to 2018.

== Biography ==
He was born in the Baharden District of the Turkmen SSR. In 1994, he graduated from the Turkmen Agricultural University Named after S.A. Nyýazow, majoring in mechanical engineering. After graduation and active military service, he began his career in 1995 as a mechanic in Serdar. In 2006, he became Chairman of the State Service for Registration of Foreign Citizens. The following year, he was appointed as the Head of the State Migration Service and later the State Customs Service of Turkmenistan. From 21 January 2009 to 29 March 2011, he served his first term as Minister of Defense. That same day, he was appointed Minister of National Security of Turkmenistan while retaining the post of Secretary of the State Security Council of Turkmenistan, simultaneously awarded the rank of Lieutenant General.

On 5 October 2015, he was relieved of his post as Minister of National Security and reappointed Minister of Defense. During the celebrations on the occasion of Navy Day on 9 October 2015, a decree was signed to confer on him the rank of colonel general. On 22 January 2020, a severe reprimand was announced "for improper performance of duties, work shortcomings", resulting in his demotion from colonel general to major general and relieved of the post of Secretary of the State Security Council. On 12 February 2020, he was relieved of his post in the MNB and was transferred to another job.

== Awards ==
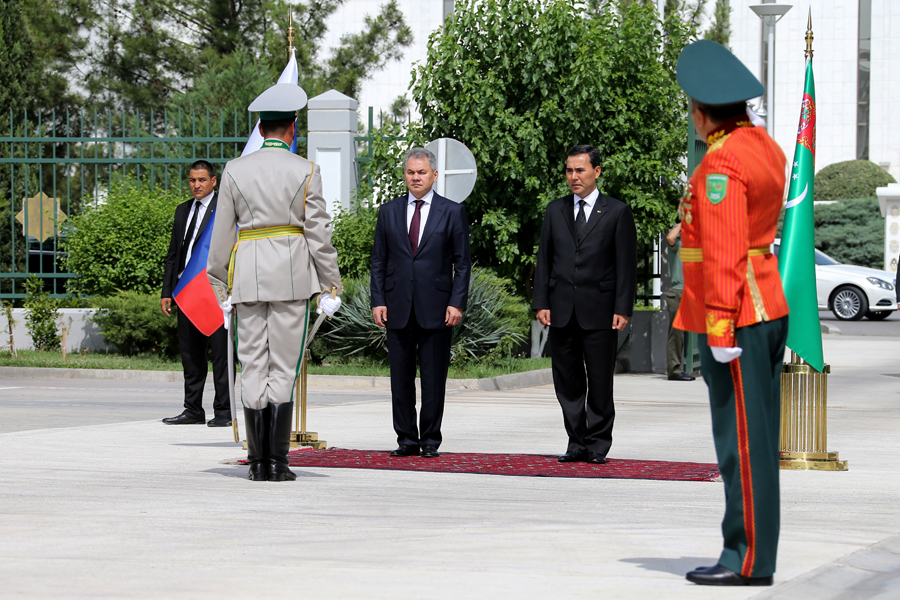
Berdiýew with the Russian defense minister, Sergei Shoigu

- Medal "Edermenlik" (2009)
- Medal "For Impeccable Service to the Fatherland" (2010)
- Medal "For the Love of the Fatherland" (2014)
- Jubilee Medal "19 Years of Independence of Turkmenistan" (2010)
- Jubilee Medal "20 Years of Independence of Turkmenistan" (2011)

== See also ==
- Government of Turkmenistan
- Ministry of Defense of Turkmenistan
