= State Border Service =

State Border Service may refer to:

- State Border Service of Azerbaijan
- State Border Service of Turkmenistan
- State Border Service of Ukraine
