= Çarymyrat Amanow =

Turkmen military officer (born 1966)

- Çarymyrat Kakalyýewiç Amanow
- Born: 1966 (age 59–60); Ahal Region, Turkmen SSR, USSR
- Military career
- Allegiance: Turkmenistan
- Branch: Ministry for National Security
- Service years: 1991–present
- Rank: Colonel General

Colonel General Çarymyrat Kakalyýewiç Amanow is a Turkmenistani general and politician who served until April 2022 in the position of deputy chairman of the Cabinet of Ministers responsible for security, military, and justice and secretary of the State Security Council of Turkmenistan.

== Biography ==
He was born in 1966 in Ahal Region. In 1990 he graduated from the Turkmen State University. A mathematician by trade, he became a teacher of mathematics at Secondary School No. 6 in Geoktepe the year of his graduation before enrolling in the Higher School of the KGB the following year. From 1992 to 2007 he served in various positions in the Committee and Ministry of National Security of Turkmenistan. Circa 2003, he became Deputy Chairman of the State Service of Turkmenistan for the Registration of Foreign Citizens and from early- to mid-2007 was in the same position again. From 15 May 2007 to 25 January 2008, he served as Head of the Presidential Security Service of the President of Turkmenistan.

From October 2007 to March 2011, he was Minister of National Security. On 29 March 2011, he was dismissed for shortcomings in his work, and was replaced by Yaylym Berdiyev. From April 2018 to 2020, he served in the post of rector of the Institute of the Ministry of Internal Affairs of Turkmenistan, holding the rank of major general of police. On 22 January 2020, he was awarded the special rank of lieutenant general of police. Eight days later, he was appointed by President Gurbanguly Berdimuhamedow to the post of Deputy Chairman of the Cabinet of Ministers responsible for Security, Military, and Justice (a de facto deputy prime minister) and concurrently Secretary of the State Security Council. He was reprimanded by the president in June 2021.

Amanow was promoted to colonel general (three stars) on 28 September 2021. The following week, on 4 October 2021, the president issued Amanow a "stern reprimand with final warning" for weak control of subordinates. His position as deputy chairman of the Cabinet of Ministers for security, military, and justice was abolished by presidential decree on 6 April 2022, and Amanow was transferred "to other work".
