= Agageldy Mämmetgeldiýew =

Turkmen military officer (born 1946)

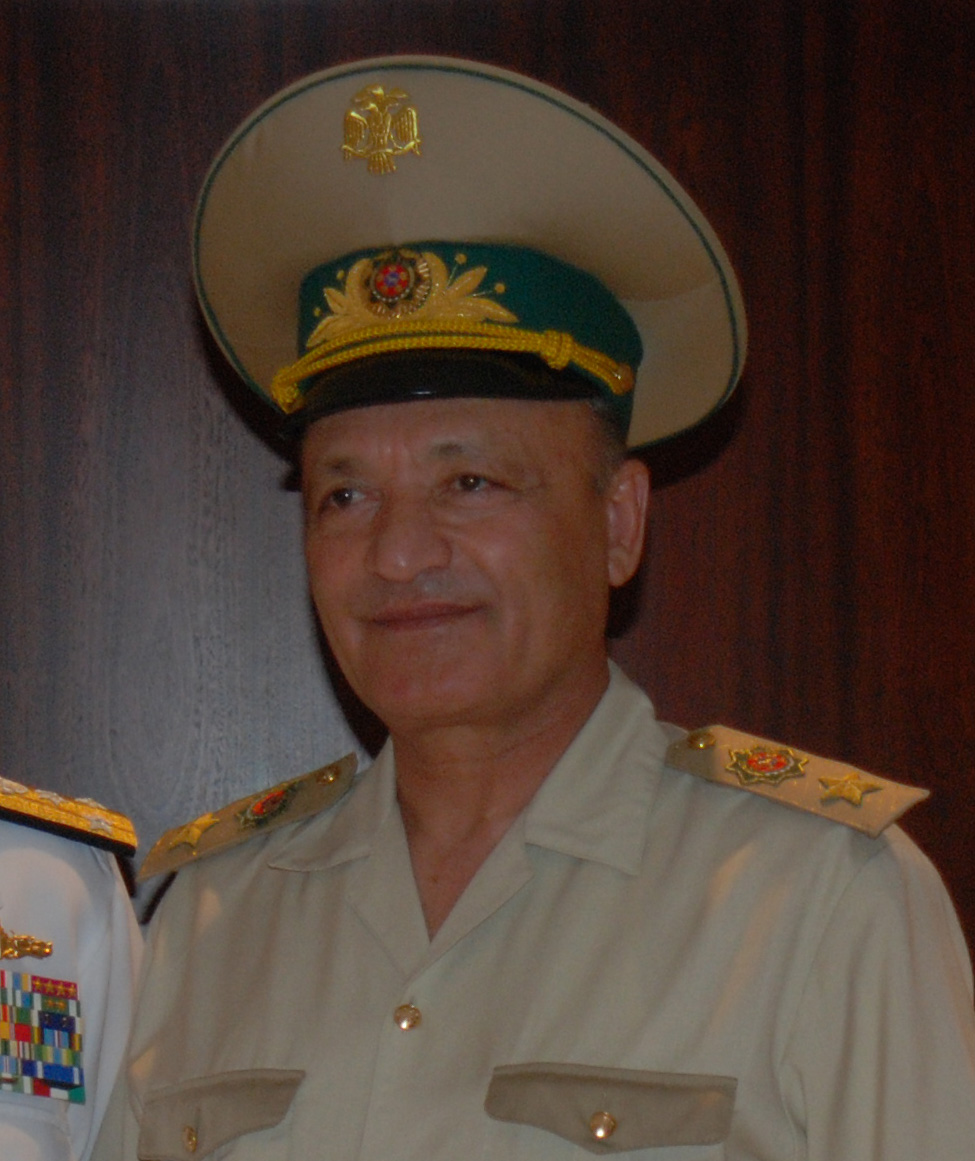
- Mämmetgeldiýew in 2008
- Born: Agageldy Mämmetgeldiýewiç Mämmetgeldiýew; 10 September 1946 (age 80); Ashgabat, Turkmen SSR, Soviet Union
- Education: Turkmen State Medical Institute
- Military career
- Allegiance: Soviet Union; Turkmenistan
- Branch: Soviet Army; Armed Forces of Turkmenistan
- Service years: 1970–2009
- Rank: Army general
- Nickname: "Grey Cardinal"
- Commands: Ministry of Defence

Army General Agageldy Mämmetgeldiýewiç Mämmetgeldiýew (10 September 1946) is a Turkmen military officer who served as the minister of defence of Turkmenistan from 2003 to 2009. He was also a Vice-Chairman of the Cabinet Ministers. At the time he served, he was the highest ranking military defence minister in the Commonwealth of Independent States. He is nicknamed the "Grey Cardinal".

== Biography ==
He was born on 10 September 1946 in Ashgabat. In 1963 he worked in a peasant farm. A year later, he studied at the Turkmen State Medical Institute. In 1968 he transferred to the Saratov Medical Institute, which he graduated in 1970.

=== Service in the USSR ===
He began serving in the Soviet Army in 1970. He served as a doctor, being the head of the first-aid post of a separate automobile battalion Turkestan Military District. Since 1974, he was the head of the medical unit of a military unit in the Group of Soviet Forces in Germany. He returned to the Turkmen Soviet Socialist Republic in 1979 and served in the district as the head of the military sanatorium in Archabil. From 1988, he was a teacher, and from 1990 a senior lecturer at the military department of the Turkmen State Medical Institute. By that time, he was a lieutenant general of the medical service.

=== Service in Turkmenistan ===
From 1992, he served in the Armed Forces of Turkmenistan, being first appointed head of the military sanatorium in the village of Firyuza in Ashgabat. He served at a country residence of the President Saparmyrat Nyýazow, who appreciated the care of the military doctor and ensured him a career.

In 1994, Mämmetgeldiýew was appointed Deputy Minister of Defense to Colonel General Dangatar Kopekov and the head of the Main Directorate of Logistics and Supply of the Armed Forces. In March 2002, he became the Head of the State Border Service, that same year, he was promoted to colonel general, bypassing the rank of lieutenant general and becoming Minister of Defense in September while simultaneously becoming rector of the Military Institute of Turkmenistan. The military rank of Army General was bestowed upon him on 24 October 2004. At the same time he was the secretary of the State Security Council of Turkmenistan.

In the last years of his life President Nyýazow relied on Mämmetgeldiýew closely for policy. Mämmetgeldiýew proposed the use of Turkmen soldiers for cotton cultivation to Nyýazow during a Defender of the Fatherland Day event in January 2005. In addition, he carried out the transfer of the army to self-sufficiency: abandoning the "meaningless drill in the barracks". He also expanded Turkmenistan's military relations, reaching out to countries like China and Azerbaijan. After the sudden death of Nyýazow in December 2006, many observers saw him as one of the main executors of the plot to arrange for succession of President Gurbanguly Berdimuhamedow. He retained the post of Minister of Defense and all other posts for two more years. In January 2009, he was removed from his post as Minister and was dismissed "due to his retirement due to health reasons", being replaced by Ýaýlym Berdiýew. Today, he resides in Ashgabat.

He was awarded Order of Türkmenbaşy on his 60th birthday in September 2006 and is also the recipient of other medals of the USSR and Turkmenistan.
