= Begench Beknazarov =

Officer in the Armed Forces of Turkmenistan

Begench Amandurdievich Beknazarov (Turkmen: Begenç Amandurdiýewiç Beknazarow; Russian: Бегенч Амандурдыевич Бекназаров) was a military officer in the Armed Forces of Turkmenistan, who was sentenced to life in 2005 for his alleged role in the assassination attempt on President of Turkmenistan Saparmurat Niyazov. He was sent into hiding following the November 2002 attack and remained in hiding until his 2005 capture. He is also the nephew of former Turkmen Foreign Minister and political prisoner Boris Şyhmyradow.

== Early life and career ==
Beknazarov was born in Ashgabat on 11 June 1969 in a blended Turkmen and Russian Jewish family of four, with his father working as a tractor drivers' foreman and his mother as a nurse. Begench has three children, two of which study at Russian universities. He graduated from in School No.41 in Ashgabat in the early 80s. Upon graduation, he went to the Frunze Higher Military Academy in Kyiv, where he in autumn 1986 took part in the response to the Chernobyl disaster. He graduated with distinction from the academy in 1990 and was stationed in Chuhuiv, where he got married. He later returned to Turkmenistan a year later, where he enlisted in the Turkmen Ground Forces with the rank of Lieutenant. In 1997 he completed a six-month course at a NATO school in Germany, after which he became the deputy commander of the 22nd Motor Rifle Division "Atamyrat Niyazov". In early October 2002 he was transferred to the command post in a military unit in Kyzyl-Arvat with a demotion to rank the rank of Major. He also reportedly served in the KNB.

== Disappearance ==
Beknazarov disappeared the morning after the assassination attempt on President Niyazov. On the 27th of November, the police began a search for him on the grounds of his alleged involvement in the attempt on Niyazov. Niyazov reprimanded Minister of Defense Rejepbay Arazov for allowing such people like Beknazarov saying that "every military unit commander would be carefully checked to the third degree, then there would not be any individuals such as Beknazarov.” On 17 December 2002, Beknazarov's parents, Raisa (born 1947) and Amandurdy (born 1939), as well as his 19-year-old sister were detained at the pre-trial detention center of the KNB building without formal charges in an attempt to obtain information about his whereabouts, threatening and intimidating them in the process. Raisa was later dismissed from her job, and his sister was expelled from university, after which both were exiled from Ashgabat to Mary Province.

== Capture ==
On 17 May 2005, the police found Begench in the basement of his parents' house. For hiding him, his father and sister were imprisoned, but were released after the intervention of the Israeli Foreign Ministry. Begench was on the other hand transferred to the Ovadan Depe prison, and was sentenced to life in prison the following month. His status is currently unknown.
