= Begenç Gündogdyýew =

Turkmen military official and politician (born 1976)

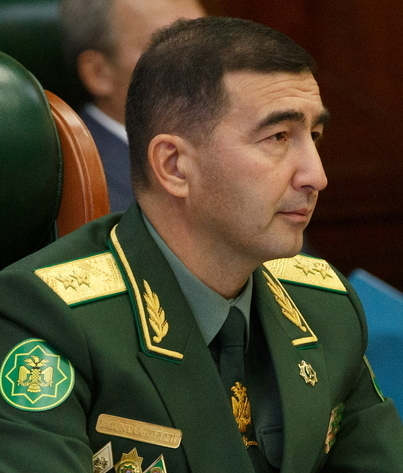
- Gündogdyýew in 2021

Minister of Defense of Turkmenistan
- Incumbent
- Assumed office 14 June 2018
- President: Serdar Berdimuhamedow; Gurbanguly Berdimuhamedow
- Preceded by: Ýaýlym Berdiýew
- In office 29 March 2011 – 5 October 2015
- President: Gurbanguly Berdimuhamedow
- Preceded by: Ýaýlym Berdiýew
- Succeeded by: Ýaýlym Berdiýew

Secretary of the State Security Council of Turkmenistan
- Incumbent
- Assumed office 6 April 2022
- President: Serdar Berdimuhamedow
- Preceded by: Çarymyrat Amanow

Head of the State Border Service of Turkmenistan
- In office 1 March 2016 – 14 June 2018
- Preceded by: Myrat Yslamov
- Succeeded by: Shadurdy Durdyyev

Personal details
- Born: Begenç Ataýewiç Gündogdyýew; 16 November 1976 (age 49) Ashgabat, Turkmen SSR, Soviet Union
- Party: Democratic Party of Turkmenistan

Military service
- Allegiance: Turkmenistan
- Branch/service: Armed Forces of Turkmenistan
- Years of service: 1993–present
- Rank: Lieutenant general

Lieutenant General Begenç Ataýewiç Gündogdyýew (born 16 November 1976) is a Turkmen military officer and politician who currently serves as the 10th minister of defence of Turkmenistan under President Serdar Berdimuhamedow. He previously served in this same position from 2011 to 2015, succeeding Ýaýlym Berdiýew.

== Biography ==
=== Early career ===
He was born in the city of Ashgabat in November 1976 to an ethnically Turkmen family. He joined the army in September 1993, attending the Military Institute of the Ministry of Defense and graduating in June 1997 with a degree in command and tactical artillery troops. In March 2012, he graduated from the academic faculty of advanced training for the high command at the institute. In June 2012 he graduated in absentia from the Military Academy of Belarus with a degree in state and military administration. From 1997 to 2009, he served in various positions in the Armed Forces of Turkmenistan. In July 2009, Gündogdyýew was made deputy Minister of Defense and concurrently the Head of the Main Department for Procurement and Logistics of Turkmenistan. Up until then, he was the Turkmen military attaché to the United States. Four months later, he was made Chief of the General Staff, a position he would keep for 1 year and 144 days before he became the Minister of Defense of Turkmenistan, at the rank of lieutenant colonel.

=== Defense Minister (1st time) ===
In July 2011, he was demoted to colonel for his handling of the 2011 arms depot explosion. One of his first major appearances in this role was in the Turkmen Independence Day Parade, where he inspected the troops on Independence Square. Gündogdyýew also oversaw military manoeuvres in the Caspian Sea in the second year of his tenure. On 11 March 2012, he visited Turkmen cadets at the Belarusian University of Civil Protection of the Ministry of Emergency Situations.

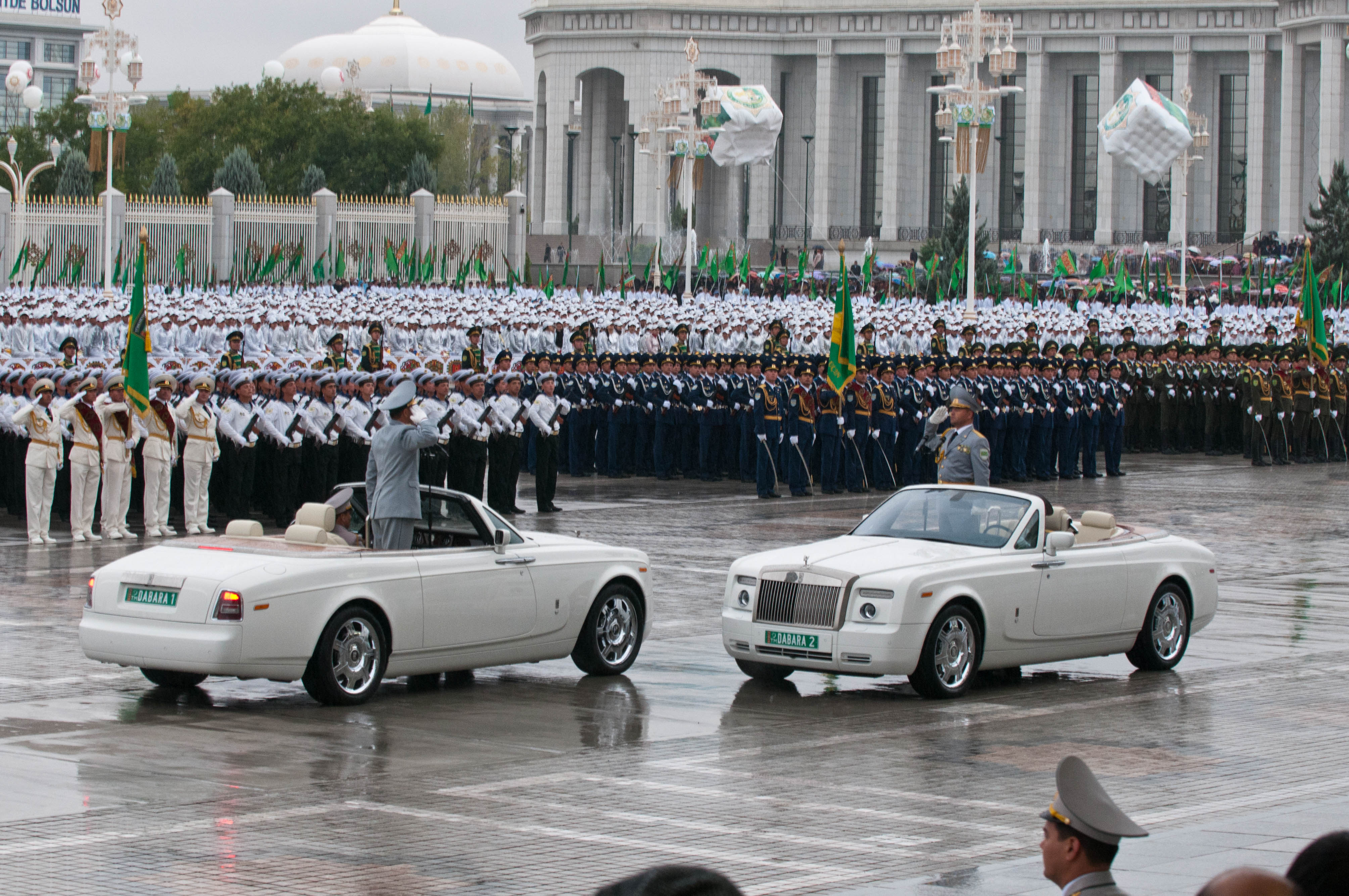
Gündogdyýew (right) receiving the report from a military officer in October 2011.

On 25 January 2013, President Gurbanguly Berdimuhamedow promoted him to major general (one-star). On 28 September 2021, the president promoted him to lieutenant general (two-star).

=== Other positions ===
He was dismissed as minister on 5 October 2015, being replaced by Ýaýlym Berdiýew, and appointed commander of the garrison of the Naval Forces, a position he would keep until the spring of 2016. On 1 March 2016, he was appointed chief of the State Border Service of Turkmenistan and concurrently the commander of the Turkmen Border Troops. On 15 August 2017, President Berdimuhamedow demoted Gündogdyýew to colonel following the latter's failure to handle incidents on the Turkmen border with Iran and Afghanistan in July 2017, when four ISIS militants tried to cross into the territory of Turkmenistan. Despite these incidents, he would be repromoted in March 2018 to major general.

=== Defense Minister (2nd time) ===
He was reappointed defence minister on 14 June 2018. On 22 January 2020, he received a "stern reprimand with final warning for improper performance of official duties". He was reprimanded among other things for allowing troops to write off still serviceable cars to private individuals (for example, several ZIL and Ural trucks were sold from a motor pool stationed in the city of Serdar). In June 2020, Gündogdyýew led the Turkmen delegation in place of the president at the 2020 Moscow Victory Day Parade on Red Square.

On 6 April 2022 Gündogdyýew was concurrently appointed secretary of the State Security Council of Turkmenistan.

== Private life ==
Besides the Turkmen language, he also speaks Russian and English. He is married with four children.

== Awards ==
=== Decorations ===
- Medal "For the Love of the Fatherland" (2014)
- Jubilee Medal "20 Years of Independence of Turkmenistan" (2011)
- Medal "Participant of the Military Parade Dedicated to the 20th Anniversary of Turkmenistan's Independence"
- Jubilee Medal "25 Years of Neutrality of Turkmenistan" (2020)

=== Honorary ranks ===
- Türkmenistanyň Watan goragçysy ('Defender of Homeland Turkmenistan')

== Reprimands ==
- 22 January 2020, stern reprimand with final warning for "improper performance of official duties"
- 5 June 2022, reprimand for "inadequate performance of assigned duties, deficiencies in the work"

== See also ==
- Government of Turkmenistan
- Ministry of Defense of Turkmenistan
- Armed Forces of Turkmenistan
- State Border Service of Turkmenistan
