= Serdar Berdimuhamedow =

President of Turkmenistan since 2022

His Excellency Serdar Berdimuhamedow
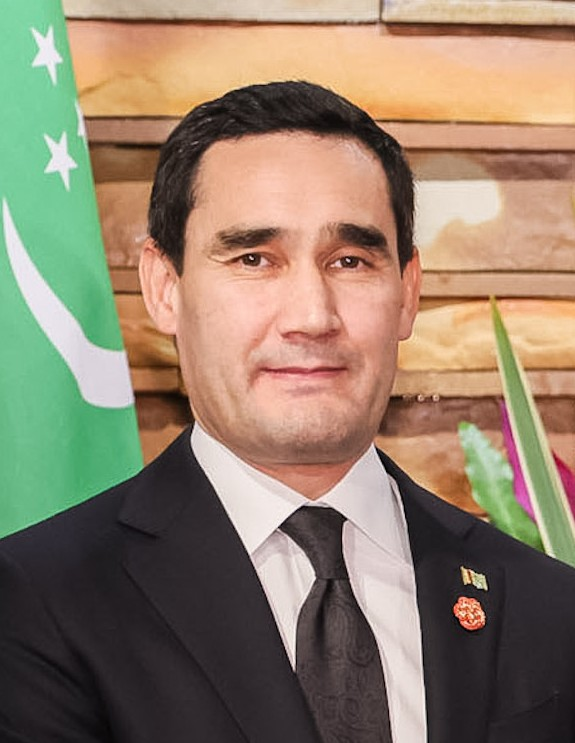
- Berdimuhamedow in 2025

3rd President of Turkmenistan
- Incumbent
- Assumed office 19 March 2022
- Vice President: Raşit Meredow
- Supreme Leader: Gurbanguly Berdimuhamedow (since 2023)
- Preceded by: Gurbanguly Berdimuhamedow

Governor of Ahal
- In office 17 June 2019 – 7 February 2020
- Preceded by: Tangahuly Atakhallyev
- Succeeded by: Ýazmuhammet Gurbanowa

Member of the Assembly of Turkmenistan
- In office 23 November 2016 – 2 January 2019
- Constituency: 25th district
Former government positions
Deputy Chairman of the Cabinet of Ministers for Economics and Finance
In office 9 July 2021 – 19 March 2022
President	Gurbanguly Berdimuhamedow
Preceded by	Position established
Deputy Chairman of the Cabinet of Ministers for Innovation and Digitisation
In office 11 February 2021 – 9 July 2021
Minister of Industry and Construction Materials
In office 7 February 2020 – 11 February 2021
Deputy Governor of Ahal
In office 2 January 2019 – 17 June 2019
Deputy Minister of Foreign Affairs
In office 2 April 2018 – 2 January 2019

Personal details
- Born: Serdar Gurbangulyýewiç Berdimuhamedow; 22 September 1981 (age 45) Ashgabat, Turkmen SSR, Soviet Union
- Party: TDP
- Spouse: Ogulgerek Berdimuhamedova
- Children: 4
- Parents: Gurbanguly Berdimuhamedow (father); Ogulgerek Berdimuhamedowa (mother)
- Education: Turkmen Agricultural University; Diplomatic Academy of the Russian Ministry of Foreign Affairs; Geneva Centre for Security Policy; Academy of Sciences

Military service
- Allegiance: Turkmenistan
- Branch/service: Turkmen Ground Forces
- Years of service: 2001–2003
- Rank: Army general

Serdar Gurbangulyýewiç Berdimuhamedow (Note: Turkmen: [θɛɾˈdɑɾ ɢʊɾbɑnʁʊˈlɯjɛβɪtʃ bɛɾdɯmʊxɑmɛˈdoβ]) (born 22 September 1981) is a Turkmen politician and businessman serving as the third and current president of Turkmenistan since 2022. Berdimuhamedow had previously served in several other positions within the government of his father, Gurbanguly Berdimuhamedow, the long-standing totalitarian ruler of Turkmenistan. The father and son entered into a power-sharing arrangement in 2023, through which they jointly rule a totalitarian dictatorship in Turkmenistan.

In 2021, he became one of several deputy chairmen in the Cabinet of Ministers of Turkmenistan. The next year, he won 73 percent of the vote in the 2022 presidential election, considered to be a sham election, succeeding his father's 18-year-long authoritarian tenure as president and making Turkmenistan the first modern country in Central Asia to be ruled by a dynastic system.

== Early career and education ==
Serdar Berdimuhamedow was born on 22 September 1981 in Ashgabat, Turkmen SSR. He studied at Secondary School No. 43 in Ashgabat from 1987 to 1997. Between 1997 and 2001, he studied at the Turkmen Agricultural University, graduating as an engineer-technologist.

From July to November 2001, he worked in the Directorate for Foreign Economic Relations of the Food Processing Association, followed by two years of mandatory military service. From 2003 to 2008, he worked again at the Food Processing Association in the fruit and vegetable department and in the non-alcoholic beer and wine department.

Between 2008 and 2011, Berdimuhamedow studied at the Diplomatic Academy of the Russian Ministry of Foreign Affairs, earning a diploma in international relations. During this period he was also assigned to the Turkmen Embassy in Moscow as counselor of embassy. From 2011 to 2013, he studied at the Geneva Centre for Security Policy, earning a post-graduate degree in European and international security affairs. He was concurrently assigned to the Turkmen Mission to the United Nations in Geneva as a counselor of embassy.

From August to December 2013, he served as head of the European Department of the Turkmen Ministry of Foreign Affairs. From 2013 to 2016 he was deputy director of the State Agency for Management and Use of Hydrocarbon Resources. From 2016 to 2017 he was chairman of the Department of International Information of the Turkmen Ministry of Foreign Affairs.

On 18 August 2014, he defended a dissertation at the Turkmen Academy of Sciences to earn the degree of candidate of science. In July 2015, he was awarded a doctorate in technical sciences.

He was often styled as "the son of the nation" by state media in Turkmenistan.

== Military service ==
Berdimuhamedow served two years of mandatory military service from 2001 to 2003. On 27 October 2017, he was promoted from the rank of major to lieutenant colonel. His promotion ceremony was broadcast on national television. His branch of service is unknown, but on 7 March 2021, he was shown on national television in uniform wearing the shoulder patch of the Armed Forces of Turkmenistan. The same video showed him wearing shoulder boards indicating the rank of colonel, and the decree awarding him the honorary title of "Defender of Homeland Turkmenistan" referred to him as a colonel. On 26 January 2023 the Mejlis of Turkmenistan adopted a resolution promoting Serdar Berdimuhamedov in his role as "supreme commander-in-chief of armed forces" to the rank of general of the army.

== Political career ==
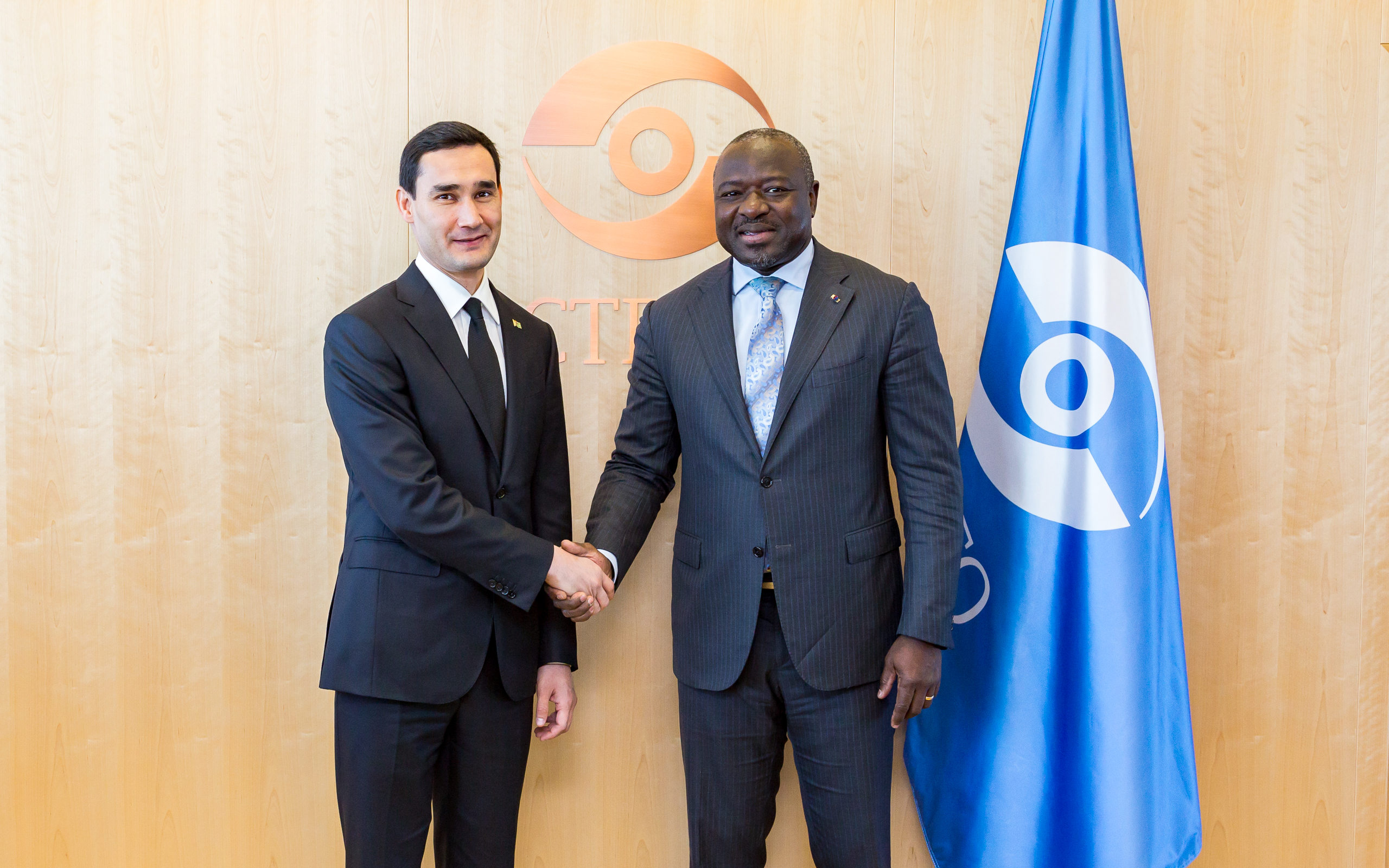
Serdar Berdimuhamedov paying a courtesy visit to the Executive Secretary of the Comprehensive Nuclear-Test-Ban Treaty Organization, Lassina Zerbo, 3 July 2018.

In November 2016, Berdimuhamedow won a seat in the Mejlis representing the 25th parliamentary district centered on Dushak, a town in Ahal Province. In March 2018, he was re-elected to the Assembly of Turkmenistan with over 90% of the votes cast in his district. He chaired the committee on legislation and norms as of March 2017.

Berdimuhamedow rose to the political spotlight following his appointment as deputy minister of foreign affairs in March 2018. In January 2019, Berdimuhamedow was shifted to the position of deputy governor of Ahal Province, the native region of most of the Turkmen elite. In June 2019, Berdimuhamedow was elevated to governor (häkim) of Ahal Province. In February 2020, Berdimuhamedow was appointed minister of industry and construction materials of Turkmenistan.

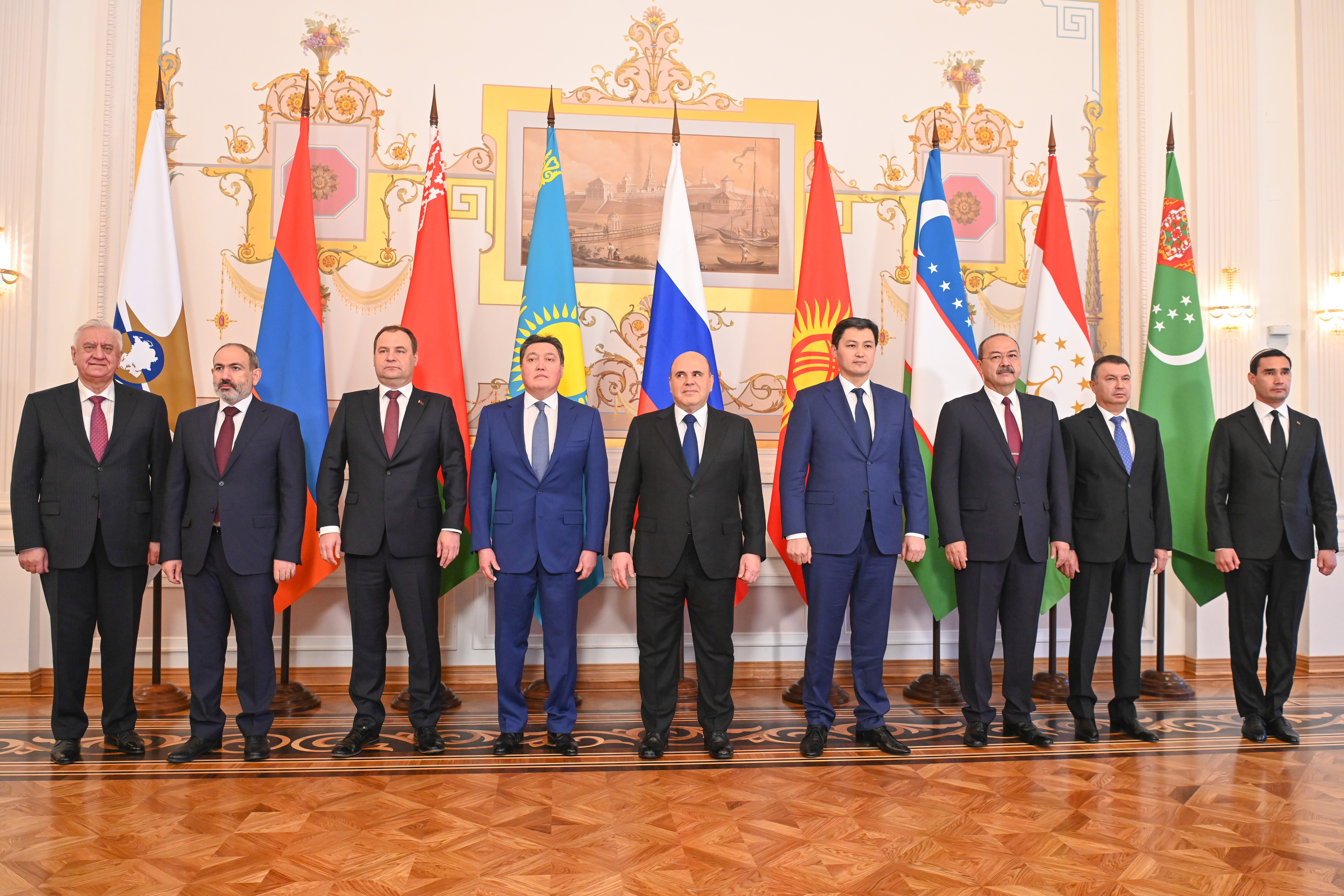
Berdimuhamedow (far right) at the 2021 Eurasian Intergovernmental Council meeting.

On 11 February 2021, Berdimuhamedow was promoted to deputy chairman of the Cabinet of Ministers for innovation and digitization, a new position. He was simultaneously appointed to the State Security Council and chairman of the Supreme Control Chamber of Turkmenistan. On 9 July 2021, Berdimuhamedow was relieved of his positions on the State Security Council and Supreme Control Chamber, and as deputy chairman was assigned the economics and finance portfolio with specific responsibility for "economic and banking issues and international financial organizations".

He is chairperson of the Turkmen Alabay Dog Association, and president of the International Ahal Teke Horse Breeding Association.

== Presidency (2022–present) ==
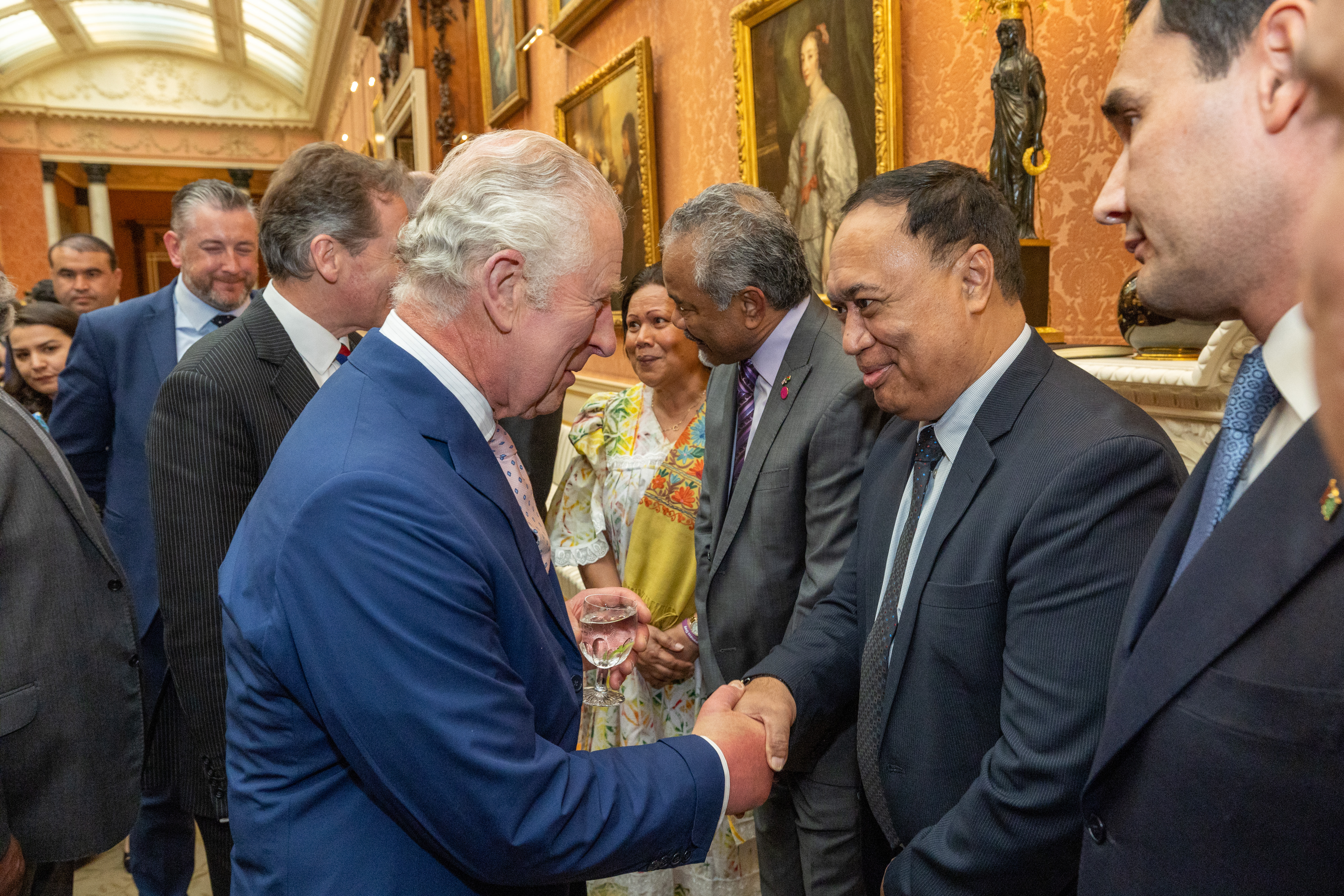
Berdimuhamedov at a reception at Buckingham Palace in London, 5 May 2023

=== Election ===
It was confirmed in February 2022 that Berdimuhamedow was running for an early presidential election on 12 March, fuelling speculation that he would be the successor to his father as President of Turkmenistan. He won the election with 72.97% of the vote, and became his father's successor as president, establishing a political dynasty. The election was seen by many international observers as neither free nor fair.

=== Inauguration ===
Berdimuhamedow was inaugurated on 19 March at the Ruhyýet Palace. He took the oath to the people on the Constitution of Turkmenistan and the Quran. He was then presented the presidential badge of office by Turkmen elders. From the palace, Berdimuhamedow, accompanied by a mounted escort, drove to Galkynysh Square and then to the Oguzhan Presidential Palace Complex where the Armed Forces of Turkmenistan performed a military parade. Deputy Prime Minister and Secretary of the State Security Council of Turkmenistan Çarymyrat Amanow reported to Berdimuhamedow. Later that day an official reception was given at the Audience Center of Turkmenistan. A festive Sadaqah was also given at the Hazret Omar Mosque.

=== Government policies ===
On 25 March, he presented his cabinet, basically confirming his father's ministers in their posts. The only new government member was Muhammetguly Muhammedow, who replaced him as Deputy Chairman of the Cabinet of Ministers for Economics and Finance. According to some, he intends to replace Foreign Minister Vice President of Turkmenistan Raşit Meredow with Esen Aydogdyev, rector of the International University of Humanities and Development.

=== Foreign policy ===
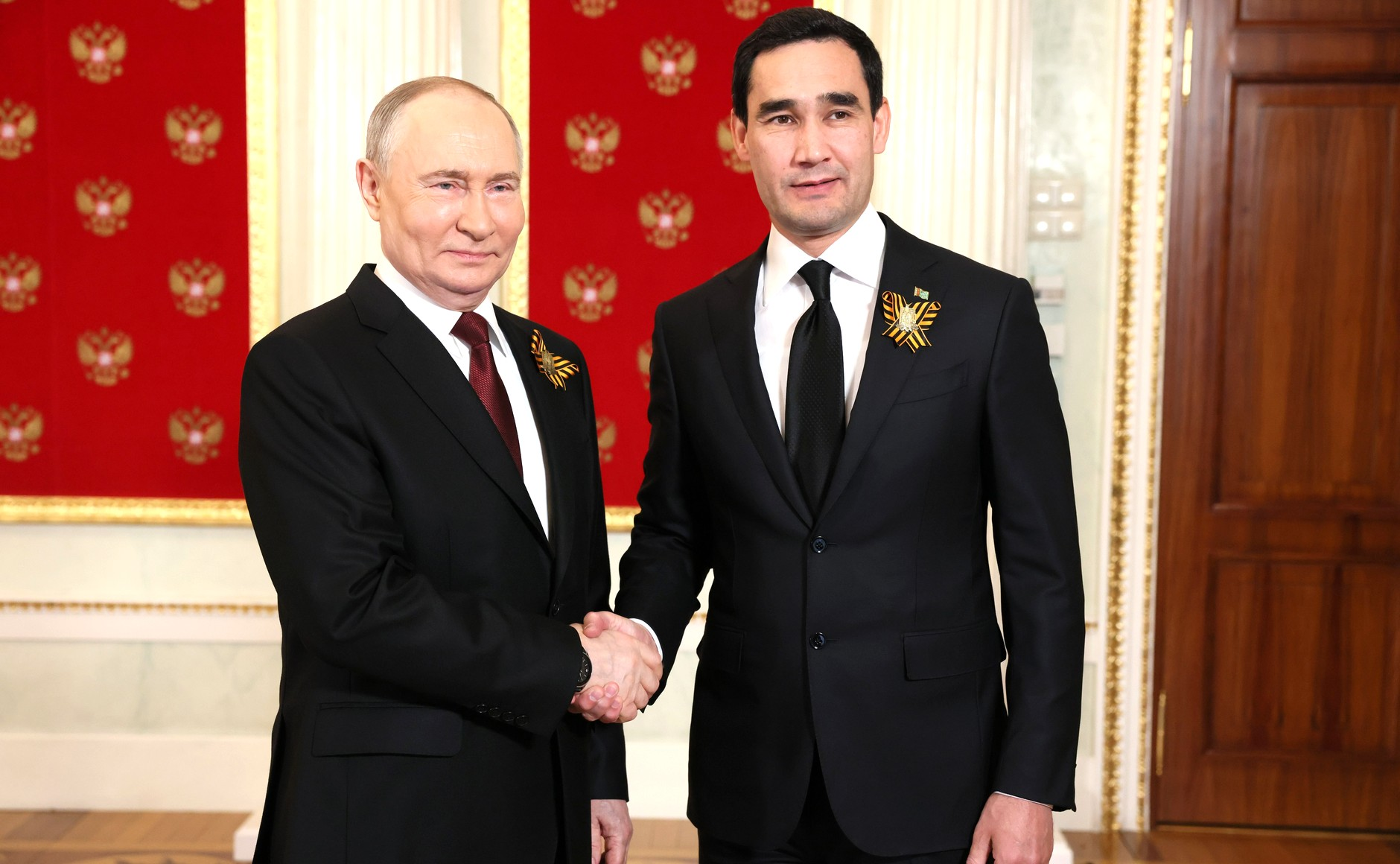
Berdimuhamedow with Russian President Vladimir Putin before the Moscow Victory Day Parade in Moscow, Russia, 9 May 2024

On the first day of his presidency, Berdimuhamedow accepted the credentials of Fazal Muhammad Sabir, making Turkmenistan the first country in Central Asia to accept the diplomats of the Taliban government of Afghanistan. Indian President Ram Nath Kovind made a state visit to Turkmenistan on 1–4 April, marking the first visit of the President of India to Turkmenistan, and the first foreign head of state to be received by Berdimuhamedow. The two leaders discussed expanding trade and energy cooperation. President Berdimuhamedow made his first foreign visit, to Saudi Arabia, on 1–2 June. Later that month, he made visits to Russia and Iran, on the visit to the latter he used the first Aurus Senat limousine purchased by the Turkmen government.

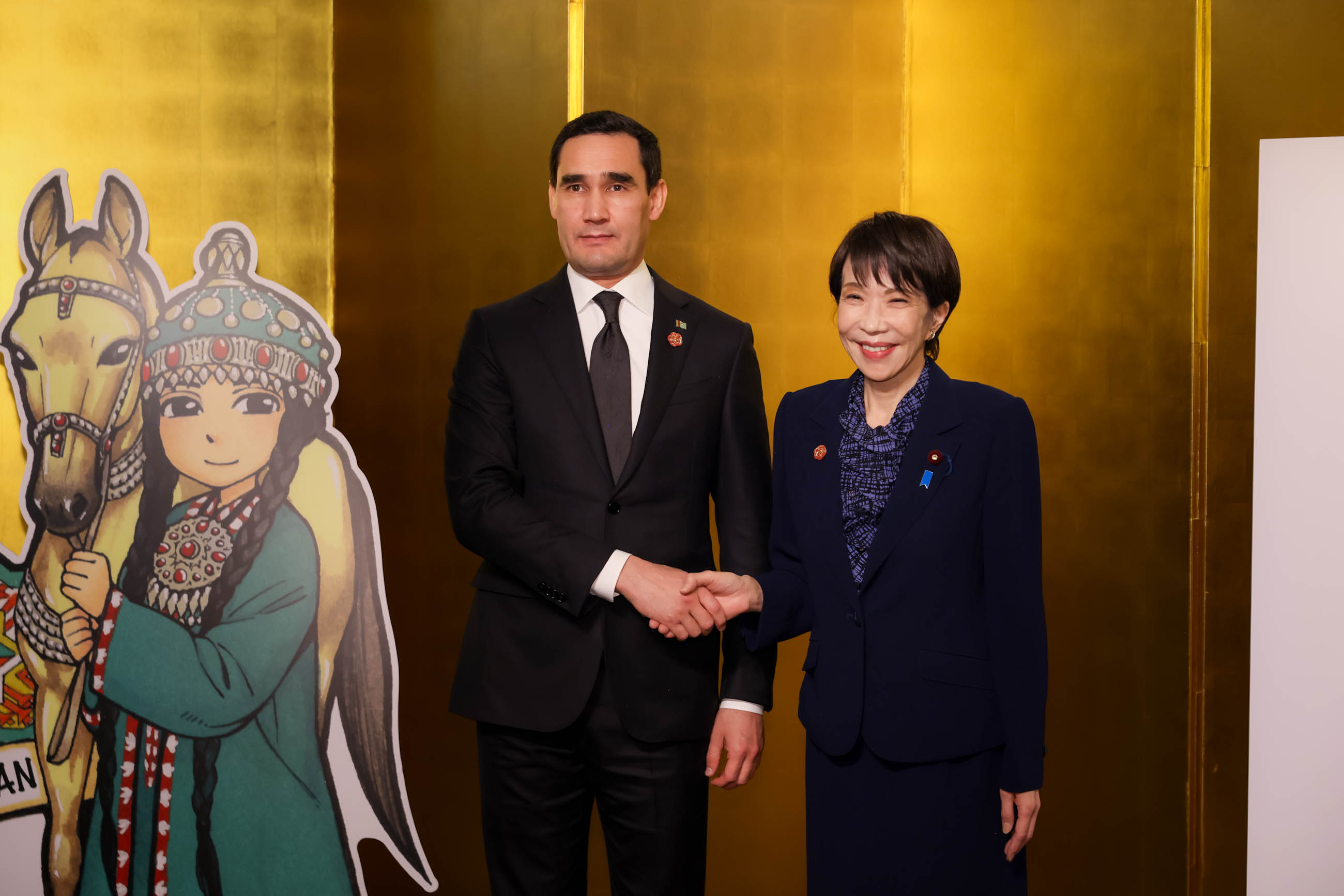
Berdimuhamedow with Japanese Prime Minister Sanae Takaichi at the Summit of the "Central Asia plus Japan" Dialogue (2025)

On 18 April 2025, Berdimuhamedow signed a law lifting some of the country's strict entry regulations for foreign visitors and allowing for the issuance of electronic visas.

=== National security policy ===
During a State Security Council meeting in early April, he also removed Colonel General Çarymyrat Amanow from the post of Secretary of the State Security Council of Turkmenistan in favor of the head of the Defense Ministry, Begench Gundogdyev, due to Amanow's "transfer to another job." He also abolished Amanow's concurrent office of Deputy Chairman of the Cabinet responsible for Security, Military, and Justice. He also replaced the Minister of Internal Affairs, Colonel Öwezdurdy Hojanyýazow, with Colonel Muhammet Hydyrow, due to "shortcomings" and "improper control over public order, traffic safety as well as activity of local representatives of the police."

== Awards ==
=== Decorations ===
- Jubilee medal "Türkmenistanyň Garaşsyzlygynyň 25 ýyllygyna" ("25 years of Turkmenistan's Independence")
- Jubilee medal "Türkmenistanyň Bitaraplygynyň 25 ýyllygyna" ("25 years of Turkmenistan's Neutrality")

=== Foreign awards ===
- Russia: Order of Friendship (2022)

=== Honorary titles ===
- "Türkmenistanyň Watan goragçysy" (2021) ("Defender of Homeland Turkmenistan")
- "Türkmenistanyň at gazanan itşynasy" (2021) ("Meritorious Dog Breeder of Turkmenistan")
- "Türkmenistanyň Gahrymany" (2023) ("Hero of Turkmenistan")

== Personal life ==
Berdimuhamedow is married and has four children. A classmate at the Russian Diplomatic Academy described him as even-tempered and unassuming. Instructors and other classmates reportedly described him as "modest, responsive, polite, and calm."

Berdimuhamedow speaks Turkmen, Russian and, unlike his predecessors, English.

On 30 May 2022, Berdimuhamedow's mother, Ogulgerek Berdimuhamedowa, was awarded the title of Honored Carpet Weaver of Turkmenistan for her many years at the carpet factory in the city of Gökdepe. On 1–2 June 2022, Berdimuhamedow undertook his first foreign visit to Saudi Arabia, where he and his son performed Umrah.

On 21 January 2023, Serdar Berdimuhamedov signed the constitutional law "On the National Leader of the Turkmen people", which provided his father Gurbanguly Berdimuhamedow and his family members with legal immunity and a number of other benefits. The Berdimuhamedow family makes extensive use of a fleet of five VIP-configured Boeing airplanes.

== Notes ==
Political offices
Preceded by Tangahuly Atahallyyev	Governor of Ahal; 2019–2020	Succeeded by Ýazmuhammet Gurbanowa
Preceded by Gurbanguly Berdimuhamedow	President of Turkmenistan; 2022–present	Incumbent
