= Cabinet of Ministers (Turkmenistan) =

Chief executive body in Turkmenistan

Cabinet of Ministers of Turkmenistan
- Türkmenistanyň Ministrler Kabineti

Overview
- Established: July 1991
- State: Turkmenistan
- Leader: President
- Appointed by: President
- Main organ: Council of Ministers
- Responsible to: President
- Headquarters: Ashgabat
- Website: turkmenistan.gov.tm

The Cabinet of Ministers of Turkmenistan (Turkmen: Türkmenistanyň Ministrler Kabineti) is the chief executive body in Turkmenistan. The Cabinet of Ministers of Turkmenistan is appointed by the President of Turkmenistan who is both the chief of state and head of government. In addition to holding specific portfolios in most cases, six deputy chairpersons (Turkmen: Ministrler Kabinetiniň Başlygynyň orunbasary, but colloquially also called wise-premýer) of the Cabinet of Ministers may also be assigned responsibility for oversight of a province of Turkmenistan or of the capital city.

The head of one state corporation ("state concern"), Türkmengaz, also holds ministerial rank, and is styled "minister of state" (Turkmen: döwlet ministri).

== Responsibilities ==
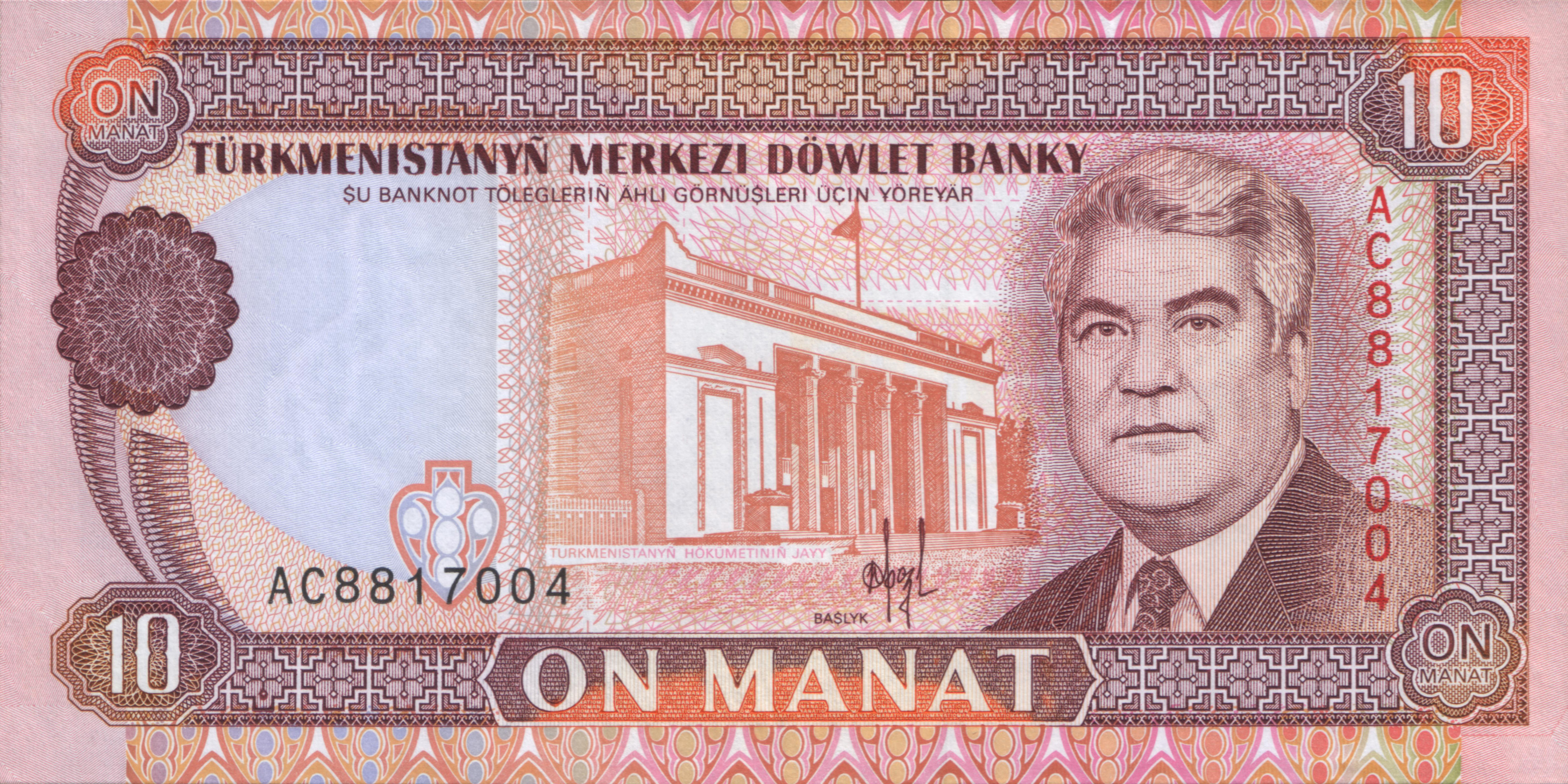
The building of the Cabinet of Ministers of Turkmenistan on a Turkmen banknote

The Cabinet of Ministers of Turkmenistan performs the following functions:

- Organizes the implementation of the laws of Turkmenistan, acts of the President of Turkmenistan, and the Mejlis of Turkmenistan;
- Implements measures to ensure and protect the rights and freedoms of citizens, protect property, public order, and national security;
- Develops and submits proposals for consideration by the Mejlis on the main areas of domestic and foreign policy, as well as programs for the country's economic and social development;
- Exercises state management of economic and social development; Organizes the management of state-owned enterprises, institutions, and organizations; ensures the rational use and protection of natural resources;
- Takes measures to strengthen the monetary and credit system;
- Forms, as necessary, committees, main directorates, and other departments under the Cabinet of Ministers;
- Conducts foreign economic activity and ensures the development of cultural and other ties with foreign countries;
- Manages the activities of government agencies, state-owned enterprises, and organizations; has the right to repeal legal acts of ministries and departments, as well as local executive authorities;
- Resolves other issues within its competence by the Constitution, laws and other regulatory legal acts of Turkmenistan.

== Current Members of the Cabinet of Ministers ==
Presidency - Office	Incumbent	Since
President – Chairman	Serdar Berdimuhamedow (Incumbent)	2022
First Deputy Chairman	Raşit Meredow	2007
Deputy Chairmen - Office	Incumbent	Since
Deputy Chairman responsible for Foreign Affairs	Raşit Öwezgeldiýewiç Meredow	2001
Deputy Chairman responsible for Agriculture and Dashoguz province	Taňryguly Atahallyýew	2023
Deputy Chairman responsible for Construction, Industry, Energy and Ashgabat city	Baýmyrat Annamämmedow	2023
Deputy Chairman responsible for Culture and Media	Bahar Seýidowa	2025
Deputy Chairman responsible for Economy and Finance	Hojamyrat Geldimyradow	2022
Deputy Chairman responsible for Education, Health, Science, Sports and Mary province	Batyr Mämmedow	2026
Deputy Chairman responsible for Oil and Gas and Lebap province	Guwanç Agajanow	2026
Deputy Chairman responsible for Trade, Textile Industry, and Entrepreneurship, and Ahal province	Nokerguly Atagulyýew	2024
Deputy Chairman responsible for Transport and Communication and Balkan province	Batyr Annaýew	2026
Ministers – Office	Incumbent	Since
Minister of Agriculture	Çaryýar Çetiýew	2024
Minister of Automobile Roads	Hangeldi Kerimow	2026
Minister of Communications	Hajymyrat Hudaýgulyýew	2025
Minister of Construction and Architecture	Abdulla Geldiýew	2024
Minister of Culture	Gurbanmyrat Myradalyýew	2026
Minister of Defense	Begench Gundogdyev	2018
Minister of Education	Jumamyrat Gurbangeldiýew	2024
Minister of Energy	Annageldi Saparow	2023
Minister of Environment	Öwezgeldi Goşjanow	2026
Minister of Finance and Economics	Mämmetguly Astanagulow	2025
Minister of Foreign Affairs	Raşit Meredow	2001
Minister of Health and Medical Industry	Myratberdi Gaýypow	2026
Minister of Industry and Construction Materials	Toýguly Nurow	2023
Minister of Internal Affairs	Muhammet Hydyrow	2022
Minister of Justice	Merettagan Taganow	2021
Minister of Labor and Social Protection	Muhammedseýit Silapow	2018
Minister of National Security	Döwletgeldi Meredow	2026
Minister of Railways	Mämmet Akmämmedow	2025
Minister of Roads	Begenç Annadurdyýew	2025
Minister of Textile Industry	Nurmuhammet Orazgeldiýew	2024
Minister of Trade and Foreign Economic Relations	Nazar Agahanow	2025
Minister of State (Chair of Türkmengaz)	Maksat Babaýew	2023

The position of deputy chairman for security, military, and justice issues was abolished 6 April 2022 by presidential decree. By decree of 8 July 2020, oversight of Balkan province was assigned to a non-member of the Cabinet of Ministers, then-General Director of the Transport and Communications Agency Mämmethan Çakyýew. Ministry of Sports and Youth Policy was downgraded to a state committee by presidential decree on 20 October 2022.
