= Committee for State Security of the Turkmen Soviet Socialist Republic =

Security agency of the Turkmen SSR

Committee for State Security of the Turkmen Soviet Socialist Republic (Russian: Комитет государственной безопасности Туркменской ССР), or KGB of Turkmen SSR, was the security agency of the Turkmen Soviet Socialist Republic, being the local branch of Committee for State Security of the USSR. It was succeeded in September 1991 by the Ministry for National Security.

== Chairmen ==
- Vasily Vaskin (6 April 1954 – 23 June 1956)
- Sergey Bannikov (3 August 1956 – 12 June 1959)
- Dmitry Pischulin (12 June 1959 – 18 January 1965)
- Leonid Korobov (18 January 1965 – 14 December 1973)
- Yakov Kiselev (14 December 1973 – 19 December 1978)
- Alexey Boyko (19 December 1978 – 21 May 1988)
- Petr Arkhipov (21 May 1988 – 25 March 1991)
- Dangatar Köpekow (25 March 1991 – September 1991)
