= Göytəpə, Agdam =

Göytəpə
- Location within Azerbaijan Location within Karabakh Economic Region
- Coordinates: 40°04′47″N 46°58′19″E
- Country: Azerbaijan
- Rayon: Agdam
- Time zone: UTC+4 (AZT)
  - Summer (DST): UTC+5 (AZT)

Göytəpə (Goytapa) is a village in the Agdam District of Azerbaijan.

== History ==
The village was occupied by Armenian forces during the First Nagorno-Karabakh war and was administered as part of Martakert Province of the self-proclaimed Republic of Artsakh by the name Գյոյթեփե. The village was returned to Azerbaijan on 20 November 2020 per the 2020 Nagorno-Karabakh ceasefire agreement.
