= Dangatar Köpekow =

Turkmen military officer (1933–2011)

Minister of Defense of Turkmenistan
- In office 7 January 1992 – 17 September 1998
- President: Saparmyrat Nyýazow
- Preceded by: Position established
- Succeeded by: Gurbanmuhammet Kasymow

Chairman of the Turkmen KGB
- In office 25 March 1991 – September 1991
- First Secretary: Saparmyrat Nyýazow
- Preceded by: Petr Arkhipov
- Succeeded by: Position abolished

Personal details
- Born: Dangatar Abdyeviç Köpekow; 12 May 1933 Ashgabat, Turkmen SSR, Soviet Union
- Died: 21 September 2011 (aged 78) Ashgabat, Turkmenistan
- Party: CPSU
- Other political affiliations: Communist Party of Turkmenistan

Military service
- Allegiance: USSR; Turkmenistan
- Years of service: 1959–1997
- Rank: General of the Army

Daňatar Abdyýewiç Köpekow (12 May 1933 – 21 September 2011) was a Turkmen general and the former minister of defense of Turkmenistan and the last chairman of the Turkmen KGB.

== Early life and career ==
=== Security career ===
Köpekow was born in Ashgabat in 1933. He worked as a junior operative and operative with the First Department of the KGB at the Council of Ministers of the Turkmen SSR. Then he was transferred to the First Main Directorate of the KGB of the Soviet Union (external intelligence). In 1968, he was sent to Iran to work as an assistant to the KGB resident in Mashhad. In 1971, he was deported back to the USSR. Twenty years later, in March 1991, he was appointed the chairman of the KGB of the Turkmen SSR.

=== Defence Minister ===
In January 1992, he was appointed the first minister of defense of independent Turkmenistan and soon he was also appointed rector of the Military Institute of the Ministry of Defence. In the early 1990s, Köpekow was awarded the military rank of Colonel-General, and later became a General of the Army of Turkmenistan. He had a great influence on the president of Turkmenistan, Saparmyrat Nyýazow.

On 12 September 1998, a terrorist attack was committed in Ashgabat, which resulted in the death of seven people. On 17 September, Köpekow was removed from his post, stripped of his rank, and appointed head of the Department of Law Enforcement and Military Agencies of the Cabinet of Ministers of Turkmenistan.

=== Later life ===
He was awarded the Order of the Red Star, as well as the Edermenlik Order in 1993, and the Order "For Love of the Fatherland" in 1996. He was also made an Honorary Elder of the People in 1995. He died on 21 September 2011, in a military hospital. He had lived in retirement in Ashgabat since 1999.

== Ranks ==
- Major (1971)
- Lieutenant-colonel (1974)
- Colonel
- Major-general (1990)
- Lieutenant-general (1992)
- Colonel-general (1993)
- General of the Army

== See also ==
- Government of Turkmenistan
- Ministry of Defense of Turkmenistan
