= State Customs Service of Turkmenistan =

State Customs Services of Turkmenistan Türkmenistanyň Döwlet gümrük gullugy
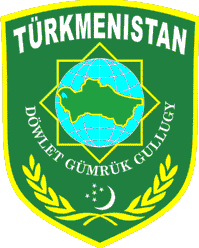
- Emblem of the Customs service

Agency overview
- Formed: 4 November 1991

Jurisdictional structure
- Operations jurisdiction: Turkmenistan
- Specialist jurisdiction: Customs, excise, gambling

Operational structure
- Headquarters: 138 Archabil Avenue, Ashgabat
- Agency executive: Colonel Maksat Khudaikulyev, Chairman of State Customs Services

Website
- www.customs.gov.tm

The State Customs Service of Turkmenistan (Turkmen: Türkmenistanyň Döwlet gümrük gullugy) — is a governmental agency of management performing the state policy in the field of regulation of activities of customs system of Turkmenistan, providing observance of the international obligations of Turkmenistan on customs questions, and also performing fight against smuggling and other crimes, administrative offenses in the sphere of its activities.

It was founded by decree on 4 November 1991.

== Structure ==
- Central Office
- Altyn Asyr Customs Training Center
- Directorate of Economic Management
- Customs Units
  - 6 customs administrations
  - 51 customs posts

=== Altyn Asyr Customs Training Center ===
The Altyn Asyr Customs Training Center in Ashgabat provides advanced training for customs service employees. The center provides English language training for customs officials.

== Chairmen ==
- Mammadklych Kabaev (29 July 1992-2 April 1993)
- Khabibulla Durdyev (25 June 1993-6 December 1998)
- Mered Khalovezov (6 December 1998-26 February 2001)
- Oraz Veliatayev (28 February 2001-29 July 2002)
- Alexander Grishin (29 July 2002-25 January 2006)
- Muradberdy Annalyev (25 January 2006-19 June 2008)
- Yaylym Berdiyev (19 June 2008-21 January 2009)
- Orazgeldy Esenov (21 January 2009-22 January 2009)
- Meredgeldy Berdyev (22 January 2009-2 August 2011)
- Annamuhammed Khojamkuliev (2 August 2011-4 August 2015)
- Dovrangeldy Bayramov (8 August 2015-1 March 2016)
- Mammetkhan Chakyev (1 March 2016-1 June 2017)
- Yazdurdy Soyegov (1 June 2017-25 October 2017)
- Atadurdy Osmanov (25 October 2017-8 July 2019)
- Maksat Khudaikulyev (since 8 July 2019)

== Links ==
- Türkmenistanyň Döwlet gümrük gullugy
- Таможенный союз - ГТС Туркменистана
