= Military ranks of Turkmenistan =

The Military ranks of Turkmenistan are the military insignia used by the Armed Forces of Turkmenistan. Being a former Soviet state, Turkmenistan shares a rank structure similar to that of Russia.

== Commissioned officer ranks ==
The rank insignia of commissioned officers.

| Rank group | General / flag officers | | | | Senior officers | | | Junior officers |
|---|---|---|---|---|---|---|---|---|---|---|---|
| Turkmen Ground Forces |
| Turkmen Ground Forces | Goşun generaly | General-polkownik | General-leýtenant | General-maýor | Polkownik | Podpolkownik | Maýor | Kapitan | Uly leýtenant | Leýtenant | Kiçi leýtenant |
| Turkmen Naval Forces |
| Turkmen Naval Forces | Flot admiraly | Admiral | Wise-admiral | Kontr-admiral | 1-nji derejeli kapitan | 2-nji derejeli kapitan | 3-nji derejeli kapitan | Kapitan-leýtenant | Uly leýtenant | Leýtenant | Kiçi leýtenant |
| Turkmen Air Force |
| Turkmen Air Force | | General-polkownik | General-leýtenant | General-maýor | Polkownik | Podpolkownik | Maýor | Kapitan | Uly leýtenant | Leýtenant | Kiçi leýtenant |
| Rank group | General / flag officers | | | | Senior officers | | | Junior officers |

== Other ranks ==
The rank insignia of non-commissioned officers and enlisted personnel.

| Rank group | Senior NCOs | | | | Junior NCOs | Enlisted |
|---|---|---|---|---|---|---|
| Turkmen Ground Forces |
| Turkmen Ground Forces | Starşina | Uly seržant | Seržant | Kiçi seržant | | Hatarçy |
| Turkmen Naval Forces |
| Turkmen Naval Forces | Baş gämi starşinasy | Baş starşina | Birinji basgançakly starşina | Ikinji basgançakly starşina | | Matros |
| Turkmen Air Force |
| Turkmen Air Force | Starşina | Uly seržant | Seržant | Kiçi seržant | | Hatarçy |
| Rank group | Senior NCOs | | | | Junior NCOs | Enlisted |
