= Ministry of Defense (Turkmenistan) =

Government ministry of Turkmenistan

Ministry of Defence of Turkmenistan
- Türkmenistanyň Goranmak ministrligi
- Roundel of Turkmenistan

- Turkmen Defense Ministry

Agency overview
- Formed: 27 January 1992
- Jurisdiction: President of Turkmenistan; Government of Turkmenistan
- Headquarters: 4 Galkynysh Street, Ashgabat, Turkmenistan
- Minister responsible: Lieutenant General Begenç Gündogdyýew
- Agency executive: Colonel Akmurad Anamedov, Chief of the General Staff
- Website: www.milligosun.gov.tm

The Ministry of Defense of Turkmenistan (Turkmen: Türkmenistanyň Goranmak ministrligi) is a government agency under the Armed Forces of Turkmenistan which is the executive body in implementing defence policies in Turkmenistan. The current Minister of Defense is Lieutenant General Begenç Gündogdyýew. It was founded in January 1992 with the assistance of the Russian Armed Forces.

At its formation, most of the ethnic Turkmen employees were retired Soviet officials and members of the Communist Party of the Turkmen SSR, with other officials coming from small backgrounds such as chief of staff Annamurat Soltanov who had served in Afghanistan and Begdzhan Niyazov who had a career in law enforcement prior to his rising to his position.

== List of ministers of defense ==
No.	Portrait	Minister of Defence	Took office	Left office	Time in office	Party	Ref.
1	Dangatar Köpekow	General of the Army; Dangatar Köpekow (1933–2011)	10 January 1992	17 September 1998	6 years, 250 days	Nonpartisan	–
2	Gurbanmuhammet Kasymow	Gurbanmuhammet Kasymow (1954–2021)	17 September 1998	24 May 1999	249 days	Nonpartisan	–
3	Batyr Sarjayev	Batyr Sarjayev (born 1945)	24 May 1999	26 June 2001	2 years, 33 days	Nonpartisan	–
4	Gurbandurdy Begenchov [ru]	Major General; Gurbandurdy Begenchov (born 1956)	26 June 2001	14 March 2002	261 days	Nonpartisan	–
5	Rejepbaý Arazow	Rejepbaý Arazow (born 1947)	14 March 2002	19 September 2003	1 year, 189 days	Nonpartisan	–
6	Agageldy Mämmetgeldiýew	General of the Army; Agageldy Mämmetgeldiýew (born 1946)	19 September 2003	24 January 2009	5 years, 127 days	Nonpartisan	
7	Ýaýlym Berdiýew	Colonel General; Ýaýlym Berdiýew (born 1972)	24 January 2009	29 March 2011	2 years, 64 days	TDP	
8	Begenç Gündogdyýew	Major General; Begenç Gündogdyýew (born 1976)	29 March 2011	5 October 2015	4 years, 190 days	TDP	
7	Ýaýlym Berdiýew	Colonel General; Ýaýlym Berdiýew (born 1972)	5 October 2015	14 June 2018	2 years, 252 days	TDP	–
8	Begenç Gündogdyýew	Lieutenant General; Begenç Gündogdyýew (born 1976)	14 June 2018	Incumbent	8 years, 106 days	TDP	–

== Defense ministry institutions, units and areas ==
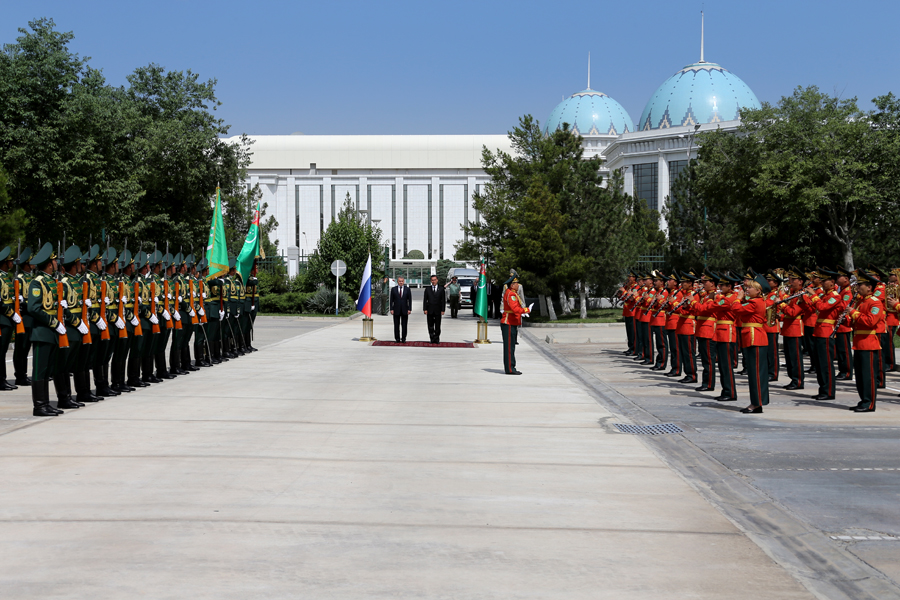
A welcoming ceremony for Sergey Shoigu at the Turkmen defence ministry.

Sections of the defence ministry include some of the following institutions:

- Educational institutions
  - Military Institute of the Ministry of Defense
  - Berdimuhamed Annayev 1st Specialized Military School (Ashgabat)
  - Alp Arslan 2nd Specialized Military School (Dashoguz)
  - Soltan Sanjar 3rd Specialized Military School (Mary)
- Central House of Officers
  - "Merdana nesiller" Ensmeble
  - Military Museum named after Berdimuhamed Annayev
- Center for Emergency Management (opened in January 2011)
- Equestrian Complex of the Ministry of Defense (opened in 2012)
- Central Army Sports Club
- Various military training sites
  - Akdepe Airdrome
  - Kelyata Training Center (Bäherden District of the Ahal Region)
  - Northern Kelete Training Ground (near the village of Kelete)
  - Mountain Training Center "South Kelyata" (near Ashgabat)
  - Ogurja Ada Naval Base
- Milli goşun (newspaper)
- Youth Organization named after Magtymguly of the Ministry of Defense
- Independent Honor Guard Battalion

=== House of Officers ===
Based on the Soviet model, the House of Officers (Turkmen: Merkezi serkerdeller öýüniň) is the main cultural center of the military designed to improve Civil–military relations. It is the equivalent to Military officers' clubs in the United States. Concerts of military ensembles such as the "Merdana nesiller" Ensemble, the Göreldeli Military Band and the "Sherhet Ovazlara" Ensemble of the State Border Service have performed at the House of Officers. The house hosts receptions on holidays such as Defender of the Fatherland Day and Independence Day. A special attraction of the House of Officers is the Museum of Military Glory, where numerous exhibits tell a history of Turkmen military history since the time of Oguz Khan. The building also has a stationary full-time professional television studio that prepares weekly television shows on the Altyn Asyr and Ovaz channels. It frequently hosts guests from the Military Institute and the military school.

=== Milli goşun ===
The Defence Ministry issues its social and political magazine called Milli goşun (National Army) every quarter which has the information about the measures for strengthening of defensive capability of the country.

== Department structure ==
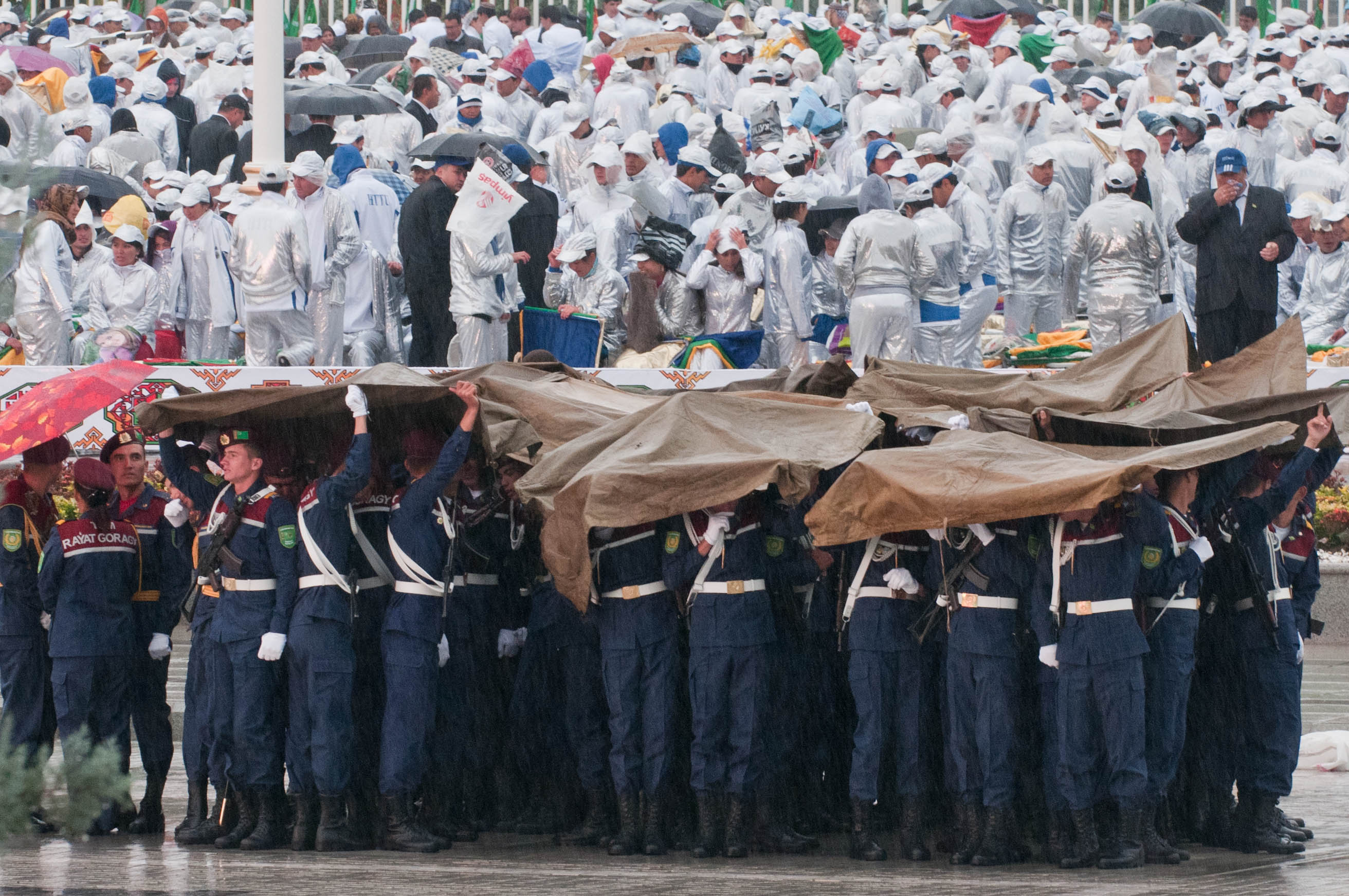
Personnel of the General Directorate of Civil Defense and Rescue at a parade in Ashgabat in 2011.

The defence ministry has the following command structure:

- General Staff
- General Directorate of Armaments
- General Mobilization Directorate
- General Directorate of Civil Defense and Rescue (Turkmen: Raýat goranmak we halas ediş baş müdirligi), it is the civil defence agency for Turkmenistan. It is similar to the Russian Ministry of Emergency Situations. It conducts joint exercises in the territories of industrial enterprises with non-militarized rescue workers of the enterprises themselves, developing tactics in the event of various natural disasters and rescue operations.
- General Directorate of Supply and Logistics
- Educational Directorate

== See also ==
- Ministry of Internal Affairs (Turkmenistan)
