= Military Institute of the Ministry of Defense of Turkmenistan =

- Turkmen: Beýik Saparmyrat Türkmenbaşy adyndaky Türkmenistanyň Goranmak ministrliginiň Harby instituty
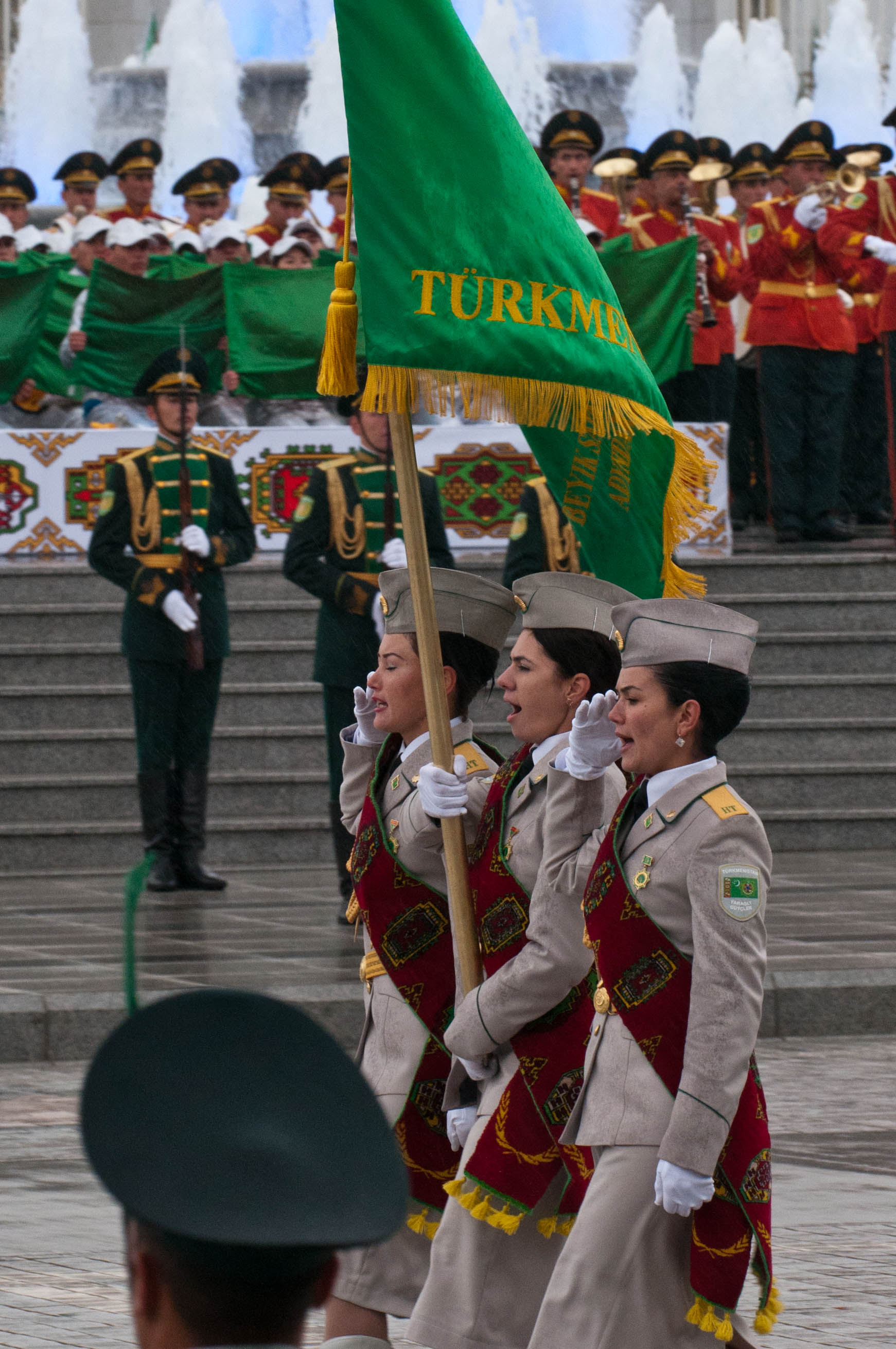
- The female contingent of the institute during an annual parade in Ashgabat in 2011.
- Type: military academy
- Established: September 1, 1993
- Affiliations: Armed Forces of Turkmenistan
- Endowment: Colonel Shamyrat Amanov
- Location: Ashgabat, Turkmenistan
- Language: Turkmen, Russian
- Colors: Green & White

Military Institute of the Ministry of Defense of Turkmenistan named after Great Saparmurad Turkmenbashy (Turkmen: Beýik Saparmyrat Türkmenbaşy adyndaky Türkmenistanyň Goranmak ministrliginiň Harby instituty) is higher military educational institution in the national education system of the Armed Forces of Turkmenistan.

== History ==
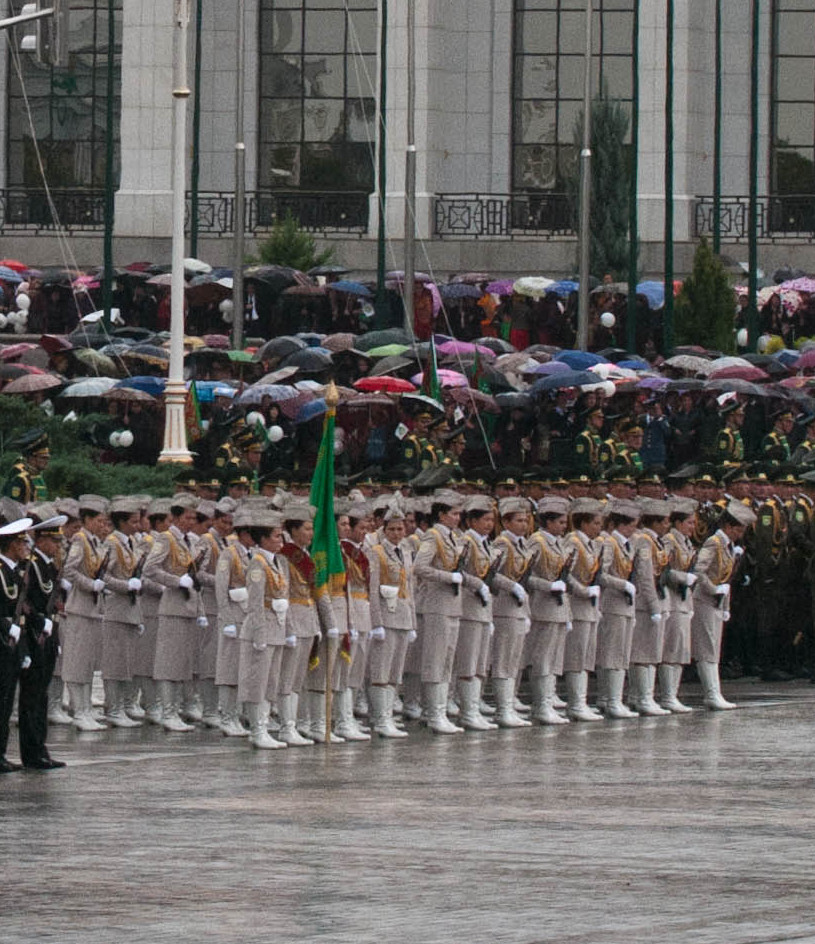
Female cadets of the institute in 2011.

The Military Institute of the Ministry of Defense of Turkmenistan was established on 1 September 1993. The first class of 75 Lieutenants were commissioned in 1996, with another 200 being commissioned in 1997. The institute's former building, where it was located from 2004 to 2012, is a four-story building that has 48 classrooms, computer classes, as well as a lecture and simulator room. The current building was created in January 2012 near the old building.

== Educational overview ==
The Military Institute trains highly qualified commanders of the Armed Forces of Turkmenistan. The duration of study at the Military Institute is 5 academic years. It specializes in infantry, aviation, logistics, and communications. It is made up of 14 departments and has a central library, which among others, contributes to the learning atmosphere. The training specialists known as "cyberfront fighters" in the field of cyber security began in the 2018-2019 academic year. In July 2019, the curriculum of the Military Institute was transferred to a digital system. 5th year military students are sent to military units and assist military commanders, engaging in practical education.

=== Requirements ===
Special requirements to the Military Institute include the following:

- Must be a male citizen under the age of 24 who have completed secondary military service and have volunteered for military service;
- Male citizens under the age of 25 who have graduated from the Special Military Schools of the Ministry of Defense of Turkmenistan;
- Male citizens under the age of 24 who have been released from military service and in reserve;
- Women under the age of 21 who have a secondary education and have volunteered for military service;

Candidates wishing to study at the Military Institute must address their unit commander on this matter. Those admitted to the Military Institute by passing the entrance examination are provided with a dormitory, military uniforms and training aids, as well as regular meals and paid scholarships. Every academic year begins on the Day of Knowledge and Student Youth on 1 September.

== Affiliated schools ==
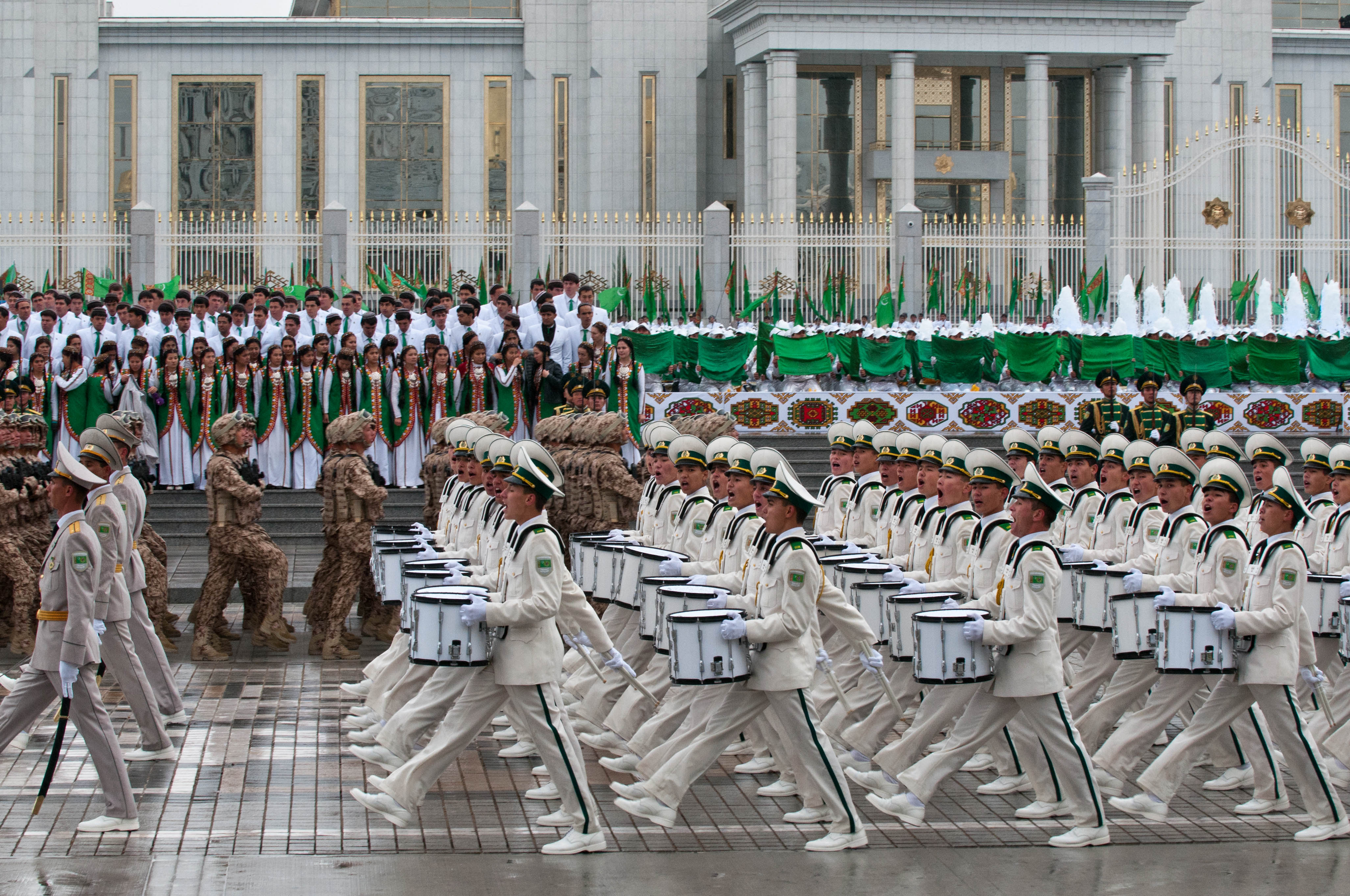
The corps of drums of the Berdimuhamed Annayev 1st Specialized Military School.

The structure of the Military Institute of the Ministry of Defense of Turkmenistan includes 3 secondary specialized military schools:

- Berdimuhamed Annayev 1st Specialized Military School (Ashgabat)
- Alp Arslan 2nd Specialized Military School (Dashoguz)
- Soltan Sanjar 3rd Specialized Military School (Mary)

== Rectors ==
Until 2007, the minister of defense was the de facto rector of the institute.

- Dangatar Kopekov (January 10, 1992 - September 17, 1998)
- Kurbanmuhammed Kasymov (September 17, 1998 - May 24, 1999)
- Batyr Sarjayev (May 24, 1999 - June 26, 2001)
- Major General Gurbandurdy Begenchov (June 26, 2001 - March 14, 2002)
- Rejepbay Arazov (March 14, 2002 - September 19, 2003)
- Agageldi Mammetgeldiyev (September 19, 2003 - February 24, 2007)
- Atamurad Gurdov (February 24, 2007 - July 29, 2008)
- Movlyamkuli Hezretov (January 8, 2008 - February 3, 2011)
- Yusuf Muhammedkuliev (February 3, 2011 - August 2, 2011)
- Khojakuli Ashirov (August 2, 2011 - May 12, 2013)
- Shamurad Amanov (May 12, 2013 – Present)

== Notable alumni ==
- Begench Gundogdyev (class of 1997), Minister of Defense
- Senior Lieutenant Jahan Yazmuhammedova (class of 2014), the first female paratrooper in the Armed Forces of Turkmenistan
- Mergen Gurdov, Head of the Chamber of Commerce and Industry of Turkmenistan

== See also ==
- Armed Forces of Turkmenistan
- Ministry of Defense of Turkmenistan
