= State Migration Service of Turkmenistan =

State governing body that regulates the migration system of Turkmenistan

- Turkmenistan
- Turkmenistan

Agency overview
- Formed: 21 February 2003
- Headquarters: Ashgabat, 63 Azady Street
- Agency executive: Sazakow Amanmuhammet Shyhgulyyevich
- Website: https://migration.gov.tm/en/

The State Migration Service of Turkmenistan is the government agency that regulates the migration system of Turkmenistan, implements state policy in the field of migration, and fulfills Turkmenistan's international obligations in the field of migration.

== History ==
The Service was created on the basis of Presidential Decree No. 6133 of 21 February 2003 with the initial name as the State Service for Registration of Foreign Citizens of Turkmenistan. The service carried out registration of arrivals and departures of foreign citizens, issued invitations and visas for arrival to Turkmenistan, as well as residence permits and work permits. Since 2004, the Service has also performed functions related to registration of the entry and exit of citizens of Turkmenistan at the State border. Since 2005, it has accepted and prepared documents of admission to Turkmenistan citizenship, reinstatement of citizenship of Turkmenistan, renunciation of citizenship of Turkmenistan, as well as registration of permits for citizens of Turkmenistan to leave Turkmenistan for permanent residence. On 17 April 2008, the State Service of Turkmenistan for the Registration of Foreign Citizens was renamed the State Migration Service of Turkmenistan. Since July 2008, the State Migration Service of Turkmenistan has issued biometric passports to citizens of Turkmenistan in accordance with international standards (ICAO). Passports are currently issued in all regional administrations of Turkmenistan and Ashgabat, as well as district and city departments.

== Departments ==
- Department of Ashgabat
- Department of Arkadag
- Department of Ahal Region
- Department of Balkan Region
- Department of Daşoguz Region
- Department of Lebap Region
- Department of Mary Region
