= Ministry for National Security (Turkmenistan) =

Government ministry of Turkmenistan

- Türkmenistanyň Milli howpsuzlyk ministrilgi
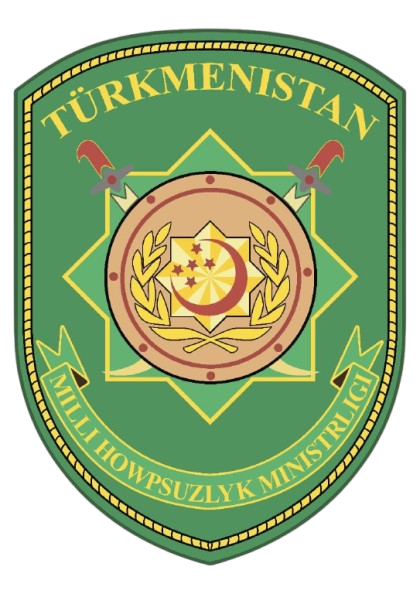
- Seal of the ministry

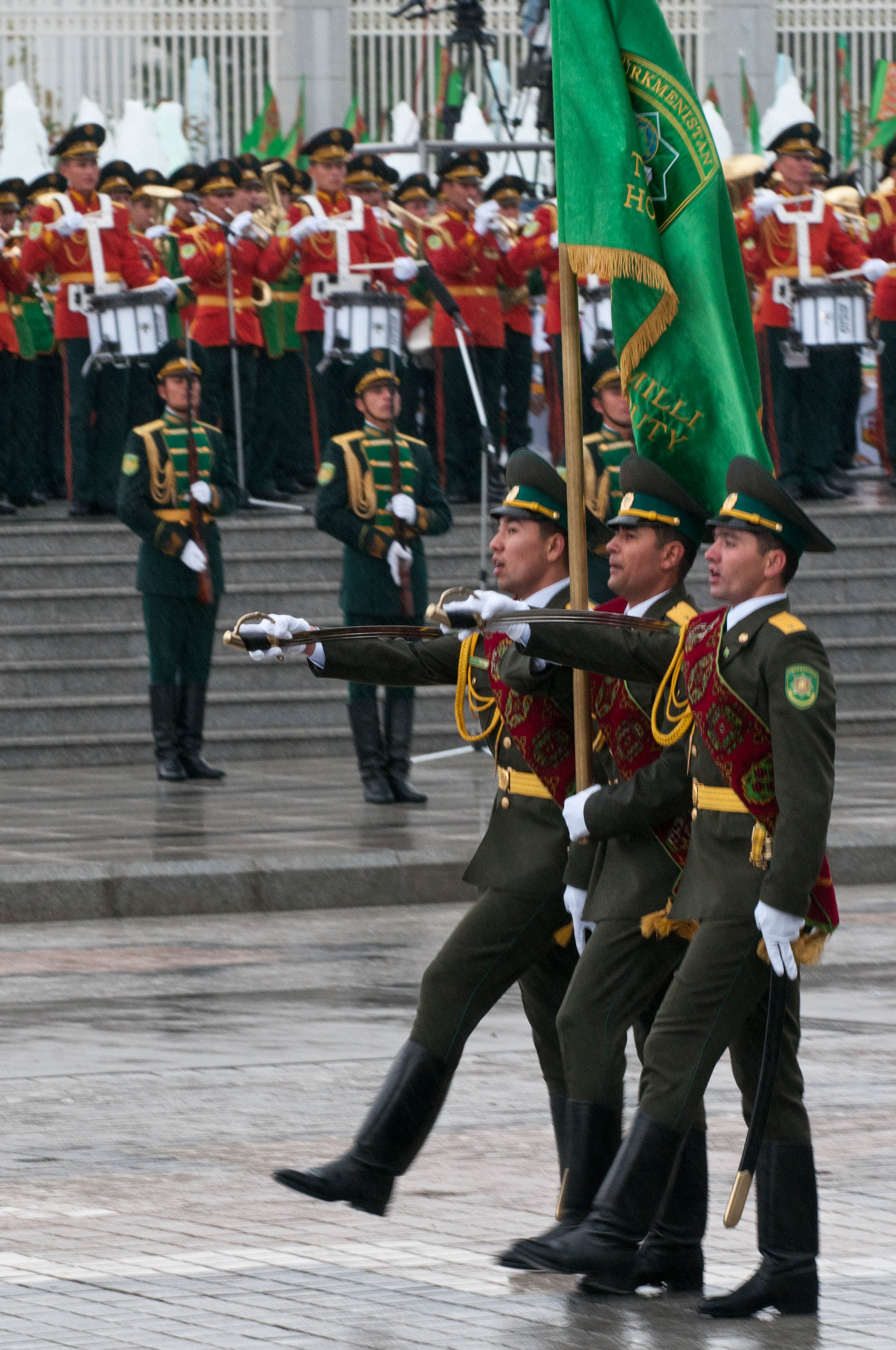
- Cadets of the MNB Institute

Agency overview
- Formed: September 20, 1991
- Preceding agency: KGB of the Turkmen SSR
- Jurisdiction: President of Turkmenistan; Government of Turkmenistan
- Headquarters: 2033 Magtymguly Street, Ashgabat, Turkmenistan
- Employees: classified
- Annual budget: classified
- Minister responsible: Dovletgeldi Meredov
- Parent department: Committee for National Security

The Ministry for National Security or MNS (Turkmen: Türkmenistanyň Milli howpsuzlyk ministrilgi) is the secret police agency for the government of Turkmenistan. It is composed largely of the remnants of KGB organs left over after the collapse of the Soviet Union; its functions remain largely the same as well. The MNB and the national police force are under the direction of the Ministry of Internal Affairs. Until 2002, it was known as the KNB (Committee for National Security).

== History ==
The ministry was established by President Saparmurat Niyazov in September 1991 as the National Security Committee. It succeeded the Committee for State Security, or the KGB of the Turkmen SSR, which was the republican affiliate of the uniformed security agency of the USSR. Some units of the KNB were also former on the basis of a special purpose police unit of the Public Order Protection Directorate of the Interior Ministry of the Turkmen SSR. In June 2000, President Saparmurat Niyazov proposed the creation of a council that would include the KNB, the Ministry of Internal Affairs and the Ministry of Foreign Affairs and control the movement of foreigners temporarily residing in Turkmenistan. In the fall of 2001, the staff of the KNB was increased by 1,000 people and brought up to 2,500. The MNB Institute was established in August 2012 to provide higher level training to its personnel. The Counter Terrorism Training Center of the MNB was also opened in the capital in October 2005 as a training institution.

== List of ministers of national security ==
- Dangatar Kopekov (March 1991 - January 1992)
- Allaşukur Owezjew (January 1992 - May 1992)
- Saparmyrat Seýidow (May 1992 - February 1997)
- Muhammed Nazarow (April 1997 - March 2002)
- Poran Berdiýew (May 2002 - September 2002)
- Batyr Busakow (September 2002 - November 2003)
- Annageldi Gummanow (November 2003 - December 2004)
- Geldimuhammed Aşyrmuhammedow (December 2004 - October 2007)
- Çarymyrat Amanow (October 2007 - March 29, 2011)
- Ýaýlym Berdiýew (March 29, 2011 - October 5, 2015)
- Guýçgeldi Hojaberdiýew (October 5, 2015 - March 1, 2016)
- Dowrangeldi Baýramow (March 1, 2016 - June 14, 2018)
- Yaylym Berdiyev (June 14, 2018 - February 12, 2020)
- Gurbanmyrat Annayev (February 12, 2020 – 3 February 2023)
- Nazar Atagaraev (Since 3 February 2023)

== Structure ==
- 1st MNB Department
  - 1st Division
- 2nd MNB Department
  - 1st Division
  - 2nd Division
  - 3rd Division
- 4th MNB Department
  - 1st Division
  - 2nd Division
  - 3rd Division
- Management Department
  - 1st Division
  - 2nd Division
  - 3rd Division
- MNB Department for Ahal
- MNB Department for Balkan
- MNB Department for Dashoguz
- MNB Department for Lebap
  - 11th Division
- MNB Department for Mary
  - 1st Division
- MNB Institute
- Central Hospital of the Border Troops and the Ministry of National Security (Bekrovinskoe Highway, Ashgabat)

The State Border Service of Turkmenistan falls under the MNB.

== Controversies ==
=== Drug trafficking ===
==== Purges ====
After the events of 11 September and the defeat of the Taliban in Afghanistan, President Niyazov began to remove witnesses to the drug trade, with a "purge" being carried out in the KNB that saw dozens of officers involved in drug trafficking on behalf of Niyazov receiving many years of prison sentences. Among them was former border troops commander Akmurad Kabulov, who aided in drug couriers crossing of the Turkmen border.

==== Execution of Vitaly Usachev ====
In 1996, Major Vitaly Usachev from the State Border Service, who served as head of the border post at Ashgabat International Airport, opened containers from Afghanistan that were typically the responsibility of the KNB, finding several hundredweight of heroin. This resulted in the KNB accusing Usachev of possessing heroin, after which he was taken into custody. On the eve of the trial, the chief of the border troops, General Kabulov, came to the major's cell and reassured him that everything would be fine. Despite this, the court convicted him as being guilty, after which he was given a death-sentence that was carried out immediately.

==== Death of Gavrilov ====
In November 2006, Nikolai Gavrilov, the former head of the operational department for combating drug trafficking in the MNB, was killed with his wife in their apartment in Ashgabat. While working in the ministry, Gavrilov was reportedly aware of the connection of some of the country's top leaders with drug smuggling. In particular, Gavrilov participated in the exposure of the country's Prosecutor General in 2003. Prior to his death, it was revealed that he was planning to move to Russia, which caused the authorities to prevent Gavrilov's departure, fearing that the MNB's sponsorship of state drug trafficking would become known.

=== Raid on the Uzbek embassy ===
In November 2002, President Niyazov, who at the time had just survived an assassination attempt, accused Uzbekistan and its ambassador in Ashgabat Abdurashid Kadyrov, of assisting the alleged coup leader, former Foreign minister Boris Şyhmyradow. A month later, the special forces of the KNB raided the Embassy of Uzbekistan in Ashgabat on 16 December to look for Şyhmyradow. The raid violated the Vienna Convention on the Immunity of Diplomatic Missions and Diplomats. The KNB authorities justified their actions by saying that they were trying to “search for terrorists hiding in the embassy”. As a result, Uzbek President Islam Karimov on principle refused to personally participate in the funeral of Niyazov several years later due to the KNB's raid.

=== Human rights concerns ===
Amnesty International has claimed that the MNB has persecuted Turkmens for their religious beliefs, and that only members of the Russian Orthodox Church and Sunni Muslims are tolerated. Human Rights Watch has asserted that the KNB has repeatedly imprisoned and harassed political opponents. Both organizations cite the use of torture by KNB agents.

=== Firing of Minister Bayramow ===
On 13 July 2018, Minister of National Security Dowrangeldi Baýramow was abruptly fired and demoted from colonel to major for "serious shortcomings" in his work. No further explanation was provided by official media. However, opposition media reported that the chief of the 4th Directorate of the Ministry of National Security and certain subordinates had been arrested and charged with trading dollars on the black market. This presumably was the cause of Baýramow's downfall.

== See also ==
- Human rights in Turkmenistan
- Intelligence (information gathering)
- KGB
- List of intelligence agencies
- Armed Forces of Turkmenistan
