= State Border Service of Turkmenistan =

Border guard agency of the Armed Forces of Turkmenistan

State Border Guard Service of Turkmenistan Türkmenistan Döwlet Serhet Gullugy
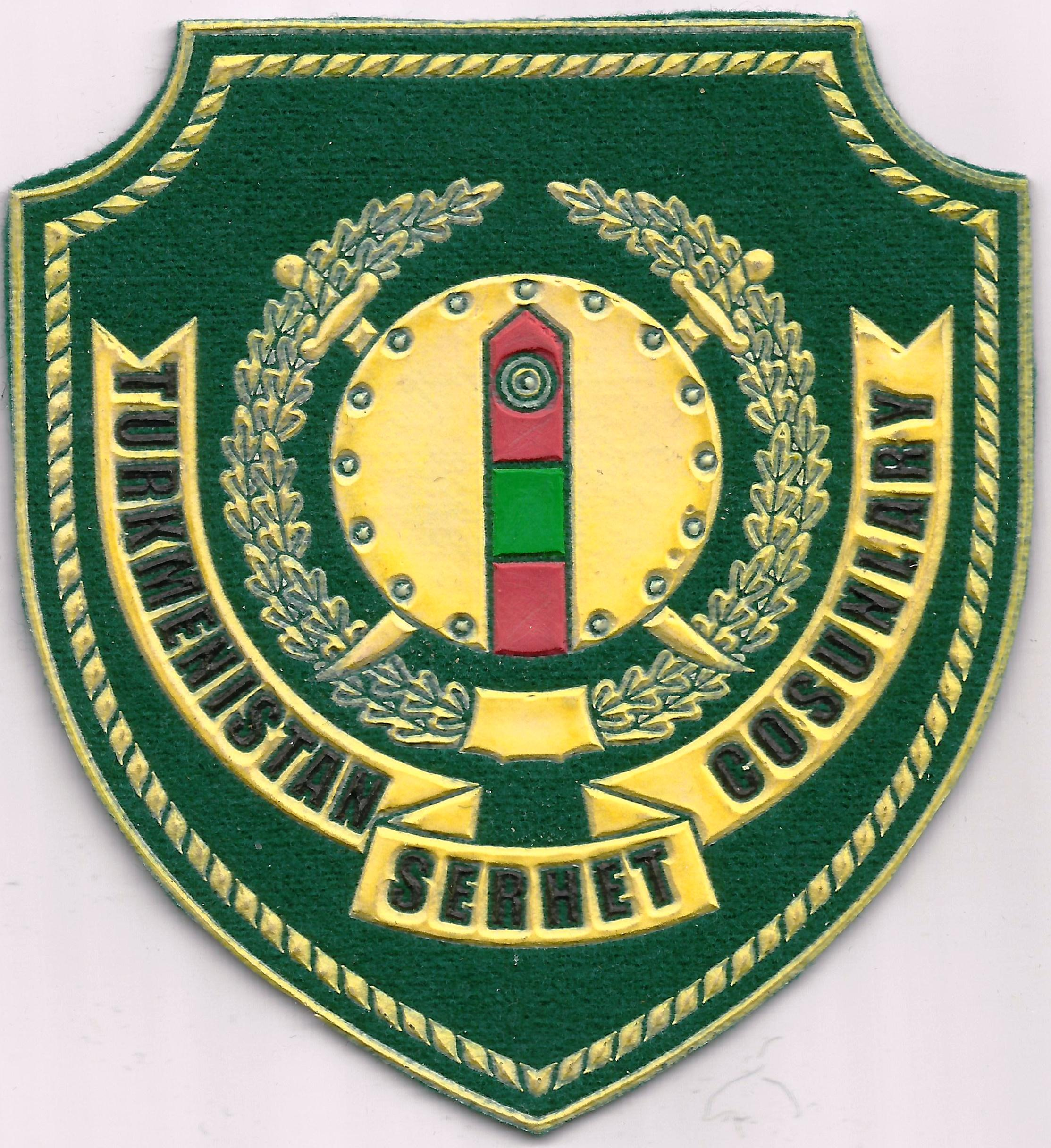
- Emblem of the State Border Guard Service

Agency overview
- Formed: August 11, 1992
- Preceding agency: Soviet Border Troops

Jurisdictional structure
- Operations jurisdiction: Turkmenistan
- Specialist jurisdiction: National border patrol, security, integrity

Operational structure
- Headquarters: Ashgabat
- Agency executive: Colonel Ilaman Myratgulyevich Ilamanov, Chief of the State Border Service of Turkmenistan, Commander of Border Troops

The State Border Service (SBS) (Turkmen: Döwlet Serhet Gullugy, DSG) also commonly known by its paramilitary force as the Turkmen Border Troops is a border guard agency of the Armed Forces of Turkmenistan.

== History ==
The service was established on 11 August 1992, by order of President Saparmyrat Nyýazow, on the basis of the Soviet Border Troops in the Turkestan Military District. Until 1997, the Armed Forces of Turkmenistan included the Border Troops of the Ministry of Defense, which were then transformed into the State Border Service. It cooperated with Russian border guards who remained in country until 1999 as a result of a joint Russian–Turkmen agreement on the protection of the state border of Turkmenistan, which was signed in 1993. It slowly evolved to meet the standards of its counterparts, with the DSG being allowed to inspect goods and other items transported across the border of Turkmenistan in April 1998. At the end of 2001, 3 new border detachments were created, with 2 (in Kushka and Köýtendag), being intensified the cover of the Afghan border to prevent Taliban fighters from taking refuge in the country during the War in Afghanistan. Recently, the service created a separate naval border patrol division stationed in Türkmenbaşy. In 2014, there were several incidents for the service along the Afghanistan–Turkmenistan border, including one in February when Turkmen border guards killed a militant who crossed the border illegally and in retaliation three Turkmen border guards were killed later that month. Later that May, three Turkmen guards were killed by an armed group crossing the border from Ghormach District, Afghanistan.

== Responsibilities ==
The main tasks of the service include the following:

- Protecting of the national border of the country
- Combating international terrorism and drug trafficking
- Targeting illegal migration and human trafficking
- Protecting oil and gas platforms and pipelines in the Turkmen sector of the Caspian Sea.

The head of the service is a member of the Council of Border Guard Commanders of the Commonwealth of Independent States (CIS).

== Structure ==
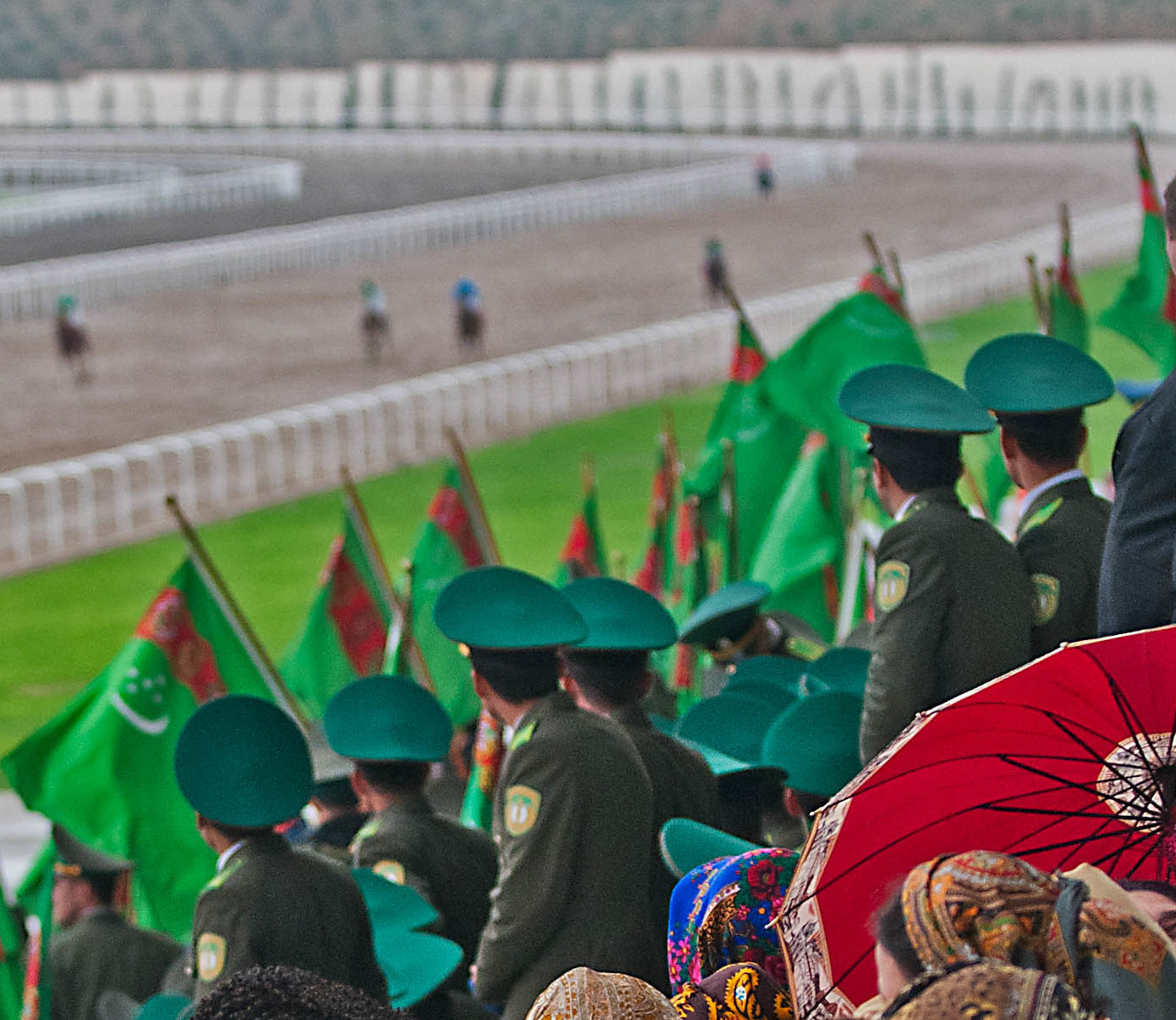
Personnel of the service at the International Equestrian Sports Complex.

- Central Office
- Border Troops
  - Headquarters of the Border Troops of Turkmenistan
    - Atamurat Border Detachment
      - Border Outpost "Syakhralyk"
    - Ashgabat Border Detachment
      - Border Outpost "Archabil"
      - Border Outpost "Asuda"
      - Border Outpost "Bagir"
      - Border Outpost "Bitaraplyk"
      - Border Outpost "Vatan"
      - Border Outpost "Gindivar"
    - Balkanabat Training Border Detachment
    - Bakharly Border Detachment
    - Garabogaz Border Detachment
    - Dashoguz Border Detachment
    - Kaahka Border Detachment
      - Border Outpost "Aksuv"
      - Border Outpost "Yashlyk"
    - Makhtumkuli Border Detachment
    - Serakhs Border Detachment
      - Border Outpost "Incirli"
    - Serhetabat Border Detachment
      - Border Outpost "Medesan"
    - Takhtabazar Border Detachment
      - Border Outpost "Watanchi"
      - Border Outpost "Garavulkhana"
      - Border Outpost "Murghab"
      - Border Outpost "Pendy"
    - Turkmenabat Border Detachment
    - Esenguly Border Detachment
    - Etrek Border Detachment
    - Caspian Sea Border Detachment
    - Separate Maritime Border Guard Detachment (Türkmenbaşy)
    - 17th Separate Border Aviation Regiment (Mary)
- Music Group "Border Sounds"
- Turkmen Alabai Center
- Turkmen State Border Service Institute

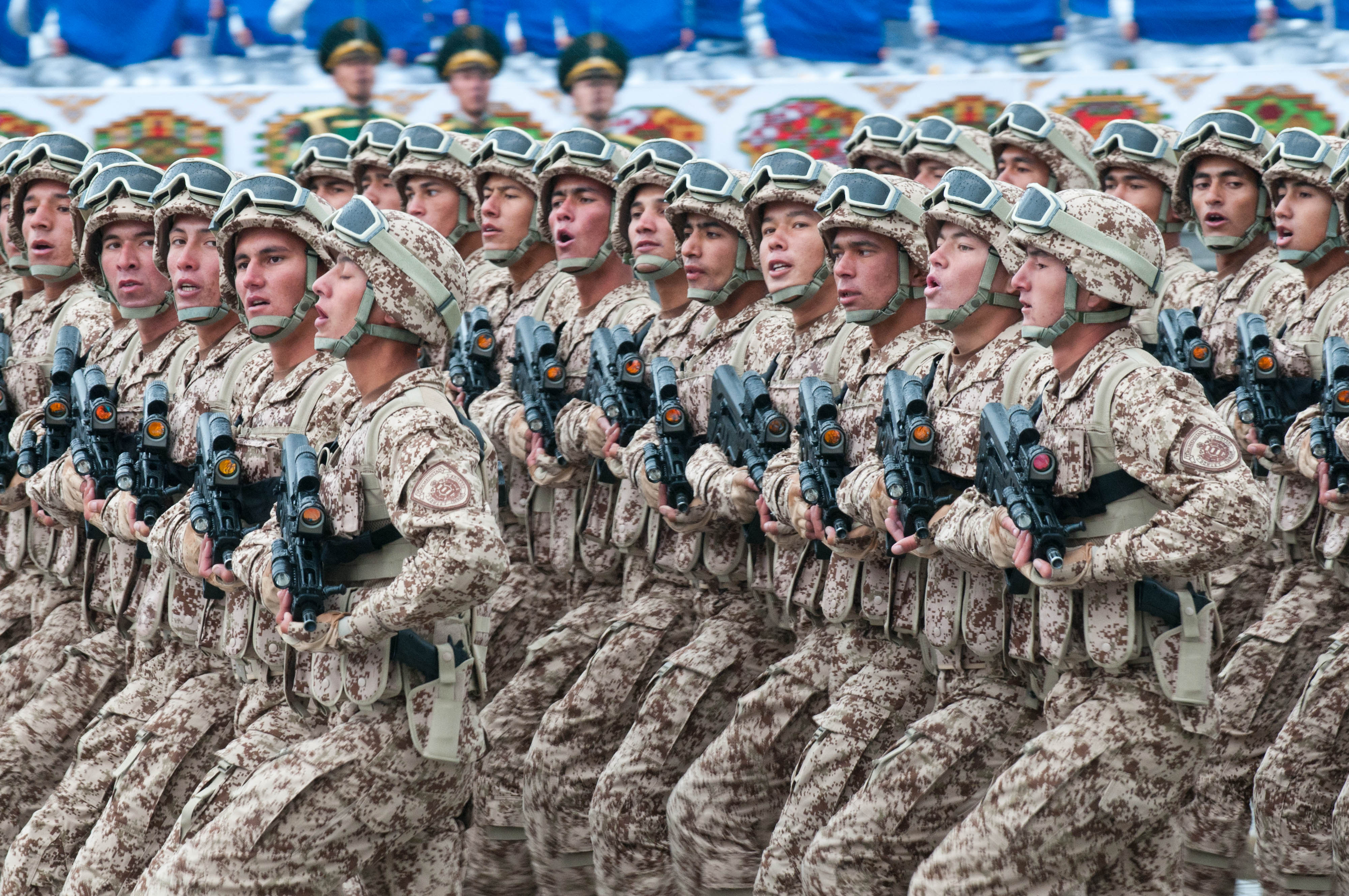
The troops of the DSG on parade.

== Breastplate "Valiant Border Guard" ==
The Breastplate "Valiant Border Guard" is the state medal designed to honour members of the DSG. It consists of medals in both the first and second degrees. It has the shape of a regular green octagon, which is one of the main elements of the State Emblem of Turkmenistan, inscribed in an circle with a diameter of 40 mm. It was created on 20 December 2005.

== Leadership ==
- Colonel General Akmurad Kabulov (1992 – 1999)
- Major General Tirkish Tyrmyev
- Major General Agageldi Mammetgeldiyev (2002 – 2003)
- Major General Annageldy Gummanov (2003)
- Major General Annaur Atzhanov (2003 – 2004)
- Lieutenant General Orazberdy Soltanov (2014 – 2006)
- Major General Bayram Alovov (2006 – 2009)
- Lieutenant General Myrat Islamov (2009 – 2012)
- Major General Aman Garayev (2012 – 2013)
- Lieutenant General Myrat Islamov (2013 – 2016)
- Major General Begenç Gündogdyýew (2016 – 2018)
- Colonel Shadurdy Durdyyev (2018 – 2021)
- Colonel Ýazgeldi Bäşimowiç Nuryýew (2021–2026)
- Ilaman Myratgulyevich Ilamanov, January 2026

== See also ==
- Armed Forces of Turkmenistan
- Ministry of Defense (Turkmenistan)
- Chief of the General Staff (Turkmenistan)
- Turkmen National Guard
- Turkmen Ground Forces
- Turkmen Air Force
- Turkmen Navy
