= List of universities in Turkmenistan =

This is a list of post-secondary colleges and universities in Turkmenistan.

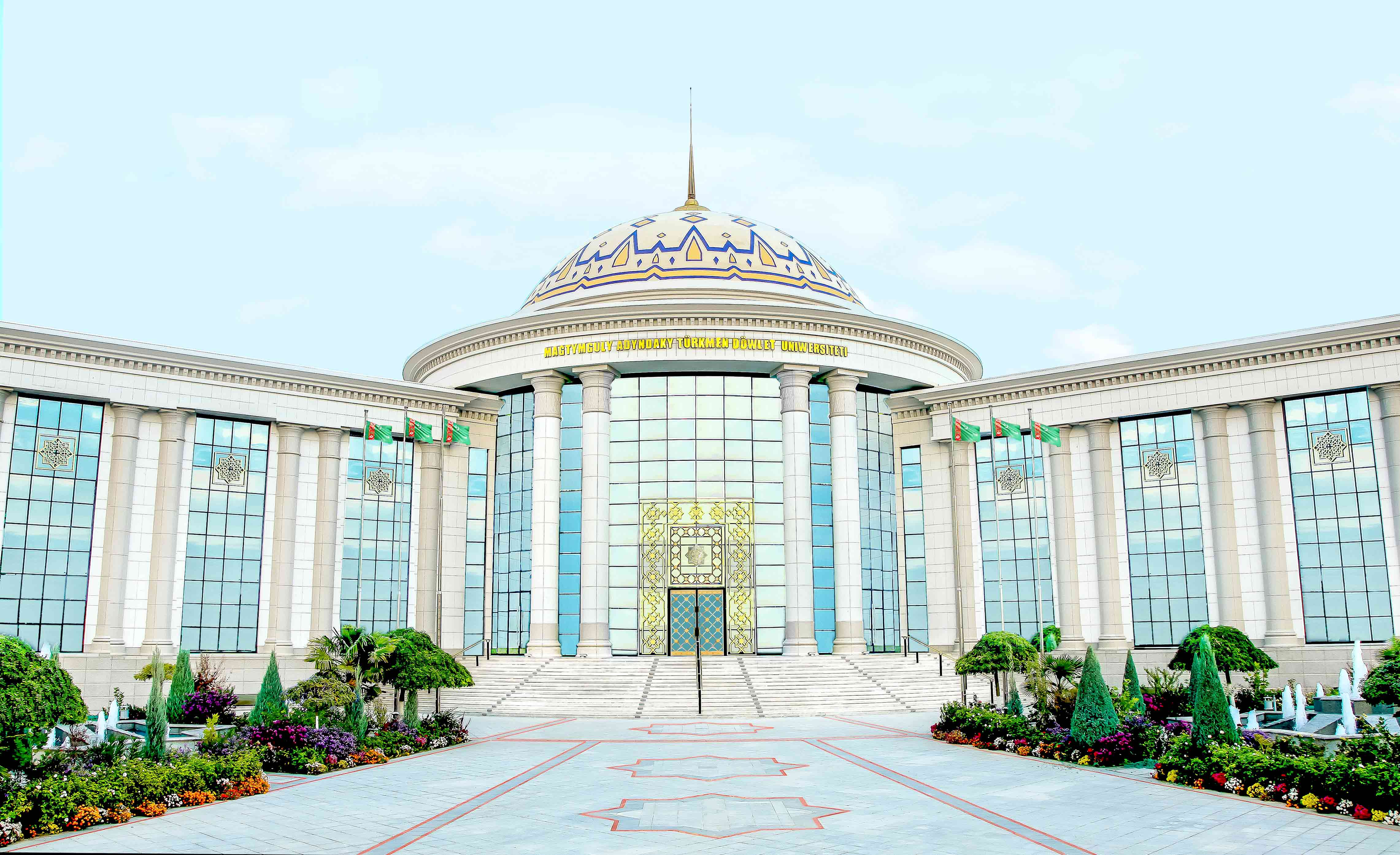
Turkmen State University

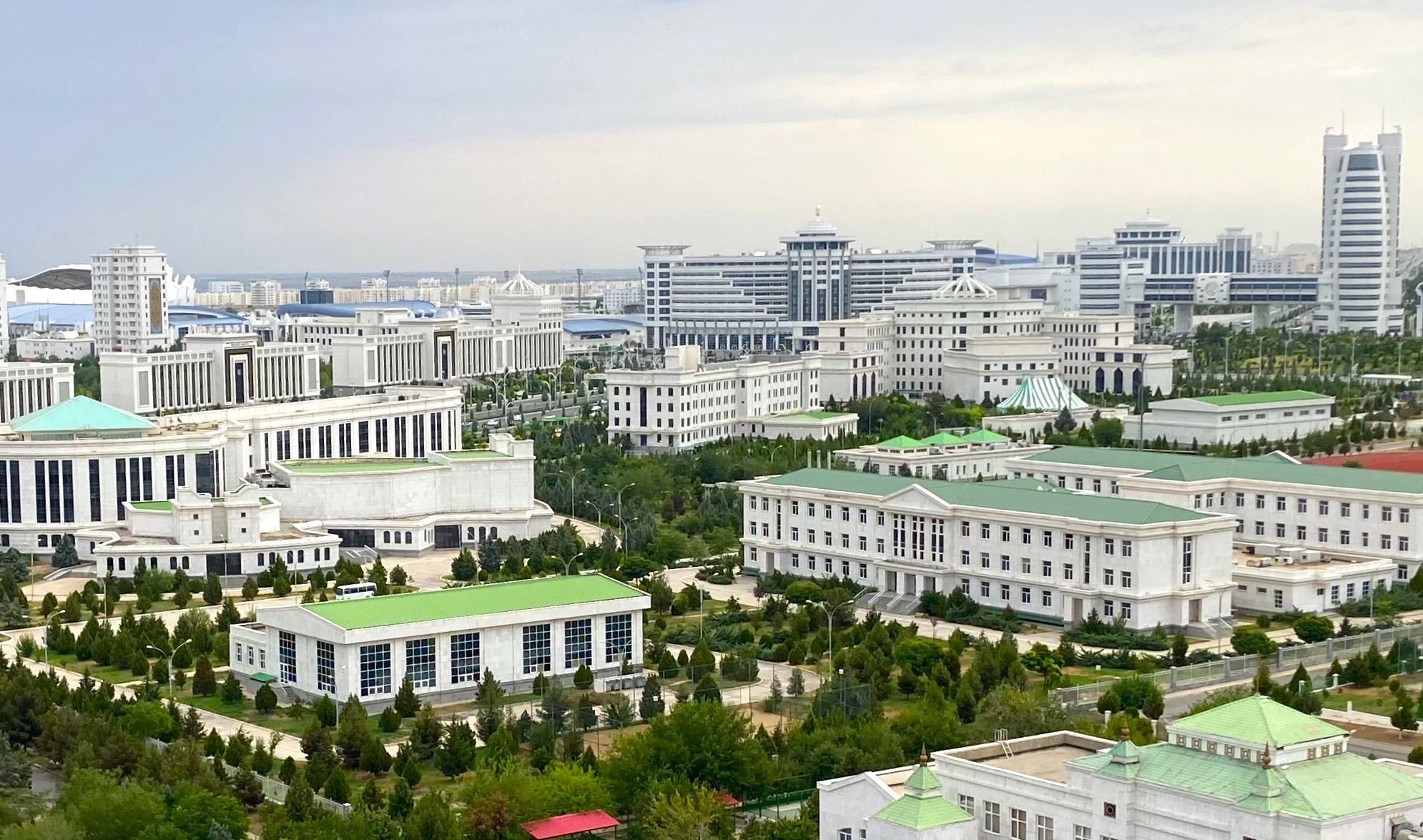
Turkmen State Institute of Culture campus

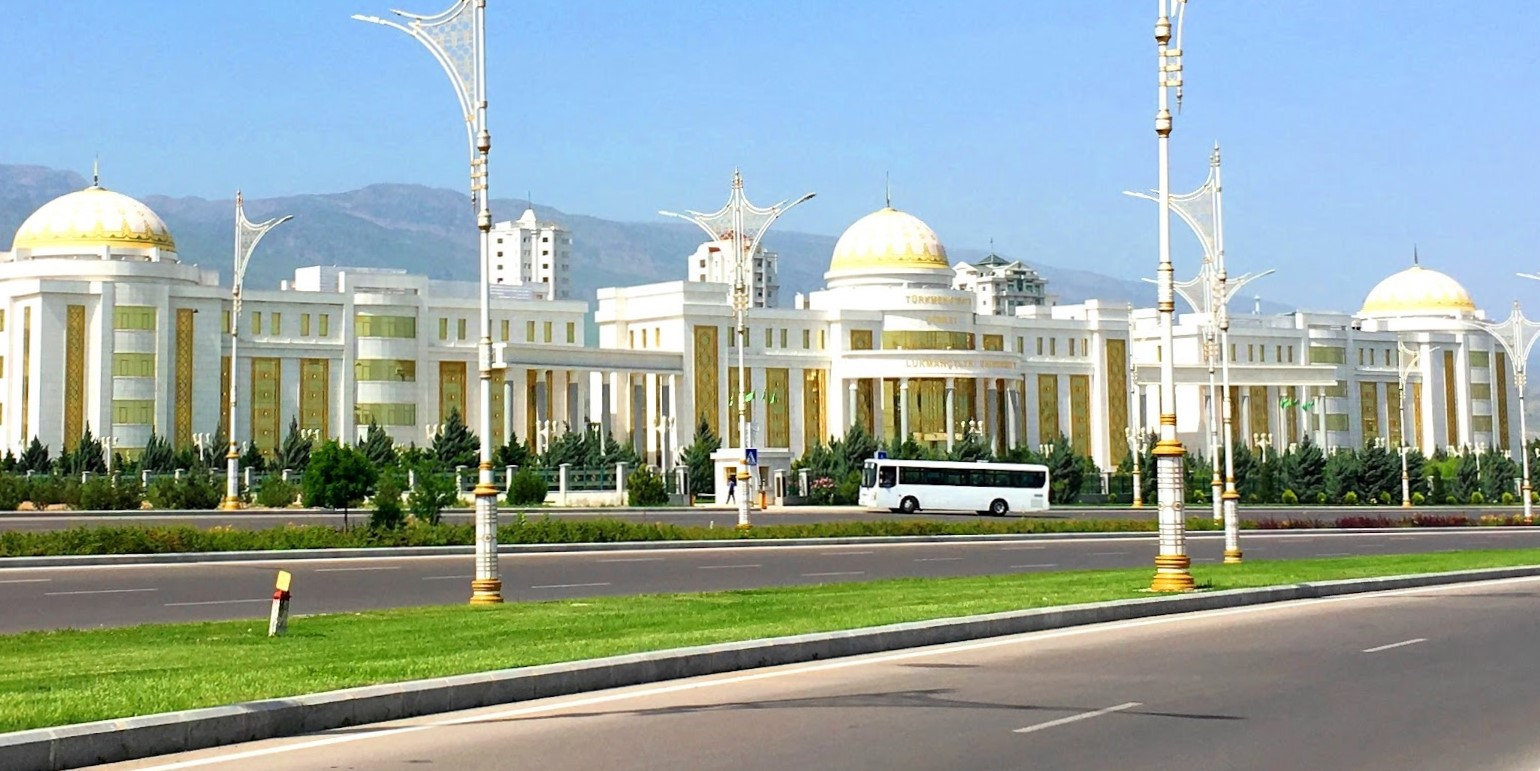
Turkmen State Medical University

Turkmen Institute of Economics and Management in Ashgabat

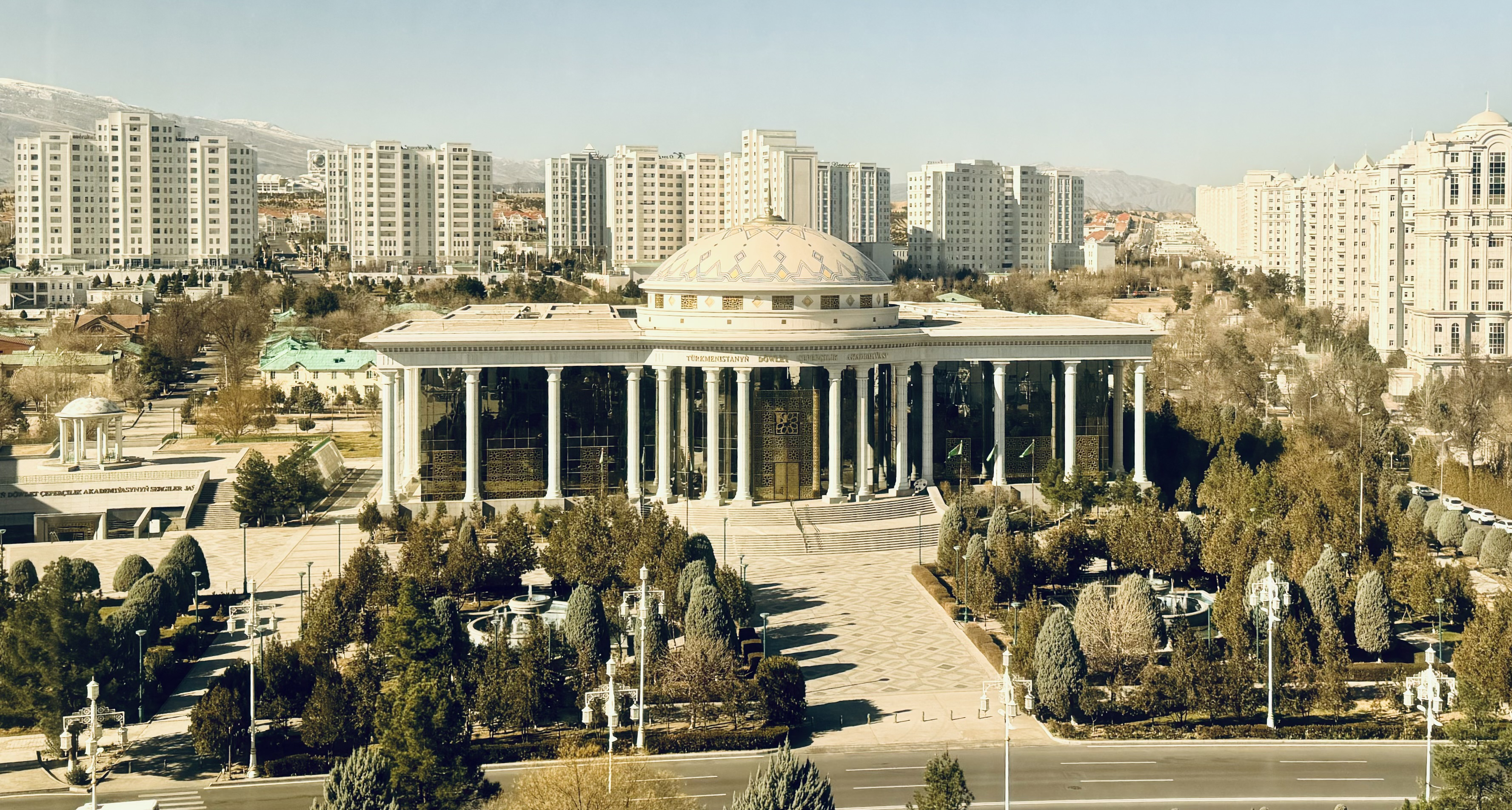
State Academy of Arts of Turkmenistan

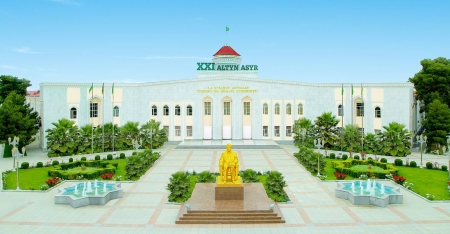
Turkmen Agricultural University

International Oil and Gas University

== Degree-granting institutions ==
This list includes degree-granting institutions of higher education (Turkmen: Ýokary hünär bilimi edaralary) offering bachelor's degrees and in some cases master's degrees. Unless noted otherwise, institutions in this table are located in the city of Ashgabat.

English	Turkmen
International University of Industrialists and Entrepreneurs (2025) (Ashgabat)	Halkara senagatçylar we telekeçiler uniwersiteti
Aba Annayev International Equestrian Academy (2023) (Arkadag)	Aba Annaýew adyndaky Halkara Atçylyk Akademiýasy
Dovletmamed Azady Turkmen National Institute of World Languages	Döwletmämmet Azady adyndaky Türkmen Milli Dünýä Dilleri Instituty
Institute of Engineering, Transport and Communications of Turkmenistan (2019)	Türkmenistanyň Inžener-Tehniki we Ulag Kommunikasiýalary Instituty
Institute of International Relations of the Ministry of Foreign Affairs of Turkmenistan	Türkmenistanyň Daşary Işler Ministrliginiň Halkara Gatnaşyklary Instituty
Institute of Telecommunications and Informatics of Turkmenistan (2019)	Türkmenistanyň Telekommunikasiýalar we Informatika Instituty
International University of Humanities and Development	Halkara Ynsanperwer Ylymlary we Ösüş Uniwersiteti
Magtymguly Turkmen State University	Magtymguly adyndaky Türkmen Döwlet Uniwersiteti
Maya Kuliyeva Turkmen National Conservatory	Maýa Kulyýewa adyndaky Türkmen Milli Konserwatoriýasy
Myrat Garryyev Turkmen State Medical University	Myrat Garryýew adyndaky Türkmenistanyň Döwlet Lukmançylyk Uniwersiteti
Oguzhan University of Engineering Technologies	Türkmenistanyň Oguz Han adyndaky Inžener-Tehnologiýalar Uniwersiteti
S.A. Niyazov Turkmen Agricultural University	S.A.Nyýazow adyndaky Türkmen Oba Hojalyk Uniwersiteti
Seyitnazar Seydi Turkmen State Pedagogical Institute (Turkmenabat)	Seýitnazar Seýdi adyndaky Türkmen Döwlet Mugallymçylyk Instituty
State Academy of Arts of Turkmenistan	Türkmenistanyň Döwlet Çeperçilik Akademiýasy
Turkmen Institute of Finance	Türkmen Döwlet Maliýe Instituty
Turkmen State Agricultural Institute (Dashoguz)	Türkmen Oba Hojalyk Instituty
Turkmen State Institute of Architecture and Construction	Türkmen Döwlet Binagärlik-Gurluşyk Instituty
Turkmen State Institute of Culture	Türkmen Döwlet Medeniýet Instituty
Turkmen State Institute of Economics and Management	Türkmen Döwlet Ykdysadyýet we Dolandyryş Instituty
National Institute of Sports and Tourism of Turkmenistan	Türkmen Döwlet Bedenterbiýe we Sport Instituty
Turkmen State Power Engineering Institute (Mary)	Türkmenistanyň Döwlet Energetika Instituty
Turkmenistan Presidential Academy of Government Service	Türkmenistanyň Prezidentiniň ýanyndaky Döwlet Gullugy Akademiýasy
Yagshygeldi Kakayev International Oil and Gas University	Ýagşygeldi Kakaýew adyndaky Halkara Nebit we Gaz Uniwersiteti

== Secondary Professional Educational Institutions ==
These institutions (Turkmen: Orta hünär bilimi edaralary) require applicants to have graduated from a standard secondary school, and thus are post-secondary institutions. Durations of courses of study at institutions included in this list range from one to two-and-a-half years.

=== Agriculture ===
- Ashgabat Agro-Industrial Secondary Vocational School (Turkmen: Aşgabat Agrosenagat Orta Hünär Okuw Mekdebi)
- Bayramaly Agro-Industrial Secondary Vocational School (Turkmen: Baýramaly Agrosenagat Orta Hünär Okuw Mekdebi), Baýramaly
- Dashoguz Agro-Industrial Secondary Vocational School (Turkmen: Daşoguz Agrosenagat Orta Hünär Okuw Mekdebi), Dashoguz
- Turkmenabat Agro-Industrial Secondary Vocational School (Turkmen: Türkmenabat Agrosenagat Orta Hünär Okuw Mekdebi), Turkmenabat

=== Art ===
- Ahal Province Special School of Art (Turkmen: Ahal Welaýat Ýörite Sungat Mekdebi)
- Balkan Province Special School of Art (Turkmen: Balkan Welaýat Ýörite Sungat Mekdebi), Balkanabat
- Lebap Province Special School of Art (Turkmen: Lebap Welaýat Ýörite Sungat Mekdebi), Turkmenabat
- Magtymguly Garlyyev Dashoguz Special School of Art (Turkmen: Daşoguzyň Magtymguly Garlyýew adyndaky Ýörite Sungat Mekdebi), Dashoguz
- Sahy Jepbarov Arkadag Special School of Art (Turkmen: Sahy Jepbarow adyndaky Arkadag şäher Ýörite Sungat Mekdebi), Arkadag
- Turkmen State School of Culture and Arts (Turkmen: Türkmen Döwlet Medeniýet we Sungat Mekdebi)

=== Banking, Economics, Finance ===
- Ahal Province Financial and Economic Secondary Vocational School (Turkmen: Ahal Welaýat Maliýe-Ykdysady Orta Hünär Okuw Mekdebi), Gökdepe
- Ashgabat Financial and Economic Secondary Vocational School (Turkmen: Aşgabat Maliýe-Ykdysady Orta Hünär Okuw Mekdebi)
- Balkan Province Financial and Economic Secondary Vocational School (Turkmen: Balkan Welaýat Maliýe-Ykdysady Orta Hünär Okuw Mekdebi), Gyzylarbat
- Dashoguz Province Financial and Economic Secondary Vocational School (Turkmen: Daşoguz Welaýat Maliýe-Ykdysady Orta Hünär Okuw Mekdebi), Dashoguz
- Hero Atamyrat Nyyazow Specialized Banking School (Turkmen: Gahrymany Atamyrat Nyýazow adyndaky Ýöriteleşdirilen Bank Mekdebi)
- Lebap Province Financial-Economic Secondary Vocational School (Turkmen: Lebap Welaýat Maliýe-Ykdysady Orta Hünär Okuw Mekdebi), Turkmenabat
- Mary Province Financial-Economic Secondary Vocational School (Turkmen: Mary Welaýat Maliýe-Ykdysady Orta Hünär Okuw Mekdebi), Mary
- Trade and Cooperative School of the Ministry of Trade and Foreign Economic Relations (Turkmen: Söwda we Daşary Ykdysady Aragatnaşyklar Ministrliginiň Söwda-Kooperatiw Mekdebi)

=== Energy ===
- Ashgabat Energy Secondary Vocational School of the Ministry of Energy of Turkmenistan (Turkmen: Türkmenistanyň Energetika Ministrliginiň Aşgabat Energetika Orta Hünär Okuw Mekdebi)
- Balkanabat Petroleum Secondary Vocational School (Turkmen: Balkanabat Nebitçilik Orta Hünär Okuw Mekdebi),Balkanabat
- Mary Oil and Gas Secondary Vocational School (Turkmen: Mary Nebitgaz Orta Hünär Okuw Mekdebi), Mary

=== Engineering ===
- Air Transport Personnel Training School of the "Turkmenhowayollary" Agency (Turkmen: Türkmenistanyň Ministrler Kabinetiniň Ýanyndaky Ulag we Kommunikasiýalar Agentliginiň «Türkmenhowaýollary» Agentligi)
- Ashgabat Construction Secondary Vocational School (Turkmen: Aşgabat Gurluşyk Orta Hünär Okuw Mekdebi)
- Mary Public Utilities Secondary Vocational School (Turkmen: Mary Şäherindäki Jemagat Hojalygy Orta Hünär Okuw Mekdebi), Mary
- Mechanical-Technological Secondary Vocational School of the Ministry of Textile Industry (Turkmen: Dokma Senagaty Ministrliginiň Aşgabat Şäherindäki Mehanika-Tehnologiki Orta Hünär Okuw Mekdebi)
- Polytechnic Secondary Vocational School of the "Turkmenaratshik" Agency of the Transport and Communications Agency (Turkmen: Ulag we Kommunikasiýalar Agentliginiň «Türkmenaragatnaşyk» Agentliginiň Politehniki Orta Hünär Okuw Mekdebi)
- Publishing and Printing Secondary Vocational School of the Turkmen State Publishing Service (Turkmen: Türkmen Döwlet Neşirýat Gullugynyň Neşirýat-Çaphana Orta Hünär Okuw Mekdebi)
- Railway Transport Secondary Vocational School (Turkmen: Demir Ýol Ulaglary Orta Hünär Okuw Mekdebi)
- Technical Secondary Vocational School of the State Concern "Turkmenhimiya" (Turkmen: “Türkmenhimiýa” Döwlet Konserniniň Tehniki Orta Hünär Okuw Mekdebi), Turkmenabat

=== Merchant Marine ===
- Maritime Vocational School (Turkmen: Derýaçylyk Orta Hünär Okuw Mekdebi), Turkmenabat
- Turkmenbashy Marine Secondary Vocational School (Turkmen: Deňizçilik orta hünär mekdebi), Türkmenbaşy

=== Music ===
- Danatar Ovezov Turkmen State Special School of Music (Turkmen: Maýa Kulyýewa adyndaky Türkmen Milli Konserwatoriýasynyň Ýanyndaky Daňatar Öwezow adyndaky Türkmen Döwlet Ýörite Sazçylyk Mekdebi)
- Yolaman Hummayev Mary Special School of Music (Turkmen: Marynyň Ýolaman Hummaýew adyndaky Ýörite Sazçylyk Mekdebi), Mary

=== Nursing and paramedicine ===
- Balkan Medical School (Turkmen: Balkan Lukmançylyk Orta Okuw Mekdebi), Balkanabat
- Gurbansoltan Eje Dashoguz Medical School (Turkmen: Gurbansoltan Eje adyndaky Daşoguz Lukmançylyk Orta Okuw Mekdebi), Dashoguz
- Indira Gandhi Ashgabat Medical School (Turkmen: Indira Gandi adyndaky Aşgabat Lukmançylyk Orta Okuw Mekdebi)
- Sachly Dursunova Medical School (Turkmen: Saçly Dursunowa adyndaky Arkadag şäher Lukmançylyk Orta Hünär Okuw Mekdebi), Arkadag
- S.A. Niyazov Mary Medical School (Turkmen: S.A.Nyýazow adyndaky Mary Lukmançylyk Orta Okuw Mekdebi), Mary
- Turkmenabat Medical School (Turkmen: Türkmenabat Lukmançylyk Orta Okuw Mekdebi), Turkmenabat

=== Pedagogy ===
- Aman Kekilov Pedagogical School (Turkmen: Aman Kekilow adyndaky Mugallymçylyk Mekdebi), Ashgabat
- Beki Seytakov Pedagogical School (Turkmen: Beki Seýtäkow adyndaky Mugallymçylyk Mekdebi), Dashoguz
- Berdimuhamed Annayev Ahal Velayat Pedagogical Secondary Vocational School (Turkmen: Berdimuhamet Annaýew adyndaky Arkadag şäher Mugallymçylyk Orta Hünär Okuw Mekdebi), Arkadag
- Hydyr Deryayev Pedagogical School (Turkmen: Hydyr Derýaýew adyndaky Mugallymçylyk Mekdebi), Mary

=== Tourism ===
- Ashgabat Professional Secondary School of Tourism (Turkmen: Aşgabat Şäherindäki Syýahatçylyk Orta Hünär Okuw Mekdebi)

== Professional technical schools ==
This category of post-secondary educational institutions (Turkmen: Hünär-tehniki bilimi edaralary) offers vocational training of from one to one-and-a-half years duration in a technical specialty, and is not considered higher education. The Turkmenistan Ministry of Education publishes a list of such institutions on its website.

== Military and security institutions ==
- Great Saparmurat Turkmenbashy Military Institute (Turkmen: Türkmenistanyň Goranmak ministrliginiň Beýik Saparmyrat Türkmenbaşy adyndaky Harby instituty)
- Turkmenistan Internal Affairs Ministry Institute (Turkmen: Türkmenistanyň Içeri işler ministrliginiň instituty)
- Turkmenistan Military Academy (Turkmen: Türkmenistanyň Harby akademiýasy)
- Turkmenistan National Security Institute (Turkmen: Türkmenistanyň Milli howpsuzlyk instituty)
- Turkmenistan Naval Institute (Turkmen: Türkmenistanyň Goranmak ministrliginiň Harby-deňiz instituty), Turkmenbashy
- Turkmenistan Police Academy (Turkmen: Türkmenistanyň Prezidenti goşun generally S.A.Nyýazow adyndaky Türkmenistanyň polisiýa Akademiýasy)
- Turkmenistan State Border Service Institute (Turkmen: Türkmenistanyň Serhet instituty)

== Closed institutions ==
- International Turkmen-Turkish University (1994 — 2016)
- Turkmen State Institute of Transport and Communications (1992 — 2019)
- Branch of Gubkin Russian State University of Oil and Gas (2008 — 2012)
