= Danatar Ovezov =

Turkmen composer

Dangatar Ovezov
- Also known as: Danatar Ovezov
- Born: 1 January 1911; Mülkýusup aul, Transcaspian Oblast, Turkestan governate, Russian Empire
- Died: 5 May 1966 (aged 55); Ashkhabad, Turkmen Soviet Socialist Republic, USSR
- Genres: Classical
- Occupation(s): Composer, conductor
- Instrument: Trumpet
- Years active: 1930–1955

Dangatar Ovezov (Turkmen: Daňatar Öwezow; Russian: Дангатар Овезов; 1 January 1911 – 5 May 1966), also known as Danatar Ovezov (Turkmen: Danatar Öwezow; Russian: Данатар Овезов), was a Turkmen composer.

== Biography ==
=== Childhood and early career ===
Ovezov was born on 1 January 1911 in Mülkýusup village, Mary province. Following the death of his father, despite showing early promise as a musician, he spent his early years herding livestock for a local landowner. In 1923 he and two sisters were moved to the orphanage in Mary, where he began formal studies.

In 1925 Ovezov was sent to the Turkmen Educational College in Tashkent, where he began studying and composing music, and where he learned to play the trumpet. "Turkmen March" orchestrated for wind instruments was his first composition, completed in 1930. After graduating in 1930, Ovezov worked in various positions in Tashkent, Ashgabat, and Krasnovodsk. Ultimately he moved to Ashgabat and formed an orchestra of wind instruments at the pedagogical institute. He arranged Turkmen folk music for the orchestra, composing "Piyala", "Sen-sen", "Bibi jan", "Bady saba", and "Dash galdy".

=== Musical education and performance ===
In 1935 Ovezov wrote his first major composition, a three-part suite, "My Impressions" for wind ensemble. Between 1938 and 1940 he played in the orchestra of the Azerbaijani theater in Ashgabat, where he became acquainted with the works not only of Azerbaijani but also Russian and western European classical composers. At this point Ovezov began to dream of composing an opera, but recognized his lack of professional training.

He entered the Leningrad Conservatory in 1940, and following his studies returned to conduct the orchestra of the Opera and Ballet Theater in Ashgabat. During this period he composed numerous works, among them the first Turkmen opera Shahsenem and Gharyp, which he co-wrote with Adrian Shaposhnikov, and which was first performed on 25 October 1944. Staging of this opera drew a who's who of Turkmen theater; it was directed by Alty Garliyev, and the singers included People's Artists of Turkmenistan Maya Kuliyeva, Annagul Annaguliyeva, Sona Myradova, Hojav Annadurdyev, and Yolaman Hummayev. Ovezov and Shaposhnikov drew on Turkmen folk music for many of the melodies, including "My Loved One Has Arrived", "I Weep", "My Gharyp", and "Tyuni-Derya".

In 1946 Ovezov collaborated with Ukrainian composer Yuliy Meitus on the opera Leyli and Mejnun, the libretto of which is based on poetry by Nurmuhammed Andalyp.

In 1948 Ovezov entered the Moscow State Tchaikovsky Conservatory, and studied for three years under Professor S.A. Balasanyan. His subsequent major works included the cantata "Sounds of the Dutar" (1950), the opera "Ayna" (1960), cantatas "With Lenin's Name" (1963) and "The Communist" (1965), and the oratorio "Lenin" (1964). He also composed over 150 songs based on poetry of Kara Seytliev as well as Magtymguly Pyragy, Berdi Kerbabayev, Aman Kekilov, and others. His compositions include numerous choral works, variously accompanied by piano, by symphony orchestra, or a capella.

He received the title of People's Artist of the Turkmen SSR in 1961. He was awarded the TSSR State Prize in 1966 for "Lenin". Danatar Ovezov is considered the founder of the school of Turkmen composition.

=== Other activities ===
Ovezov was a co-founder of the Union of Composers of Turkmenistan, and chaired its board of directors from 1940 to 1948. He remained a member of the board until his death on 5 May 1966.

== Legacy ==
On 8 June 1966 the Turkmen State School of Music, the country's oldest music school, was named after him.

== Awards ==
- Order of the Badge of Honour (1950)
- Order of the Red Banner of Labour (1955)
- People's Artist of the Turkmen SSR (1961)
- Magtymguly State Prize of Turkmen SSR (1966)
