= Ministry of Oil and Mineral Resources (Turkmenistan) =

Government ministry of Turkmenistan

Ministry of Oil and Mineral Resources of Turkmenistan
- Türkmenistanyň Nebit we Gaz ministrligi

Agency overview
- Formed: 23 April 1993
- Dissolved: 15 July 2016
- Jurisdiction: oil and gas extraction and processing
- Headquarters: Archabil avenue 56, Ashgabat, Turkmenistan 744036
- Website: oilgas.gov.tm

The Ministry of Oil and Mineral Resources of Turkmenistan (Turkmen: Türkmenistanyň Nebit we Gaz ministrligi) is a former governmental agency of Turkmenistan. It was in charge of regulating activities in the oil and gas industry, petrochemical production, and transportation of hydrocarbons. The structure of this ministry included the State Agency for Management and Use of Hydrocarbon Resources under the President of Turkmenistan. Both the ministry and the state agency were abolished in July 2016.

The functions of the former ministry and state agency were divided between the deputy chairman for oil and gas of the Government of Turkmenistan and two state corporations (concerns), Turkmengaz and Türkmennebit, both of which report to the deputy chairman.

== History ==
It was established on April 23, 1993 under the name of the Ministry of Oil and Gas of Turkmenistan. In 1996, it was transformed into the Ministry of Oil and Gas Industry and Mineral Resources. It was then renamed to the Ministry of Oil and Gas on January 8, 2016. That July, it was abolished, with the distribution of functions of the ministry going to the Cabinet of Ministers.

== Ministers ==
| No. | Minister | | Term |
|---|---|---|---|
| 1 | Nazar Soýunow | April 23, 1993 | July 29, 1994 |
| 2 | Hekim Ishanov | July 29, 1994 | February 13, 1995 |
| 3 | Amangeldy Esenov | February 13, 1995 | July 1, 1996 |
| 4 | Gochmurad Nazdjanov | July 1, 1996 | April 7, 1997 |
| 5 | Batyr Sarjayev | April 7, 1997 | May 20, 1998 |
| 6 | Redzhepbay Arazov | May 20, 1998 | September 14, 2000 |
| 7 | Kurbanazar Nazarov | January 16, 2001 | November 15, 2002 |
| 8 | Täçberdi Tagyýew | November 15, 2002 | October 14, 2003 |
| 9 | Amangeldy Pudakov | January 23, 2002 | September 13, 2005 |
| 10 | Guychnazar Tachnazarov | September 13, 2005 | October 31, 2005 |
| 11 | Atamurad Berdyyev | October 31, 2005 | December 15, 2005 |
| 12 | Kurbanmurad Atayev | December 15, 2005 | July 13, 2007 |
| 13 | Baymurad Khodzhamukhamedov | July 13, 2007 | August 27, 2008 |
| - | Bayramgeldi Nedirov | August 27, 2008 | October 13, 2008 |
| 14 | Annaguly Deryayev | October 13, 2008 | October 12, 2009 |
| 15 | Oraznur Nurmuradov | October 12, 2009 | January 16, 2010 |
| 16 | Bayramgeldi Nedirov | January 16, 2010 | May 26, 2012 |
| 17 | Kakageldi Abdullaev | May 26, 2012 | January 11, 2013 |
| 18 | Muhammednur Khalilov | January 11, 2013 | January 8, 2016 |
| 19 | Muradgeldy Meredov | January 8, 2016 | July 15, 2016 |

== Subordinate organizations ==
- Turkmengaz
- Türkmennebit (Turkmenoil)
- Türkmenhimiýa
- Türkmengeologiýa
- Türkmennebitgazgurluşyk
- Turkmenbashy Oil Refinery
