= Batyr Sarjayev =

Turkmen politician

- Batyr Sarjaew

Minister of Defense of Turkmenistan
- In office May 24, 1999 – June 26, 2001
- President: Saparmyrat Nyýazow
- Preceded by: Gurbanmuhammet Kasymow
- Succeeded by: Gurbandurdy Begenchov

Ministry of Oil and Mineral Resources
- In office April 7, 1997 – May 20, 1998
- President: Saparmyrat Nyýazow
- Preceded by: Gochmurad Nazdjanov
- Succeeded by: Redzhepbay Arazov

Mayor of Ashgabat
- In office May 19, 1992 – June 3, 1993
- President: Saparmyrat Nyýazow
- Succeeded by: Yagmur Ovezov

First Secretary of the Ashgabat City Committee of the Communist Party of Turkmenistan
- In office April 23, 1990 – December 16, 1991
- Succeeded by: Post abolished

Personal details
- Born: Batyr Kurbanoviç Sarjaew; 1945 (age 80–81) Tashauz, Turkmen SSR, USSR (Daşoguz, Turkmenistan)
- Party: CPSU
- Other political affiliations: Communist Party of Turkmenistan

Batyr Kurbanovich Sarjaev (Turkmen: Batyr Kurbanoviç Sarjaew; born 1945) was a Turkmen politician and the former minister of defense of Turkmenistan.

== Early life and career ==
After graduating from high school in 1963, he began his career as a milling mechanic at the Tashauz Car Repair Plant named after the 40th Anniversary of the Turkmen SSR. From 1964 to 1967 he served in the Soviet Army. After demobilization, he entered the Turkmen Agricultural University, from which he graduated in 1973. In 1978 he joined the Communist Party of the Soviet Union

Until 1979, he worked as a railroad depot miller and master of industrial training at the Ashgabat Vocational School No. 6. From 1979 to 1980 he worked in the Ashgabat Motor Transport Association of the Ministry of Motor Transport of the Turkmen SSR, starting as a deputy head for operation and subsequently moving to the position of chief engineer.

== In the Soviet government ==
From 1980 to March 1986, he served as the head of the Transport and Communications Department of the Council of Ministers. In the following months, from March to November 1986, he held the position of Deputy Chairman of the executive committee of the Ashgabat City Council. Then, from November 1986 to November 1988, he served as the First Secretary of the Leninsky District (now Bagtyýarlyk District) Committee.

Starting from November 25, 1988, until April 1990, Sarjaev held the position of head of the Socio-Economic Department of the Communist Party. It was during this period that he encountered Saparmurat Niyazov, the future President of Turkmenistan, who was then the First Secretary of the Central Committee of the Communist Party of the Turkmen SSR, with whom he would maintain a close association.

In January 1990, Sarjaev was elected as a deputy of the Supreme Soviet of the Turkmen SSR, a position he held until May 1992. On April 23, 1990, he was chosen as the First Secretary of the Ashgabat City Committee of the Communist Party of Turkmenistan, a role he fulfilled until December 16, 1991. Additionally, he served as a member of the Politburo of the Communist Party of Turkmenistan from May 12, 1990, to August 1991.

== Turkmen government ==
=== Local councilor ===
From January 1991 to May 18, 1992, Sarjaev served as the Chairman of the Ashgabat City Council. Subsequently, from May 19, 1992, to June 3, 1993, he held the position of Hyakim (Mayor) of the City of Ashgabat. Additionally, starting from May 18, 1992, he served as a deputy of the Assembly of Turkmenistan until January 1, 1995.)

=== Government minister ===
From June 3, 1993, to May 7, 2001, Sarjaev held the position of Deputy Chairman of the Cabinet of Ministers of Turkmenistan. During this period, he had responsibilities related to various sectors, including transport and communications, law enforcement agencies, the fuel and energy complex, mechanical engineering, and other industries. While serving as deputy chairman, Sarjaev also concurrently held several other positions. He served as the Minister of the Oil and Gas Industry and Mineral Resources of Turkmenistan from April 7, 1997, to May 20, 1998, and as the Minister of Defense of Turkmenistan from May 24, 1999, to June 26, 2001. It is worth noting that Sarjaev was the first civilian in the Commonwealth of Independent States to lead a defense department. Additionally, he held several other roles during that time, including:

- Chairman of the State Commission for Emergency Situations (June 28, 1993, to December 2, 1996)
- Chairman of the State Commission for the Logistics of the Defense Complex of Turkmenistan (March 1995 to December 2, 1996)
- Deputy Chairman of the Defense and National Security Council of Turkmenistan
- Rector of the Military Institute of the Ministry of Defense (May 24, 1999, to July 9, 2001)
- Chairman of the National Olympic Committee of Turkmenistan.

From June 26, 2001, to July 29, 2002, Sarjaev served as the Head of Turkmen Railways. however, on July 29, 2002, he was dismissed from this position due to serious shortcomings in his work and was subsequently barred from holding any further leadership positions.

== Prosecution ==
On August 5, 2002, Sarjaev was arrested on various charges, including misappropriation of state property and funds. For a week, the state television channels of Turkmenistan extensively covered Sarjaev's alleged crimes.

One specific accusation against Sarjaev was related to the purchase of three diesel locomotives from Ukraine at an inflated cost. It was claimed that Sarjaev had acquired these locomotives for $1.5 million, whereas their actual price was $900,000 each. Sarjaev refuted these allegations, stating that the locomotives were purchased between 1999 and 2001, which was before he assumed the role of head of Turkmen Railways.

During an interrogation at the Prosecutor General's Office of Turkmenistan on August 23, 2002, Sarjaev suffered a severe stroke, resulting in paralysis of the right side of his face.

According to certain sources, Sarjaev was sentenced to 12 years in prison on October 12, 2002. Based on information provided by members of Sarjayev's family, in June 2004, he was transferred from the prison in Turkmenbashi city to the Owadan-depe Prison near Ashgabat.

== Later life ==
During a conference of the Office for Democratic Institutions and Human Rights of the Organization for Security and Cooperation in Europe (OSCE) in October 2011, Chary Ishaniyazov, the chairman of the opposition Republican Party of Turkmenistan, expressed concerns about the harsh conditions of detention in Turkmenistan's prisons, stating that several well-known political prisoners, including Batyr Sardzhaev.

According to an alternate account, it is believed that Batyr Sardzhaev is alive, and there were expectations of his release on October 12, 2014, which was initially planned to coincide with Turkmenistan's Independence Day, however, these expectations were not met. When Sarjayev's relatives approached the Prosecutor General's Office and the Ministry of Internal Affairs of Turkmenistan for information, they were informed that he is still serving his sentence.

== See also ==
- Government of Turkmenistan
- Ministry of Defense of Turkmenistan
