= Mary Museum =

Mary History Museum
- Mary muzeýi
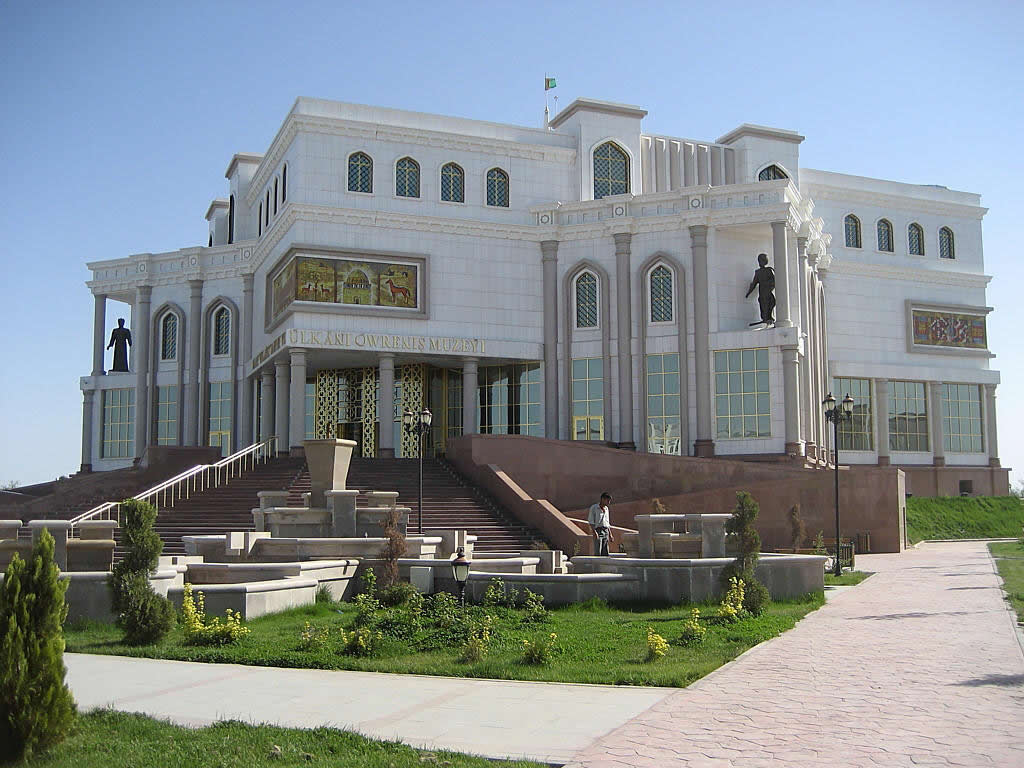
- Location: Mary, Turkmenistan
- Coordinates: 37.5852°N 61.8544°E
- Type: History

Mary History Museum is a history museum of Mary, Turkmenistan, located in the center of the city. The exposition of the museum reflects the history and culture of Mary from ancient times to the present day, is unique in size and content of the exhibits.

== History ==
The museum was founded in 1968 as Mary Historical and Revolutionary Museum. The first exhibition was opened in 1974.

The new building was built in 2010, by the Turkish construction company «Sedas Insaat», near the Gurbanguly Hajji Mosque and Mary city Library. The cost of the building - $18 million.

== Building ==
The museum is located in the large two-story building of white marble and granite color. The museum consists of the central and lateral facade and ground floor. The building has six exhibition halls, conference hall, service rooms, storage, conservation laboratories.

== Exposure ==
The museum has about forty thousand exhibits are pictures on historical themes, Oriental miniatures, tapestries, drawings, ceramics and sculptures, ancient traditional clothes, Turkmen carpets, jewelry, silverware, utensils, musical instruments, ancient weapons, ancient manuscripts, documents on the history of the region, all kinds of flora and fauna of Mary Province.

In the hall is a collection of archaeological finds, most of which are artifacts of the ancient Margu. One of the most popular exhibits is the historical museum - a casket decorated with a mosaic of ivory, dating from the second millennium BC, passed to fund the museum by Victor Sarianidi.
