= Ashgabat Botanical Garden =

Botanical garden in Turkmenistan

Coordinates: 37.953°N 58.347°E

- Interactive map of Ashgabat Botanical Garden
- Type: Botanical garden
- Location: Ashgabat, Turkmenistan

The Ashgabat Botanical Garden in Ashgabat is the oldest botanical garden in Turkmenistan. Entrance to the botanical garden is located in the eastern side of Ashgabat on the territory of the academic sciences of Turkmenistan between streets 2029 and Tagta.

Founded on 1 October 1929, Ashgabat covers approximately 18 hectares, and exhibits more than 500 different species of plants from around the world. The park is divided into several climatic zones, is decorated with sculptures and gazebos, and has greenhouses.

== Overwiew ==
In 1892, the Ashgabat Specialized Botanical Station was organized. The Garden School was then formed, which laid the foundation for the future garden.

The official founding of the Ashgabat Botanical Garden is considered to be October 1, 1929, although floristic studies on its territory were carried out long before this date. After the opening, work began on the selection and testing of flower-decorative and wood-shrub plants.

The first site, where the most decorative plants of the natural flora of Turkmenistan were collected, was laid in 1935. The responsibility of the first scientists and researchers fell to develop a garden layout, plant plantations, identify the first scientific areas, equip greenhouses.

In 1951, the garden was placed under the Academy of Sciences of the Turkmen SSR.

In August 2019, the Botanical Garden was transferred to the Turkmen Agricultural University, after which it was closed for reconstruction.

== Exposure garden ==
An extensive botanical collection has been collected in the garden, representing a wide range of world-famous species of world flora that grow in a company selected regionally on specially created sites. Here, for each plant, seeds are collected annually, and in the fall planting and sowing. The garden has more than 30 30 varieties introduced to industrial floriculture.
