= Shamuhammet Durdylyyev =

Turkmen politician

- Şamuhammet Durdylyýew

Mayor of Arkadag
- In office 28 April 2022 – 6 May 2024
- Preceded by: Position established
- Succeeded by: Gülşat Mämmedowa

Deputy Chairman of the Cabinet of Ministers for Construction and Industry
- In office February 7, 2020 – July 9, 2021
- Preceded by: Mämmethan Berdimyradowiç Çakyýew (acting)

Mayor of Ashgabat
- In office January 13, 2017 – February 7, 2020
- Preceded by: Myratnyýaz Abilow
- Succeeded by: Ýaztagan Gylyjow
- In office January 15, 2010 – January 11, 2013
- Preceded by: Azat Bilishov
- Succeeded by: Rejepgeldi Nurmammedov

Business Manager of the Cabinet of Ministers
- In office February 5, 2016 – January 13, 2017
- Preceded by: Pälwan Taganow

Deputy Chairman for Construction and Architecture, Government of Turkmenistan
- In office January 11, 2013 – January 13, 2017
- Succeeded by: Myratnyýaz Abilow

Minister of Construction
- In office April 15, 2008 – January 15, 2010

Minister of Construction and Construction Materials Industry
- In office August 9, 2007 – April 14, 2008

Personal details
- Born: 1963 (age 62–63) Bäherden, Ahal Province, Turkmen SSR, Soviet Union

Shamuhammet Durdylyyev (Turkmen: Şamuhammet Durdylyýew, Russian: Шамухаммет Дурдылыев) is a Turkmen politician. He was the first mayor of the city of Arkadag. He previously served as deputy chairman of the Turkmenistan government for construction and industry and as mayor of Ashgabat, Turkmenistan's capital city. He is currently on the board of directors of the consortium of construction companies responsible for building the "Ashgabat City" residential development.

== Biography ==
Durdylyyev was born in 1963 in Baherden, Ahal province. He graduated from the Turkmen Polytechnical Institute as a construction engineer.

He worked at Turkmen Agroindustrial Construction from 1986 to 1992. From 1992 to 1995 he ran a small business, Nusga; at the Ahal Province Gas company, and as deputy town mayor of Baherden. From 1995 to 2002 he worked at Baherden Water Utility, including as its chief. Between 2002 and 2005 Durdylyyev worked for the Ahal Rural Construction Directorate, including as deputy chief and chief.

In 2007 he was appointed deputy minister, and then minister of construction and construction materials industry of Turkmenistan. From 2008 to 2010 he served as minister of construction. From 2010 to 2013 Durdylyyev served as mayor of Ashgabat. From 2013 to 2017 he was deputy chairman of the government of Turkmenistan for construction and architecture. In 2016 he was given additional responsibility as head of administrative management of the Office of the President and the Cabinet of Ministers (business manager). On April 15, 2016, President Gurbanguly Berdimuhamedow delivered a "stern reprimand" to Durdylyyev for poor performance.

In 2017, Durdylyyev was reappointed mayor of Ashgabat and remained in that position until February 2020, when he was appointed deputy chairman of the government for construction and industry. While Durdylyyev was mayor, on May 17, 2018, President Berdimuhamedow delivered to Durdylyyev and several others a "stern reprimand". Two days earlier, central Ashgabat had been flooded and authorities had been unable to deal with the high water.

On May 22, 2020, Durdylyyev received a "stern reprimand" from President Berdimuhamedow for "weakening of control over subordinate ministries and agencies." Ostensibly the president was displeased with aspects of construction sites in Ashgabat. In November 2020, Durdylyyev was briefly hospitalized with a heart condition. On December 30, 2020, he and two other officials received "stern reprimands" due to an electrical outage that affected Ashgabat and other areas of Turkmenistan.

On February 24, 2021, President Berdimuhamedow expressed "dissatisfaction" with construction under way in Ashgabat, and listed deficiencies in need of urgent correction. He informed Durdylyyev and Ashgabat's mayor that they bear "personal responsibility" for the quality of construction works.

On 9 July 2021, President Gurbanguly Berdimuhamedow relieved Durdylyyev of his post in the Cabinet of Ministers and appointed him to the board of directors of the consortium of construction companies building the "Ashgabat City" (Turkmen: Aşgabat-Siti) residential complex. In April 2022, President Serdar Berdimuhamedow appointed him mayor (Turkmen: häkim) of the new city of Arkadag, at that time still under construction and unnamed. He was relieved of that responsibility on 6 May 2024 by presidential decree "for reasons of health".

=== Personal life ===
Durdylyyev is reportedly the brother of Gurbanguly Berdimuhamedow's wife, Ogulgerek née Durdylyýewa, making him Berdimuhamedow's brother-in-law and an uncle to current President Serdar Berdimuhamedow. He reportedly has two sons, Döwletgeldi (born 1990) and Batyrmuhammet (born 1992), and a brother, Orazdurdy (born circa 1954), who is a dentist.

== Awards ==
=== Decorations ===
- "Watana bolan söýgüsi üçin" ("For Love of the Fatherland")
- "Magtymguly Pyragy"

=== Commemorative medals ===
- "Türkmenistanyň Garaşsyzlygynyň 20 ýyllygyna" ("20 Years of Turkmenistan's Independence")
- "Garaşsyz, Baky Bitarap Türkmenistan" ("Independent, Permanently Neutral Turkmenistan")
- "Türkmenistanyň Garaşsyzlygynyş 25 ýyllygyna" ("25 Years of Turkmenistan's Independence")
