= Annasoltan Kekilova =

Soviet poet (1942–1983)

Annasoltan Seidovna Kekilova (1942 – 19 June 1983) was a Soviet-era poet and dissident from Turkmenistan. She published a number of books and songs during her career. Her poetry dealt with many of the typical subjects of Soviet writing, such as the Communist Party and the country and its people. According to her mother, three volumes of her verse were printed, and she had works published in newspapers both in the Turkmen SSR and in Moscow.

Born in the Keshi neighborhood of Ashgabat, Kekilova was the daughter of Ogulsakhat Seidova, and had one son. She was related to the writers Aman and Shali Kekilov.

In the winter and spring of 1971 Kekilova wrote to the 24th Congress of the Communist Party of the Soviet Union and to the Central Committee of the Communist Party of the Soviet Union complaining about conditions in the Turkmen SSR; her report was 56 pages long, and was accompanied by an illustrated album. Among its contents was a demand that the women of Turkmenistan be granted more rights. The party refused to act upon her complaints, ordering her latest volume of verse to be stopped before publication, and she was forced to leave her job despite the fact that she was the only support for her mother and son. She went to Moscow in search of assistance, but found none; she contacted the British Embassy for asylum, but received no response there, either. Frustrated, she renounced her Soviet citizenship and prepared to begin the process of emigration.

On 26 August 1971 an ambulance pulled up to her home in Keshi and she was forcibly removed to a psychiatric hospital. Her mother petitioned for her to be let out, a request which was leaked to the Western press. It was to no avail; Kekilova refused to recant her report, and she died in the clinic at the age of 41 after forcible medical treatment, observers near the end of her life claiming that she looked thirty years older than her actual age.

She continued to write while in custody, passing manuscripts to her mother and sister as they visited; her sister then sent them to Moscow, but the letters disappeared en route. Later much of her work was destroyed in a house fire. Some which survived was published in 2015, as part of a collection of the work of writers from Turkmenistan.
