= Esenmyrat Orazgeldiýew =

Turkmenistani politician (born 1966)

Esenmyrat Orazgeldiýew (born 1966) is a Turkmen agricultural specialist and politician, currently serving as deputy chairman for agriculture of the government of Turkmenistan.

== Biography ==
Orazgeldiýew graduated from the Turkmen Agricultural University in 1991 as a mechanical engineer. From 1991 to 2004, he worked at that university as vice chair and chair of the youth organisation, a senior instructor in operating agricultural machinery, and as prorector for student affairs. In October 2004 he was appointed rector of the university.

In December 2005, Orazgeldiýew was appointed deputy minister of agriculture of Turkmenistan, and in January 2006 was appointed minister. He concurrently chaired the Turkmen Grain Products Association (Turkmen: Türkmengallaönümleri). Orazgeldiýew replaced Begenc Atamyradov, whom President Saparmyrat Nyýazow fired for "grave shortcomings" in his performance. Niyazov said, "We are making big investments in the agrarian sector, which amount to billions of [dollars], but there is no sign of efficiency."

In March 2010, Orazgeldiýew was appointed rector of the newly opened agricultural institute in Daşoguz, and in July 2011 was appointed as the governor of Daşoguz Region. In July 2015, he was appointed deputy chairman of the government for agriculture, but in April 2016 was reassigned as the governor of Ahal Region. In that capacity, Orazgeldiýew attended the 70th Session of the United Nations General Assembly in November 2015 as part of the official delegation of Turkmenistan.

In April 2017, he returned to the Cabinet of Ministers for a second term as deputy chairman for agriculture. On 3 February 2021, Berdimuhamedov issued to Orazgeldiýew a "stern reprimand with final warning" for "grave shortcomings" in his performance.

== Awards ==
- Watana bolan söygüsi üçin ('For Love of the Fatherland')
