= Gözel Nuralyýewa =

Turkmen politician and journalist (born 1954)

Minister of Culture and Information of Turkmenistan
- In office 14 November 2003 – 11 August 2004
- President: Saparmyrat Nyýazow

Personal details
- Born: Gözel Myradowna Nuralyýewa; 25 November 1954 (age 71) Homaý, Boldumsaz District, Daşoguz Province, Turkmen SSR, Soviet Union
- Education: Turkmen State University
- Profession: Teacher

Gözel Myradowna Nuralyýewa (born 1954) is a Turkmen politician and journalist.

== Biography ==
Gözel Myradowna Nuralyýewa was born in 1954 in the village of Homaý of the Boldumsaz District of the Daşoguz Province.

Nuralyýewa graduated from the Turkmen State University, majoring in Russian language and literature. She began her career in 1977 as a teacher at secondary school No.5 of Dänew District.

Taking various positions in the mass media of the Turkmen SSR and Turkmenistan in the 1980s and 1990s. From 1981 to 1986, she worked as a correspondent, head of the department of the newspaper Tashauzskaya Pravda. In 1986–1988, she worked as a instructor of the Daşoguz city committee of the Communist Party of the USSR. From 1988 to 1990 she was a student of the Leningrad Higher Party School. In 1990–1991, she was in charge of the sector of the Central Committee of the Communist Party.

From 1991 to 1992, worked as a leading specialist of the State Printing Committee.

In 1995, she joined the state TV and Radio Corporation of Turkmenistan; later that year she became deputy editor, and later editor-in-chief, of the national newspaper Neytralny Turkmenistan.

In 2003, she was appointed minister of culture and information, at the same time becoming deputy chairman of the Cabinet of Ministers. 11 August 2004 dismissed for health reasons.

== Awards ==
- Medal "Watana bolan söýgüsi üçin" (1996, Turkmenistan)
- Medal "Gaýrat"
- Jubilee Medal "20 Years of Independence of Turkmenistan"
