= Myratgeldi Akmämmedow =

Turkmen politician (born 1951)

Myratgeldi Akmämmedow (born 1951) is a Turkmen politician.

== Early life ==
Myratgeldi Akmämmedow was born in the village of Rahat of the Mary Region in 1951. In 1969, he was inducted as a primary school teacher in a local school. In 1970, he joined the Turkmen Polytechnic Institute.

== Career ==
Upon graduation as a construction-engineer in 1976, Akmämmedow joined the Ashgabat division of the Ministry of Amelioration and Water Management as an inspector. In 1984, after successive promotions, he was appointed as the deputy head of Saryniyaz PMK-20. Beginning 1985, he worked as chief engineer of Hauzhan PMK-36 for some time, before going on to head the PMK-18 of Glavkarakumstroy department.

=== Politics ===
In 1990, he was nominated as Deputy Chairman of the Executive Committee to the Deputy Governor of the Oguzhan District. Akmämmedow would serve as the Head of Construction Department of the Ministry of Automobile Transportation and Roads from 1995 to 2003, before being transferred to the Department of Industry, Construction and Mechanization of the Ministry of Water Economy, in the same role.

In 2005, he was appointed as the first Deputy Minister of Water Resources. On 20 February 2007, Akmämmedow was decreed in as the Minister of Water Economy for a six-month probation period replacing Tekebay Altayev. He held on to the post until 22 July 2008, when he was chosen to be one of the nine Vice Presidents. (Note: He was replaced by Annageldi Yazmyradov.) His primary role was to oversee the agrarian sector — develop an agro-industrial complex, open training institutes etc. Akmämmedow served till September 2011, when he was dismissed from service on account of inefficiency. (Note: Replaced by Mammetniyaz Nurmammedov.)

From 2015 to 2017, he served as the Minister of Oil and Gas. (Note: Akmämmedow had replaced Muhammetnur Khalylov. He was replaced by Myratgeldy Meredov.)
