= Annaguly Deryayev =

Annaguly Deryayev (born 1973) is a Turkmen politician and the head of the state oil company Türkmennebit. He was minister of oil and gas industry and mineral resources from 2008 to 2009.

He was born in the village of Ekerem of Esenguly District of Balkan Province in 1973. He graduated from the Turkmen Polytechnic Institute in 1994 as mining engineer.

After graduation, he worked as drill operator in test wells in Goturdep and also served in the Turkmen army from 1997 to 1998. In 1998–2002, he was an engineer for drilling technologies at the Burnebitgas trust of Türkmennebit, and from 2002 head of the Türkmennebit's department. After that, he was the first deputy chairman of the company. From October 2008 until October 2009 he served as minister of oil and gas industry and mineral resources of Turkmenistan. In October 2009, he was demoted from the ministerial position. Since October 2010 he has been serving as head of the state oil company Tukmenneft.
