= Muhamentnur Halylov =

Oil and Gas Minister in the Turkmenistan Cabinet of Ministers

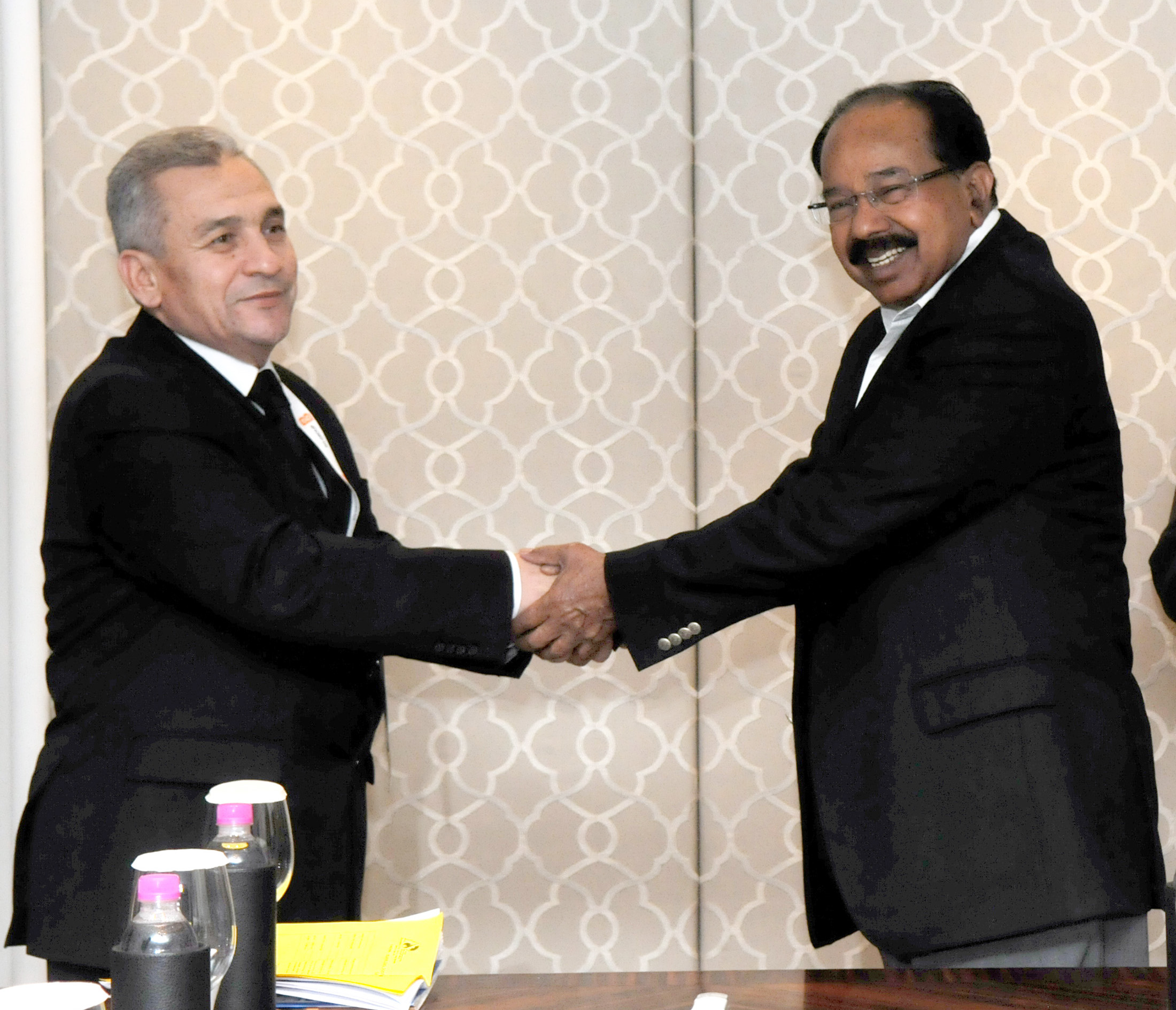
Halylov (left) meeting Veerappa Moily in 2013

Muhammetnur Halylov is Oil and Gas Minister in the Turkmenistan Cabinet of Ministers.
