= Mayor of Ashgabat =

The mayor of Ashgabat (Turkmen: Häkim Aşgabat) is the head and the highest-ranking official of Ashgabat, Turkmenistan, who leads the Government of Ashgabat, the main executive body of the city.

== Role ==
With the adoption of the current Constitution of Turkmenistan on May 18, 1992, the structure of local government was reformed for all towns and regions in Turkmenistan. Article 80 of the constitution specified the role of häkim (mayor, lit. 'governor') as the holder of executive power for towns, replacing the previously used council system and its position of chairman. As a result, Batyr Sarjayev, the Chairman of the Ashgabat City Council at the time of adoption, became the first Mayor of Ashgabat. As Ashgabat is both a city and a region of Turkmenistan, the mayor is also called the Governor of Ashgabat.

== List of mayors ==
The following is a list of mayors of Ashgabat, the capital of Turkmenistan.

No.	Name	Start of term	End of term	Refs.
1	Batyr Sarjayev	May 19, 1992	June 3, 1993	
2	Yagmur Ovezov	June 3, 1993	February 13, 1995	
3	Nury Orazmukhammedov	February 13, 1995	November 22, 1996	
4	Kakajan Tashliyev	November 22, 1996	July 7, 1997	
5	Ashirberdy Cherkezov	July 7, 1997	August 21, 2001	
6	Berdymurad Rejepov	August 21, 2001	July 29, 2002	
7	Amangeldy Rejepov	July 29, 2002	July 8, 2005	
8	Orazmurad Esenov	July 8, 2005	May 21, 2007	
9	Deryageldi Orazov	May 21, 2007	August 15, 2008	
10	Azat Bilishov	August 15, 2008	January 15, 2010	
11	Shamuhammet Durdylyyev	January 15, 2010	January 11, 2013	
12	Rejepgeldi Nurmammedov	January 11, 2013	August 14, 2015	
13	Myratniyaz Abilov	August 14, 2015	January 13, 2017	
14	Shamuhammet Durdylyyev	January 13, 2017	February 7, 2020	
15	Yaztagan Gylyjov	February 7, 2020	July 9, 2021	
16	Rahym Gandymov	July 9, 2021	—	
