= Ministry of Culture (Turkmenistan) =

Government ministry of Turkmenistan

The Ministry of Culture of Turkmenistan
- Türkmenistanyň medeniýet ministrligi

Ministry overview
- Formed: 17 October 2011; 14 years ago
- Headquarters: Ashgabat, Turkmenistan
- Minister responsible: Atagely Shamuradov, Minister of Culture

The Ministry of Culture of Turkmenistan (Turkmen: Türkmenistanyň medeniýet ministrligi) is a governmental body of Turkmenistan. Its mission is to formulate and implement state cultural policies supporting professional and amateur art, theatre, music, fine arts, cinema, museums, libraries, and written publications, to guard copyright and copyright-related interests, and to protect cultural values.

== Ministers ==
No	Name	Start	End
1	Ashyrgeldy Mamiliyev	1991	26.06.1992
2	Geldimurad Nurmuhammedov	26.06.1992	02.08.1995
3	Soltan Pirmuhammedov	02.08.1995	23.02.1996
4	Orazgeldi Aydogdiyev	02.05.1996	14.11.2003
5	Gozel Nuraliyewa	14.11.2003	11.08.2004
6	Maral Byashimova	11.08.2004	27.04.2006
7	Enebay Atayeva	27.04.2006	08.06.2007
8	Kakageldi Charydurdiyev	08.06.2007	11.01.2008
9	Gulmyrat Myradov	11.01.2008	17.02.2012
10	Guncha Mammedova	18.02.2012	04.04.2012
11	Annageldi Garajayev	04.04.2014	24.02.2017
13	Gulshan Orazmuhammedova	25.02.2017	15.05.2017
14	Atageldi Shamyradov	15.05.2017	Present

== Subordinate Organizations ==
- Turkmen State Circus
- State Academy of Arts of Turkmenistan
