= Mary, Turkmenistan =

Capital of Mary Province, Turkmenistan

Mary Mary şäheri
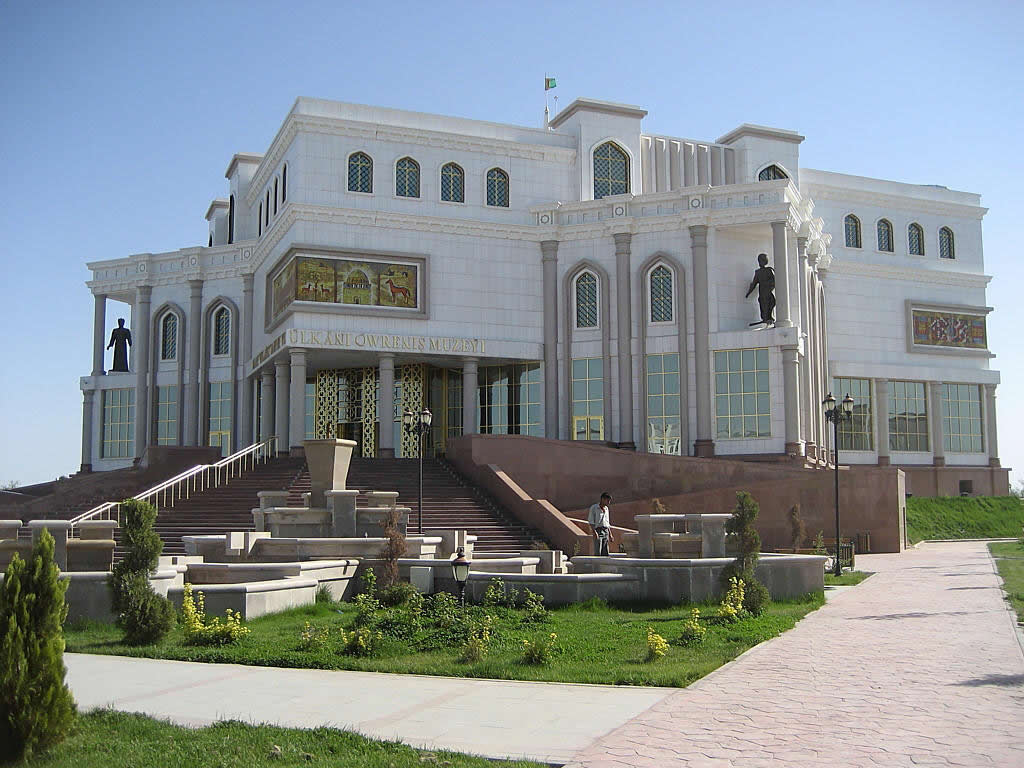
- Regional Museum in Mary

- Location in Turkmenistan
- Coordinates: 37°36′24.8″N 61°50′3.9″E
- Country: Turkmenistan
- Region: Mary
- Founded: 1884

Government
  - Hakim: Kakageldi Gurbanov
- Elevation: 223 m (732 ft)

Population (2022 official census)
  - Total: 167 027
  - Estimate (2024): 208,697
- Time zone: UTC+5
- Postal code: 745400

Mary (Turkmen pronunciation: [mɑˈɾɯ]) is a city on an oasis in the Karakum Desert in Turkmenistan, located on the Murgab River. It was founded in 1884 about 30 kilometres (19 mi) from the ruins of the ancient abandoned great city of Merv and was actually named Merv until 1937.

Mary is the capital city of Mary Region. In 2022, Mary had a population of 167,027, up from 92,000 in the 1989 census.

== Etymology ==
Atanyýazow notes that the name "Muru" appears in Zoroastrian texts alongside the toponyms Sogd (Sogdia) and Bakhti (Bactria), and that the name "Margiana" appears carved into rocks at Behistun, Iran, dating back 2,500 years. Atanyyazow adds, "the name was used in the form Merv-ash-Shahizhan", with subsequent forms including Muru, Mouru, Margiana, Marg, Margush, Maru, Maru-shahu-jahan, Maru-Shahu-ezan, Merv, and Mary, and that some scholars interpret the word marg as "green field" or "grassland", noting that in Persian marg can mean a source of livestock.

== History ==
The ancient city of Merv was an oasis city on the Silk Road. It was destroyed and its population annihilated in the 13th century by the Mongols. Because of its location on the Silk Road, it revived over time only to be largely destroyed again in the 19th century by nomadic Teke raiders. Edmund O'Donovan described Merv in 1882 as

... only a "geographical expression". It means a certain amount of cultivated territory where half a million Tekke-Turkomans manage to eke out an existence by pastoral pursuits, plunder, and thievery, combined with the caravan service between Bokhara and Meshed. There is no central point which you can call Merv now, if I except the place which has grown into existence since my arrival. I speak of Koushid Khan Kala, a fort at a point on the river Murghab ...

Mary was founded in 1884 as a Russian military and administrative post (and named after the nearby ancient city of Merv) after Imperial Russia occupied the area earlier that same year, which triggered the Panjdeh incident between Afghanistan, British forces, and the Imperial Russian Army.

In August 1918, a force of the British Indian Army consisting of a machine gun detachment comprising 40 Punjabi troops and a British officer resisted the Bolsheviks near Mary (then Merv) in what was the first direct confrontation between British and Russian troops since the Crimean War.

Later, the Soviet Union developed the area around Mary as a center for cotton production through the use of extensive irrigation. The Great Soviet Encyclopedia article on Mary reads in part,

Mary (until 1937 Merv), city, center of Mary Oblast of Turkmen SSR. Located on the Murghab River and Karakum Canal. Junction of railroad lines to Tashkent, Krasnovodsk, and Kushka. 67 thousand residents (1973; 8.5 thousand in 1897, 37 thousand in 1939, 48 thousand in 1959). Large wool degreasing plant, cotton gin, machine building factories; building construction amalgamate; food (milling, baking, and meat packing amalgamates, dairy plant, etc.), leather industry, carpet production. Near to Mary began to operate in 1973 the Mary District State Electrical Power Plant. Medical and pedagogical colleges. Museum of history of the revolution. Drama theater.

In 1968, huge reserves of natural gas were discovered 20 kilometers west of the city in the Shatlyk Gas Field.

Mary became the center of Mary Province on 18 May 1992, after the collapse of the Soviet Union and the Turkmen proclamation of independence.

In the 2000s, many streets and new residential areas were built. The new airport terminal was constructed, as was a new building for the Turkmen State Power Engineering Institute, a theater, the new library, a new historical museum, the Palace of Spirituality (Turkmen: Ruhiýet Köşgi), the Margush Hotel, a medical diagnostic center, the Ene Mähri obstetric-pediatric medical center, the Gurbanguly Hajji Mosque, a stadium, an equestrian complex, an indoor swimming pool, and a new railway station.

In 2012, the city was declared one of the cultural capitals of the CIS.

== Climate ==
Mary has a hot arid climate (Köppen BWh) with sweltering summers, cool winters and very low humidity throughout the year. Precipitation is very low, and what there is mostly occurs in late winter and early spring.

Climate data for Mary
Month	Jan	Feb	Mar	Apr	May	Jun	Jul	Aug	Sep	Oct	Nov	Dec	Year
Mean daily maximum °C (°F)	11 (52)	12 (54)	19 (66)	26 (79)	33 (91)	38 (100)	40 (104)	37 (99)	32 (90)	24 (75)	15 (59)	11 (52)	25 (77)
Daily mean °C (°F)	5.7 (42.3)	7.5 (45.5)	14 (57)	20.1 (68.2)	26.9 (80.4)	31.6 (88.9)	33.3 (91.9)	30.2 (86.4)	24.9 (76.8)	17 (63)	10.3 (50.5)	6 (43)	19.0 (66.2)
Mean daily minimum °C (°F)	2 (36)	3 (37)	9 (48)	15 (59)	21 (70)	26 (79)	27 (81)	24 (75)	19 (66)	12 (54)	6 (43)	2 (36)	14 (57)
Average precipitation mm (inches)	17.6 (0.69)	36.7 (1.44)	35.0 (1.38)	24.4 (0.96)	10.4 (0.41)	0.8 (0.03)	0.2 (0.01)	0.1 (0.00)	0.3 (0.01)	9.5 (0.37)	16.8 (0.66)	10.0 (0.39)	161.8 (6.35)
Average snowfall cm (inches)	1.2 (0.5)	1.5 (0.6)	0.5 (0.2)	0 (0)	0 (0)	0 (0)	0 (0)	0 (0)	0 (0)	0 (0)	0.5 (0.2)	1.8 (0.7)	5.5 (2.2)
Average precipitation days	7.2	6.9	8.1	6.2	3.7	0.4	0.1	0.1	1.4	2.6	3.6	6.8	47.1
Average relative humidity (%)	52.9	51.9	41.9	31.8	22.7	15.7	15.2	15.9	20.2	28	42.1	49.9	32.4
Average dew point °C (°F)	−1.6 (29.1)	−0.5 (31.1)	3.7 (38.7)	8.6 (47.5)	9.1 (48.4)	8.9 (48.0)	9.3 (48.7)	7.4 (45.3)	5.6 (42.1)	3.9 (39.0)	2.1 (35.8)	0.4 (32.7)	4.7 (40.5)
Mean daily daylight hours	10.4	11.3	12.4	12.4	14.7	15.2	15	14	12.8	11.6	10.6	10.1	12.5
Percentage possible sunshine	43.8	45.9	46.7	54.8	69.5	82	84.5	85.7	82.8	72.1	60.6	44.5	64.4
Average ultraviolet index	3	3	5	6	7	8	8	7	6	4	3	2	5
Source 1: World Weather Online (Temperatures–Precipitation–Snow–Humidity-UV) (2009–present)
Source 2: Weatherbase (Sunshine–Dew point–Precipitation days)

== Administrative context ==
The city of Mary is the capital of Mary Region. Mary is a city of district-level importance, meaning that it is not part of any district, and is administratively directly subordinate to the region. However, there also is Mary District which surrounds the city. The administrative center of the district is also the city of Mary, despite not being part of it.

The city of Mary includes the town of Saparmyrat Türkmenbaşy, and the villages of Mülkburkaz, Soltanyz, and Ýolly.

== Economy ==
Mary is Turkmenistan's fourth-largest city and a large industrial center for the natural gas and cotton industries, two of the nation's major export earners. It is a trade center for cotton, cereals, hides, and wool.

== Transportation ==
Mary is linked to Aşgabat, Tejen and neighbouring countries by the country's 600 km motorway network.

== Culture ==
=== Library ===
Mary's library is the largest regional library in the Mary District. Construction of the library began in February 2010. The library officially opened on October 20, 2011 and the President of Turkmenistan, Gurbanguly Berdimuhamedow, held the official opening ceremony.

The building has a spherical shape, and is supported by 62 columns. The height of the library is 42 meters. The three-story building is designed for the storage of three million books, and can manage 600 concurrent readers. The library's collection includes a book shop, nine reading rooms, internet facilities, a separate reading room for elders, an office of special departments, conference rooms, and a children's room. Under the dome of the library, which is in the form of tulip petals, is a telescope.

=== Other ===
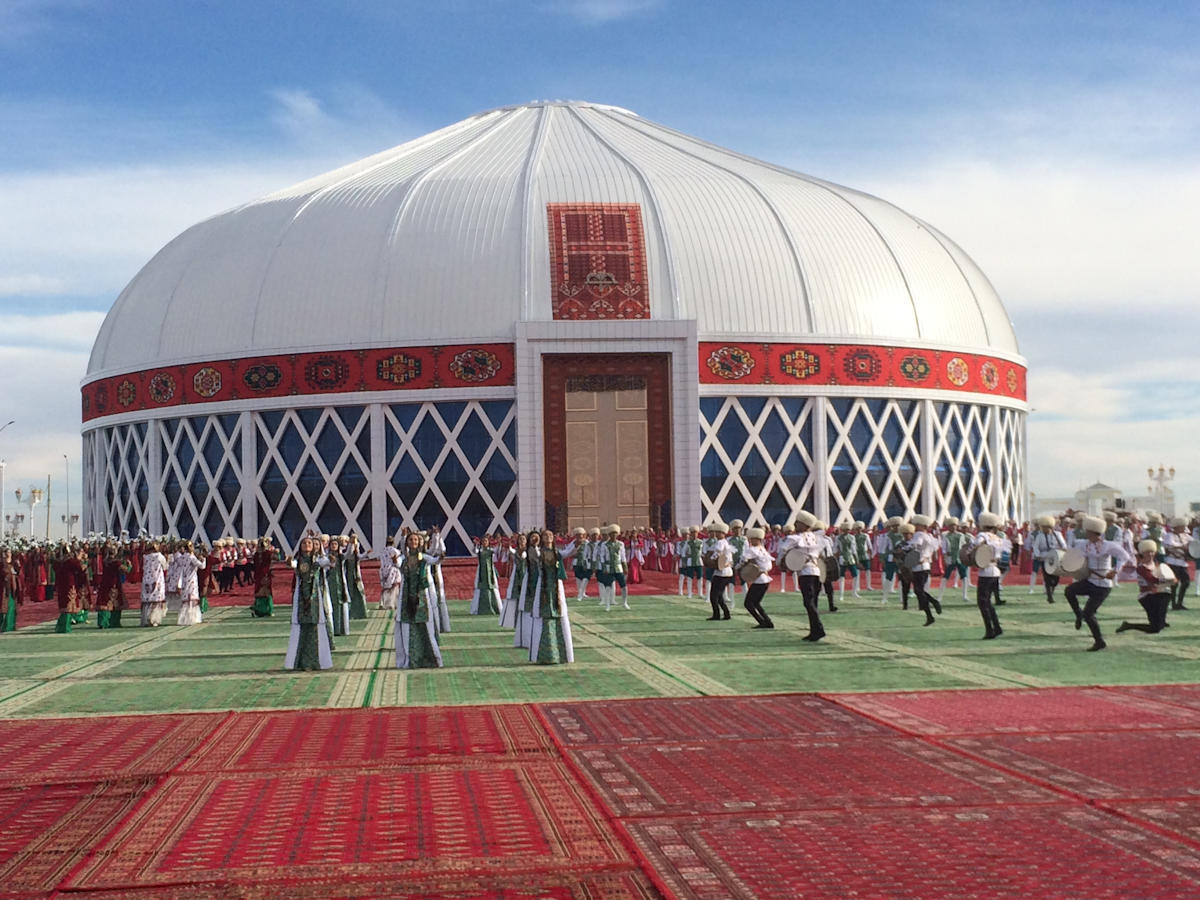
An immovable three-storey artificial yurt built in 2015 for large events.

Mary is known for its regional museum.

The main football team is Merw FK, who play at Mary Sport Toplumy.

Turkmen Keraites believe, according to a Nestorian tradition, that Tomb of the Virgin Mary is located in Mary.

== Notable people ==
- Akmammedov Myratgeldy, Turkmen politician
- Khadyr Saparlyev, Turkmen politician
- Yelena Bonner, Soviet/Russian human rights activist
- Eduard Asadov, Soviet/Russian poet and writer
- Elen Shakirova, Olympic gold medalist in handball
- Nazar Petrosyan, former football player and coach
- Mekan Nasyrov, former football player

== Gallery ==
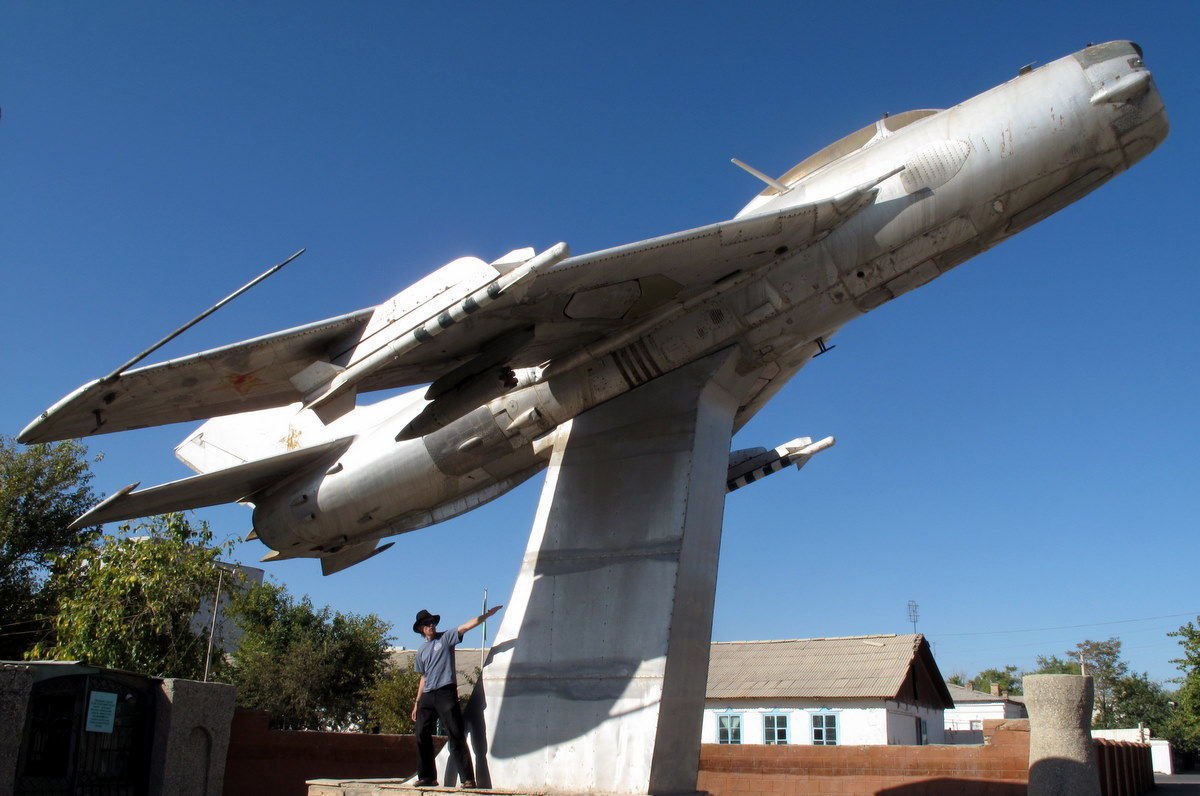
MiG monument in Mary

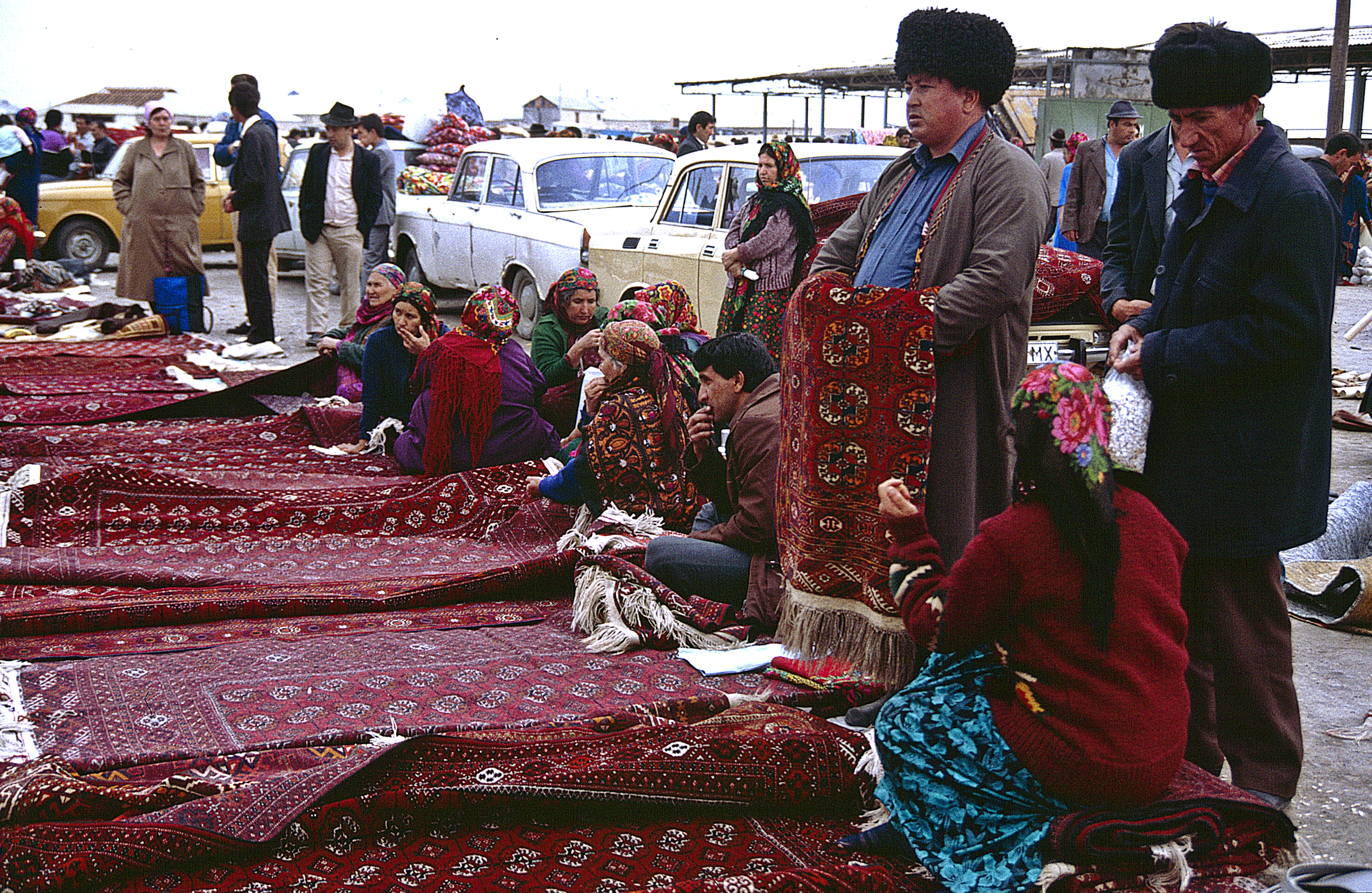
Market in Mary, 1992

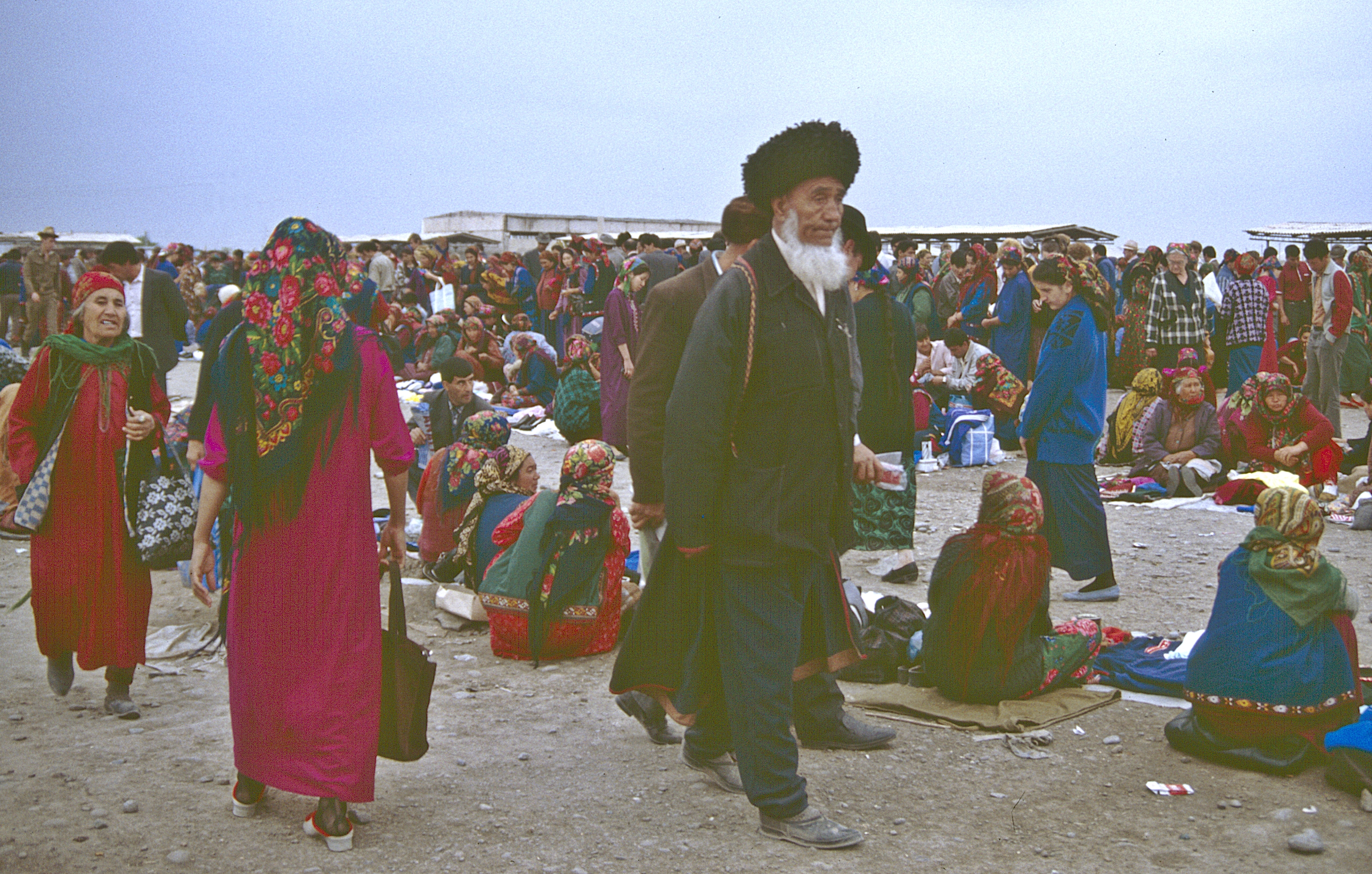
Market in Mary, 1992

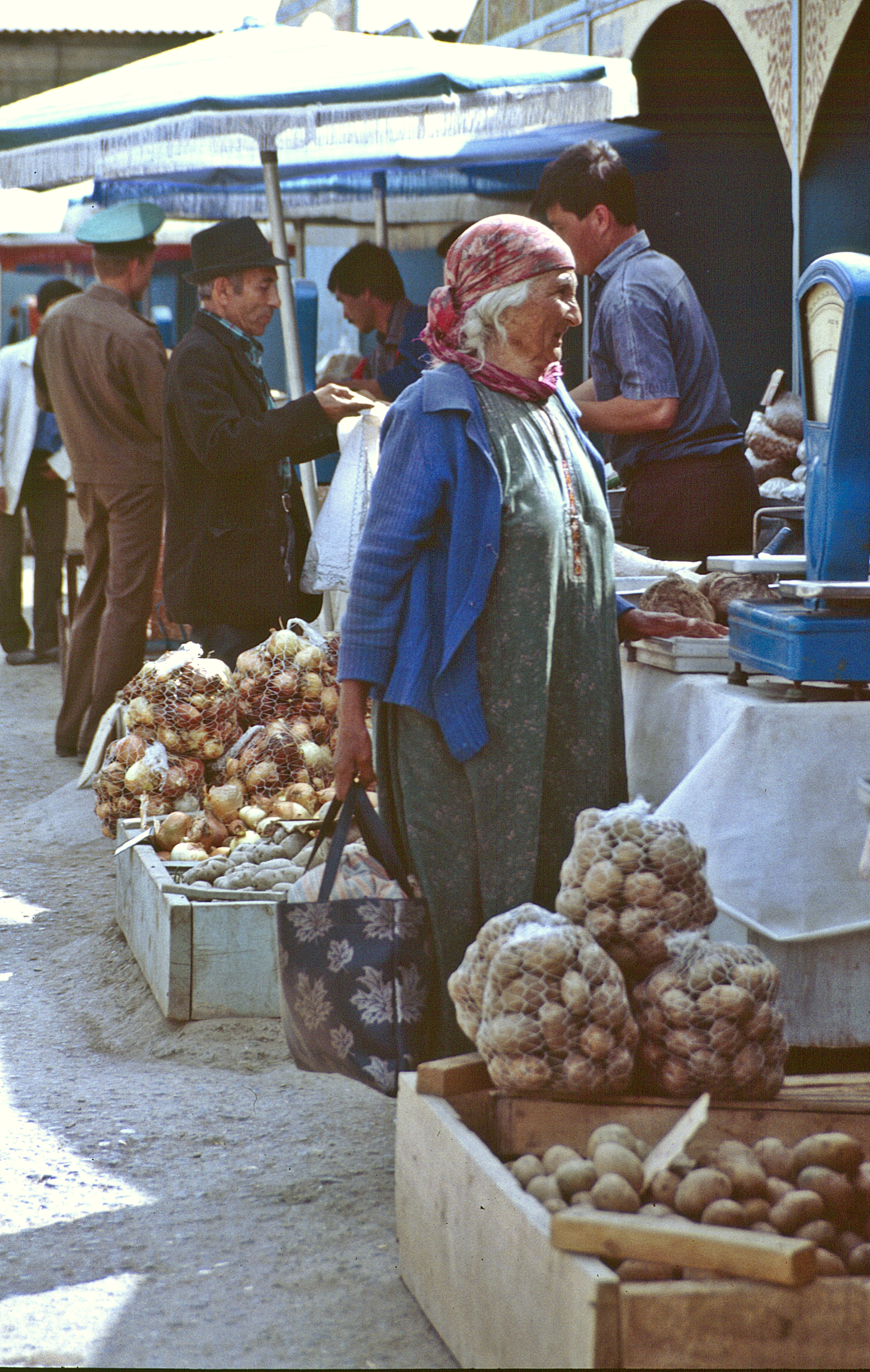
Market in Mary, 1992

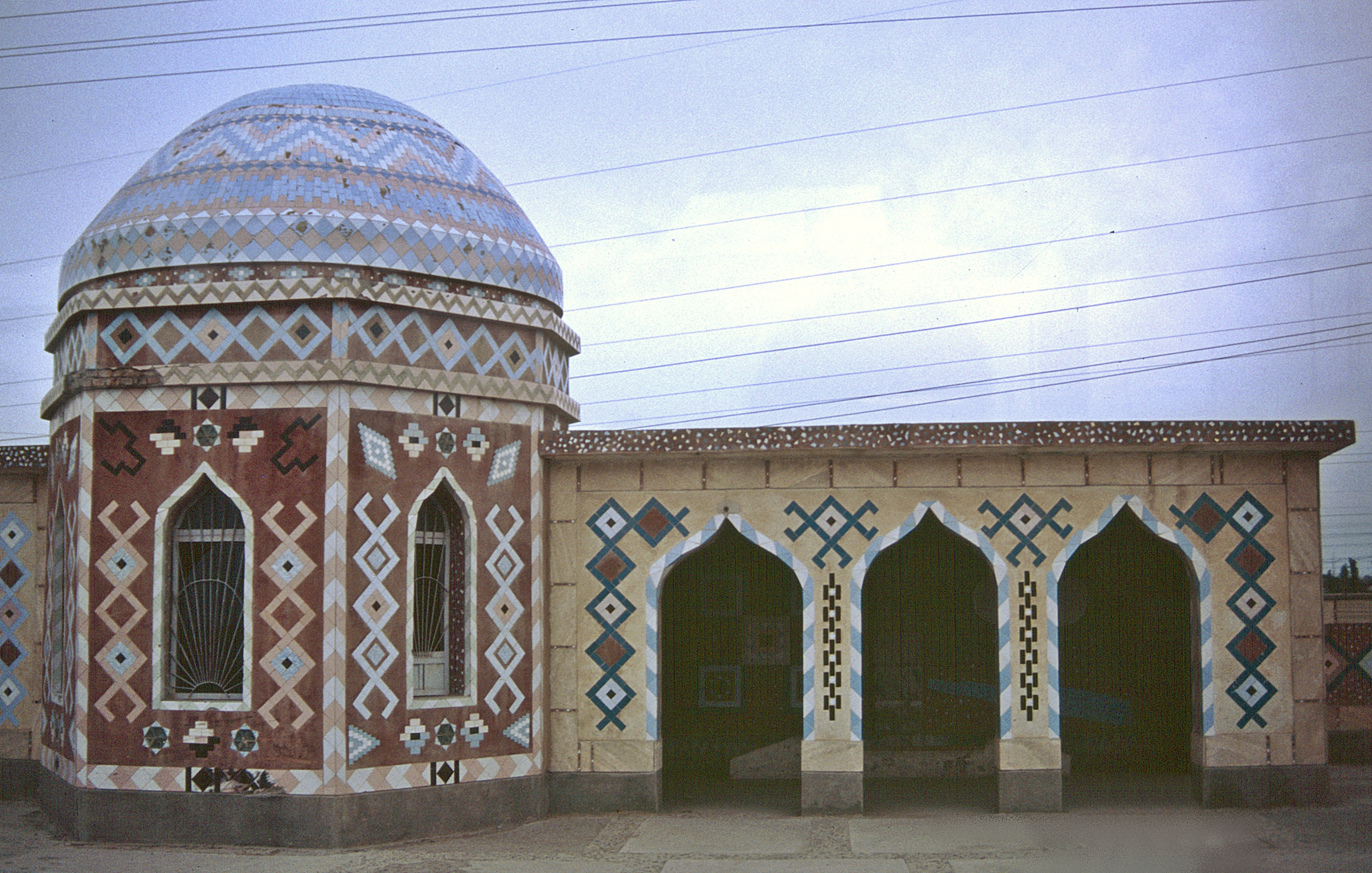
Bus stop,1992

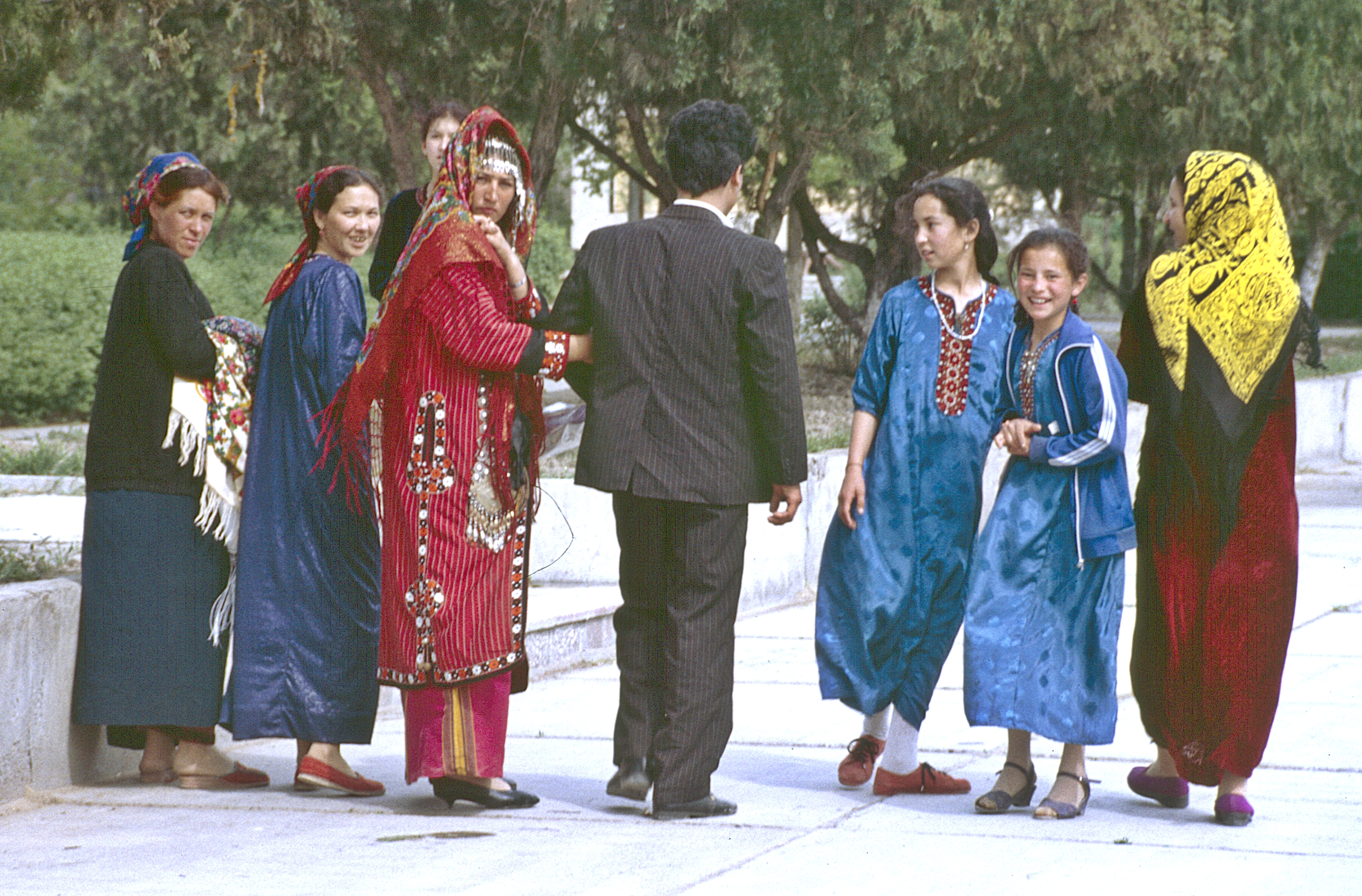
Wedding in Mary, 1992

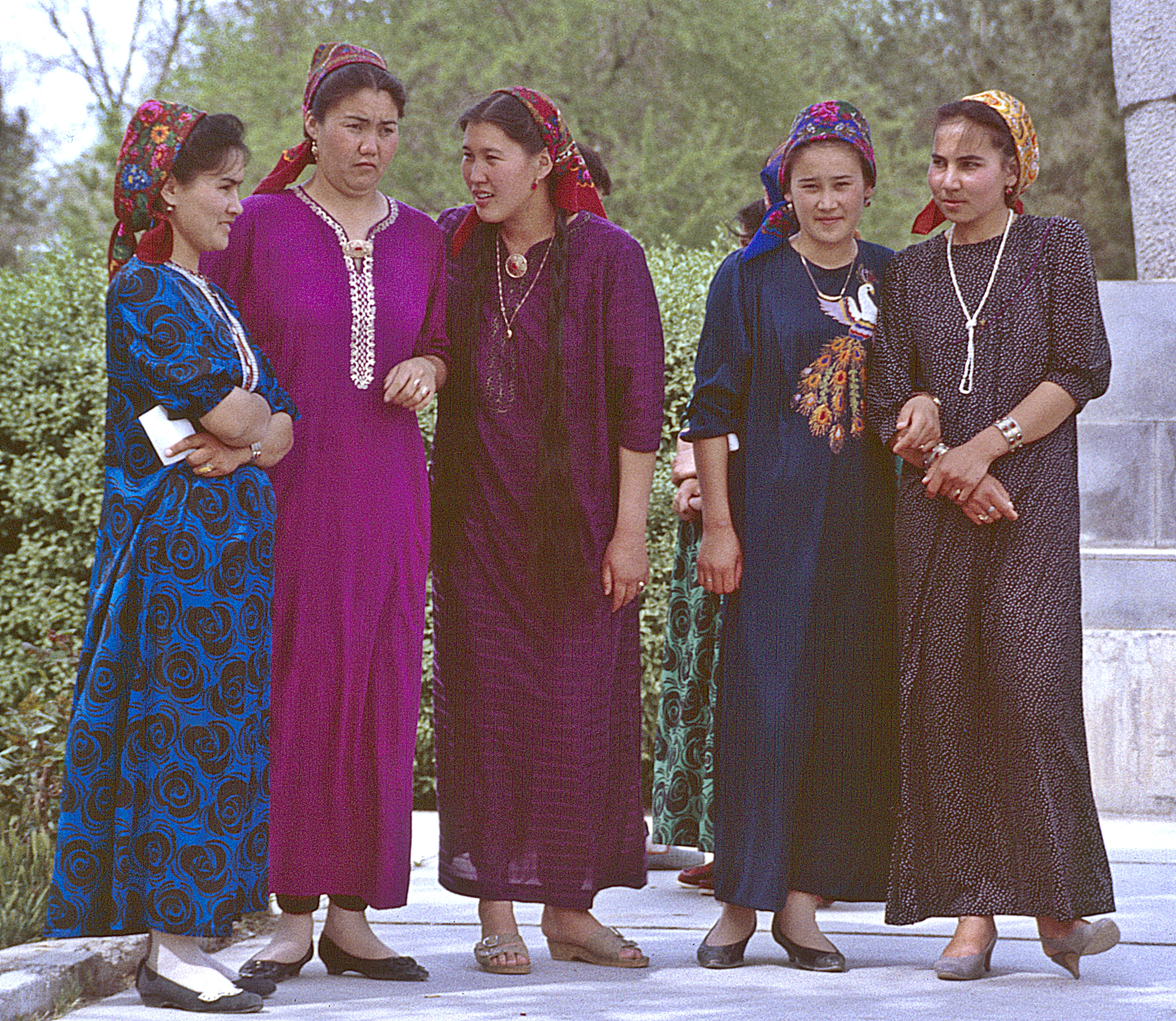
Women in Mary, 1992

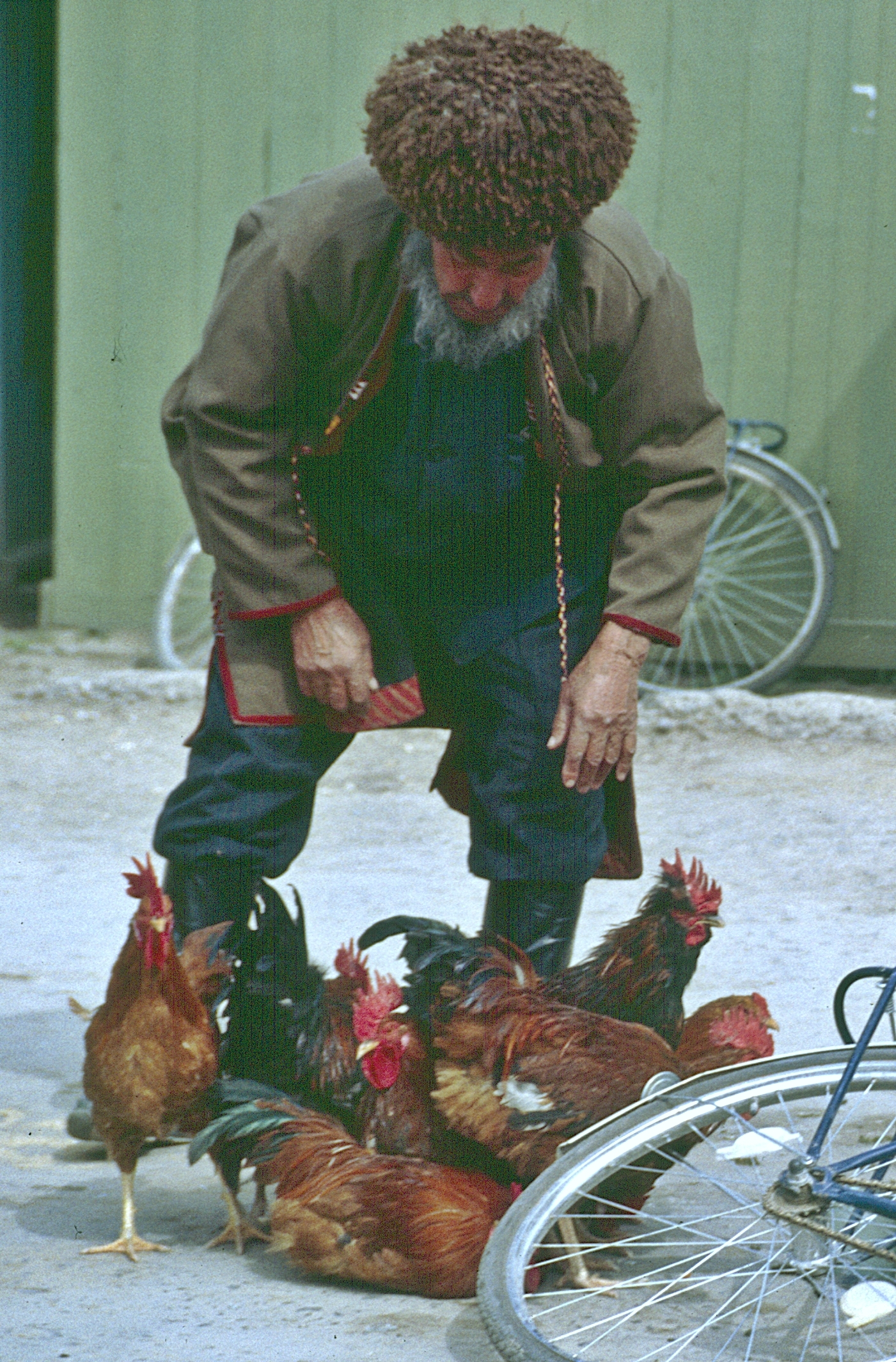
Market in Mary, 1992

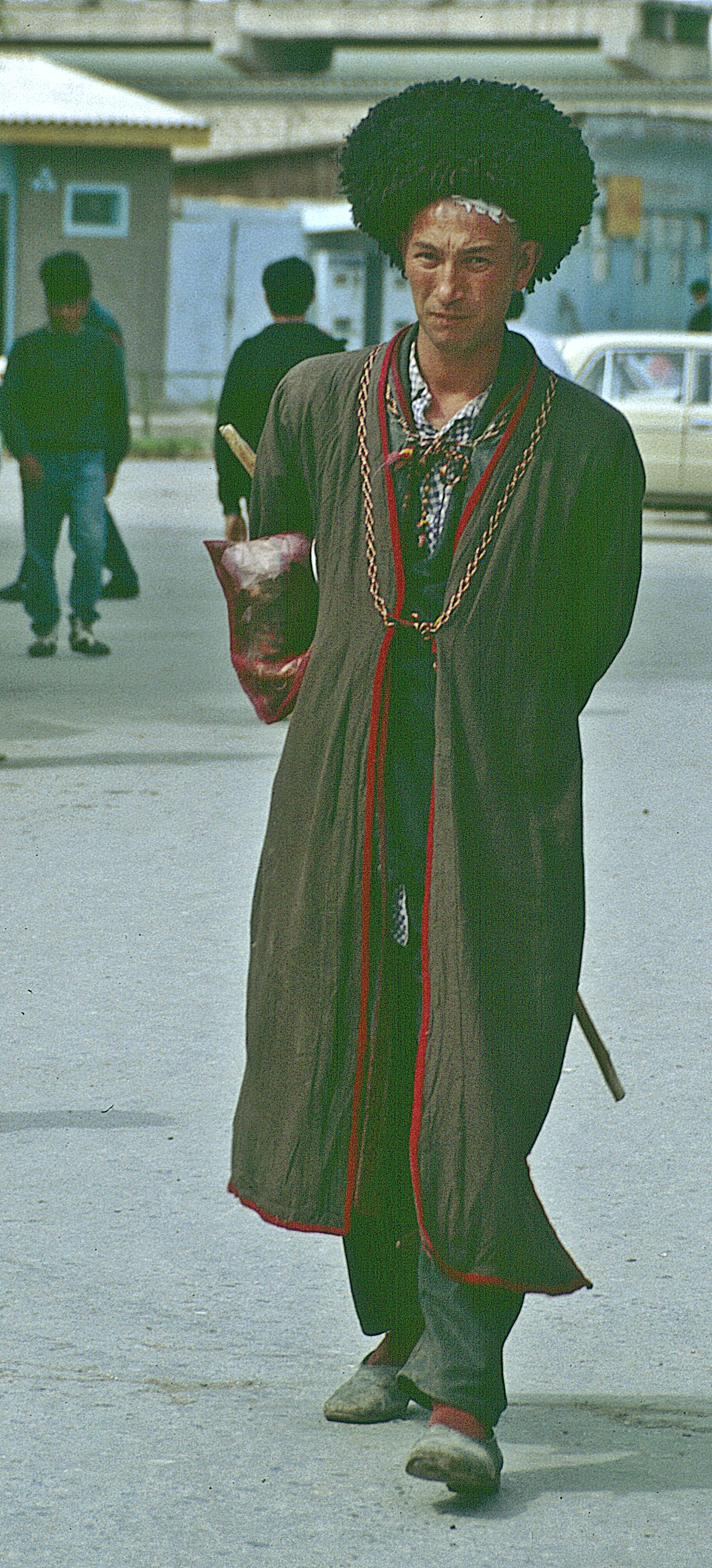
Man in Mary wearing a traditional telpek hat, 1992

Mosque in Mary

== International relations ==
=== Twin towns – Sister cities ===
Mary is twinned with:

- Jeddah, Saudi Arabia
- Samarkand, Uzbekistan
- Oryol, Russia
- Xi'an, China
