= Oguzhan University of Engineering Technologies =

Turkmen technology university

Coordinates: 37°57′40″N 58°19′37″E

Oguzhan Engineering and Technology University of Turkmenistan
- Type: University
- Established: 2016
- Rector: Gurbanmyrat Mezilov
- Location: Ashgabat, Turkmenistan

Oguzhan Engineering and Technology University of Turkmenistan (Turkmen: Türkmenistanyň Oguz han adyndaky Inžener-tehnologiýalar uniwersiteti) is a university located in Ashgabat, Turkmenistan. It was established in 2016.

== History ==
Oguzhan Engineering and Technology University of Turkmenistan was established as a joint Turkmen–Japanese project in science and education. It is the 19th civilian higher education institution in Turkmenistan. It partially uses premises of the former International Turkmen-Turkish University in the Köşi neighborhood of Ashgabat, and is located on Taslama köçesi.

== Faculties ==
- Chemistry and nanotechnology
- Biotechnology and ecology
- Computer science and information technology
- Cyberphysical systems
- Economics of innovations

== Majors ==
- Materials science and technology of new materials
- Nanomaterials
- Chemical technology
- Chemical engineering
- Biotechnology
- Ecology and nature management
- Genetics and bioengineering
- Cell and molecular biology
- Microbiology
- Information systems and technology
- Informatics and computer engineering
- Mobile and network engineering
- Animation and graphic design
- Digital infrastructure and cybersecurity
- Digital economy
- Applied mathematics and informatics
- Automation and control
- Electronics and nanoelectronics
- Mechatronics and robotics
- Biomedical electronics
- Physics for modern technology
- Innovatics
- Innovation economics
- Human resource management
- Technology entrepreneurship
- Philology (technical English and Japanese)
