= Gurbanguly Hajji Mosque =

Mosque in Mary, Turkmenistan

Religion
- Affiliation: Islam
- Ecclesiastical or organisational status: Active

Location
- Location: Mary, Turkmenistan
- Interactive map of Gurbanguly Hajji Mosque

Architecture
- Architects: Kakajan Durdyev and Durli Durdyev
- Type: Mosque
- Style: Islamic
- Completed: 2009

Specifications
- Capacity: 2,500
- Dome: 1
- Dome height (outer): 24 m
- Minaret: 4
- Minaret height: 63 m
- Materials: marble

The Gurbanguly Hajji Mosque (Turkmen: Gurbanguly Hajy metjidi) is a mosque in Mary, Turkmenistan. It was completed in 2009, during the rule of Gurbanguly Berdimuhamedov. It is a prominent landmark in Mary with its four minarets.

== History ==
Mosque with original blue dome and surrounding gardens

The project developed in 2001 Ashgabat architects Kakajan and Durly Durdyev.

The mosque was protracted because of lack of funds.

In 2007, at the meeting held in Mary People's Council of Turkmenistan residents of Mary province twas asked to the President of Turkmenistan assist in the construction of the mosque. Gurbanguly Berdimuhamedov said the decision to allocate for this purpose one million dollars from the charity fund of President of Turkmenistan.

Turkish company "Kilic Insaat" finish construction of the mosque.

Opened in spring 2009, and is named for the wishes of those who believe in honor of the President of Turkmenistan Gurbanguly Berdimuhamedov. At the opening of the President of Turkmenistan attend in person, in honor of the opening of the mosque was given a ceremonial dinner sadaqah.

After the improvement works were carried out in 2018, the mosque appeared in an updated form: the dome is painted in gold color.

== Architecture ==
The white marble mosque with golden domes and four slender minarets is one of the attractions of Mary. The building was built in the best traditions of Turkmen architecture. The diameter of the main dome with a mosaic ornament, crowned with a golden crescent, is 24 m (79 ft) meters. The height of each of the minarets is 63 m (207 ft) meters. The prayer hall is designed for the simultaneous participation in the prayer of 2,500 people. The upper tier is for women. Eight columns hold the dome with a span of 24 m (79 ft) meters.

The interior is decorated with noble materials: marble, granite and precious woods. A special place in the decoration of the mosque is occupied by embossed epigraphy containing Surahs of the Koran and traditional Islamic calligraphy. They also adorn its white marble facades.

The tall domes are faced with majolica and crowned with gilded crescents. In the evening, the mosque is illuminated with the original color illumination of the building.

The complex includes a special building for a sadaqah, a building for ritual ceremonies, a hotel and other necessary buildings. Cascades of fountains adorn the central staircase of the mosque.

== See also ==
- Islam in Turkmenistan
- Islamic architecture
- List of mosques
- Türkmenbaşy Ruhy Mosque
