= Hydyr Saparlyev =

Turkmen politician (born 1958)

Hydyr Saparlyev (Turkmen: Hydyr Muhammetberdiýewiç Saparlyýew), born 1958, is a Turkmen politician. He was one of the deputy chairman of the Cabinet of Ministers of Turkmenistan. In 1982, he graduated from the Turkmen Polytechnic Institute in engineering and obtained a master's degree in technical sciences. In 2004, he was appointed minister of education of Turkmenistan and as of October 2005, ambassador of Turkmenistan to Armenia. In February 2007, he was re-appointed minister of education of Turkmenistan. On 16 March 2007 he was appointed deputy chairman of the Cabinet of Ministers for education, science, health, culture, sports, and mass media. He held that position until 11 February 2011.
