= International Oil and Gas University =

University in Ashgabat, the main university of the Turkmenistan oil and gas community

Coordinates: 37.8943°N 58.3158°E

Yagshygeldi Kakayev International Oil and Gas University Halkara nebit we gaz uniwersitety
- Type: State
- Established: 2012
- Rector: Atamanov Bayrammyrat Yaylymovich
- Address: 744036, Turkmenistan, Ashgabat, Archabil avenue, 8 , Ashgabat, Turkmenistan
- Website: https://iogu.edu.tm/en

Yagshygeldi Kakayev International Oil and Gas University (Turkmen: Ýagşygeldi Kakaýew adyndaky Halkara nebit we gaz uniwersiteti) is a university located in Ashgabat, the main university of the Turkmenistan oil and gas community. It was founded on May 25, 2012 as the Turkmen State Institute of Oil and Gas. On August 10, 2013, it became an international university. A branch of the University operate in Balkanabat.

== History ==
Created in order to improve existing work on the diversification of exports to the world market of Turkmen minerals, the implementation of high-quality level of development programs of oil and gas industry. The decree № PP-6081 was signed by President of Turkmenistan on the establishment of the Turkmen State Institute of Oil and Gas. Was placed under the supervision to the Ministry of Education of Turkmenistan.

August 10, 2013 "in order to radically improve the training of highly qualified specialists for the oil and gas industry" was renamed the International University of Oil and Gas.

On February 12, 2019, by the Resolution of the Assembly of Turkmenistan, the International University of Oil and Gas was named after the political and public figure Yagshygeldi Kakayev.

As of June 2022, the school’s rector and administrative leader is Atamanov Bayrammyrat Yaylymovich.

== Education ==
The institute created about twenty specialties in eight areas: geology, exploration and mining, chemical engineering, computer technology, construction, architecture, manufacturing machinery and equipment, energy, economics and management in industry, management.

The institute seven faculties and 27 departments. Taught by some 250 teachers, including 6 doctors, including 5 professors and 33 candidates of sciences, including 14 professors.

== Faculties ==
- Geology
- Exploration and development of mineral resources
- Сhemical Engineering
- Computer Technology
- Engineering and Architecture
- Technological machinery and equipment
- Energy
- Economics and management in the industry
- Management

== Сampus ==
The building was built in the southern part of Ashgabat, where a new business and cultural center of the capital of Turkmenistan. 17-storey office building was built by Turkish company «Renaissance». The project started in 2010. The opening ceremony of the buildings took place September 1, 2012 with the participation of President of Turkmenistan Gurbanguly Berdimuhamedow.

The building is symbolically resembles an oil rig. The complex of buildings of the University covers an area of 30 hectares, consists of a main 18-storey building and five academic buildings, 86 classrooms at the same time be able to learn to 3,000 students. The institute located assembly and meeting rooms, museum, archive, library (with 250 seats) equipped with multimedia equipment reading rooms, Center for Information Technology, cafe, clinic, grocery and department store. Classrooms and laboratories equipped with modern equipment.

The university has a museum, where the archive is created fund, telling about the oil and gas production, oil and gas development and the national economy of Turkmenistan.

The building in 2012, recognized as the best building of the CIS according to the International Union of Architects Association of CIS.

=== Dormitories ===
6 dormitories constructed for each faculty, designed for 230 seats. Rooms - double the terms, kitchen room is equipped with household appliances.

=== Sport complex ===
Operates an indoor sports complex, with a boxing ring, gym and swimming pool. The multi-purpose sports hall has fields for football, basketball, volleyball, tennis and other sports. Separately located gymnasium. There are showers. On the sports field with natural grass flooring classes are held in the open air.
