= International Turkmen-Turkish University =

University in Ashgabat, Turkmenistan

Coordinates: 37°57′19″N 58°19′45″E

International Turkmen-Turkish University Halkara Türkmen-Türk uniwersiteti Uluslararası Türkmen-Türk Üniversitesi
- Type: University
- Active: 1994–2016
- Location: Ashgabat, Turkmenistan

International Turkmen-Turkish University (Turkmen: Halkara Türkmen-Türk uniwersiteti; Turkish: Uluslararası Türkmen-Türk Üniversitesi; abbreviated as ITTU) was a university located in Ashgabat, Turkmenistan. The university was established in 1994 and closed in 2016, superseded by the Oguzhan University of Engineering Technologies.

== History ==
The university was established in 1994 in close cooperation with Turkey. On 30 May 2013, a groundbreaking ceremony was held for the new building complex of the Oguzhan University of Engineering Technologies, attended by President Gurbanguly Berdimuhamedov of Turkmenistan and President Abdullah Gul of Turkey. The new campus was constructed in the Köşi neighborhood of Ashgabat with design capacity of 3,500 students.

== Colleges ==
- Pedagogical
- Engineering
- International Business
- Language Center

== Sports ==
In 2003, the university formed a football club known as HTTU Aşgabat, based at HTTU Stadium. Initially composed only of students, it soon became a professional organization. It later competed as Ýedigen FC and has won three Ýokary Liga titles.
