= Türkmennebit =

Turkmen national oil company

- Type: State-owned
- Industry: Oil
- Predecessor: Balkanneftegazprom (Nebitdag)
- Founded: 1 July 1996
- Headquarters: Ashgabat, Turkmenistan
- Key people: Agajanov Guvanch Velinazarovich (Chairman)
- Products: Petroleum, petrol, and related
- Website: turkmennebit.gov.tm

Türkmennebit (alternatively spelled Turkmennebit), also known by the translation of the name as Turkmenoil (in English) or Turkmenneft (in Russian; Туркменнебит), is the national oil company of Turkmenistan. It was established by a presidential decree reorganising parts of the former Ministry of Oil and Gas in July 1996, and has its headquarters in Ashgabat. The chairman of the company is Guychgeldi Baygeldiyev. The main oil fields operated by Türkmennebit are Goturdepe, Barsa-gelmez, Nebitdag, Körpeje, Gamyşlyja, Çeleken and Kemer, mainly in Balkan Province near the Caspian Sea.

In May 2017, Türkmennebit drilled the first well at the Uzynada field, reaching 7,150 meters and it produced 500,000 cubic meters of gas and 200 tonnes of condensate per day.

On 5 April 2022, by Decree of the President of Turkmenistan, Agajanov Guvanch Velinazarovich was appointed as the Chairman of Türkmennebit.

In July 2022, Türkmennebit renewed the Production Sharing Agreement with Dubai’s Dragon Oil Company which was to end in 2025, and now extends until 1 May 2035.

Türkmennebit signed a Memorandum of Understanding (MoU) with Dragon Oil Company for three new offshore oil field within Block 19 in January 2024.

In 2024, a total of 533 wells were repaired by Türkmennebit’s Nebitgazdüýpliabatlaýyş Trust which produced an additional 194.5 million cubic meters and 278.3 thousand tons of oil which also came from wells belonging to the Goturdepe Well Capital Repair department, the Gamishlija management and the Barsagelmez capital repair department.

In February 2025, Türkmennebit commissioned a new well at the Uzynada field. The well, no. 85, has a depth of 6,830 meters and a daily output of 75,000 cubic meters of natural gas and 70 tonnes of condensate.

On 14 May 2025, Turkmenistan State Enterprise Hazarnebit, a subsidiary of Türkmennebit, signed a production sharing contract with partners PETRONAS and XRG for a 5% stake in Block I offshore gas and condensate field. The block produces 400 million cubic feet of natural gas per day. Oil production in Turkmenistan was to exceed 8 million tonnes in 2025, the previous years oil production was 8.2 million tons.

== Methane emissions ==
In May 2023 the Guardian published a report, blaming Turkmenistan in general and Turkmenoil in particular to be the worst in the world for methane emitting. The greenhouse gas was emitted in large amounts from flare stacks that had been extinguished and from a few pipeline leaks. Researchers suspected continuous flaring had been stopped to prevent conflicts with Turkmenistans laws and replaced by venting, which is also illegal, but much harder to detect. The data collected by Kayrros researchers indicate that two large fossil fuel fields leaked 2.6m and 1.8m tonnes of methane in 2022 alone, pumping the CO_{2} equivalent of 366m tonnes into the atmosphere, surpassing the annual CO_{2} emissions of the United Kingdom for 2022.

== See also ==
- Türkmengaz

== Links ==
- Official website
