= Täçberdi Tagyýew =

Täçberdi Tagyýew, anglicized as Tachberdy Tagyyev, is a Turkmen politician, born in 1955 in Etrek District, Balkan Province. He was deputy chairman for oil and gas of the Cabinet of Ministers of Turkmenistan from 2007 to 2009.

In 1977 he graduated from the Turkmen Polytechnic Institute in engineering in drilling and exploitation in oil and gas deposits. From November 2002 to October 2003 he was Minister of Oil and Gas Industry and Mineral Resources of Turkmenistan and in 2003 was appointed governor (Turkmen: häkim) of Balkan Province.

In 2006 he was appointed general director of the Turkmenbashy Oil Refinery Complex. In February 2007 was appointed chairman of the Turkmengas State Concern with rank of minister of state. In 2007, he was appointed deputy chairman of the Cabinet of Ministers of Turkmenistan for Oil and Gas and was removed from this post on 13 July 2009 as a result of slow growth in his sector. From 2009 to 2012 he headed the Seýdi Oil Refinery. In 2012 Tagyýew was reappointed general director of the Turkmenbashy Oil Refinery Complex but was fired from that position in October 2014 for "serious shortcomings" in his work. Opposition media noted that Tagyýew received "stern reprimands" in each of his official positions.
