= State Academy of Arts of Turkmenistan =

Coordinates: 37°56′23″N 58°22′24″E

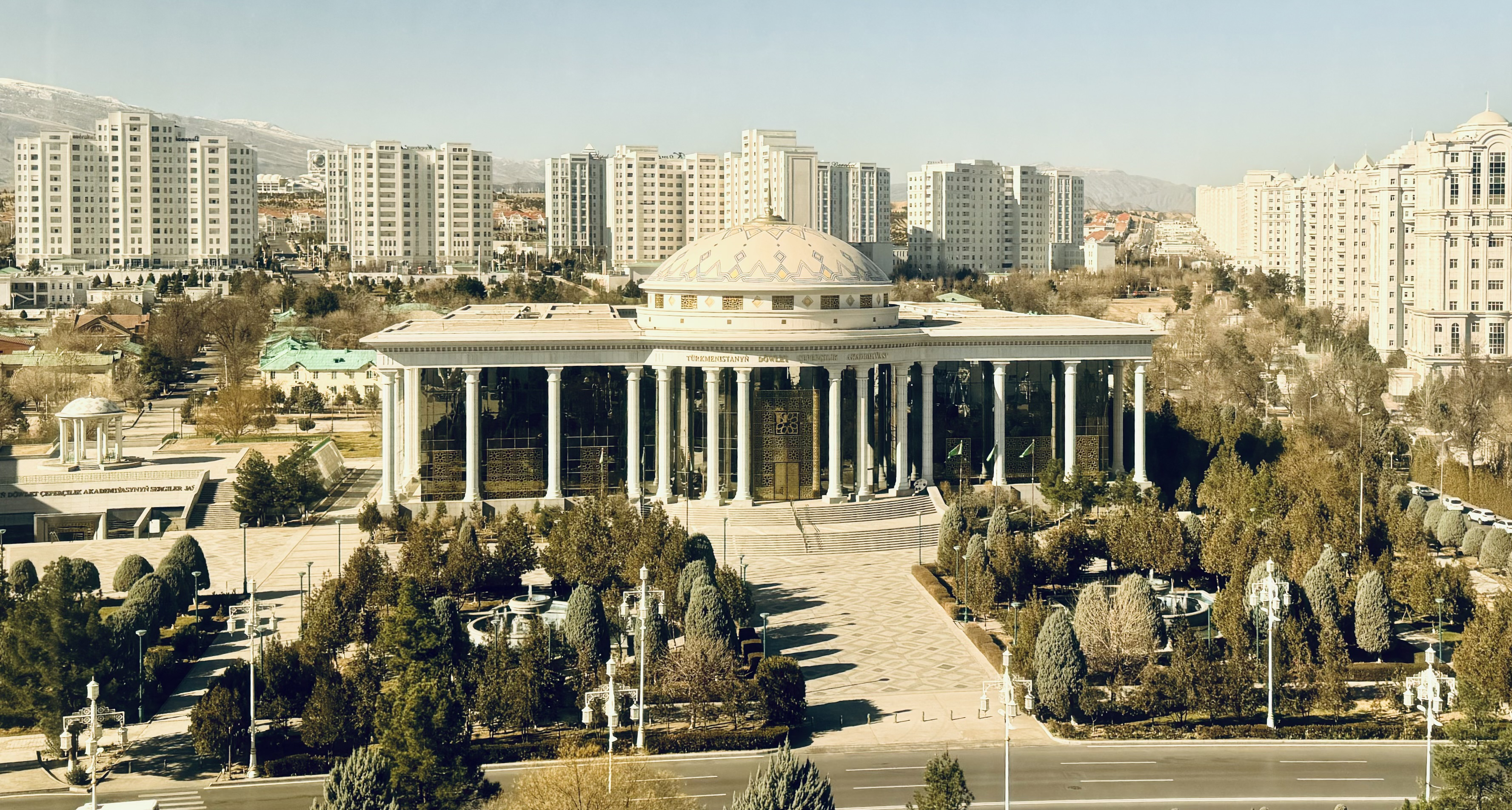

The State Academy of arts of Turkmenistan (Türkmenistanyň Döwlet çeperçilik akademiýasy) in Ashgabat, was founded in 1994 by President of Turkmenistan Saparmurat Niyazov. It is subordinate to the Ministry of Culture of Turkmenistan.

The new building was opened on February 1, 2006 in Alisher Navoi Street, near the Museum of Fine Arts of Turkmenistan. The President of Turkmenistan, Saparmurat Niyazov, took part in the opening ceremony. The cost of the buildings built by the French company "Bouygues" was $40 million.

The current rector of the Academy is Ahatmyrat Nuvvaev.
