= Yagshygeldi Kakayev =

Turkmen politician and energy executive (1959–2020)

- Ýagşygeldi Kakaýew

Deputy Chairman of the Cabinet of Ministers
- In office 6 November 2015 – 5 April 2017
- Preceded by: Baymurat Hojamuhammedov
- Succeeded by: Maksat Babayev
- In office 28 May 2012 – 8 June 2013
- Preceded by: Baymurat Hojamuhammedov
- Succeeded by: Baymurat Hojamuhammedov
- In office 24 July 2010 – 8 September 2010; Acting

Personal details
- Born: Yagshygeldi Ilyasovich Kakayev; 1959 Görogly District, Turkmen SSR, USSR (now Turkmenistan)
- Died: 8 July 2020 (aged 61) Ashgabat, Turkmenistan
- Education: Turkmen Polytechnic Institute

Yagshygeldi Ilyasovich Kakayev (Turkmen: Ýagşygeldi Ilýasowiç Kakaýew; Russian: Ягшигельды Эльясович Какаев, romanized: Yagshigel'dy El'yasovich Kakayev; 1959–8 July 2020) was a Turkmen politician and energy executive. He was one of the Deputy Chairmen of the Cabinet of Ministers of Turkmenistan from 2012 to 2013 and from 2015 to 2017. In 2010, he served as acting deputy chairman. His career in government was primarily focused on oil and gas matters. From 2007 to 2016, he was the Director of the State Agency for Management of Hydrocarbons.

== Biography ==
He was born in Görogly District, Dashoguz province in 1959, and in 1982 he graduated from the Turkmen Polytechnic Institute with a concentration in oil and gas exploration and mechanization. In his early career, he worked with the All-Russian Research Institute for Gas and later became head of the institute's department of oil and gas.

From 2007 to 2008, he was the chairman of Türkmengaz, the state owned natural gas company. In 2010, he took over the role of Deputy Chairman of the Cabinet of Ministers on an acting basis from Baymurat Hojamuhammedov, who had been dismissed by President Gurbanguly Berdimuhamedow for "unsatisfactory performance".

In 2012, Kakayev was appointed director of the (now defunct) State Agency for Management and Utilization of Hydrocarbon Resources.

Kakayev served twice more as the deputy chairman on a full-time basis. In 2017, he was dismissed by the president from this post because of weak control over the implementation of the country's oil and gas strategy.

From 22 December 2017 until his death, he was an advisor to the President of Turkmenistan for oil and gas affairs. In February 2020 he was given a "stern reprimand with final warning" for allegedly poor performance.

Kakayev reportedly died from pneumonia on 8 July 2020. He had also reportedly suffered from diabetes. One opposition media source stated, however, that Kakayev died of COVID-19.

== Legacy ==
On 12 February 2021, the Turkmen Mejlis (parliament) decreed, at the request of President Berdimuhamedow, that the International Oil and Gas University be named in honor of Kakayev.
