= Aman Kekilov =

Aman Kekilov (Turkmen: Aman Kekilow, Аман Кекилов; Keshi village, current Ahal Province, 9 May 1912 – 13 December 1974) was a Soviet Turkmen poet. Among his relations was the writer and dissident Annasoltan Kekilova.
