= Turkmen State Institute of Architecture and Construction =

Higher education institution in Ashgabat, Turkmenistan

Coordinates: 37.9241°N 58.4280°E

- Türkmen döwlet binagärlik-gurluşyk instituty
- Former name: Turkmen Polytechnic Institute
- Established: 1963
- Location: Baba Annanow köçesiniň 136-njy jaýy Ashgabat 744025, Turkmenistan
- Campus: Urban
- Website: https://tdbgi.edu.tm/

The Turkmen State Institute of Architecture and Construction (Turkmen: Türkmen döwlet binagärlik-gurluşyk instituty, formerly called Turkmen Polytechnic Institute) is a major university in Turkmenistan. It is the leading educational institution in Turkmenistan for engineering and energy. A number of noted Turkmen politicians studied at the university, particularly in the economic sector, including Annaguly Deryayev, Hojamyrat Geldimyradov, Yagshygeldi Kakayev, Hydyr Saparlyyev and Täçberdi Tagyýew.

== History ==
The institute was established on 25 May 2012 to expand higher education opportunities in engineering and architecture.

On 1 September 2026, coinciding with Knowledge and Student Youth Day, inaugurated a brand-new campus complex designed to meet international standards for higher education.

== Campus and Infrastructure ==
The university campus spans an area of 32.2 hectares (79.5 acres) in Ashgabat. Designed to accommodate 5,000 students, the complex includes:

- A 13-storey main administrative building;
- Academic blocks housing 8 faculties and 28 departments;
- Specialized research laboratories, including an earthquake-resistant construction laboratory featuring dynamic platforms (such as the Motion Systems PS-6TM-550) for seismic simulation;
- A modern digital library and a conference hall;
- On-campus student dormitories providing 2,600 beds;
- A residential complex consisting of two buildings (80 apartments total) for faculty and staff;
- Indoor and outdoor athletic facilities, dining halls, and auxiliary services.

== See also ==
- List of universities in Turkmenistan
