= Turkmen Agricultural University =

Higher education institution in Turkmenistan

Coordinates: 37.9525479°N 58.34239125°E

- Türkmen oba hojalyk Uniwersitety (Turkmen)
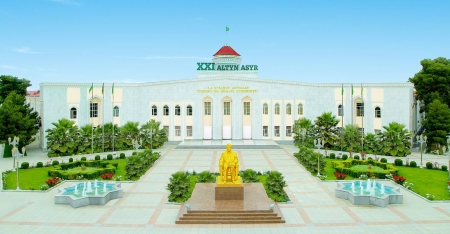
- University campus
- Established: 1930
- Rector: Kurbandurdy Mamedkuliev
- Location: 62 Gorogly Street, Ashgabat, Turkmenistan
- Campus: Urban
- Website: https://tohu.edu.tm/?/TRANSLATE/&lang=eng
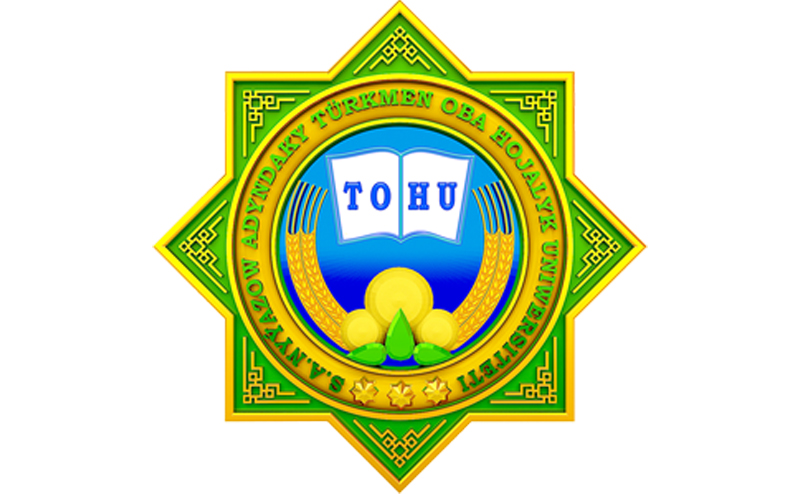

The Turkmen Agricultural University named after Saparmurat Niyazov (Turkmen: S.A.Nyýazow adyndaky Türkmen oba hojalyk Uniwersitety), often abbreviated as TOHU, is the largest higher education institution in Turkmenistan. This university only provides studies in the fields of agriculture. It is named after Saparmyrat Nyýazow, Turkmenistan's first president.

== History ==
In 1930, the Agricultural Institute was constructed in the capital city of Ashgabat. Until 1998, the institution was named after Mikhail Kalinin, after which, it was named after the then-serving president Saparmurat Niyazov. In 1998, was awarded university status, and had a name change. In 2012, the training center CLAAS was opened.

== Faculties ==
The university consists of eight departments:

- Agronomy
- Agricultural mechanization
- Textile production
- Processing of agricultural products
- Veterinary
- Hydromelioration
- Agroecology
- Economics and management of agriculture

== Alumni ==
- Annamurat Soltanov, Chief of General Staff of the Armed Forces of Turkmenistan
- Esenmyrat Orazgeldiýew, former Agriculture Minister of Turkmenistan
- Serdar Berdimuhamedow, President of Turkmenistan
