= Eastern Orthodoxy in Turkmenistan =

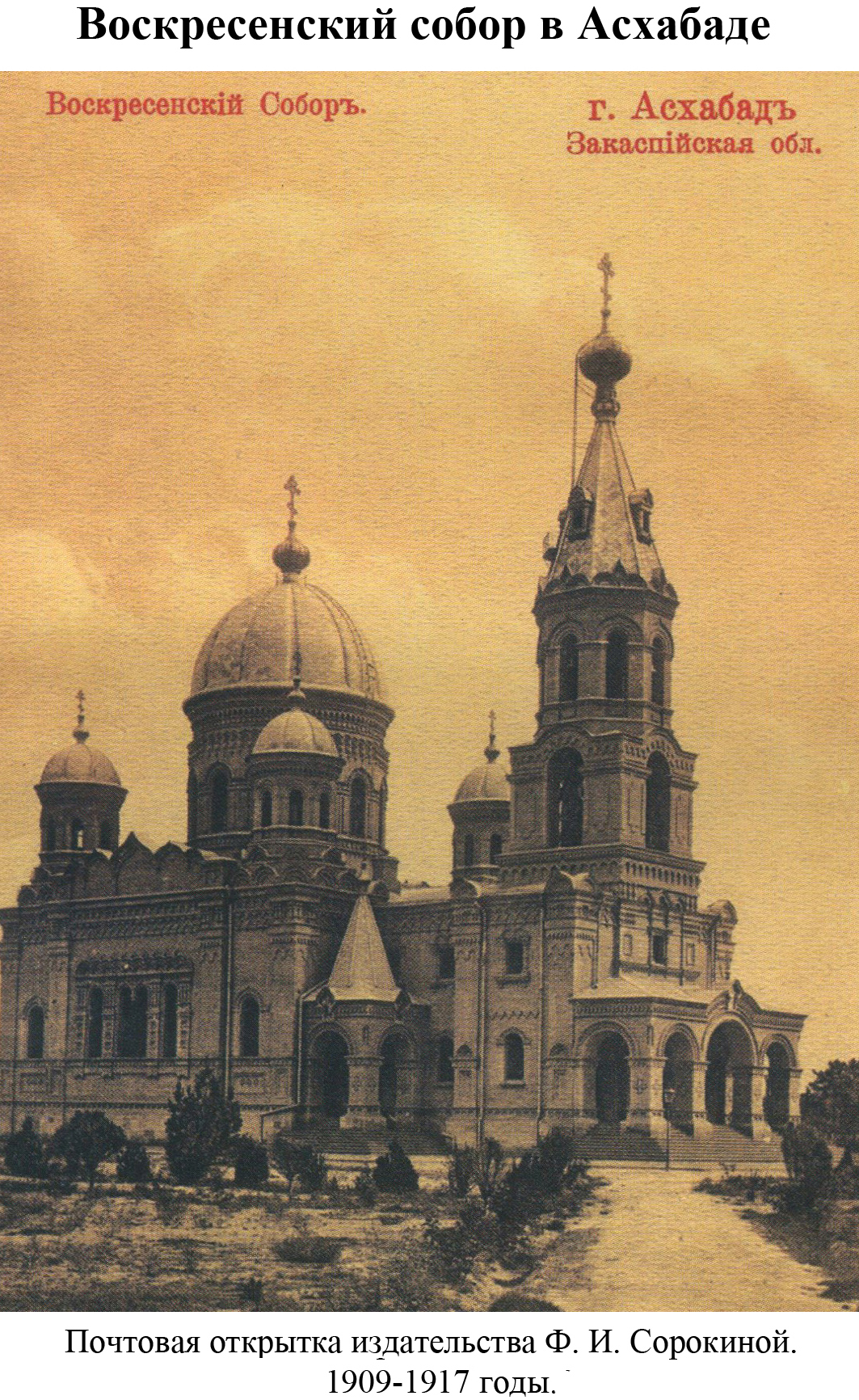
Resurrection Cathedral in Ashkhabad

Eastern Orthodoxy in Turkmenistan is a major proportion of Christianity in Turkmenistan. Turkmenistan has a Muslim majority. The Eastern Orthodox Christians are about 5% of the population.

== Russian Orthodox Church in Turkmenistan ==
The Russian Orthodox Church in Turkmenistan is under the jurisdiction of the Russian Orthodox Bishop of Pyatigorsk and Cherkessiya. There are 12 Russian Orthodox Churches in Turkmenistan, including four in Ashgabat, two in Türkmenabat, and one each in Balkanabat, Baýramaly, Daşoguz, Mary, Tejen, and Turkmenbashy. The senior Russian Orthodox priest in Turkmenistan is based in Ashgabat.

== See also ==
- St. Alexander Nevsky Church, Ashgabat
- Religion in Turkmenistan
- Protestantism in Turkmenistan
- Roman Catholicism in Turkmenistan
- Eastern Orthodoxy in Uzbekistan
- Eastern Orthodoxy in Azerbaijan
