= Catholic Church in Turkmenistan =

The Catholic Church in Turkmenistan is part of the worldwide Catholic Church, under the spiritual leadership of the Pope in Rome.

== History ==
All Catholic infrastructure in the country was destroyed by Soviet revolutionaries in the 1920s. In 1997 a request was made to recognize the local Catholic community, but was refused since the local church was not headed by a Turkmen. In July 2010, the Catholic Mission received official government recognition and plans were started to both ask permission to build a Catholic church, and to reclaim a Catholic Armenian church in Turkmenbasy that still stands in the west of the country, as well as a church building in Sendar. In the early 2000s, Mass was started to be celebrated at the apostolic nunciature in the capital and at parishioners' homes.

In 2026, there were 3 priests in the country, serving 300 Catholics in one chapel. From August 22, 2026 the Ordinary of the country (a priest with the authority of a Bishop) is Fr. Pawel Janusz Kubiak OMI. The former Ordinary was Fr. Andrzej Madej OMI.

== See also ==
- Religion in Turkmenistan
- Christianity in Turkmenistan
- Chapel of the Transfiguration, Ashgabat
- Mission sui iuris of Turkmenistan
