= Protestantism in Turkmenistan =

According to 2020 estimates, Protestants make up 0.04% of the population of Turkmenistan, or about 3% of the Christian community of the country. Other reports suggest that there are 2,000 Protestants in the country, worshiping in 8 churches.

Freedom of religion is guaranteed by article 11 of the Constitution of Turkmenistan; however, there are restrictions on non-Sunni religious groups.

Protestant churches find it very difficult to register with the government; this impacts their ability to run schools and import literature, among other benefits. Protestant leaders also note that clergy must go abroad to receive their religious education abroad or study via distance learning.

== List of Denominations ==
- Baptist Church in Turkmenistan
- German Evangelical Lutheran Church
- Korean Methodist Church

== See also ==
- Religion in Turkmenistan
- Christianity in Turkmenistan
- Human rights in Turkmenistan
