= Chapel of the Transfiguration, Ashgabat =

Chapel of the Transfiguration
- Location: Ashgabat
- Country: Turkmenistan
- Denomination: Roman Catholic Church

Architecture
- Demolished: 1932

The Chapel of the Transfiguration or the Chapel of the Transfiguration of the Lord, is a religious building that is part of the Apostolic Nunciature of the Holy See in the city of Ashkhabad, the capital of the Asian country of Turkmenistan.

The church was built in Ashabad from natural brick, in a Gothic style. On the huge altar was an icon of the Transfiguration of the Lord. On the sides of the altar were icons of Mary, donated by the Parish of St. Stanislav in St. Petersburg, and an icon of St. Expedite, ordered by the curator in Tashkent.

After the destruction by the Communist authorities during the time of the Soviet Union in Turkmenistan of all Catholic churches in the town, the activities of the Catholic Church in that nation were very limited or officially prohibited.

At the end of the twenties the Church was closed. The building fell into ruins and remained standing until 1932, when local authorities ordered it to be destroyed, in the era of religious persecution in the Soviet Union. Instead after the earthquake prefabricated wooden houses were built. These houses have remained until today.

After the fall of communism in the 1990s efforts were made to get approval from local authorities for reopening the places of Catholic worship. As part of these efforts, the Apostolic Nunciature in Turkmenistan managed to open a chapel that is the center of Meeting of Catholics in that city, until you can build a church outside the protection provided by the Vatican nunciature, or embassy in Turkmenistan.

In 2025, the Apostolic Nunciature and the chapel where Catholic Masses are celebrated were relocated to a new address: 31A Myati Kosayev Street (near Teke Bazar), Ashgabat, Turkmenistan (37.94610535614067, 58.372763103774204).

Mass Schedule (January, 2026):

- Monday to Friday: 18:30
- Saturday: 9:00
- Sunday: 10:00 and 18:00

Confession: 30 minutes before each Mass.

Eucharistic Adoration:

- Every first Thursday of the month: from 10:00 a.m.
- Other Thursdays: from 17:30

Religious services are offered in both Russian and English. The name of the church is due to the missing Church of the Transfiguration of the Lord that was destroyed in 1932.

== See also ==
- Embassy chapel
- Roman Catholicism in Turkmenistan
- Chapel of the Transfiguration
