= Christianity in Turkmenistan =

Christians, most of whom are ethnic Russians, constitute less than 40.0% of the population in Turkmenistan. Eastern Orthodoxy in Turkmenistan is the main form of Christianity.

== Russian Orthodox Church ==
The Russian Orthodox Church is officially recognized and constitute the largest religious minority.The Church is under the jurisdiction of the Russian Orthodox Archbishop in Tashkent, Uzbekistan.

== Other denominations ==
In 2020, around 300 Catholics lived in Turkmenistan.

In 2007 other denominations included German Lutherans, as well as the Evangelical Christian Baptist Church of Turkmenistan, Seventh-day Adventist Church of Turkmenistan, Full Gospel Christian Church of Turkmenistan (Pentecostals), Light of the East Church (Dashoguz Pentecostal Church), Greater Grace Church of Turkmenistan, International Church of Christ, and the New Apostolic Church of Turkmenistan who were all registered at that time. There was also a small number of Evangelical Christians in Turkmenistan.

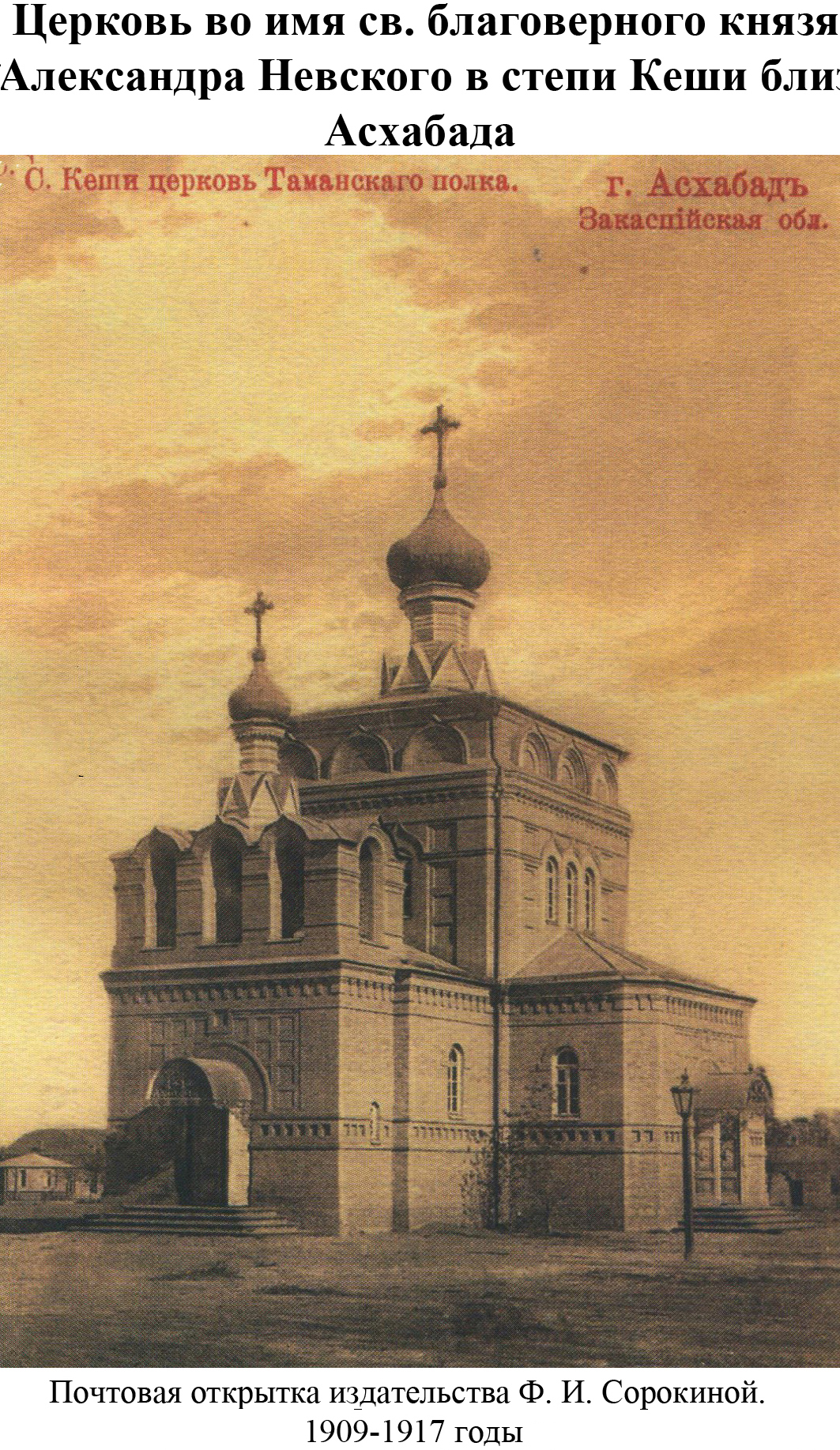
The St. Alexander Nevsky church in Ashgabat, a Russian Orthodox church constructed between 1909 and 1917.

== Freedom of religion ==
All religious groups have to register, and unregistered activity is illegal.

In 2023, the country scored zero out of 4 for religious freedom. It was noted that restrictions have tightened since 2016, the same year Turkmenistan was ranked the 26th worst place in the world to be a Christian.

In particular, people who were not Sunni or Russian Orthodox reported some harassment, and Muslims who had converted to Christianity face social pressure.

== See also ==
- Religion in Turkmenistan
- Protestantism in Turkmenistan
- Roman Catholicism in Turkmenistan
