= St. Alexander Nevsky Church, Ashgabat =

Coordinates: 37.9597°N 58.3440°E

St. Alexander Nevsky Church
- Храм Александра Невского
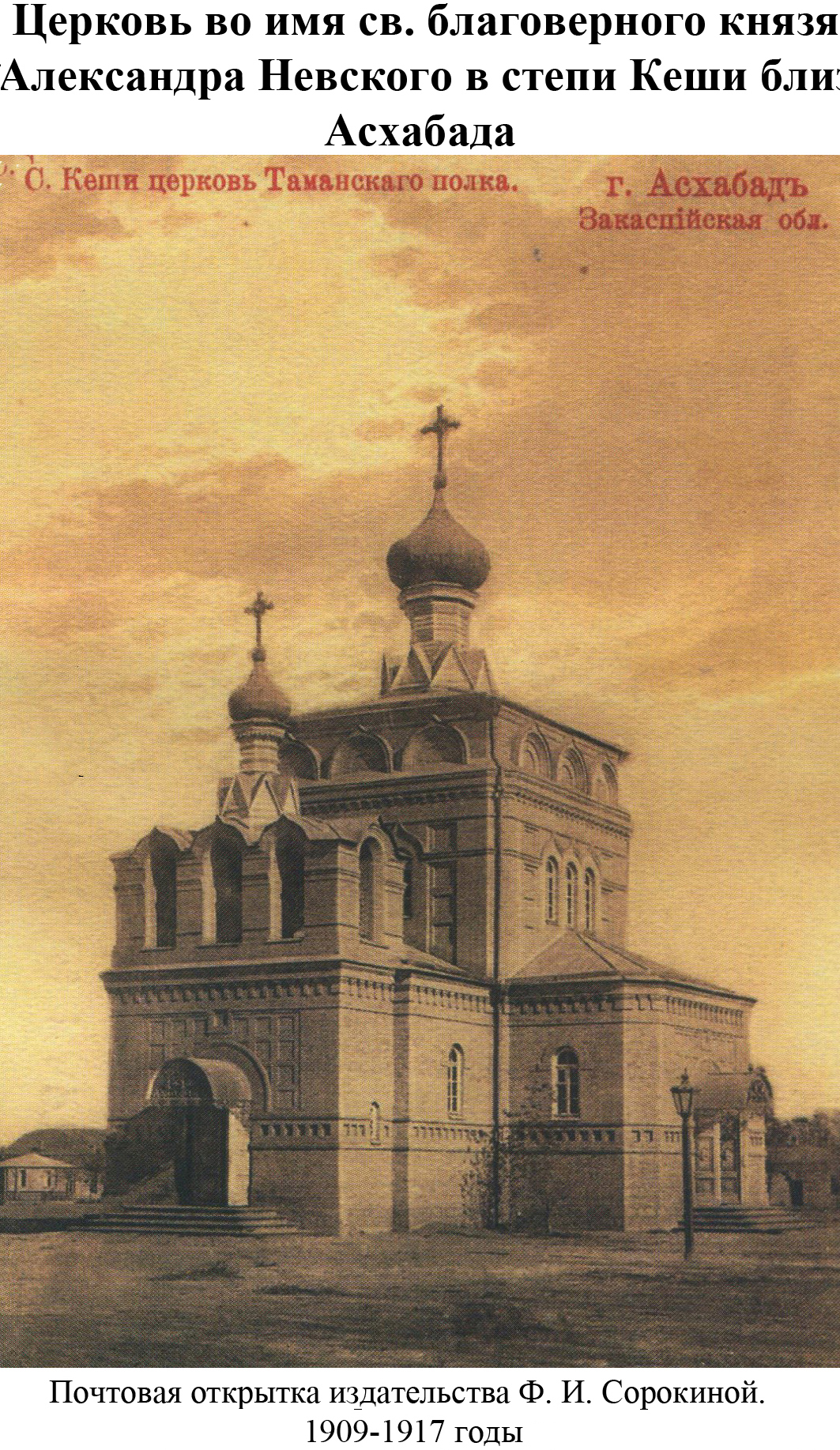

- Location within Turkmenistan
- Location: Ashgabat
- Country: Turkmenistan
- Denomination: Russian Orthodox Church

Architecture
- Groundbreaking: 1882
- Completed: 1900
- Construction cost: 14,740 rubles

Specifications
- Capacity: 350

The St. Alexander Nevsky Church (Russian: Храм Александра Невского) is a Russian Orthodox church in the city of Ashgabat, Turkmenistan. It is directed by Archpriest Ioann Kopach.

The church is cruciform and constructed of fired brick. It features a wooden dome under a tin roof and has a capacity for 350 worshipers. The church was originally notable for its iconostasis of rococo-style carved lime wood, acquired for 1,000 rubles from craftsman A.I. Kuklin of the town of Torzhok, Tver' guberniya; the iconostasis disappeared during the Soviet period.

== History ==
The Church of "Holy Blessed Grand Prince Alexander Nevsky" was established in 1882 and consecrated in 1900 as the parish church of the 1st Taman Regiment of the Kuban Cossack Host. At the time, the church was located outside the city limit, in the village of Koshi, which was annexed by Ashgabat in 2013. It was designed to accommodate 350 worshipers and constructed of fired brick by order of General Aleksey Kuropatkin at a total cost of 14,740 rubles.

In 1918 the church was deconsecrated and used as a warehouse on the military base. It was returned to the church in 1989 but required extensive renovations, including reopening two bricked-in doorways, replacement of the roof, replastering and repainting of icons on the interior, reconstruction of the bell tower and domes, and replacement of the iconostasis, which had disappeared. The church was reconsecrated in November 1993.

== See also ==
- Eastern Orthodoxy in Turkmenistan
