= Turkmenistan =

Country in Central Asia

Turkmenistan Türkmenistan
- Flag Emblem
- Motto: Türkmenistan Bitaraplygyň watanydyr "Turkmenistan is the motherland of Neutrality"
- Anthem: Türkmenistanyň Döwlet senasy "State Anthem of Turkmenistan"
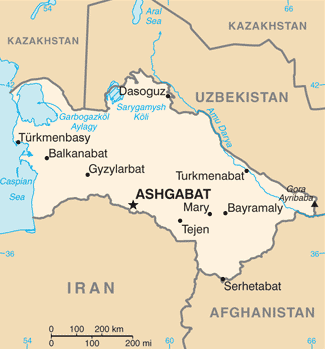
- Turkmenistan (orthographic projection)
- Capital and largest city: Ashgabat; 37°58′N 58°20′E
- Official languages: Turkmen
- Ethnic groups (2022): 86.7% Turkmens; 9.1% Uzbeks; 1.6% Russians; 1.2% Baloch; 1.3% others
- Religion (2025): 94.7% Islam; 93.69% Sunni; 1.10% Shia; 3.21% no religion; 1.25% Christianity; 0.1% others (incl. Baha’i)
- Demonyms: Turkmenistani; Turkmen
- Government: Unitary presidential republic under a totalitarian hereditary dictatorship
  - President: Serdar Berdimuhamedow
  - Deputy Chairman of the Cabinet of Ministers: Raşit Meredow
  - Chairman of the People's Council: Gurbanguly Berdimuhamedow (Note: Since 2023, also the de facto leader)
  - Chairperson of the Assembly: Dünýägözel Gulmanowa
  - Chairman of the Supreme Court: Begenç Hojamgulyýew
- Legislature: Assembly

Independence from the Soviet Union
  - Sovereignty declared: 22 August 1990
  - Independence declared: 27 October 1991
  - Independence recognized: 26 December 1991

Area
  - Total: 491,210 km^{2} (189,660 sq mi) (52nd)
  - Water: 24,069 km^{2} (9,293 sq mi)
  - Water (%): 4.9

Population
  - 2022 census: 7,057,841 (105th)
  - Density: 14.4/km^{2} (37.3/sq mi) (221st)
- GDP (PPP): 2026 estimate
  - Total: ▲$164.780 billion (83rd)
  - Per capita: ▲$24,401 (74th)
- GDP (nominal): 2026 estimate
  - Total: ▲$83.000 billion (78th)
  - Per capita: ▲$12,291 (72nd)
- Gini (1998): 40.8 medium inequality
- HDI (2023): ▲0.764 high (95th)
- Currency: Manat (TMT)
- Time zone: UTC+05:00 (TMT)
- Calling code: +993
- ISO 3166 code: TM
- Internet TLD: .tm

Turkmenistan (Note: /tɜːrkˈmɛnɪstæn/ turk-MEN-ih-stan or /ˌtɜːrkmɛnɪˈstɑːn/ TURK-men-ih-STAHN; Turkmen: Türkmenistan, pronounced [tʏɾkmønʏˈθːɑːn]), formerly known as Turkmenia, is a landlocked country in Central Asia, bordered by Kazakhstan and Uzbekistan to the north, Afghanistan to the southeast, Iran to the south and southwest, and the Caspian Sea to the west. It is one of six independent Turkic states. Ashgabat is the capital and largest city. With over 7 million people, Turkmenistan is the 35th most-populous country in Asia and has the lowest population of the Central Asian republics while being one of the most sparsely populated nations located on the Asian continent.

Turkmenistan has long served as a thoroughfare for several empires and cultures. Merv is one of the oldest oasis-cities in Central Asia, and was once among the biggest cities in the world. It was also one of the great cities of the Islamic world and an important stop on the Silk Road. Annexed by the Russian Empire in 1881, Turkmenistan figured prominently in the anti-Bolshevik movement in Central Asia. In 1925, Turkmenistan became a constituent republic of the Soviet Union, the Turkmen Soviet Socialist Republic (Turkmen SSR); it became independent after the dissolution of the Soviet Union in 1991.

Turkmenistan is widely criticized for its poor human rights record, including for its treatment of minorities, and its lack of press and religious freedoms. Since the independence declared from the Soviet Union in 1991, Turkmenistan has been ruled by repressive totalitarian regimes: that of President for Life Saparmurat Niyazov (also known as Türkmenbaşy or "Head of the Turkmens") until his death in 2006; Gurbanguly Berdimuhamedow, who became president in 2007 after winning a non-democratic election (who had been the minister of health, vice-president, and then acting president previously); and his son Serdar, who won a subsequent 2022 presidential election described by international observers as neither free nor fair, and now shares power with his father.

Turkmenistan possesses the world's fifth-largest reserves of natural gas, and many leaks. Most of the country is covered by the Karakum Desert. Turkmenistan is an observer state in the Organisation of Turkic States, a founding member of TÜRKSOY (the International Organization of Turkic Culture) and a member of the United Nations.

== Etymology ==
The name of Turkmenistan (Turkmen: Türkmenistan) can be divided into two components: the ethnonym Türkmen and the Persian suffix -stan meaning "place of" or "country". The name "Turkmen" comes from Turk, plus the Sogdian suffix -men, meaning "almost Turk", in reference to their status outside the Turkic dynastic mythological system.

Muslim chroniclers like Ibn Kathir suggested that the etymology of Turkmenistan came from the words Türk and iman (Arabic: إيمان, lit. 'faith/belief'); this is in reference to a massive conversion to Islam of two hundred thousand households in the year 971.

Turkmenistan declared its independence from the Soviet Union after the independence referendum in 1991. As a result, the constitutional law was adopted on 27 October of that year and Article 1 established the new name of the state: Turkmenistan (Türkmenistan / Түркменистан).

A common name for the Turkmen SSR was Turkmenia (Russian: Туркмения, romanization: Turkmeniya), used in some reports of the country's independence.

== History ==
Historically inhabited by Indo-Iranians, Turkmenistan's written history begins with its annexation by the Achaemenid Empire of ancient Iran. After centuries of turmoil, over a thousand years later, in the 8th century AD, Turkic-speaking Oghuz tribes moved from Mongolia into present-day Central Asia. Part of a powerful confederation of tribes, these Oghuz formed the ethnic basis of the modern Turkmen population. In the 10th century, the name "Turkmen" was first applied to Oghuz groups that accepted Islam and began to occupy present-day Turkmenistan. There they were under the dominion of the Seljuk Empire, which was composed of Oghuz groups living in present-day Iran and Turkmenistan. Oghuz groups in the service of the empire played an important role in the spreading of Turkic culture when they migrated westward into present-day Azerbaijan and eastern Turkey.

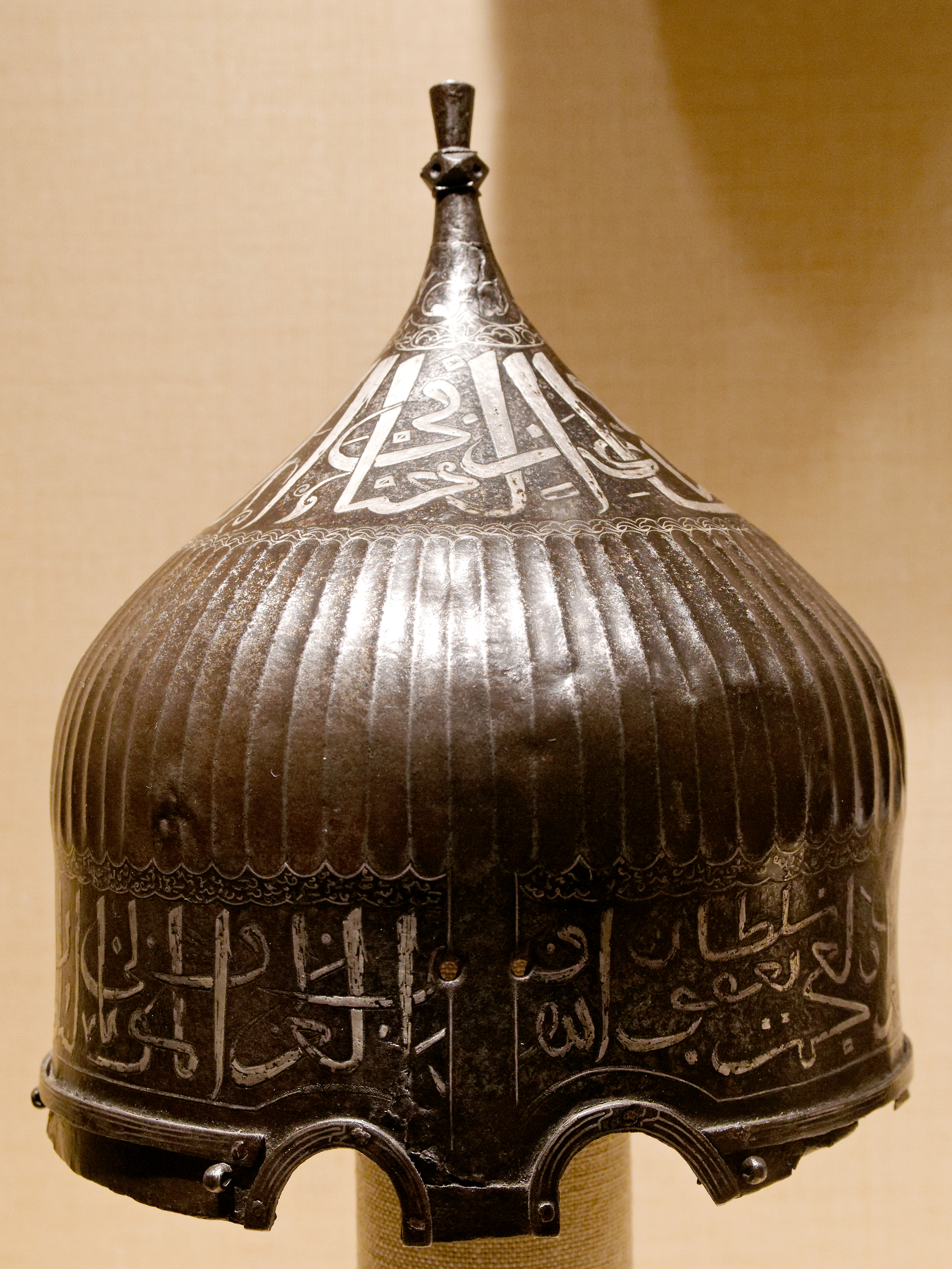
White Sheep Turkoman helmet (15th century)

In the 12th century, Turkmen and other tribes overthrew the Seljuk Empire. In the next century, the Mongols took over the more northern lands where the Turkmens had settled, scattering the Turkmens southward and contributing to the formation of new tribal groups. The sixteenth and eighteenth centuries saw a series of splits and confederations among the nomadic Turkmen tribes, who remained staunchly independent and inspired fear in their neighbors. By the 16th century, most of those tribes were under the nominal control of two sedentary Uzbek khanates, Khiva and Bukhoro. Turkmen soldiers were an important element of the Uzbek militaries of this period. In the 19th century, raids and rebellions by the Yomud Turkmen group resulted in that group's dispersal by the Uzbek rulers. In 1855 the Turkmen tribe of Teke led by Gowshut-Khan defeated the invading army of the Khan of Khiva Muhammad Amin Khan and in 1861 the invading Persian army of Nasreddin-Shah.

In the second half of the 19th century, northern Turkmens were the main military and political power in the Khanate of Khiva. According to Paul R. Spickard, "Prior to the Russian conquest, the Turkmen were known and feared for their involvement in the Central Asian slave trade."

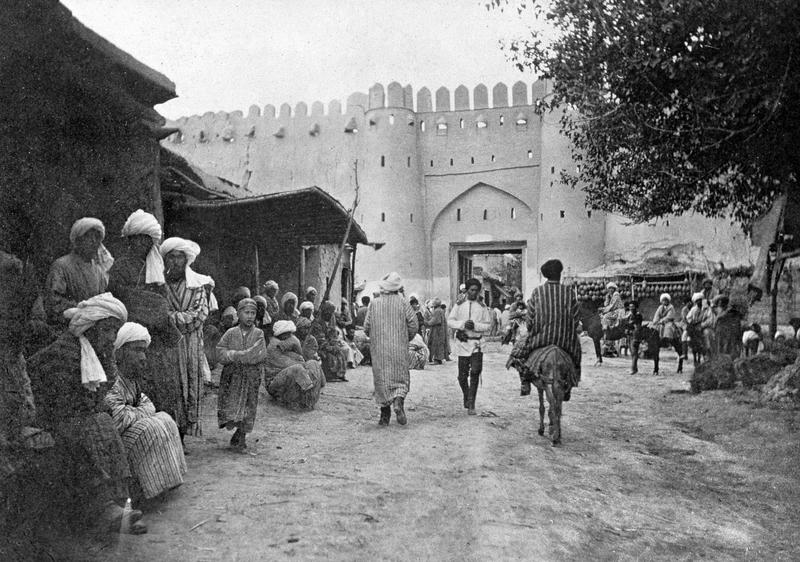
City of Çärjew in Russian Turkestan, 1890

Russian forces began occupying Turkmen territory late in the 19th century. From their Caspian Sea base at Krasnovodsk (now Türkmenbaşy), the Russians eventually overcame the Uzbek khanates. In 1879, the Russian forces were defeated by the Teke Turkmens during the first attempt to conquer the Ahal area of Turkmenistan. However, in 1881, the last significant resistance in Turkmen territory was crushed at the Battle of Geok Tepe, and shortly thereafter Turkmenistan was annexed, together with adjoining Uzbek territory, into the Russian Empire. In 1916, the Russian Empire's participation in World War I resonated in Turkmenistan, as an anticonscription revolt swept most of Russian Central Asia. Although the Russian Revolution of 1917 had little direct impact, in the 1920s Turkmen forces joined Kazakhs, Kyrgyz, and Uzbeks in the so-called Basmachi rebellion against the rule of the newly formed Soviet Union. In 1921 the tsarist province of Transcaspia (Russian: Закаспийская область, 'Transcaspian Oblast') was renamed Turkmen Oblast (Russian: Туркменская область), and in 1924, the Turkmen Soviet Socialist Republic was formed from it. By the late 1930s, Soviet reorganization of agriculture had destroyed what remained of the nomadic lifestyle in Turkmenistan, and Moscow controlled political life. The Ashgabat earthquake of 1948 killed over 110,000 people, amounting to two-thirds of the city's population.

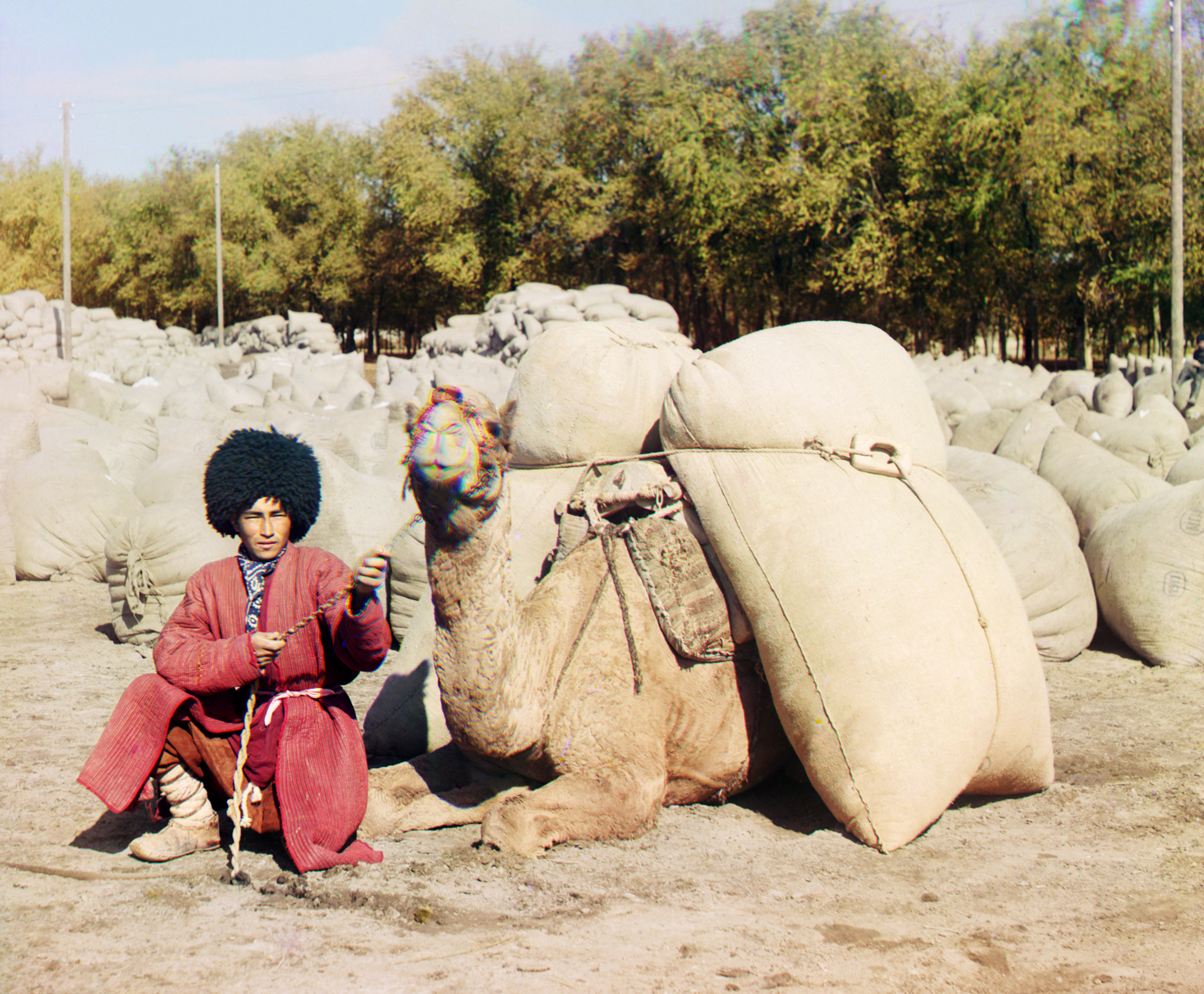
A Turkmen man of Central Asia in traditional clothes. Photo by Prokudin-Gorsky between 1905 and 1915.

During the next half-century, Turkmenistan played its designated economic role within the Soviet Union and remained outside the course of major world events. Even the major liberalization movement that shook Russia in the late 1980s had little impact. However, in 1990, the Supreme Soviet of Turkmenistan declared sovereignty as a nationalist response to perceived exploitation by Moscow. Although Turkmenistan was ill-prepared for independence and then-communist leader Saparmurat Niyazov preferred to preserve the Soviet Union, in October 1991, the fragmentation of that entity forced him to call a national referendum that approved independence. On 26 December 1991, the Soviet Union ceased to exist. Niyazov continued as Turkmenistan's chief of state, replacing communism with a unique brand of independent nationalism reinforced by a pervasive cult of personality. A 1994 referendum and legislation in 1999 abolished further requirements for the president to stand for re-election (although in 1992 he completely dominated the only presidential election in which he ran, as he was the only candidate and no one else was allowed to run for the office), making him effectively president for life. During his tenure, Niyazov conducted frequent purges of public officials and abolished organizations deemed threatening. Throughout the post-Soviet era, Turkmenistan has taken a neutral position on almost all international issues. Niyazov eschewed membership in regional organizations such as the Shanghai Cooperation Organisation, and in the late 1990s he maintained relations with the Taliban and its chief opponent in Afghanistan, the Northern Alliance. From 1993 to 2019, citizens received government-provided electricity, water and natural gas free of charge. Niyazov offered limited support to the military campaign against the Taliban following the 11 September 2001 attacks. In 2002 an alleged assassination attempt against Niyazov led to a new wave of security restrictions, dismissals of government officials, and restrictions placed on the media. Niyazov accused exiled former foreign minister Boris Shikhmuradov of having planned the attack.

Between 2002 and 2004, serious tension arose between Turkmenistan and Uzbekistan because of bilateral disputes and Niyazov's implication that Uzbekistan had a role in the 2002 assassination attempt. In 2004, a series of bilateral treaties restored friendly relations. In the parliamentary elections of December 2004 and January 2005, only Niyazov's party was represented, and no international monitors participated. In 2005, Niyazov exercised his dictatorial power by closing all hospitals outside Ashgabat and all rural libraries. The year 2006 saw intensification of the trends of arbitrary policy changes, shuffling of top officials, diminishing economic output outside the oil and gas sector, and isolation from regional and world organizations. China was among a very few nations to whom Turkmenistan made significant overtures. The sudden death of Niyazov at the end of 2006 left a complete vacuum of power, as his cult of personality had precluded the naming of a successor. Deputy Prime Minister Gurbanguly Berdimuhamedow, who was named interim head of government, won a non-democratic special presidential election held in early February 2007. His appointment as interim president and subsequent run for president violated the constitution. Berdimuhamedow won two additional non-democratic elections, with approximately 97% of the vote in both 2012 and 2017. His son Serdar Berdimuhamedow won a non-democratic snap presidential election in 2022, establishing a political dynasty in Turkmenistan. On 19 March 2022, Serdar Berdimuhamedov was sworn in as Turkmenistan's new president to succeed his father.

== Geography ==
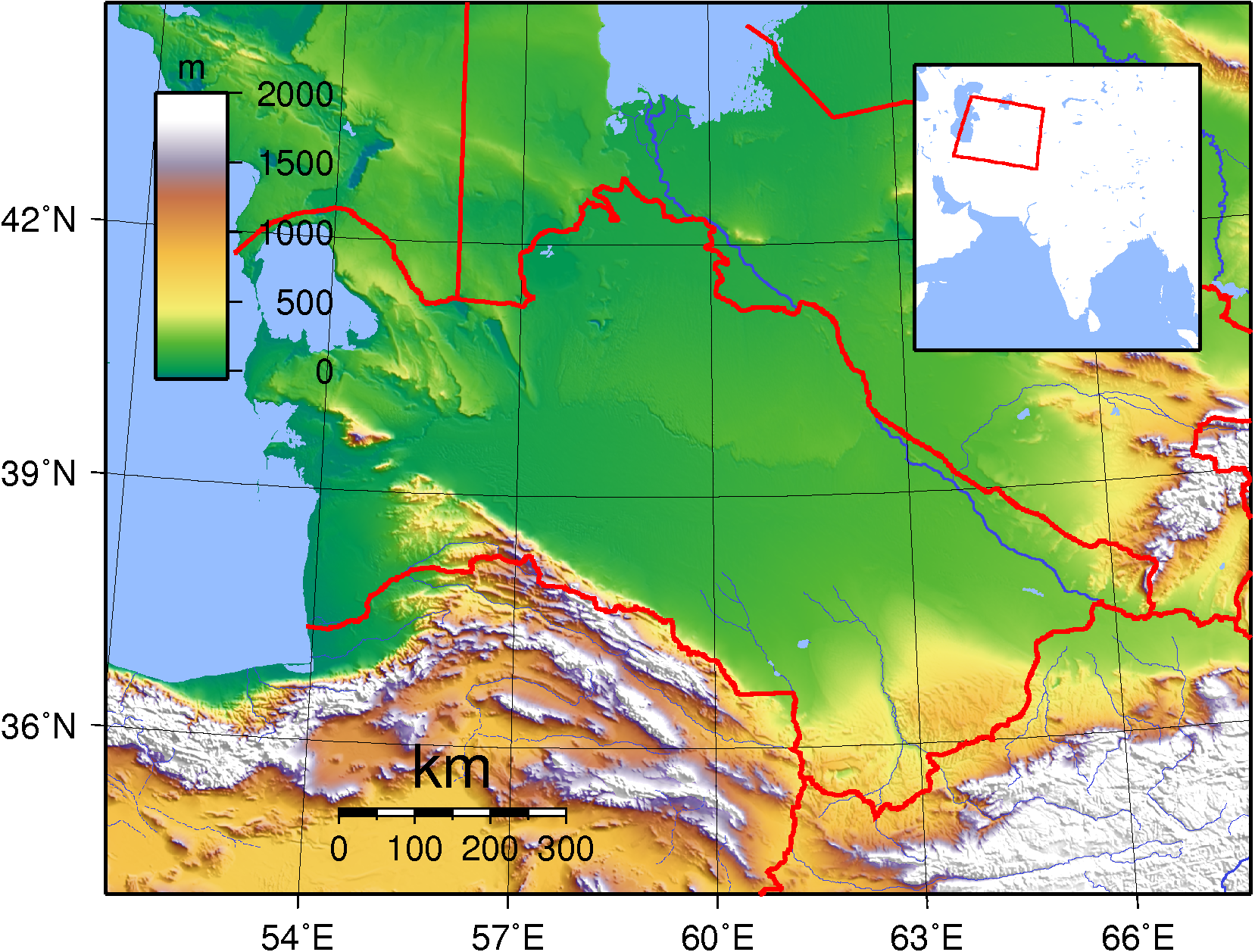
Topography of Turkmenistan

At 488,100 km^{2} (188,500 sq mi), Turkmenistan is the world's 52nd-largest country. It is slightly smaller than Spain and larger than Cameroon. It lies between latitudes 35° and 43° N, and longitudes 52° and 67° E. Over 80% of the country is covered by the Karakum Desert. The center of the country is dominated by the Turan Depression and the Karakum Desert. Topographically, Turkmenistan is bounded by the Ustyurt Plateau to the north, the Kopet Dag Range to the south, the Paropamyz Plateau, the Koytendag Range to the east, the Amu Darya Valley, and the Caspian Sea to the west. Turkmenistan includes three tectonic regions, the Epigersin platform region, the Alpine shrinkage region, and the Epiplatform orogenesis region. The Alpine tectonic region is the epicenter of earthquakes in Turkmenistan. Strong earthquakes occurred in the Kopet Dag Range in 1869, 1893, 1895, 1929, 1948, and 1994. The city of Ashgabat and surrounding villages were largely destroyed by the 1948 earthquake.

The Kopet Dag mountain range, along the southwestern border, reaches 2,912 metres (9,554 feet) at Kuh-e Rizeh (Mount Rizeh).

The Great Balkhan Range in the west of the country (Balkan Province) and the Köýtendag Range on the southeastern border with Uzbekistan (Lebap Province) are the only other significant elevations. The Great Balkhan Range rises to 1,880 metres (6,170 ft) at Mount Arlan and the highest summit in Turkmenistan is Ayrybaba in the Kugitangtau Range – 3,137 metres (10,292 ft). The Kopet Dag mountain range forms most of the border between Turkmenistan and Iran.

Major rivers include the Amu Darya, the Murghab River, the Tejen River, and the Atrek (Etrek) River. Tributaries of the Atrek include the Sumbar River and Chandyr River.

The Turkmen shore along the Caspian Sea is 1,748 kilometres (1,086 mi) long. The Caspian Sea is entirely landlocked, with no natural access to the ocean, although the Volga–Don Canal allows shipping access to and from the Black Sea.

Major cities include Aşgabat, Türkmenbaşy (formerly Krasnovodsk), Balkanabat, Daşoguz, Türkmenabat, and Mary.

=== Climate, biodiversity and environment ===
Köppen climate classifications of Turkmenistan

Turkmenistan is in a temperate desert zone with a dry continental climate. Remote from the open sea, with mountain ranges to the south and southeast, Turkmenistan's climate is characterized by low precipitation, low cloudiness, and high evaporation. Absence of mountains to the north allows cold Arctic air to penetrate southward to the southerly mountain ranges, which in turn block warm, moist air from the Indian Ocean. Limited winter and spring rains are attributable to moist air from the west, originating in the Atlantic Ocean and Mediterranean Sea. Winters are mild and dry, with most precipitation falling between January and May. The Kopet Dag Range receives the highest level of precipitation.

The Karakum Desert is one of the driest deserts in the world; some places have an average annual precipitation of only 12 mm (0.47 in). The highest temperature recorded in Ashgabat is 48.0 °C (118.4 °F) and Kerki, an extreme inland city located on the banks of the Amu Darya river, recorded 51.7 °C (125.1 °F) in July 1983, although this value is unofficial. 50.1 °C (122 °F) is the highest temperature recorded at Repetek Reserve, recognized as the highest temperature ever recorded in the whole former Soviet Union. Turkmenistan enjoys 235–240 sunny days per year. The average number of degree days ranges from 4500 to 5000 Celsius, sufficient for production of extra long staple cotton.

Turkmenistan contains seven terrestrial ecoregions: Alai-Western Tian Shan steppe, Kopet Dag woodlands and forest steppe, Badghyz and Karabil semi-desert, Caspian lowland desert, Central Asian riparian woodlands, Central Asian southern desert, and Kopet Dag semi-desert.

Turkmenistan's greenhouse gas emissions per person (17.5 tCO2e) are considerably higher than the OECD average, due mainly to natural gas seepage from oil and gas exploration.

== Government and politics ==
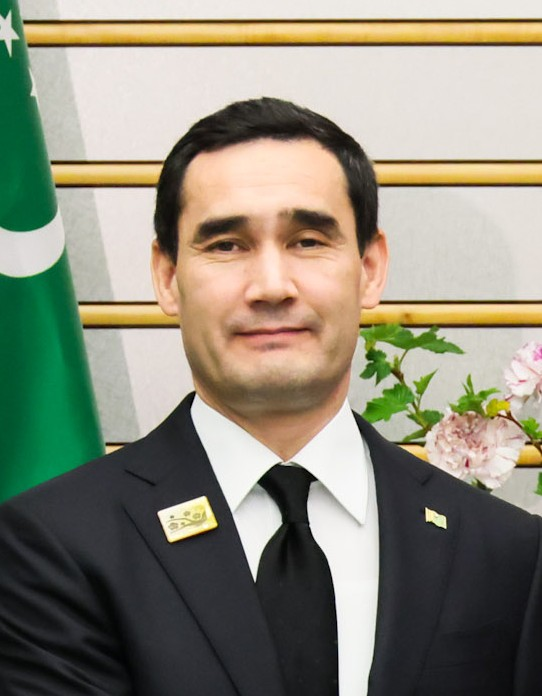
Serdar Berdimuhamedow
President

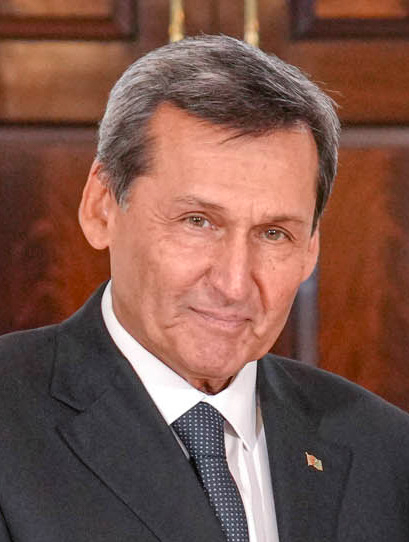
Raşit Meredow
Vice President

After over a century of being a part of the Russian Empire and then the Soviet Union (including 67 years as a union republic), Turkmenistan declared its independence on 27 October 1991, following the dissolution of the Soviet Union.

Saparmurat Niyazov, a former official of the Communist Party of the Soviet Union, ruled Turkmenistan from 1985, when he became head of the Communist Party of the Turkmen SSR, until his death in 2006. He retained absolute control over the country as President after the dissolution of the Soviet Union. On 28 December 1999, Niyazov was declared President for Life of Turkmenistan by the Mejlis (parliament), which itself had taken office a week earlier in elections that included only candidates hand-picked by President Niyazov. No opposition candidates were allowed.

The former Communist Party, now known as the Democratic Party of Turkmenistan, is the dominant party. The second party, the Party of Industrialists and Entrepreneurs, was established in August 2012, and an agrarian party appeared two years later. Political gatherings are illegal unless government sanctioned. In 2013, the first multi-party parliamentary elections were held in Turkmenistan. Turkmenistan was a one-party state from 1991 to 2012; however, the 2013 elections were widely seen as rigged. In practice, all parties in parliament operate jointly under the direction of the DPT. There are no true opposition parties in the Turkmen parliament.

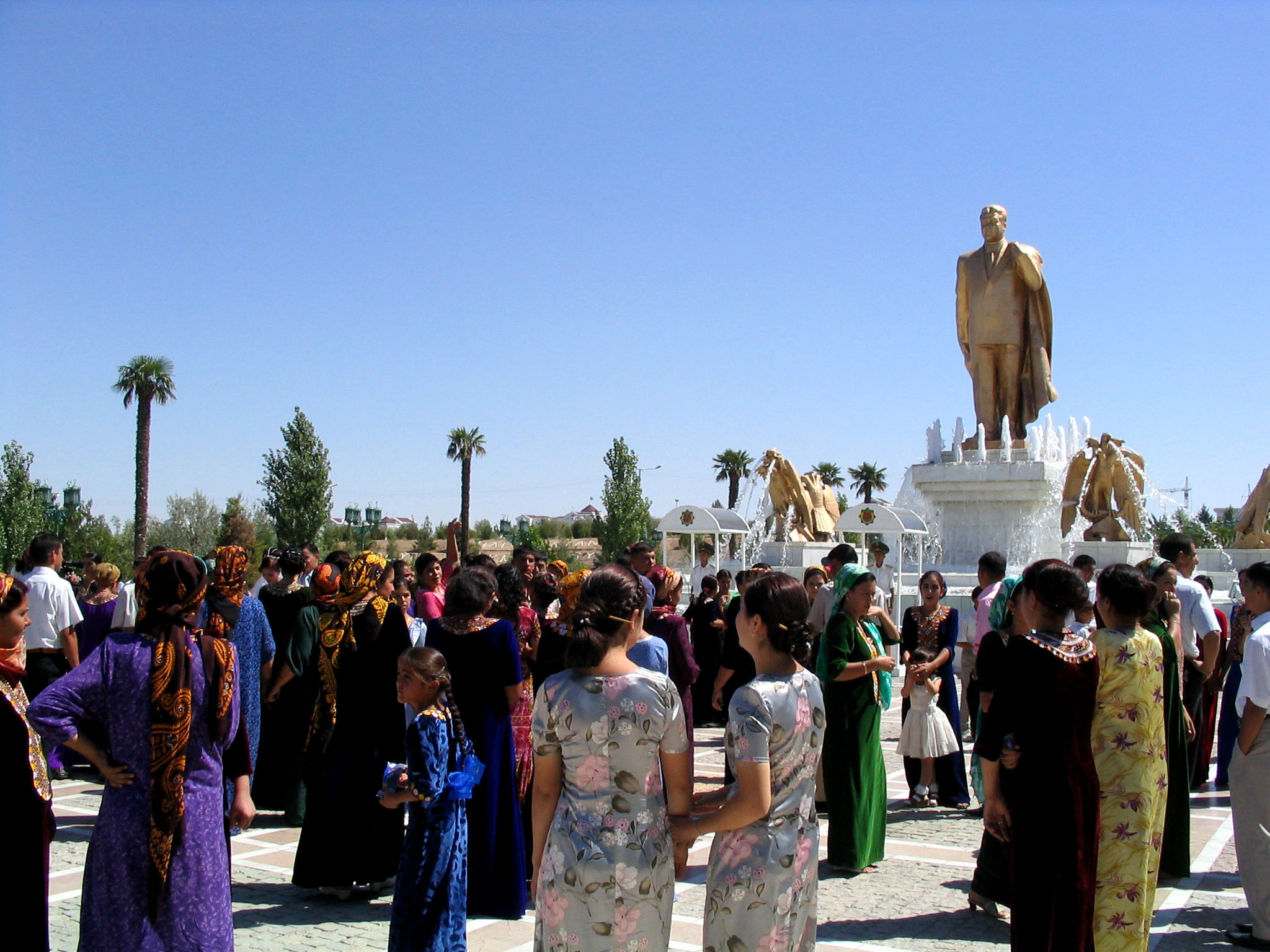
Golden statue of Saparmurat Niyazov in Ashgabat

Since the December 2006 death of Niyazov, Turkmenistan's leadership has made tentative moves to open up the country. His successor, President Gurbanguly Berdimuhamedow, repealed some of Niyazov's most idiosyncratic policies, including banning operas and circuses for being "insufficiently Turkmen", though other such rules were later put into place such as the banning of non-white cars. In education, Berdimuhamedow's government increased basic education from nine years to ten, and higher education was extended from four years to five. Berdimuhamedow was succeeded by his son Serdar in 2022.

The politics of Turkmenistan take place in the framework of a presidential republic, with the President both head of state and head of government. Under Niyazov, Turkmenistan had a one-party system; however, in September 2008, the People's Council unanimously passed a resolution adopting a new Constitution. The latter resulted in the abolition of the council and a significant increase in the size of Parliament in December 2008 and also permits the formation of multiple political parties.

According to International IDEA's Global State of Democracy (GSoD) Indices and Democracy Tracker, Turkmenistan performs in the low range on overall democratic measures, with particular weaknesses in local democracy, civic engagement, and civil society.

=== Legislature ===
The Assembly (Turkmen: Mejlis) is since January 2023 the unicameral legislature of Turkmenistan. Between March 2021 and 21 January 2023 it was the lower house of the now defunct bicameral National Council of Turkmenistan (Turkmen: Milli Geňeş). It has 125 members, elected for five-year terms in single-seat constituencies.

The People's Council of Turkmenistan (Turkmen: Halk Maslahaty, [xɑlq mɑθlɑxɑt̪ɯ]; "People's Council") is Turkmenistan's independent "representative body" exerting supreme constitutional authority. It includes in its membership, but is not considered part of, the legislature. Inter alia it is empowered to amend the constitution. Its chairperson is appointed by the president and is designated the "National Leader". State media referred to the People's Council as the "supreme organ of government authority". From 2018 to 2023 it was the upper chamber of the National Council of Turkmenistan.

Outside observers consider the Turkmen legislature to be a rubber stamp parliament. The 2018 OSCE election observer mission noted,

The 25 March elections lacked important prerequisites of a genuinely democratic electoral process. The political environment is only nominally pluralist and does not offer voters political alternatives. Exercise of fundamental freedoms is severely curtailed, inhibiting free expression of the voters' will. Despite measures to demonstrate transparency, the integrity of elections was not ensured, leaving veracity of results in doubt

=== Judiciary ===
The judiciary in Turkmenistan is not independent. Under Articles 71 and 100 of the constitution of Turkmenistan, the president appoints all judges, including the chairperson (chief justice) of the Supreme Court, and may dismiss them with the consent of the Parliament. Outside observers consider the Turkmen legislature to be a rubber stamp parliament, and thus despite constitutional guarantees of judicial independence under Articles 98 and 99, the judiciary is de facto firmly under presidential control. The chief justice is considered a member of the executive authority of the government and sits on the State Security Council. The U.S. Department of State stated in its 2020-human rights report on Turkmenistan,

Although the law provides for an independent judiciary, the executive controls it, and it is subordinate to the executive. There was no legislative review of the president's judicial appointments and dismissals. The president had sole authority to dismiss any judge. The judiciary was widely reputed to be corrupt and inefficient.

Many national laws of Turkmenistan have been published online on the Ministry of Justice website.

=== Administrative divisions ===
Turkmenistan is divided into five regions or welayatlar (singular welayat) and one capital city district. The provinces are subdivided into districts (etraplar, sing. etrap), which may be either counties or cities. According to the Constitution of Turkmenistan (Article 16 in the 2008 Constitution, Article 47 in the 1992 Constitution), some cities may have the status of welaýat (province) or etrap (district).

As a unitary state, power is centralised in the national government.

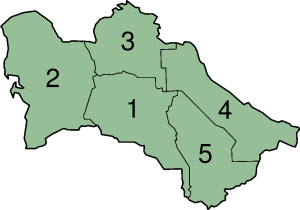

Division	ISO 3166-2	Capital city	Area	Pop (2022 Census)
Ashgabat City	TM-S	Ashgabat	470 km^{2} (180 sq mi)	1,030,063
Ahal Region	TM-A	Arkadag	97,160 km^{2} (37,510 sq mi)	886,845
Balkan Region	TM-B	Balkanabat	139,270 km^{2} (53,770 sq mi)	529,895
Daşoguz Region	TM-D	Daşoguz	73,430 km^{2} (28,350 sq mi)	1,550,354
Lebap Region	TM-L	Türkmenabat	93,730 km^{2} (36,190 sq mi)	1,447,298
Mary Region	TM-M	Mary	87,150 km^{2} (33,650 sq mi)	1,613,386

=== Foreign relations ===
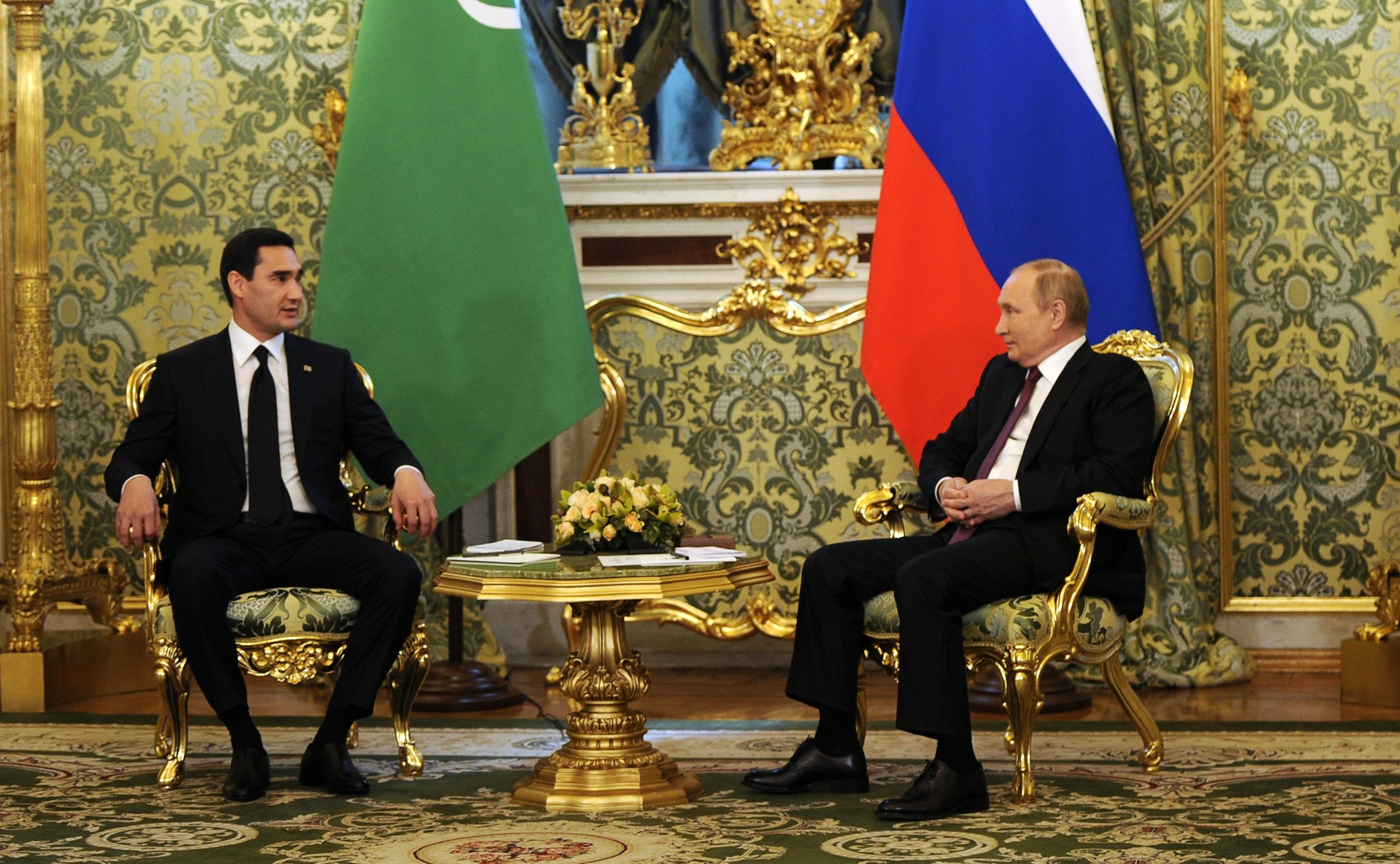
Turkmenistani President Serdar Berdimuhamedow and Russian President Vladimir Putin in Moscow on 10 June 2022

Turkmenistan's declaration of "permanent neutrality" was formally recognized by the United Nations in 1995. Former President Saparmurat Niyazov stated that the neutrality would prevent Turkmenistan from participating in multi-national defense organizations, but allows military assistance. Its neutral foreign policy has an important place in the country's constitution. Turkmenistan has diplomatic relations with 139 countries. Turkmenistan is a member of the United Nations, the International Monetary Fund, the World Bank, the Economic Cooperation Organization, the Organization for Security and Cooperation in Europe, the Organisation of Islamic Cooperation, the Islamic Development Bank, Asian Development Bank, European Bank for Reconstruction and Development, the Food and Agriculture Organization, International Organization of Turkic Culture and observer member of Organisation of Turkic States.

Turkmenistan is the 83rd most peaceful country in the world, according to the 2024 Global Peace Index.

=== Military ===
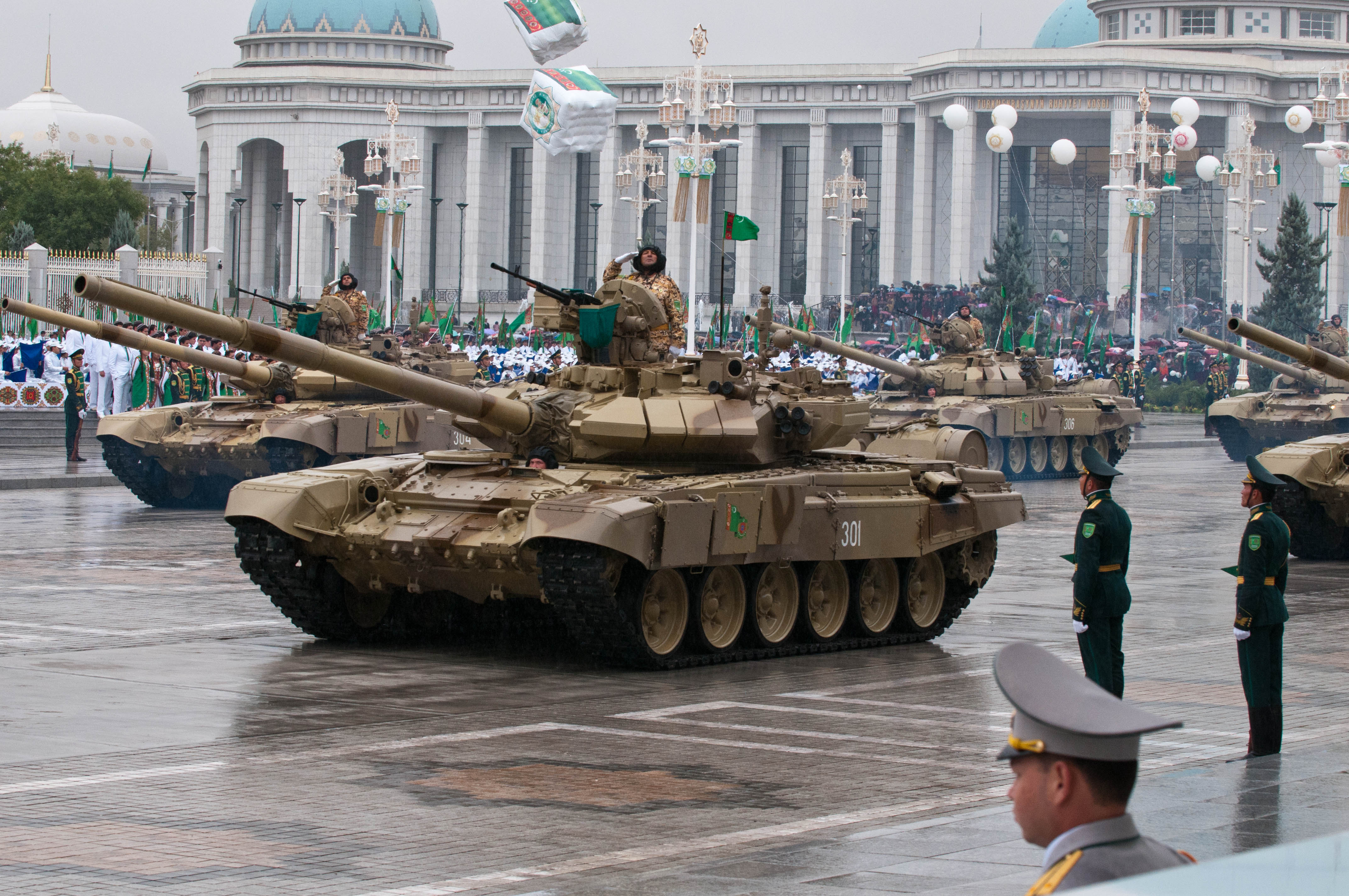
T-90SA and T-72UMG units

The Armed Forces of Turkmenistan (Turkmen: Türkmenistanyň Ýaragly Güýçleri), known informally as the Turkmen National Army (Turkmen: Türkmenistanyň Milli goşun) is the national military of Turkmenistan. It consists of the Ground Forces, the Air Force and Air Defense Forces, Navy, and other independent formations (etc. Border Troops, Internal Troops and National Guard).

=== Law enforcement ===
The national police force in Turkmenistan is mostly governed by the Interior Ministry. The Ministry of National Security (KNB) is the intelligence-gathering asset. The Interior Ministry commands the 25,000 personnel of the national police force directly, while the KNB deals with intelligence and counterintelligence work.

=== Human rights ===
Turkmenistan has been widely criticised for human rights abuses and has imposed severe restrictions on foreign travel for its citizens. Discrimination against the country's ethnic minorities remains in practice. Universities have been encouraged to reject applicants with non-Turkmen surnames, especially ethnic Russians. It is forbidden to teach the customs and language of the Baloch, an ethnic minority. The same happens to Uzbeks, though the Uzbek language was formerly taught in some national schools.

According to Human Rights Watch, "Turkmenistan remains one of the world's most repressive countries. The country is virtually closed to independent scrutiny, media and religious freedoms are subject to draconian restrictions, and human rights defenders and other activists face the constant threat of government reprisal."

According to Reporters Without Borders's 2014 World Press Freedom Index, Turkmenistan had the 3rd worst press freedom conditions in the world (178/180 countries), just before North Korea and Eritrea. It is considered to be one of the "10 Most Censored Countries". Each broadcast under Niyazov began with a pledge that the broadcaster's tongue will shrivel if he slanders the country, flag, or president.

Religious minorities are discriminated against for conscientious objection and practising their religion by imprisonment, preventing foreign travel, confiscating copies of Christian literature, or defamation. Many detainees who have been arrested for exercising their freedom of religion or belief were tortured and subsequently sentenced to imprisonment, many of them without a court decision. Homosexual acts are illegal in Turkmenistan.

The use of the death penalty in the country was suspended in 1999, before being formally abolished in 2008.

=== Restrictions on free and open communication ===
Despite the launch of Turkmenistan's first communication satellite, the TurkmenSat 1, in April 2015, the Turkmen government banned all satellite dishes in Turkmenistan the same month. The statement issued by the government indicated that all existing satellite dishes would have to be removed or destroyed, despite the communications receiving antennas having been legally installed since 1995, in an effort by the government to fully block access of the population to many "hundreds of independent international media outlets" which are currently accessible in the country only through satellite dishes, including all leading international news channels in different languages. The main target of this campaign is Radio Azatlyk, the Turkmen-language service of Radio Free Europe/Radio Liberty.

Internet access is filtered and websites to which the government objects are blocked. Blocked websites include opposition news media, YouTube, many social media sites (including Facebook), and encrypted communications applications. Use of virtual private networks to circumvent censorship is prohibited.

=== Corruption ===
Transparency International's 2021 Corruption Perceptions Index placed Turkmenistan in a tie with Burundi and the Democratic Republic of the Congo for 169th place globally, between Chad and Equatorial Guinea, with a score of 19 out of 100.

Opposition media and foreign human rights organizations describe Turkmenistan as suffering from rampant corruption. A non-governmental organization, Crude Accountability, has openly called the economy of Turkmenistan a kleptocracy. Opposition and domestic state-controlled media have described widespread bribery in education and law enforcement. In 2019, the national chief of police, Minister of Internal Affairs Isgender Mulikov, was convicted and imprisoned for corruption. In 2020, the deputy prime minister for education and science, Pürli Agamyradow, was dismissed for failure to control bribery in education.

The illegal adoption of abandoned babies in Turkmenistan is blamed on rampant corruption in the agencies involved in the legal adoption process which pushes some parents to a "cheaper and faster" option. One married couple in the eastern Farap district said that they had to provide documents and letters from 40 different agencies to support their adoption application, yet three years later there was still no decision on their bid. Meanwhile, wealthier applicants in Farap received a child for legal adoption within four months after applying because they paid up to 50,000 manats (about $14,300) in bribes.

== Economy ==
The country possesses the world's fourth largest reserves of natural gas and substantial oil resources.

Turkmenistan has taken a cautious approach to economic reform, hoping to use gas and cotton sales to sustain its economy. In 2019, the unemployment rate was estimated to be 4.27%.

Between 1998 and 2002, Turkmenistan suffered from the continued lack of adequate export routes for natural gas and from obligations on extensive short-term external debt. At the same time, however, the value of total exports rose sharply due to increases in international oil and gas prices. The subsequent collapse of both hydrocarbon and cotton prices in 2014 cut revenues from export sales severely, causing Turkmenistan to run trade deficits from 2015 through 2017. Economic prospects in the near future are discouraging because of widespread internal poverty and the burden of foreign debt, coupled with continued low hydrocarbon prices and reduced Chinese purchases of natural gas. One reflection of economic stress is the black-market exchange rate for the Turkmen manat, which though officially set at 3.5 manats to the US dollar, reportedly was trading in November 2022 at 18.5 manats to the dollar.

President Niyazov spent much of the country's revenue on extensively renovating cities, Ashgabat in particular. Corruption watchdogs voiced particular concern over the management of Turkmenistan's currency reserves, most of which are held in off-budget funds such as the Foreign Exchange Reserve Fund in the Deutsche Bank in Frankfurt, according to a report released in April 2006 by London-based non-governmental organization Global Witness.

From the time of its independence to 2019, Turkmenistan provided a certain quantity of electricity, natural gas, water and salt to its citizens for free per month or day. According to a decree of the Peoples' Council of 14 August 2003, electricity, natural gas, water and salt were to have been subsidized for citizens until 2030. Under implementing regulations, every citizen was entitled to 35 kilowatt hours of electricity and 50 cubic meters of natural gas each month. The state also provided 250 liters (66 gallons) of water per day. After he acceded to power in 2007, Gurbanguly Berdimuhamedov maintained the subsidies but gradually set maximum caps on free usage. As of 1 January 2019, however, all such subsidies were abolished, and payment for utilities was implemented.

On 1 January 2026, President Serdar Berdimuhamedov signed a bill which regulated virtual assets and created a licensing scheme for cryptocurrency exchanges under the country's national bank.

=== Natural gas and export routes ===
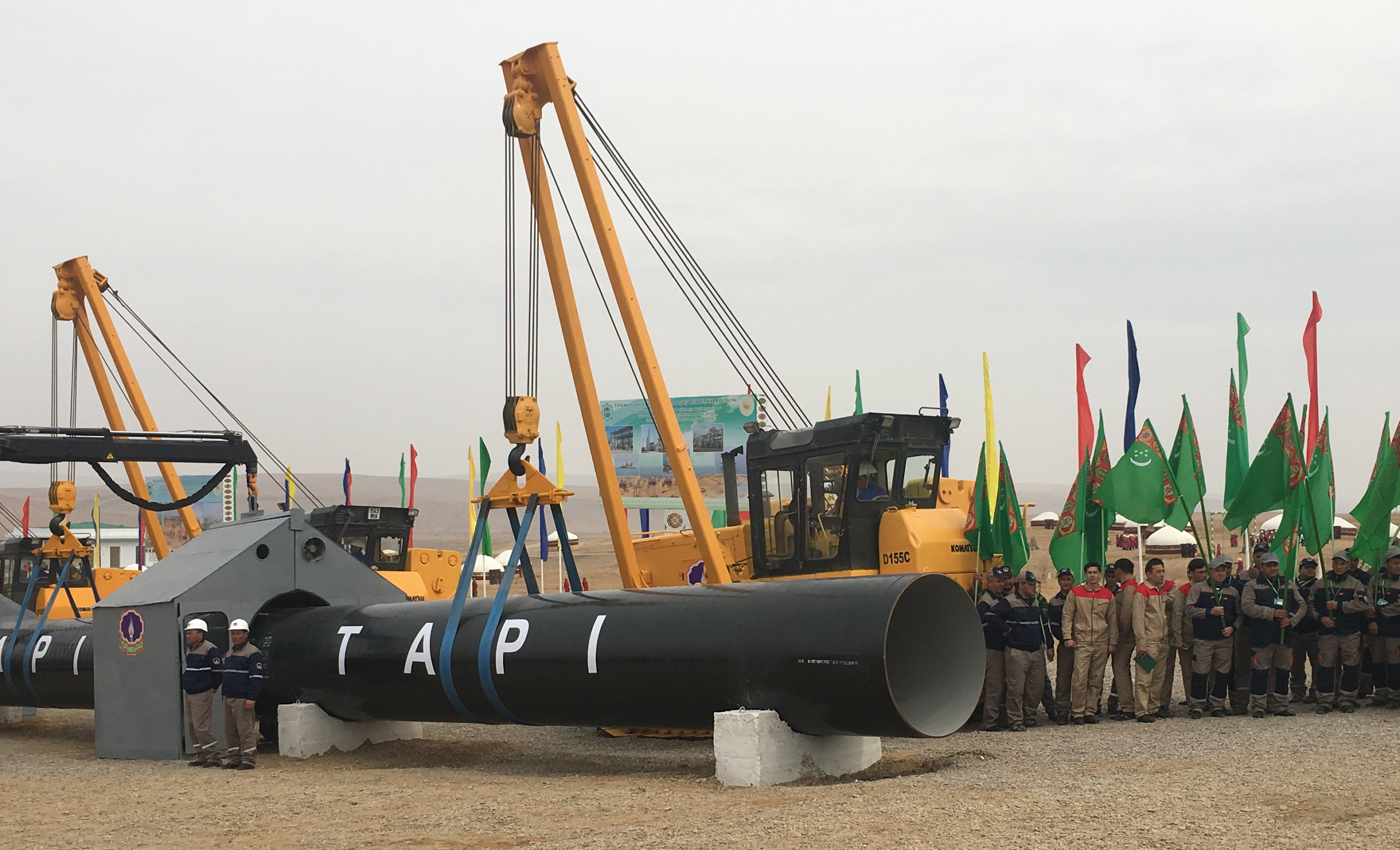
Ceremony on completion of the Turkmen section of the Turkmenistan–Afghanistan–Pakistan–India Pipeline

As of May 2011, the Galkynysh Gas Field was estimated to possess the second-largest volume of gas in the world, after the South Pars field in the Persian Gulf. Reserves at the Galkynysh Gas Field are estimated at 21.2 trillion cubic metres. The Turkmenistan Natural Gas Company (Türkmengaz) controls gas extraction in the country. Gas production is the most dynamic and promising sector of the national economy. In 2009 the government of Turkmenistan began a policy of diversifying export routes for its raw materials.

Prior to 1958, gas production was limited to associated gas from oil wells in western Turkmenistan. In 1958, the first gas wells were drilled at Serhetabat (then Kushky) and at Derweze. Oil and gas fields were discovered in the Central Karakum Desert between 1959 and 1965. In addition to Derweze, these include Takyr, Shyh, Chaljulba, Topjulba, Chemmerli, Atabay, Sakarchage, Atasary, Mydar, Goyun, and Zakli. These fields are located in Jurassic and Cretaceous sediments. The Turkmen gas industry got underway with the opening of the Ojak gas field in 1966. To put this in perspective, associated gas production in Turkmenistan was only 1.157 billion cubic meters in 1965, but by 1970 natural gas production reached 13 billion cubic meters, and by 1989, 90 billion cubic meters. The USSR exported much of this gas to western Europe. Following independence, natural gas extraction fell as Turkmenistan sought export markets but was limited to existing delivery infrastructure under Russian control: Turkmenistan-Russia in two lines (3087 km, originating at Ojak, and another of 2259 km, also originating at Ojak); the Gumdag line (2530 km); and the Shatlyk line (2644 km) to Russia, Ukraine, and the Caucasus. On 1 January 2016, Russia halted natural gas purchases from Turkmenistan after reducing them step by step for the previous years. Russia's Gazprom announced resumption of purchases in April 2019, but reported volumes remained low compared to previous delivery levels.

In 1997, the Korpeje-Gurtguy natural gas pipeline was built to Iran. It is 140 kilometers in length and was the first gas pipeline to a foreign customer constructed after independence. Turkmenistan's exports of natural gas to Iran, estimated at 12 bcma, ended on 1 January 2017, when Turkmengaz unilaterally cut off deliveries, citing payment arrears.

In December 2009, the first line, Line A, of the Trans-Asia pipeline to China opened, creating a second major market for Turkmen natural gas. By 2015 Turkmenistan was delivering up to 35 billion cubic meters per annum (bcma) to China.

China is the largest buyer of gas from Turkmenistan, via three pipelines linking the two countries through Uzbekistan and Kazakhstan. In 2019, China bought over 30bcm of gas from Turkmenistan, making China Turkmenistan's main external source of revenue. In 2023, the Turkmenistan Ministry of Foreign Affairs stated that Turkmenistan's quota on this pipeline system was 40 bcma.

The East–West pipeline was completed in December 2015, with the intent of delivering up to 30 bcm of natural gas to the Caspian shore for eventual export through a yet-to-be-built Trans-Caspian natural gas pipeline connecting the Belek-1 compressor station in Turkmenistan to Azerbaijan.

The Turkmenistan government continues to pursue construction of the Turkmenistan–Afghanistan–Pakistan–India Pipeline, or TAPI. The anticipated cost of the TAPI pipeline is currently estimated at $25 billion. Turkmenistan's section of the pipeline was started in 2015 and was completed in 2019, though the Afghanistan and Pakistan sections remain under construction.

In 2025 most of the worlds largest leaks of methane, a greenhouse gas which causes climate change, were from the country. In 2026, Turkmenistan had responded to about 20% of reported leaks with plans for repairs, and completed eight repairs, which experts called "a genuine breakthrough for climate action."

=== Oil ===
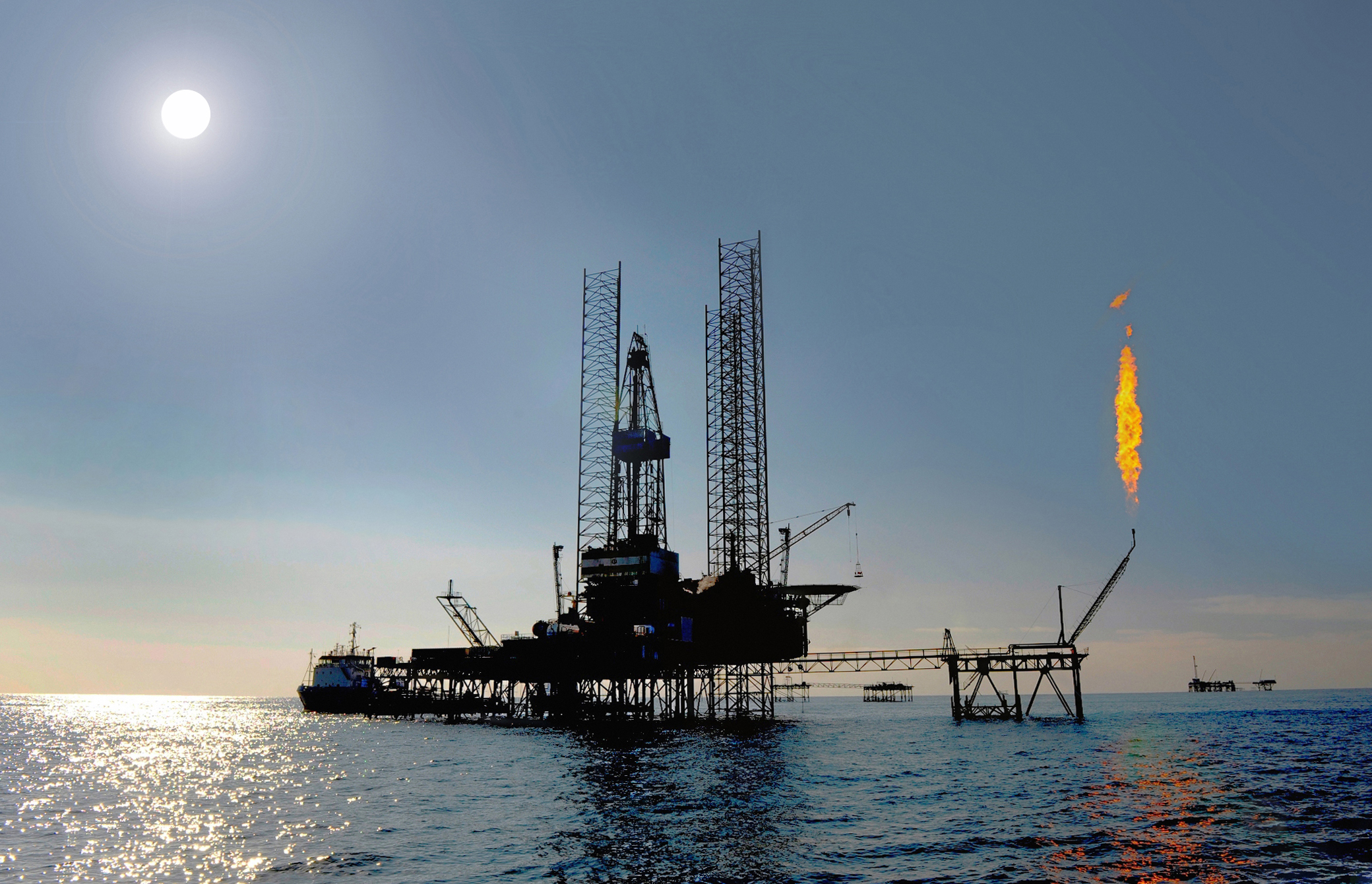
Oil platform of Turkmenistan in the Caspian Sea

Oil was known to exist in western Turkmenistan as early as the 18th century. General Aleksey Kuropatkin reported in 1879 that the Cheleken Peninsula had as many as three thousand oil sources. Turkmen settlers in the 19th century extracted oil near the surface and shipped it to Astrakhan by ship and to Iran by camel caravan. Commercial oil drilling began in the 1890s. The oil extraction industry grew with the exploitation of the fields in Cheleken in 1909 (by Branobel) and in Balkanabat in the 1930s. Production leaped ahead with the discovery of the Gumdag field in 1948 and the Goturdepe field in 1959. By 1940 production had reached two million tons per year, by 1960 over four million tons, and by 1970 over 14 million tons. Oil production in 2019 was 9.8 million tons.

Oil wells are mainly found in the western lowlands. This area also produces associated natural gas. The main oil fields are Cheleken, Gonurdepe, Nebitdag, Gumdag, Barsagelmez, Guyujyk, Gyzylgum, Ordekli, Gogerendag, Gamyshlyja, Ekerem, Chekishler, Keymir, Ekizek, and Bugdayly. Oil is also produced from offshore wells in the Caspian Sea. Most oil is extracted by the Turkmenistan State Company (Concern) Türkmennebit from fields at Goturdepe, Balkanabat, and on the Cheleken Peninsula near the Caspian Sea, which have a combined estimated reserve of 700 million tons. Much of the oil produced in Turkmenistan is refined in the Türkmenbaşy and Seydi refineries. Some oil is exported by tanker vessel across the Caspian Sea en route to Europe via Baku and Makhachkala. Foreign firms involved in offshore oil extraction include Eni S.p.A. of Italy, Dragon Oil of the United Arab Emirates, and Petronas of Malaysia.

On 21 January 2021, the governments of Azerbaijan and Turkmenistan signed a memorandum of understanding to jointly develop an oil field in the Caspian Sea that straddles the nations' border. Known previously as Kyapaz in Azeri and Serdar in Turkmen, the oil field, now called Dostluk ("friendship" in both languages), potentially has reserves of up to 60 million tons of oil as well as associated natural gas.

=== Energy ===
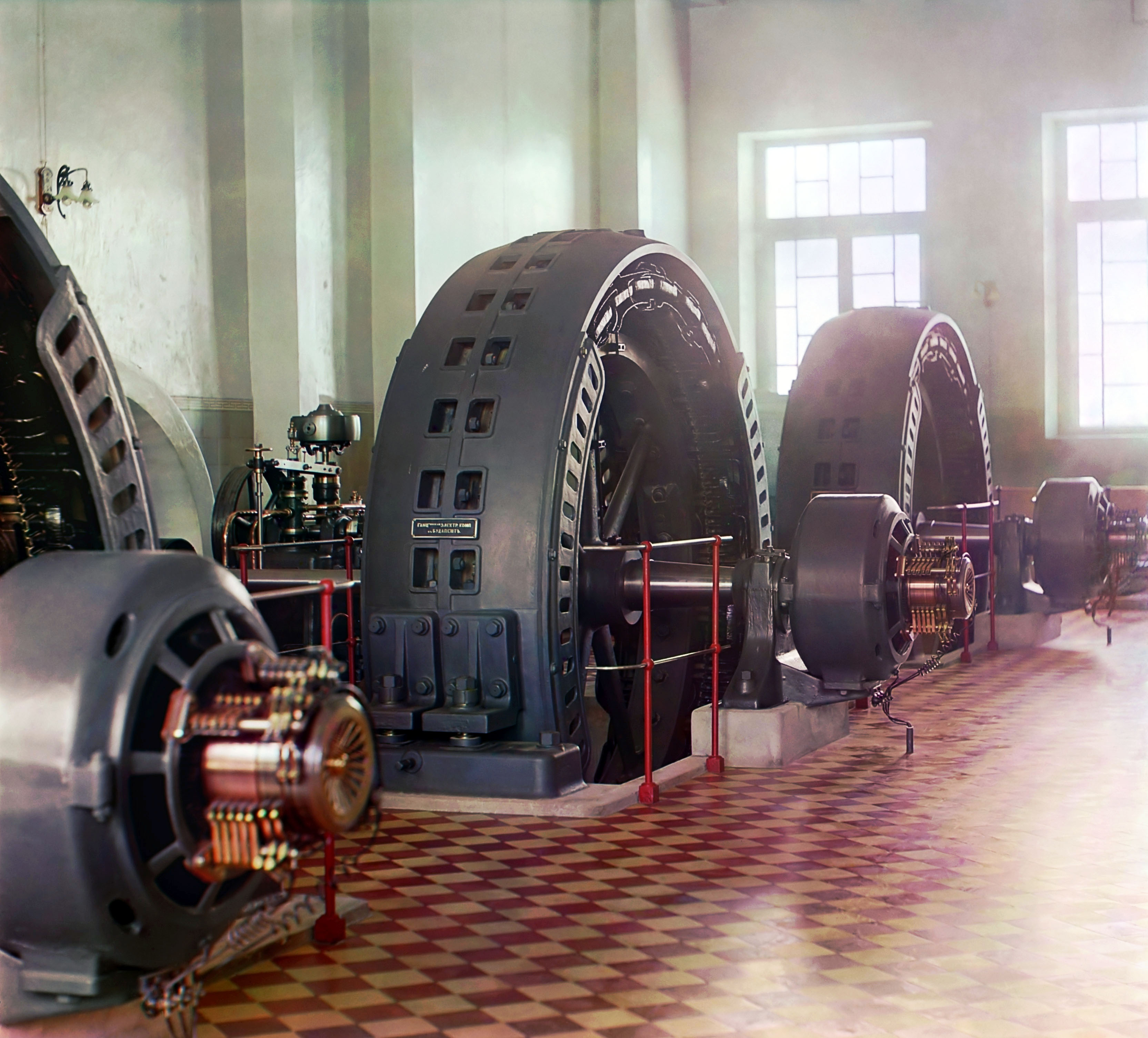
The generators of the Hindukush hydro power plant

Turkmenistan's first electrical power plant was built in 1909 and went into full operation in 1913. As of 2019 it was still in operation. The original triple-turbine Hindukush hydroelectric plant, built by the Austro-Hungarian company Ganz Works on the Murghab River, was designed to produce 1.2 megawatts at 16.5 kilovolts. Until 1957, however, most electrical power in Turkmenistan was produced locally by small diesel generators and diesel-electric locomotives.

In 1957, Soviet authorities created a republic-level directorate for power generation, and in 1966 Turkmenistan entered the first phase of connecting its remote regions to the regional Central Asian electrical grid. By 1979 all rural areas of Turkmenistan were brought on line. Construction of the Mary thermal power plant began in 1969, and by 1987 the eighth and final generator block was completed, bringing the plant to its design capacity of 1.686 gigawatts. In 1998 Turkmenenergo commissioned its first gas-turbine power plant, using GE turbines.

As of 2010, Turkmenistan featured eight major power plants operating on natural gas, in Mary, Ashgabat, Balkanabat, Buzmeyin (suburb of Ashgabat), Dashoguz, Türkmenbaşy, Turkmenabat, and Seydi. As of 2013, Turkmenistan had 10 electrical power plants equipped with 32 turbines, including 14 steam-driven, 15 gas-powered, and 3 hydroelectric. Power output in 2011 was 18.27 billion kWh, of which 2.5 billion kWh was exported. Major power generating installations include the Hindukush Hydroelectric Station, which has a rated capacity of 350 megawatts, and the Mary Thermoelectric Power Station, which has a rated capacity of 1,370 megawatts. In 2018, electrical power production totaled more than 21 billion kilowatt-hours.

Since 2013, additional power plants have been constructed in Mary and Ahal province, and Çärjew District of Lebap province. The Mary-3 combined cycle power plant, built by Çalık Holding with GE turbines, commissioned in 2018, produces 1.574 gigawatts of electrical power and is specifically intended to support expanded exports of electricity to Afghanistan and Pakistan. The Zerger power plant built by Sumitomo, Mitsubishi, Hitachi, and Rönesans Holding in Çärjew District has a design capacity of 432 megawatts from three 144-megawatt gas turbines and was commissioned in September 2021. It is also primarily intended for export of electricity. The Ahal power plant, with capacity of 650 megawatts, was constructed to power the city of Ashgabat and in particular the Olympic Village.

Turkmenistan is a net exporter of electrical power to Central Asian republics and southern neighbors. In 2019, total electrical energy generation in Turkmenistan reportedly totaled 22,521.6 million kilowatt-hours (22.52 terawatt-hours).

=== Agriculture ===
Following independence in 1991, Soviet-era collective- and state farms were converted to "farmers associations" (Turkmen: daýhan birleşigi). Virtually all field crops are irrigated due to the aridity of the climate. The top crop in terms of area planted is wheat (761 thousand hectares in 2019), followed by cotton (551 thousand hectares in 2019).

Turkmenistan is the world's tenth-largest cotton producer. Turkmenistan started producing cotton in the Murghab Valley following conquest of Merv by the Russian Empire in 1884. According to human rights organizations, public sector workers, such as teachers and doctors, are required by the government to pick cotton under the threat of losing their jobs if they refuse.

During the 2020 season, Turkmenistan reportedly produced roughly 1.5 million tons of raw cotton. In 2012, around 7,000 tractors, 5,000 cotton cultivators, 2,200 sewing machines and other machinery, mainly procured from Belarus and the United States, were used. Prior to imposition of a ban on export of raw cotton in October 2018, Turkmenistan exported raw cotton to Russia, Iran, South Korea, United Kingdom, China, Indonesia, Turkey, Ukraine, Singapore and the Baltic states. Beginning in 2019, the Turkmenistan government shifted focus to export of cotton yarn and finished textiles and garments.

=== Tourism ===
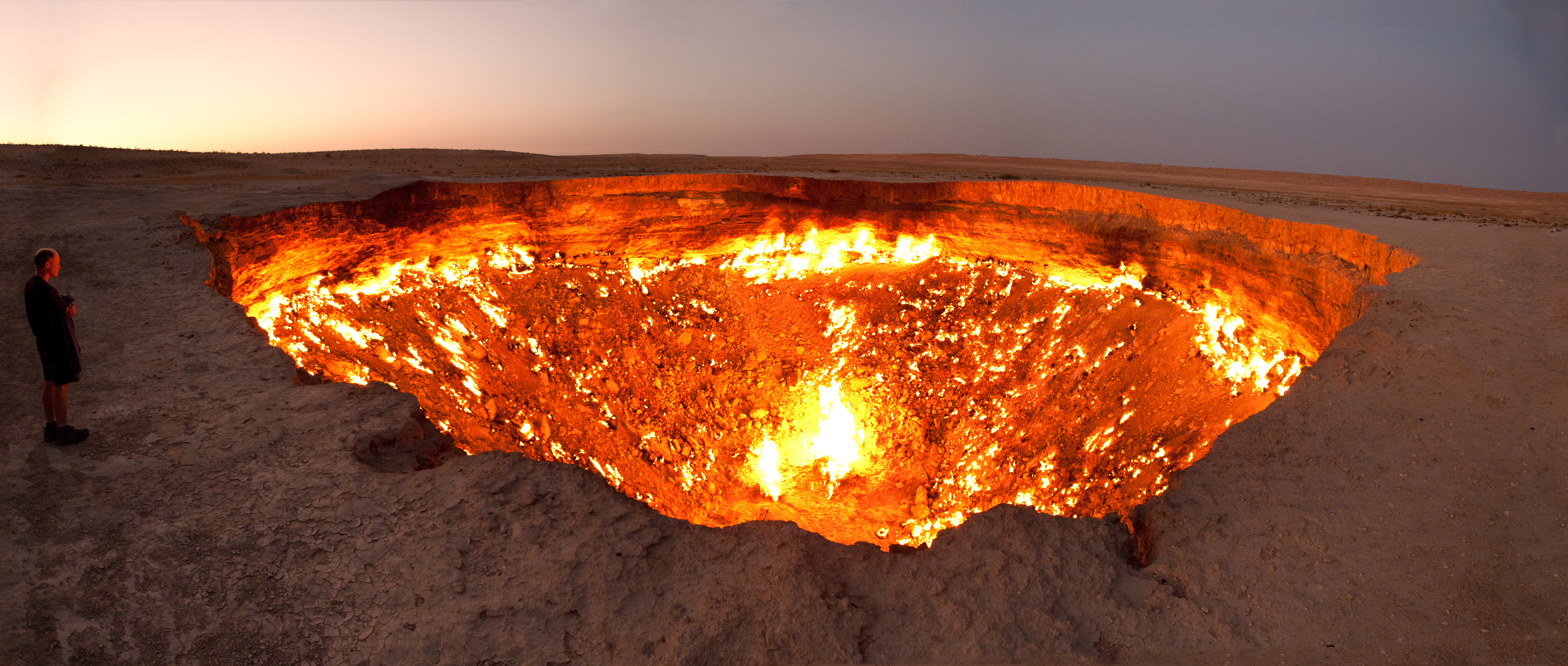
Panorama of the site of the Darvaza gas crater

Turkmenistan reported arrival of 14,438 foreign tourists in 2019. Turkmenistan's international tourism has not grown significantly despite creation of the Awaza tourist zone on the Caspian Sea. Every traveler must obtain a visa before entering Turkmenistan (see Visa policy of Turkmenistan). To obtain a tourist visa, citizens of most countries need visa support from a local travel agency. For tourists visiting Turkmenistan, organized tours exist providing visits to historical sites in and near Daşoguz, Konye-Urgench, Nisa, Ancient Merv, and Mary, as well as beach tours to Avaza and medical tours and holidays in the sanatoria in Mollagara, Bayramaly, Ýylysuw and Archman.

In January 2022 President Gurbanguly Berdimuhamedow ordered that the fire at the Darvaza gas crater, known informally as the country's "Gateway to Hell", and one of Turkmenistan's most popular tourist attractions, should be extinguished for environmental and health reasons, as well as part of efforts to increase gas exports. A possible explanation for the fire is that a Soviet drilling operation in 1971 caused it; however, in 2013 Canadian explorer George Kourounis examined the crater and believed that no one actually knew how it started.

=== Transportation ===
==== Automobile transport ====
Prior to the 1917 Russian Revolution, only three automobiles existed in Turkmenistan, all of them foreign models in Ashgabat. No automobile roads existed between settlements. After the revolution, Soviet authorities graded dirt roads to connect Mary and Kushky (Serhetabat), Tejen and Sarahs, Kyzyl-Arvat (Serdar) with Garrygala (Magtymguly) and Chekishler, i.e., with important border crossings. In 1887–1888 the Gaudan Highway (Russian: Гауданское шоссе) was built between Ashgabat and the Persian border at Gaudan Pass, and Persian authorities extended it to Mashhad, allowing for easier commercial relations. Municipal bus service began in Ashgabat in 1925 with five routes, and taxicab service began in 1938 with five vehicles. The road network was extended in the 1970s with construction of republic-level highways connecting Ashgabat and Kazanjyk (Bereket), Ashgabat and Bayramaly, Nebit Dag (Balkanabat) and Krasnovodsk (Türkmenbaşy), Çärjew (Turkmenabat) and Kerki, and Mary and Kushka (Serhetabat).

The primary west–east motor route is the M37 highway linking the Turkmenbashy International Seaport to the Farap border crossing via Ashgabat, Mary, and Turkmenabat. The primary north–south route is the Ashgabat-Dashoguz Automobile Road (Turkmen: Aşgabat-Daşoguz awtomobil ýoly), built in the 2000s. Major international routes include European route E003, European route E60, European route E121, and Asian Highway (AH) routes AH5, AH70, AH75, AH77, and AH78.

A new toll motorway is under construction between Ashgabat and Turkmenabat by the Turkmen Awtoban company, which will construct the 600-km highway in three phases: Ashgabat-Tejen by December 2020, Tejen-Mary by December 2022 and Mary-Turkmenabat by December 2023. A sister project to link Türkmenbaşy and Ashgabat was suspended when the Turkish contractor Polimeks walked away from the project, reportedly because of non-payment.

As of 29 January 2019, the Turkmen Automobile Roads state concern (Turkmen: Türkmenawtoýollary) was subordinated by presidential decree to the Ministry of Construction and Architecture, and responsibility for road construction and maintenance was shifted to provincial and municipal governments. Operation of motor coaches (buses) and taxicabs is the responsibility of the Automobile Services Agency (Turkmen: Türkmenawtoulaglary Agentligi) of the Ministry of Industry and Communication.

==== Air transport ====
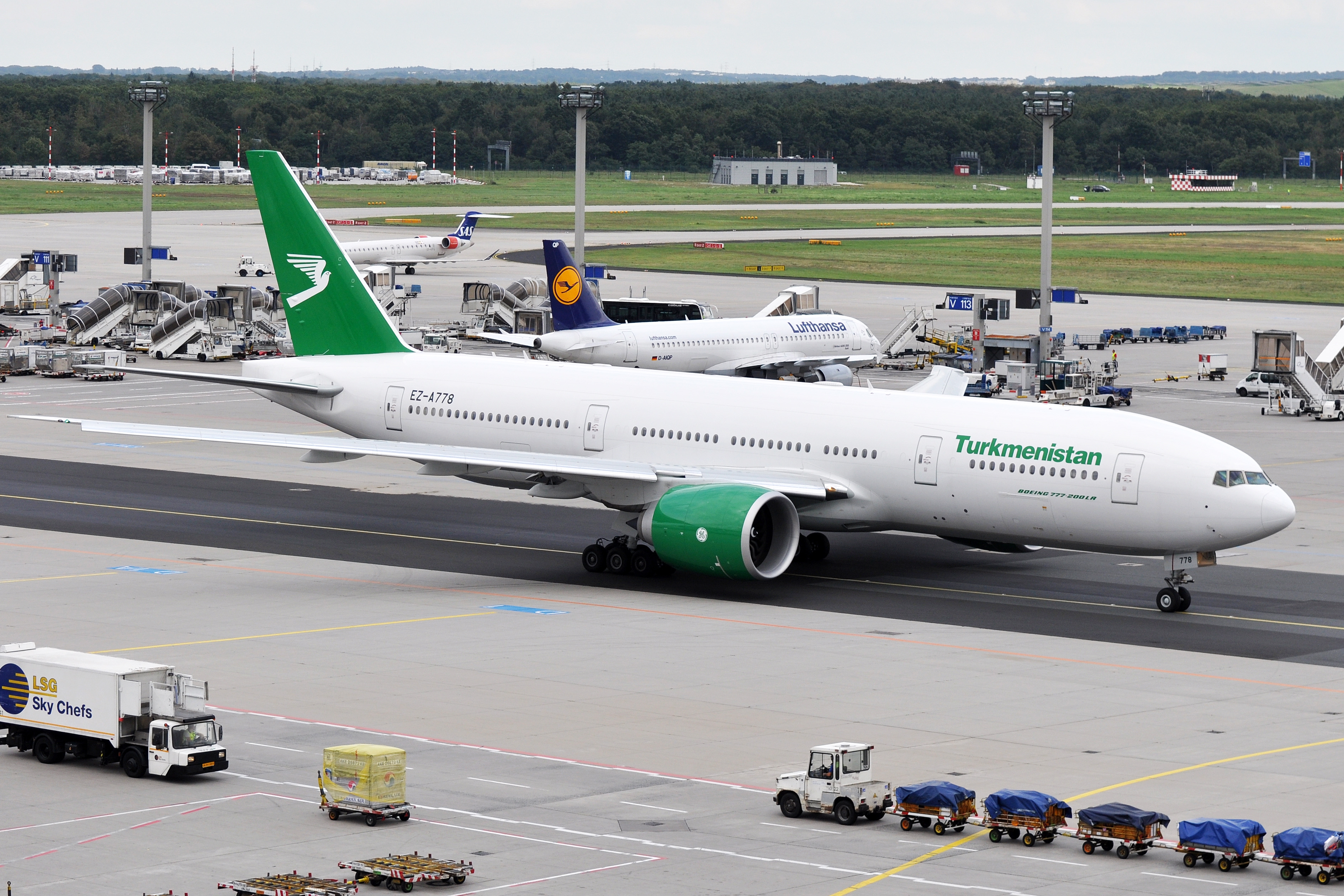
Turkmenistan Airlines Boeing 777-200LR

Air service began in 1927 with a route between Çärjew (Turkmenabat) and Tashauz (Dashoguz), flying German Junkers 13 and Soviet K-4 aircraft, each capable of carrying four passengers. In 1932 an aerodrome was built in Ashgabat on the site of the current Howdan neighborhoods, for both passenger and freight service, the latter mainly to deliver supplies to sulfur mines near Derweze in the Karakum Desert.

Airports serving the major cities of Ashgabat, Dashoguz, Mary, Turkmenabat, and Türkmenbaşy, which are operated by Turkmenistan's civil aviation authority's airline, Türkmenhowaýollary, feature scheduled domestic commercial air service. Under normal circumstances international scheduled commercial air service is limited to Ashgabat. During the COVID-19 pandemic, however, international flights take off from and land at Turkmenabat, where quarantine facilities have been established.

State-owned Turkmenistan Airlines is the only Turkmen air carrier. Turkmenistan Airlines' passenger fleet is composed of Boeing and Bombardier Aerospace aircraft. Air transport carries more than two thousand passengers daily in the country. Under normal conditions, international flights annually transport over half a million people into and out of Turkmenistan, and Turkmenistan Air operates regular flights to Moscow, London, Frankfurt, Birmingham, Bangkok, Delhi, Abu Dhabi, Amritsar, Kyiv, Lviv, Beijing, Istanbul, Minsk, Almaty, Tashkent, and St. Petersburg.

Small airfields serve industrial sites near other cities, but do not feature scheduled commercial passenger service. Airfields slated for modernization and expansion include those serving Garabogaz, Jebel, and Galaýmor. The new Turkmenabat International Airport was commissioned in February 2018. In June 2021, an international airport was opened in Kerki.

==== Maritime transport ====
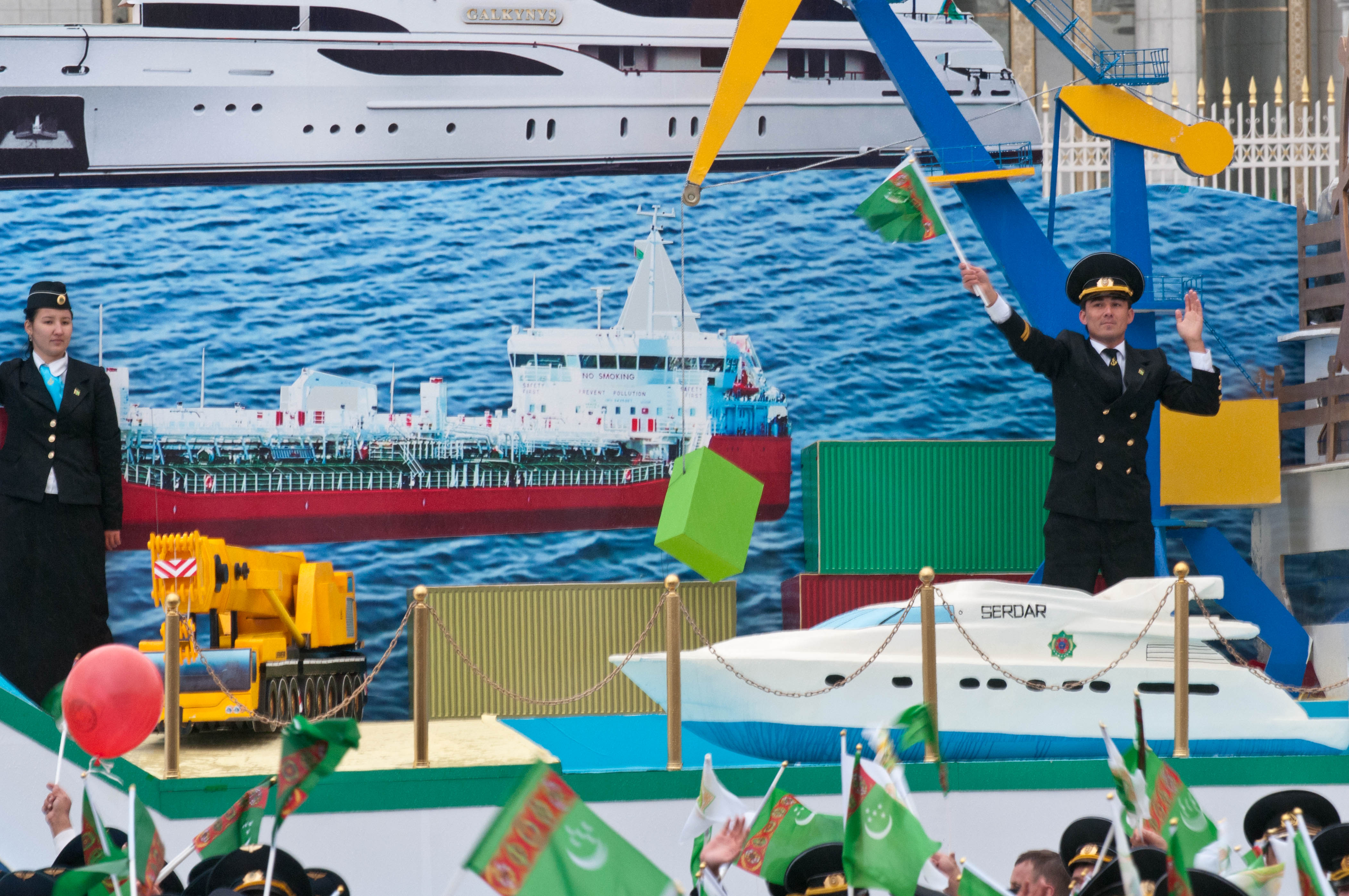
Workers in the service of Maritime and River Transport of Turkmenistan

Since 1962, the Turkmenbashy International Seaport has operated a passenger ferry to the port of Baku, Azerbaijan as well as rail ferries to other ports on the Caspian Sea (Baku, Aktau). In recent years tanker transport of oil to the ports of Baku and Makhachkala has increased.

In May 2018, construction was completed of a major expansion of the Turkmenbashy seaport. Cost of the project was $1.5 billion. The general contractor for the project was Gap Inşaat, a subsidiary of Çalık Holding of Turkey. The expansion added 17 million tons of annual capacity, making total throughput including previously existing facilities of over 25 million tons per year. The international ferry and passenger terminals will be able to serve 300,000 passengers and 75,000 vehicles per year, and the container terminal is designed to handle 400,000 TEU (20-foot container equivalent) per year.

==== Railway transport ====
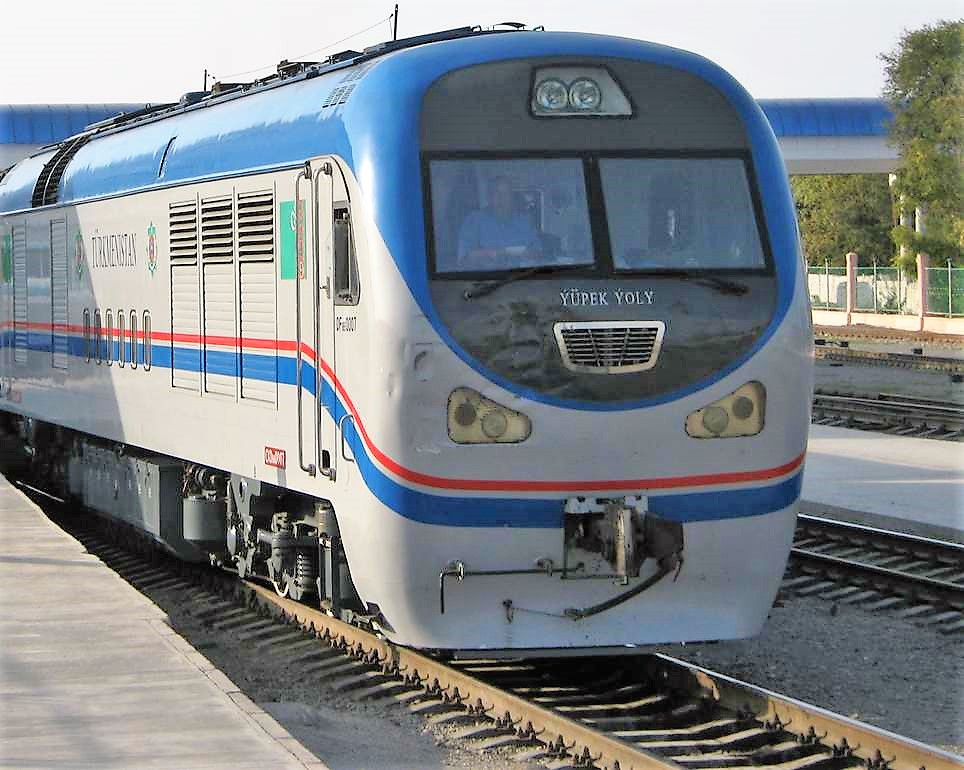
Turkmen diesel locomotive

The first rail line in Turkmenistan was built in 1880, from the eastern shore of the Caspian Sea to Mollagara. By October 1881 the line was extended to Kyzyl-Arvat, by 1886 had reached Çärjew. In 1887 a wooden rail bridge was built over the Amu Darya, and the line was continued to Samarkand (1888) and Tashkent (1898). Rail service in Turkmenistan began as part of Imperial Russia's Trans-Caspian Railway, then of the Central Asian Railway. After the dissolution of the Soviet Union, the railway network in Turkmenistan was transferred to and operated by the state-owned Türkmendemirýollary. The rail gauge is the same as the Russian (and former Soviet) one-1520 millimeters.

The total length of railways is 3181 km. Only domestic passenger service is available, except for special trains operated by tour operators. The railway carries approximately 5.5 million passengers and moves nearly 24 million tons of freight per year.

Turkmen Railways is currently constructing a rail line in Afghanistan to connect Serhetabat to Herat. Upon completion, it may connect to the proposed rail line to connect Herat to Khaf, Iran.

== Demographics ==
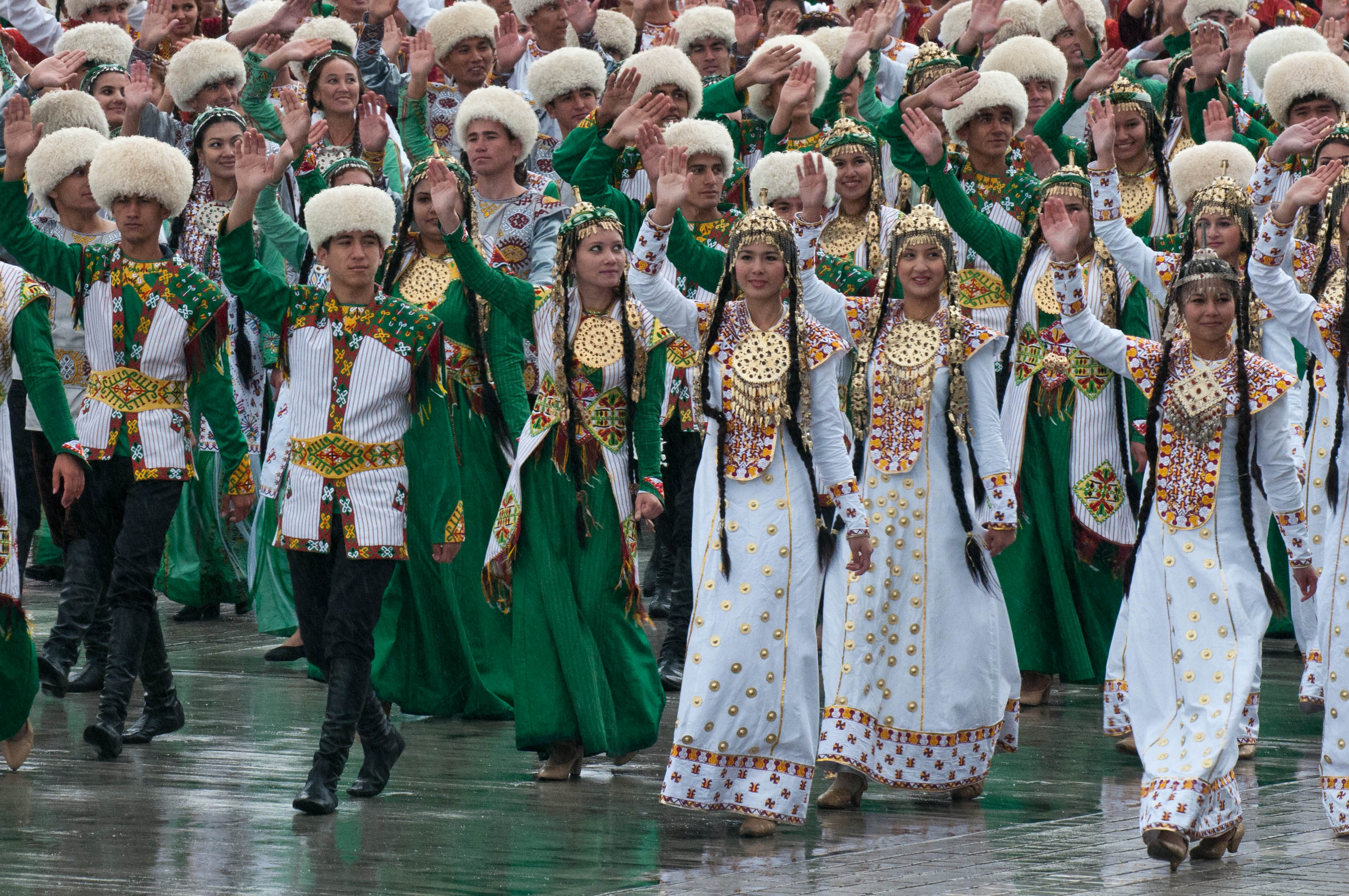
Turkmens in folk costume at the 20th Independence Day parade, 2011

The last census to be published in full was held in 1995. Detailed results of every census since then have been kept secret, although a total figure for the 2022 census was released. Available figures indicate that most of Turkmenistan's citizens are ethnic Turkmens with sizeable minorities of Uzbeks and Russians. Smaller minorities include Kazakhs, Tatars, Ukrainians, Kurds (native to the Kopet Dagh mountains), Armenians, Azeris, Balochs and Pashtuns. The percentage of ethnic Russians in Turkmenistan dropped from 18.6% in 1939 to 9.5% in 1989. The CIA World Factbook estimated the ethnic composition of Turkmenistan in 2003 as 85% Turkmen, 5% Uzbek, 4% Russian and 6% other. According to official data announced in Ashgabat in February 2001, 91% of the population were Turkmen, 3% were Uzbeks and 2% were Russians. Between 1989 and 2001 the number of Turkmen in Turkmenistan doubled (from 2.5 to 4.9 million), while the number of Russians dropped by two-thirds (from 334,000 to slightly over 100,000). As of 2021, the number of Russians in Turkmenistan was estimated at 100,000. Opposition media reported that some results of the 2012 census had been surreptitiously released, including a total population number of 4,751,120. According to this source, as of 2012 85.6% of the population was ethnically Turkmen, followed by 5.8% ethnic Uzbek and 5.1% ethnic Russian. In contrast, an official Turkmen delegation reported to the UN in January 2015 some different figures on national minorities, including slightly under 9% ethnic Uzbek, 2.2% ethnic Russian, and 0.4% ethnic Kazakh. The 2012 census reportedly counted 58 different nationalities.

Official population estimates are likely too high, given known emigration trends. Population growth has been offset by emigration in search of permanent employment. In July 2021 opposition media reported, based on three independent anonymous sources, that the population of Turkmenistan was between 2.7 and 2.8 million.

A once-in-a-decade national census was conducted 17–27 December 2022. Opposition media reported that many people claimed not to have been interviewed by census workers, or that census workers merely telephoned respondents, and did not visit them to count residents. According to the official results of the 2022 census published in July 2023, the population of Turkmenistan was 7,057,841. However, offshore media disputed that figure, with one source claiming it came out of "thin air".

=== Largest cities ===
Largest cities or towns in Turkmenistan List of cities in Turkmenistan
Rank	Name	Province	Pop.
1	Ashgabat	Capital	947,221
2	Türkmenabat	Lebap	279,765
3	Daşoguz	Daşoguz	245,872
4	Mary	Mary	126,141
5	Serdar	Balkan	93,692
6	Baýramaly	Mary	91,713
7	Balkanabat	Balkan	90,149
8	Tejen	Ahal	79,324
9	Türkmenbaşy	Balkan	73,803
10	Magdanly	Lebap	68,133

=== Turkmen tribes ===
The tribal nature of Turkmen society is well documented. The major modern Turkmen tribes are Teke, Yomut, Ersari, Chowdur, Gokleng and Saryk. The most numerous are the Teke.

=== Migration ===
Based on data from receiving countries, MeteoZhurnal estimated that at least 102,346 Turkmenistani citizens emigrated abroad in 2019, 78% of them to Turkey, and 24,206 apparently returned home, for net migration of 77,014. According to leaked results of a 2018 survey, between 2008 and 2018 1,879,413 Turkmenistani citizens emigrated permanently out of an estimated base population of 5.4 million. Deputy Foreign Minister Vepa Hajiyev stated publicly in August 2023 that in 2022 267,330 Turkmenistan citizens had traveled abroad, but without indicating either how many of these had emigrated or how many had returned.

=== Languages ===
Turkmen is the official language of Turkmenistan (per the 1992 Constitution), a language that shares to some degree mutual intelligibility with Azerbaijani and Turkish. Since the late 20th century, the government of Turkmenistan has taken steps to distance itself from the Russian language (which has been seen as a soft power tool for Russian interests). The first step in this campaign was the shift to the Latin alphabet in 1993, and Russian lost its status as the language of inter-ethnic communication in 1996. As of 1999, Turkmen was spoken by 72% of the population, Russian by 12% (349,000), Uzbek by 9% (317,000), and other languages by 7% (Kazakh (88,000), Tatar (40,400), Ukrainian (37,118), Azerbaijani (33,000), Armenian (32,000), Northern Kurdish (20,000), Lezgian (10,400), Persian (8,000), Belarusian (5,290), Erzya (3,490), Korean (3,490), Bashkir (2,610), Karakalpak (2,540), Ossetic (1,890), Dargwa (1,600), Lak (1,590), Tajik (1,280), Georgian (1,050), Lithuanian (224), Tabasaran (180), and Dungan).

=== Religion ===
Religion in Turkmenistan (ARDA 2020 est.)
1. Sunni (93.7%)
2. Shia (1.10%)
3. Orthodox (0.81%)
4. Other Christian (0.44%)
5. None (3.90%)
6. Other (0.06%)

Ashgabat Mosque, 2013

According to The World Factbook, Muslims constitute 93% of the population while 6% of the population are followers of the Eastern Orthodox Church and the remaining 1% religion is reported as non-religious. According to a 2009 Pew Research Center report, 93.1% of Turkmenistan's population is Muslim.

The first migrants were sent as missionaries and often were adopted as patriarchs of particular clans or tribal groups, thereby becoming their "founders." Reformulation of communal identity around such figures accounts for one of the highly localized developments of Islamic practice in Turkmenistan.

In the Soviet era, all religious beliefs were attacked by the communist authorities as superstition and "vestiges of the past." Most religious schooling and religious observance were banned, and the vast majority of mosques were closed. However, since 1990, efforts have been made to regain some of the cultural heritage lost under Soviet rule.

Former president Saparmurat Niyazov ordered that basic Islamic principles be taught in public schools. More religious institutions, including religious schools and mosques, have appeared, many with the support of Saudi Arabia, Kuwait, and Turkey. Under Niyazov, religious classes were held in both schools and mosques, with instruction in Arabic language, the Qur'an and the hadith, and history of Islam. At present, the only educational institution teaching religion is the theological faculty of Turkmen State University.

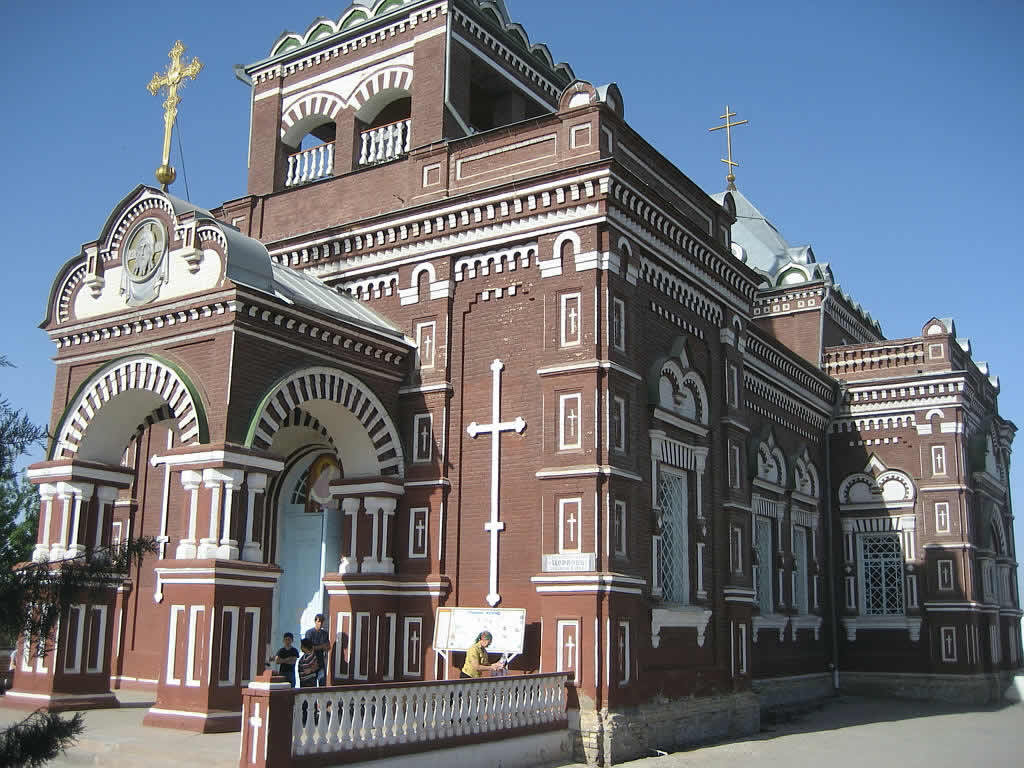
Russian Orthodox church in Mary

President Niyazov wrote his own religious text, published in separate volumes in 2001 and 2004, entitled the Ruhnama ("Book of the Soul"). The Turkmenbashy regime required that the book, which formed the basis of the educational system in Turkmenistan, be given equal status with the Quran (mosques were required to display the two books side by side). The book was heavily promoted as part of the former president's personality cult, and knowledge of the Ruhnama was required even for obtaining a driver's license. Quotations from the Ruhnama are inscribed on the walls of the Türkmenbaşy Ruhy Mosque, which many Muslims consider sacrilegious.

Most Christians in Turkmenistan belong to Eastern Orthodoxy (about 5% of the population). There are 12 Russian Orthodox churches in Turkmenistan, four of which are in Ashgabat. An archpriest resident in Ashgabat leads the Orthodox Church within the country. Until 2007 Turkmenistan fell under the religious jurisdiction of the Russian Orthodox archbishop in Tashkent, Uzbekistan, but since then has been subordinate to the Archbishop of Pyatigorsk and Cherkessia. There are no Russian Orthodox seminaries in Turkmenistan.

There are also small communities of the following denominations: the Armenian Apostolic Church, the Roman Catholic Church, Pentecostal Christians, the Protestant Word of Life Church, the Greater Grace World Outreach Church, the New Apostolic Church, Jehovah's Witnesses, Jews, and several unaffiliated, nondenominational evangelical Christian groups. In addition, there are small communities of Baháʼís, Baptists, Seventh-day Adventists, and Hare Krishnas.

The history of Baháʼí Faith in Turkmenistan is as old as the religion itself, and Baháʼí communities still exist today. The first Baháʼí House of Worship was built in Ashgabat at the beginning of the twentieth century. It was seized by the Soviets in the 1920s and converted to an art gallery. It was heavily damaged in the earthquake of 1948 and later demolished. The site was converted to a public park.

The Russian Academy of Sciences has identified many instances of syncretic influence of pre-Islamic Turkic belief systems on practice of Islam among Turkmen.

=== Education ===
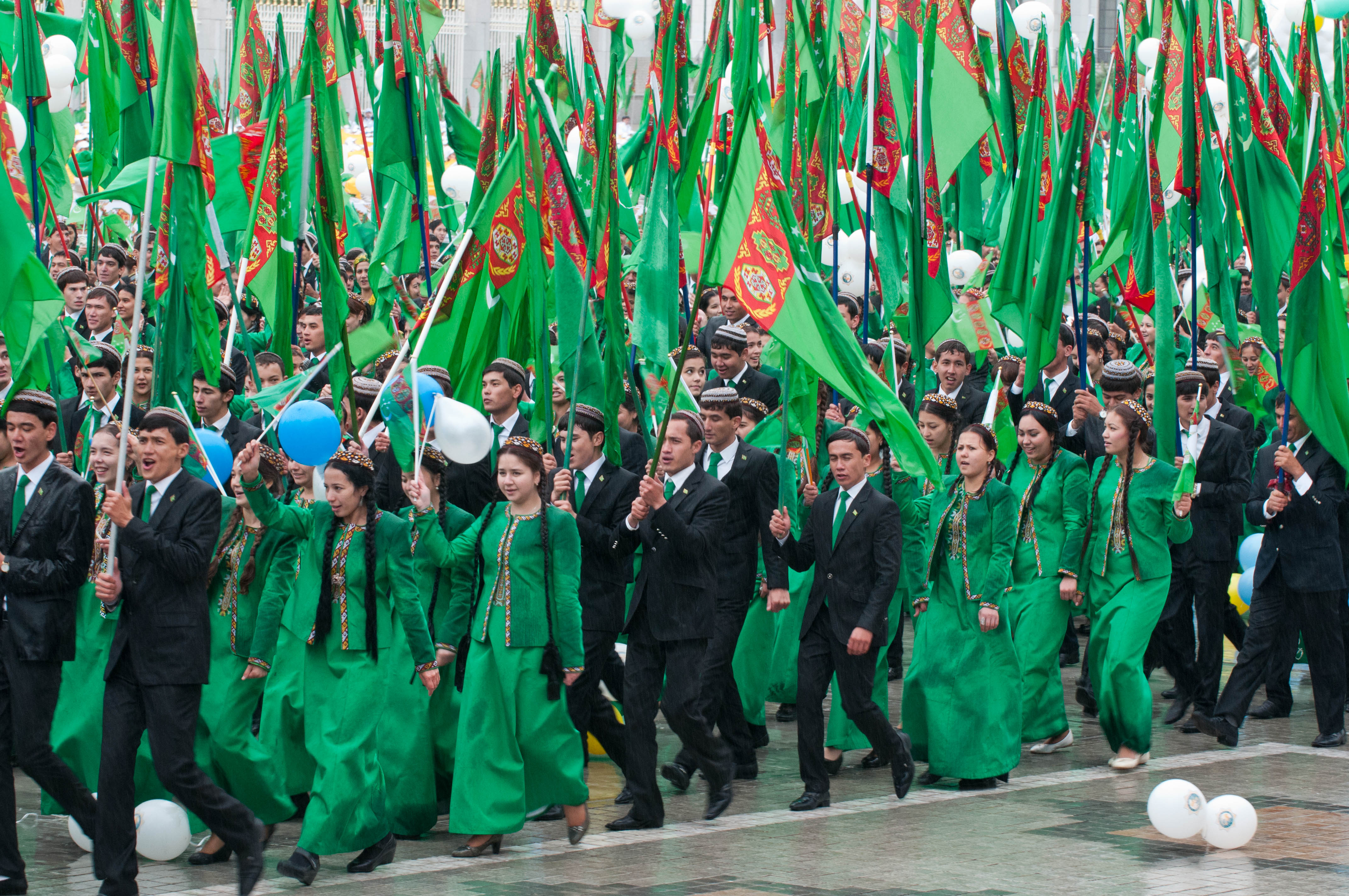
Turkmeni students in university uniform

Education is universal and mandatory through the secondary level. Under former President Niyazov, the total duration of primary and secondary education was reduced from 10 to 9 years. President Berdimuhamedov restored 10-year education as of the 2007–2008 school year. Effective 2013, general education in Turkmenistan was expanded to three-stages lasting 12 years: elementary school (grades 1–3), high school – the first cycle of secondary education with duration of 5 years (grades 4–8), and secondary school (grades 9–12).

At the end of the 2019–20 academic year, nearly 80,000 Turkmen pupils graduated from high school. As of the 2019–20 academic year, 12,242 of these students were admitted to institutions of higher education in Turkmenistan. An additional 9,063 were admitted to the country's 42 vocational colleges. An estimated 95,000 Turkmen students were enrolled in institutions of higher education abroad as of Autumn 2019.

== Culture ==
The Turkmen people have traditionally been nomads and equestrians; even today after the fall of the USSR, attempts to urbanize the Turkmens have not been very successful. They never really formed a coherent nation or ethnic group until they were forged into one by Joseph Stalin in the 1930s. Turkmen are divided into clans, and each clan has its own dialect and style of dress. Turkmens are famous for making knotted Turkmen carpets, often mistakenly called Bukhara rugs in the West. These are elaborate and colorful hand-knotted carpets, which help indicate the distinctions among the various Turkmen clans. Ethnic groups throughout the region build yurts, circular houses with dome roofs, made of a wooden frame covered in felt from the hides of sheep or other livestock. Horses play a vital role in various recreational pursuits across the region, from the horse racing to horseback fighting, where skilled riders attempt to unseat their opponents.

Turkmen men wear traditional telpek or "mekan telpek" hats, which are large black or white sheepskin hats. Traditional dress for men consists of these high, shaggy sheepskin hats and red robes over white shirts. Women wear long sack-dresses over narrow trousers (the pants are trimmed with a band of embroidery at the ankle). Female headdresses usually consist of silver jewelry. Bracelets and brooches are set with semi-precious stones.

=== Holidays ===
Holidays in Turkmenistan are laid out in the Constitution of Turkmenistan. Holidays in Turkmenistan practiced internationally include New Year's Day, Nowruz, Eid al-Fitr, and Eid al-Adha. Turkmenistan exclusive holidays include Melon Day, Turkmen Woman's Day, and the Day of Remembrance for Saparmurat Niyazov.

=== Architecture ===
The capital city of Ashgabat is the center of Turkmenistan's new post-soviet architecture. In the early 2000s the government of Turkmenistan began to rebuild the city of Ashgabat in a style partially inspired by Soviet Architecture, emphasizing grandiosity. The city was rebuilt with a standardized design of white marble. In fact, the city has the most white marble covered buildings of any city in the world, over 543. Much of the city's design has been because of former President Berdimuhamedow's ambition to break numerous obscure world records. This includes the white marble buildings, but also is the cause behind the design of Alem Entertainment Center, which features the world's largest enclosed Ferris wheel. Also notable is the Wedding Palace, an ornate gold and white building topped by a massive globe.

=== Mass media ===
Newspapers and monthly magazines are published by state-controlled media outlets, primarily in Turkmen. The daily official newspaper is published in both Turkmen (Türkmenistan) and Russian (Нейтральный Туркменистан). Two online news portals repeat official content, Turkmenportal and Parahat.info, in addition to the official "Golden Age" (Turkmen: Altyn Asyr, Russian: Золотой век) news website, which is available in Turkmen, Russian, and English. Two Ashgabat-based private news organizations, Infoabad and Arzuw, offer online content.

Articles published by the state-controlled newspapers are heavily censored and written to glorify the state and its leader. Uncensored press coverage specific to Turkmenistan is provided only by news organizations located outside Turkmenistan: Azatlyk Radiosy, the Turkmen service of Radio Free Europe/Radio Liberty based in Prague; Chronicles of Turkmenistan, the Vienna-based outlet of the Turkmen Initiative for Human Rights; Turkmen.news, previously known as Alternative News of Turkmenistan, based in the Netherlands; and Gündogar. In addition, Mediazona Central Asia, Eurasianet and Central Asia News provide some reporting on events in Turkmenistan.

Turkmenistan currently broadcasts eight national TV channels via satellite. They are Altyn Asyr, Ýaşlyk, Miras, Turkmenistan (in seven languages), Türkmen Owazy (music), Aşgabat, Turkmenistan Sport and Arkadag. There are no commercial or private TV stations. The nightly official news broadcast, Watan (Homeland), is available on YouTube.

External videos
- Example of Turkmenistan TV News
- Turkmen President celebrates Independence Day

Although officially banned, widespread use of satellite dish receivers allows access to foreign programming, particularly outside Ashgabat. Due to the high mutual intelligibility of the Turkmen and Turkish languages, Turkish-language programs have grown in popularity despite official efforts to discourage viewership.

Turkmenistan's internet services are the least developed in Central Asia. Access to Internet services is provided by the government's ISP company, Turkmentelekom. As of 27 January 2021, Turkmenistan reported an estimated 1,265,794 internet users, or roughly 21% of the total population.

=== Sports ===
The most popular sport in Turkmenistan is football. The national team has never qualified for the FIFA World Cup. However, the team has appeared twice at the AFC Asian Cup, in 2004 and 2019; they failed to advance past the group stage in both editions. Another popular sport is archery; Turkmenistan holds league and local competitions for archery. International sports events hosted in Turkmenistan include; the 2017 Asian Indoor and Martial Arts Games and the 2018 World Weightlifting Championships.

== See also ==
- Outline of Turkmenistan
