= Outline of Turkmenistan =

Landlocked country in Central Asia

The Flag of Turkmenistan

The Emblem of Turkmenistan

The location of Turkmenistan

An enlargeable map of Turkmenistan

The following outline is provided as an overview of and topical guide to Turkmenistan:

Turkmenistan is a sovereign Turkic country located in Central Asia. The name Turkmenistan is derived from Persian, meaning "land of the Turkmen". The name of its capital, Ashgabat, derived from Persian as well, loosely translating as "the city of love". Until 1991, it was a constituent republic of the Soviet Union, the Turkmen Soviet Socialist Republic. It is bordered by Afghanistan to the southeast, Iran to the southwest, Uzbekistan to the northeast, Kazakhstan to the northwest, and the Caspian Sea to the west.

Although it is wealthy in natural resources in certain areas, most of the country is covered by the Karakum (Black Sands) Desert. It has a one-party system, though other parties exist. The country was ruled by President for Life Saparmurat Niyazov until his death on 21 December 2006. Presidential elections were held on 11 February 2007. Gurbanguly Berdimuhammedow was declared the winner with 89% of the vote. He was sworn in on 14 February 2007, and has been re-elected twice since, in 2012 and 2017.

== General reference ==
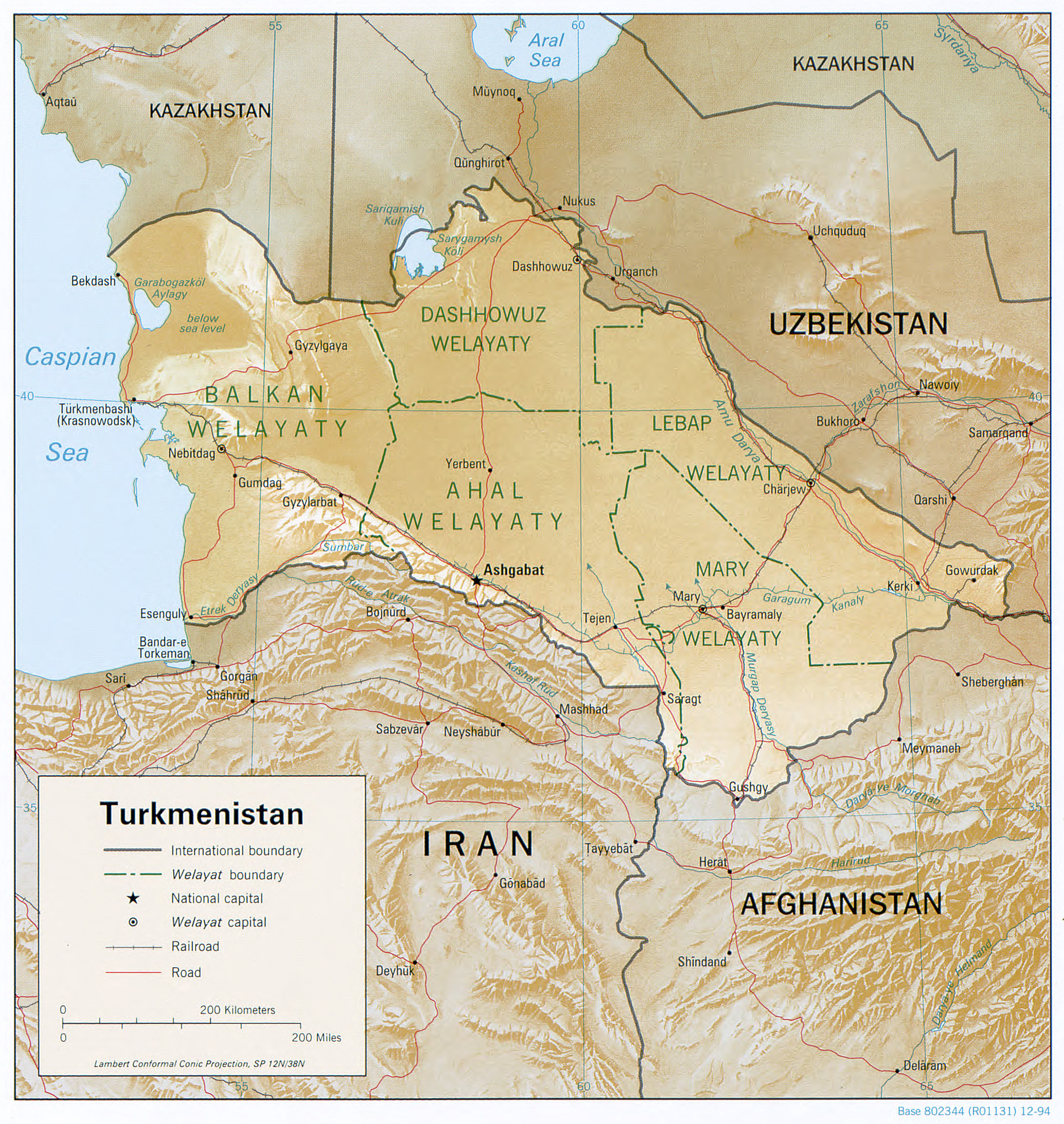
An enlargeable relief map of Turkmenistan

- Pronunciation:
- Common English country name: Turkmenistan
- Official English country name: Turkmenistan
- Common endonym(s): Türkmenistan
- Official endonym(s): Türkmenistan
- Adjectival(s): Turkmen
- Demonym(s):
- International rankings of Turkmenistan
- ISO country codes: TM, TKM, 795
- ISO region codes: See ISO 3166-2:TM
- Internet country code top-level domain: .tm

== Geography of Turkmenistan ==
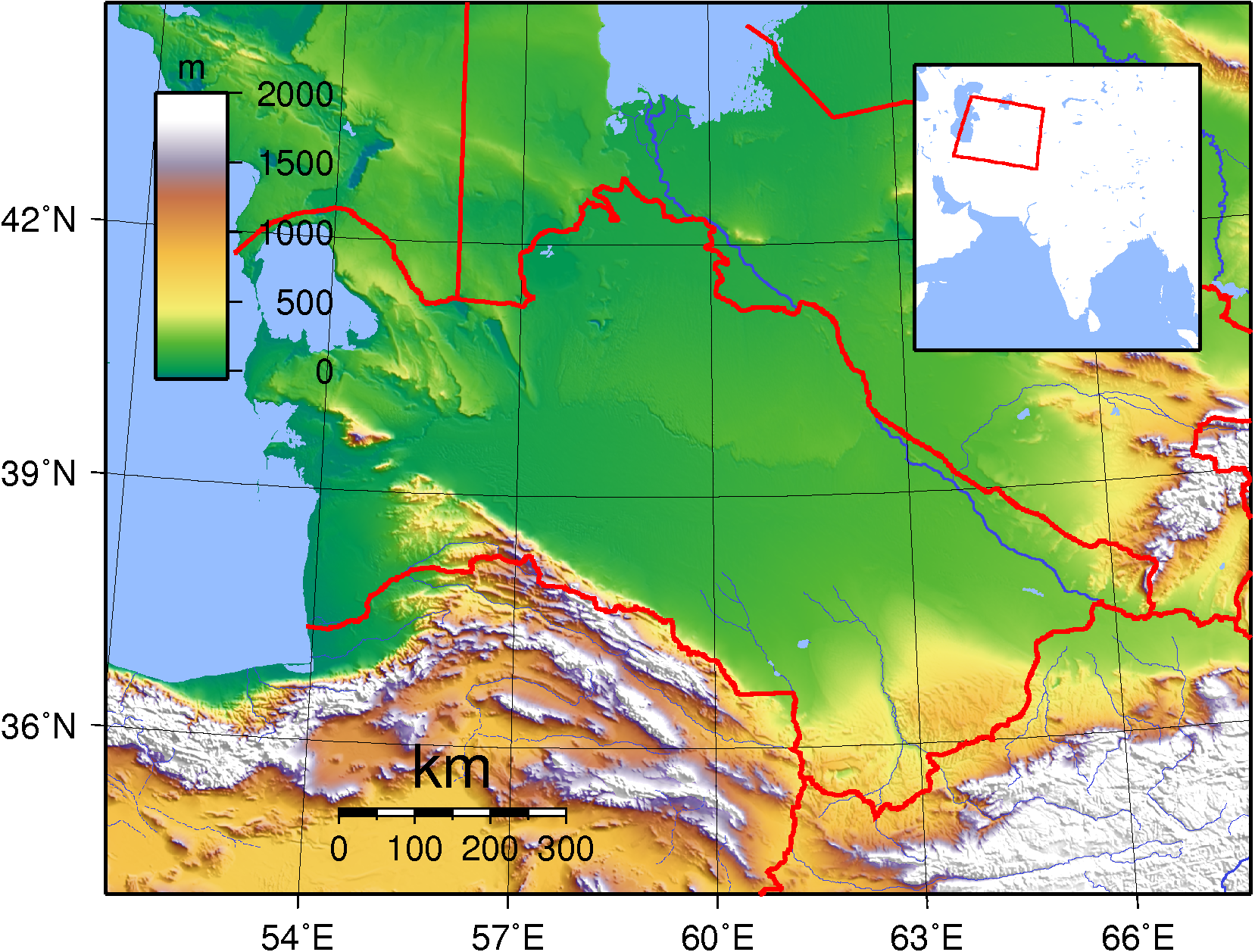
An enlargeable topographic map of Turkmenistan

- Turkmenistan is: a landlocked country
- Location:
  - Northern Hemisphere and Eastern Hemisphere
  - Eurasia
    - Asia
      - Central Asia
  - Time zone: UTC+05
  - Extreme points of Turkmenistan
    - High: Aýrybaba 3,139 m (10,299 ft)
    - Low: Akjagaýa çöketligi −81 m (−266 ft)
  - Land boundaries: 3,736 km

Uzbekistan 1,621 km
Iran 992 km
Afghanistan 744 km
Kazakhstan 379 km

- Coastline: none

- Population of Turkmenistan: 5,240,000 (July 2013, UN estimate) – 117th most populous country
- Area of Turkmenistan: 488,100 km^{2} – 53rd by total area
- Atlas of Turkmenistan

=== Environment of Turkmenistan ===
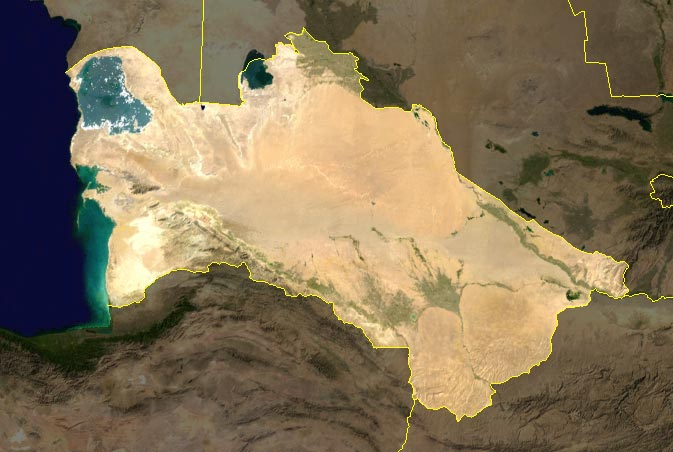
An enlargeable satellite image of Turkmenistan

Environment of Turkmenistan

- Climate of Turkmenistan
- Environmental issues in Turkmenistan
- Protected areas of Turkmenistan
- Wildlife of Turkmenistan
  - Fauna of Turkmenistan
    - Birds of Turkmenistan
    - Mammals of Turkmenistan

==== Natural geographic features of Turkmenistan ====
- Glaciers of Turkmenistan: None
- Islands of Turkmenistan: None
- Lakes of Turkmenistan
- Mountains of Turkmenistan
  - Volcanoes in Turkmenistan: None
- Rivers of Turkmenistan
- List of World Heritage Sites in Turkmenistan

=== Regions of Turkmenistan ===
Regions of Turkmenistan

==== Administrative divisions of Turkmenistan ====
Administrative divisions of Turkmenistan

- Provinces of Turkmenistan
  - Districts of Turkmenistan

Provinces of Turkmenistan

- Aşgabat
- Ahal Province
- Balkan Province
- Daşoguz Province
- Lebap Province
- Mary Province

The provinces of Turkmenistan are divided into districts, which may be either counties or cities.

=== Demography of Turkmenistan ===
Demographics of Turkmenistan

== Government and politics of Turkmenistan ==
Politics of Turkmenistan

- Form of government: Presidential republic
- Capital of Turkmenistan: Ashgabat
- Elections in Turkmenistan
- Political parties in Turkmenistan

=== Branches of government of Turkmenistan ===
Government of Turkmenistan

==== Executive branch of Turkmenistan ====
- Head of state and Head of government: President of Turkmenistan, Serdar Berdimuhamedov

==== Legislative branch of Turkmenistan ====
- Parliament of Turkmenistan (bicameral per 2020 constitutional amendment)
  - Upper house: Halk Maslahaty
  - Lower house: Mejlis

==== Judicial branch of Turkmenistan ====
Court system of Turkmenistan

- Supreme Court of Turkmenistan

=== Foreign relations of Turkmenistan ===
Foreign relations of Turkmenistan

- Diplomatic missions in Turkmenistan
- Diplomatic missions of Turkmenistan

==== International organization membership ====
International organization membership of Turkmenistan Turkmenistan is a member of:

- Asian Development Bank (ADB)
- Commonwealth of Independent States (CIS)
- Economic Cooperation Organization (ECO)
- Euro-Atlantic Partnership Council (EAPC)
- European Bank for Reconstruction and Development (EBRD)
- Food and Agriculture Organization (FAO)
- Group of 77 (G77)
- International Bank for Reconstruction and Development (IBRD)
- International Civil Aviation Organization (ICAO)
- International Criminal Police Organization (Interpol)
- International Development Association (IDA)
- International Federation of Red Cross and Red Crescent Societies (IFRCS)
- International Finance Corporation (IFC)
- International Labour Organization (ILO)
- International Maritime Organization (IMO)
- International Monetary Fund (IMF)
- International Olympic Committee (IOC)
- International Organization for Migration (IOM) (observer)
- International Organization for Standardization (ISO) (correspondent)
- International Red Cross and Red Crescent Movement (ICRM)
- International Telecommunication Union (ITU)
- Islamic Development Bank (IDB)
- Multilateral Investment Guarantee Agency (MIGA)
- Nonaligned Movement (NAM)
- Organisation of Islamic Cooperation (OIC)
- Organization for Security and Cooperation in Europe (OSCE)
- Organisation for the Prohibition of Chemical Weapons (OPCW)
- Partnership for Peace (PFP)
- Shanghai Cooperation Organisation (SCO) (guest)
- United Nations (UN)
- United Nations Conference on Trade and Development (UNCTAD)
- United Nations Educational, Scientific, and Cultural Organization (UNESCO)
- United Nations Industrial Development Organization (UNIDO)
- Universal Postal Union (UPU)
- World Customs Organization (WCO)
- World Federation of Trade Unions (WFTU)
- World Health Organization (WHO)
- World Intellectual Property Organization (WIPO)
- World Meteorological Organization (WMO)
- World Tourism Organization (UNWTO)

=== Law and order in Turkmenistan ===
Law of Turkmenistan

- Capital punishment in Turkmenistan
- Constitution of Turkmenistan
- Human rights in Turkmenistan
  - LGBT rights in Turkmenistan
  - Women in Turkmenistan
  - Freedom of religion in Turkmenistan
- Law enforcement in Turkmenistan
  - Corruption in Turkmenistan
  - Human trafficking in Turkmenistan
  - Ministry of Internal Affairs (Turkmenistan)
  - Polygamy in Turkmenistan
  - Prostitution in Turkmenistan
  - Capital punishment in Turkmenistan
- Supreme Court of Turkmenistan
- Turkmen nationality law

=== Military of Turkmenistan ===
Military of Turkmenistan

- Command
  - Commander-in-chief:President of Turkmenistan
- Forces
- Armed Forces of Turkmenistan
- Chief of the General Staff (Turkmenistan)
- Ministry of Defense (Turkmenistan)
- State Border Service of Turkmenistan
- State Security Council of Turkmenistan
- Turkmen Air Force
- Turkmen Ground Forces
- Turkmen Internal Troops
- Turkmen National Guard
- Turkmen Naval Forces

=== Local government in Turkmenistan ===
Local government in Turkmenistan

== History of Turkmenistan ==
History of Turkmenistan

== Culture of Turkmenistan ==
Culture of Turkmenistan

- Cuisine of Turkmenistan
- Languages of Turkmenistan
- Media in Turkmenistan
- National symbols of Turkmenistan
  - Coat of arms of Turkmenistan
  - Flag of Turkmenistan
  - National anthem of Turkmenistan
- People of Turkmenistan
- Prostitution in Turkmenistan
- Public holidays in Turkmenistan
- Religion in Turkmenistan
  - Buddhism in Turkmenistan
  - Christianity in Turkmenistan
  - Islam in Turkmenistan
- List of World Heritage Sites in Turkmenistan

=== Art and Culture in Turkmenistan ===
- Cinema of Turkmenistan
- Music of Turkmenistan
- Television in Turkmenistan
- Turkmen carpet
- Turkmen cuisine
- Turkmen language
- Turkmen literature

=== Sports in Turkmenistan ===
- Football in Turkmenistan
  - Turkmenistan national football team
- Ice hockey in Turkmenistan
  - Turkmenistan men's national ice hockey team
- Turkmenistan at the Olympics

== Economy and infrastructure of Turkmenistan ==
Economy of Turkmenistan

- Economic rank, by nominal GDP (2007): 83rd (eighty-third)
- Agriculture in Turkmenistan
- Communications in Turkmenistan
  - Internet in Turkmenistan
- Companies of Turkmenistan
- Currency of Turkmenistan: Manat
  - ISO 4217: TMT
- Energy in Turkmenistan
- Health care in Turkmenistan
- Tourism in Turkmenistan
- Transport in Turkmenistan
  - Airports in Turkmenistan
  - Rail transport in Turkmenistan

== Education in Turkmenistan ==
Education in Turkmenistan

- List of universities in Turkmenistan

== Health in Turkmenistan ==
Health in Turkmenistan

== See also ==
Turkmenistan

- List of international rankings
- List of Turkmenistan-related topics
- Member state of the United Nations
- Outline of Asia
- Outline of geography
