= Methane leak =

Unintended escape of methane from containment

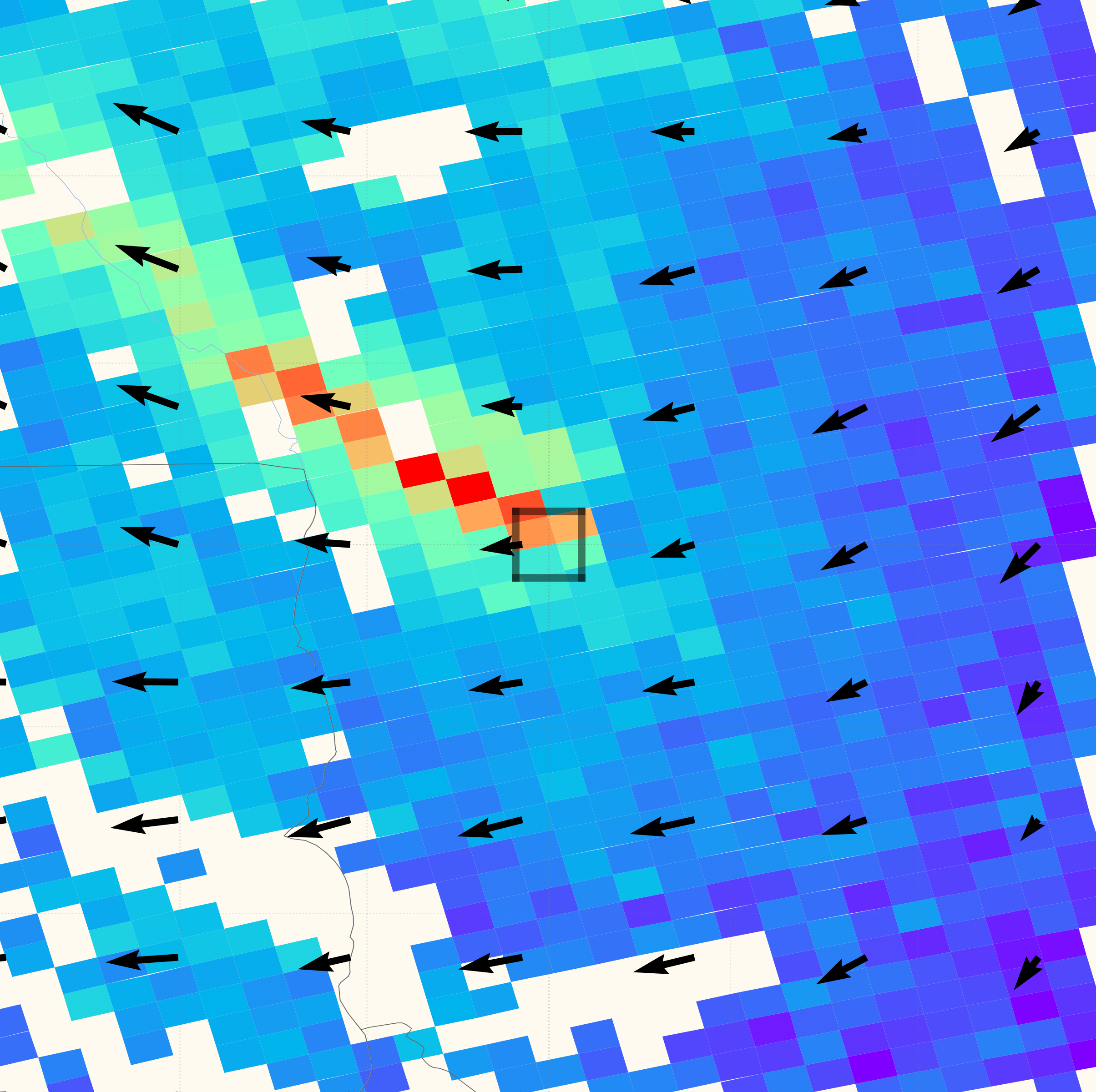
Methane plume over Turkmenistan, 2020 image from the Sentinel-5 Precursor satellite

A methane leak is a significant natural gas leak. The term is used for a class of methane emissions, which can come from an industrial facility or pipeline.

Satellite data enables the identification of super-emitter events (synonymous with ultra-emitters, see "Mitigation of ultra-emitters") that produce methane plumes. Over 1,000 methane leaks of this type were found worldwide in 2022. As with other gas leaks, a leak of methane is a safety hazard: coalbed methane in the form of fugitive gas emission has always been a danger to miners. Methane leaks also have a serious environmental impact. Natural gas contains methane, ethane, and other gases, which from the safety and environmental point of view raise major issues with atmospheric composition and human health.

As a greenhouse gas and climate change contributor, methane ranks second, following carbon dioxide. Fossil fuel exploration, transportation and production is responsible for about 40% of human-caused methane emissions. Smaller leaks than can be spotted from space comprise long tail of emissions. They can be identified from planes flying at 900 meters (3,000 ft). According to Fatih Birol of the International Energy Agency, "Methane emissions are still far too high, especially as methane cuts are among the cheapest options to limit near-term global warming".

== Examples of methane leaks ==
Individual methane leaks are reported as specific events with a large quantity of gas released. An example followed the 2022 Nord Stream pipeline sabotage. Following early reports that the escape might exceed 10^{5} tonnes, The International Methane Emissions Observatory of the United Nations Environment Programme analyzed the release. In February 2023 it put the mass of methane gas in the range 7.5 to 23.0 × 10^{4} tonnes. In terms of overall human-made methane emissions, these figures are under 0.1% of the annual total.

Satellite data detection has shown that methane super emitter sites in Turkmenistan, the United States and Russia are responsible for the biggest number of events from fossil fuel facilities. Estimated emissions from oil and gas ultra-emitters rank highest for Turkmenistan with 1.3 megatons (Mt) of methane per year, followed by Russia, the United States, Iran, Kazakhstan, and Algeria. Equipment failures are normally responsible for the releases, which can last for weeks.

The Aliso Canyon gas leak of 2015 has been quantified as at least 1.09 × 10^{5} tonnes of methane. Satellite data for the Raspadskaya coal mine, Kemerovo Oblast, Russia indicated in 2022 an hourly methane leakage rate of 87 tonnes; this compares to 60 tonnes per hour of natural gas leaking from the Aliso Canyon incident, considered among the worst recorded leak events.

Spain's Technical University of Valencia, in a study published in 2022, found that a super emitter event at a gas and oil platform in the Gulf of Mexico released around 4 × 10^{4} tonnes of methane during a 17-day time period in December 2021 (hourly rate around 98 tonnes). Another major event in 2022 was a leak of 427 tonnes an hour in August, near Turkmenistan's Caspian coast and a major pipeline.

== Mitigation of ultra-emitters ==
Ultra-emitters of methane are characterized by producing more than 25 tons/hour of CH_{4} from oil and gas activities, and are in the top 1% of methane emitters in the world. Reducing emissions from these sites can be done by enforcing leak detection and by reducing venting during routine maintenance.

Ultra-emitters are common and particularly large in Russia, Iran, Turkmenistan, and Kazakhstan, representing 10-20% of annual reported emissions across the globe. The U.S. is found to house 5% of annual worldwide emissions, but this number excludes emissions from drilling in the Permian Basin, which accounts for 10% of U.S. natural gas production. Drilling in the Permian Basin creates about 2.7 Mt a year of emissions, which is 35% of U.S. oil and gas production emissions.

Spending for mitigation of ultra-emitters is funded by the International Energy Agency (IEA), Environmental Protection Agency (EPA), and International Institute for Applied Systems Analysis (IIASA). Emissions from ultra-emitters are expected to be more cost-effective to mitigate than average-sized sources due to efficiency and leak efforts.

== Leakage from abandoned oil and gas wells ==
The geographic area of Lubbock has been a site of ongoing emissions research to assess the extent and environmental implications of methane leakage from abandoned wells. Lubbock is located within the Permian Basin in West Texas, United States, and includes an estimate of 1781 drilling wells. Aeromagnetic surveys are used to detect active and abandoned wells and are able to detect those with no visible aboveground markers. Regular monitoring and repair initiatives targeting emissions from storage tanks can be particularly impactful in mitigating vented emissions. Even with efforts to accurately measure the greenhouse gas emissions associated with the abandoned wells, emissions data is still relatively uncertain due to gas characterization and source concerns.

== Methane detection sensors ==
Usage of methane gas detection sensors vary based on region, environmental conditions, and purpose of measurements. Types of sensors include optical sensors, calorimetric sensors, pyroelectric sensors, semiconducting oxide sensors, and electrochemical sensors.

=== Optical sensors ===
Optical sensors detect changes in light waves that interact with the receptor. They are optimal in regions where there could be electromagnetic interference and at high altitudes where oxygen content is low. They are also non-destructive and result in little to no environmental harm. However, they have high costs in large settings and low selectivity.

=== Calorimetric sensors ===
Calorimetric sensors measure the heat produced from a reaction and compare the value to reactant concentration. These sensors are low cost and have a simple design. They are able to operate in harsh conditions but are susceptible to cracking and accelerated degradation. They also require high power consumption to operate and have low detection accuracy.

=== Pyroelectric sensors ===
Pyroelectric sensors convert thermal energy into electrical energy based on pyroelectricity. They have good sensitivity and responsivity, can operate without oxygen, and have a wide measuring range. Among the limitations of pyroelectric sensors are cost and difficulty in manufacturing, but the most detrimental is the immobility of the sensor once positioned.

=== Semiconducting metal oxide sensors ===
Semiconducting metal oxide sensors measure methane by detecting the absorption of gas on the surface of a metal oxide, which changes its conductivity. These instruments are low cost, lightweight, and have a long lifespan. They may not be used as widely due to their poor selectivity, sensitivity to changes in temperature and humidity, and significant additive dependence.

=== Electrochemical sensors ===
Electrochemical sensors oxidize or reduce the gas detected at an electrode and measure the current to find methane gas concentration. These instruments are low cost, non-hazardous, and have low volatility. They also have good selectivity specifically for methane gas and can detect small leaks. They may have slow response time or be susceptible to degradation or loss of electrodes, however these sensors have returned promising results in the accuracy of small methane leak detection.

== Units ==
Quantitative reports of methane leaks often use the standard cubic foot (scf) of the United States customary system. Applied to natural gas, a complex mixture of uncertain proportions, and depending on pressure and temperature conditions, the accuracy of calculations converting scf to metric units of mass is subject to limitations. A conversion figure given is 5 × 10^{4} scf of natural gas as 1.32 short tons (1.20 t).

For detection sensitivity, quantitative criteria are typically stated in units of standard cubic feet per hour (scf/h, "skiff", US), or thousand standard cubic feet per day (Mscf/d); or with metric units kilograms per hour (kg/hr), cubic meters per day (m3/d).

Methane Tracking in the Permian Basin using EMIT and AVIRIS-3

To describe the mass balance of methane in the atmosphere, mass rates are described in units of Tg/yr, i.e. teragrams per year where a teragram is 10^{6} tonnes (megagrams). The methane leak from the Permian Basin, a significant region of the Mid-Continent Oil Producing Area, was estimated for 2018/9 from satellite data as 2.7 Tg/yr. Quoted in terms of the proportion of the mass of extracted gas, the leakage comes to 3.7%. The 2021 Carbon Mapper project, a collaboration of the Jet Propulsion Laboratory and academia, detected 533 methane super-emitters in the Permian Basin.

== Policy and regulation ==
=== European Union ===
Europe's share of global methane emissions in 2002.

The EU Methane Regulation (EU/2024/1787) is the European Union's first binding law on reducing methane emissions in the energy sector. It aims to reduce methane emissions into the atmosphere from the oil, gas and coal sectors, both in the EU and its global supply chains. Reducing emissions of methane, a potent greenhouse gas whose global warming potential is 82.5 times that of carbon dioxide on a 20-year timescale, is deemed crucial for achieving the EU’s climate goals and the objectives of the Global Methane Pledge. Set out in the EU Methane Strategy (COM/2020/663), the EU Methane Regulation entered into force on 4 August 2024, with most of its provisions being phased in over the following years.

The regulation establishes a range of measures to reduce methane emissions from fossil fuel operations within the EU, including mandatory leak detection and repair.
