= Norean R. Sharpe =

- Occupations: Author and academic

Academic background
- Education: University of Virginia, PhD. 1987; University of North Carolina, MS 1984; Mount Holyoke College, BA 1982

Academic work
- Discipline: Mathematics & Statistics
- Institutions: Bowdoin College; Babson College; Georgetown University; St. John’s University; Williams College.

Norean Radke Sharpe is an American author and academic, who has been a professor of statistics and administrator for nearly 35 years. Over the course of her career, she has taught at Bowdoin College, Babson College, Georgetown University, St. John’s University, and Williams College. Most recently, she served as Dean and Joseph H. and Maria C. Schwartz Distinguished Professor at the Tobin College of Business at St. John’s University from 2016 to 2023. Her previous appointment was Senior Associate Dean of the McDonough School of Business at Georgetown University in Washington, DC from 2009 – 2016. Sharpe currently serves as Director of the MS in Business Analytics program. Her research focuses on times series analysis, marketing models, risk management in business education, and women entrepreneurs.

Sharpe served as a prior honorary committee member of the American Women for International Understanding (AWIU).

== Selected publications ==
- ERM Informs Post Pandemic Path in Higher Education (w/ C. Vitter, J. Braunsdorf, and P. Walker), Deloitte Risk & Compliance Journal, Wall Street Journal, March 15, 2022.
- Enterprise Risk Management in Business Education (w/ P. Walker and N. Hubbard), in The Future of Business Schools, Edward Elgar Publishing, 2022.
- Living with the Dutch: An American Family in The Hague, 2nd Edition, Central Park South Publishing, 2021.
- Risk Gets Schooled: Educators Discuss the Value of ERM (w/ C. Rugeri and P. Walker), Deloitte Risk & Compliance Journal, Wall Street Journal, August, 2019.
- Business Statistics, 4th Edition (w/ R. De Veaux and P. Velleman), Pearson Education, Inc., 2019.
- Educating the First Generation (w/ K. Hutchinson), BizEd, AACSB, July/August, 2018.
- Private Colleges Play a Key Role in Diversifying America's Workforce, The Hill, July 22, 2017.
- Entrepreneurship and Innovation in the Middle East: Current Challenges and Recommended Policies (w/ C.M. Schroeder), in Innovation in Emerging Markets, Palgrave Macmillan Press Ltd., 2016.
- Embracing Risk, TEDx Talk, Georgetown University, March, 2016.
- Living with the Dutch: An American Family in The Hague, 1st Ed., KIT Publishers, 2005.
