= Velleman (surname) =

Velleman is a surname. Notable people with the surname include:

- CJ Velleman, South African rugby union player
- J. David Velleman (born 1952), American philosopher
- Michel Velleman (1895–1943), Dutch magician
- Paul F. Velleman (born 1949), American professor of statistics
