= Environmental issues in Turkmenistan =

Environmental issues in Turkmenistan are most visible in three significant areas: desertification, the drying of the Aral Sea, and chemical pollution. All three of these areas are directly linked to agricultural practices in the country.

Only the Sahara Desert in Africa has a higher rate of desertification than that of Central Asian deserts. Of these, the Karakum Desert and Kyzyl Kum Desert in Turkmenistan grow by hundreds of thousands of acres annually. These conditions persist due to inefficient agricultural irrigation and cattle grazing practices, which have led to the salinization of soil and the removal of ground cover plants respectively.

Inefficient irrigation techniques on the Amu Darya also contribute to the continued drying of the Aral Sea. Daşoguz Province experiences the most problems due to this drying. Drinking water quality has plummeted, bacteria levels in water have risen, and rates of infant mortality, hepatitis, and illness have risen.

Competition with neighbouring countries is also contributing to depleting water resources. Afghanistan is building a canal to divert water from the Amu Darya away from Turkmenistan.

Excessive use of fertilizer on cotton and other crops, as well as the use of pesticides such as DDT causes a large chemical pollution problem. Many fertilizers and pesticides have entered groundwater supplies via leaching or runoff from farms due to excessive or improper use.

Over 4 million tonnes of methane, a greenhouse gas which causes climate change, was vented or leaked in 2022. This has a greenhouse effect equivalent to 366 million tonnes of carbon dioxide, which was more than the UK’s annual emissions.

The country is cooperating with the European Union, its member states and the Organization for Security and Co-operation in Europe (OSCE) to reduce and manage the impact of these environmental problems. However as of 2023 it has not joined the Global Methane Pledge or the Oil and Gas Methane Partnership.
