= Christopher Schroeder =

Christopher Schroeder may refer to:

- Christopher H. Schroeder (born 1948), American lawyer
- Christopher M. Schroeder (born 1964), American entrepreneur
