= International Methane Emissions Observatory =

United Nations initiative

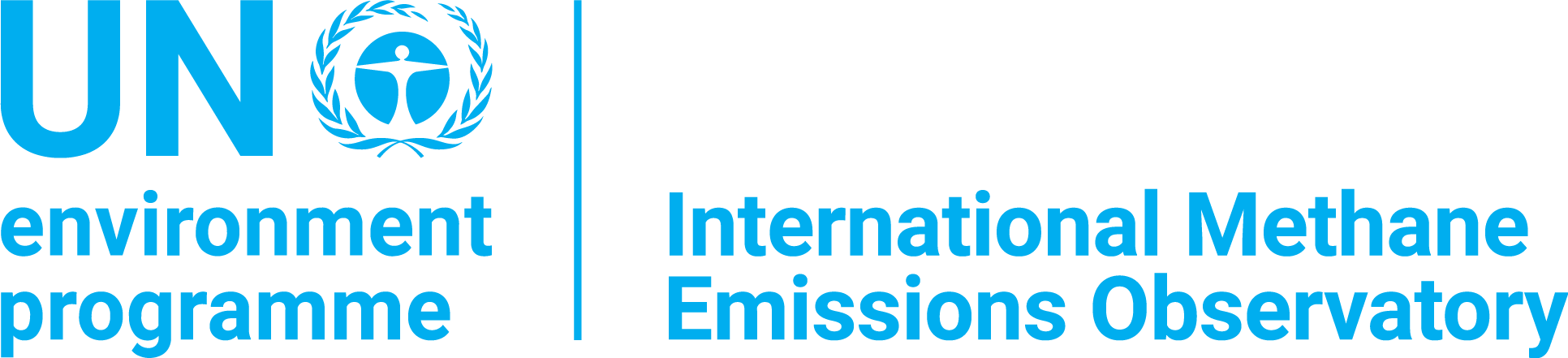
- Abbreviation: IMEO
- Formation: 31 October 2021
- Type: Programme
- Legal status: Active
- Purpose: Provide open, reliable and actionable data to the individuals with the agency to reduce methane emissions
- Headquarters: Paris, France
- Website: www.unep.org/imeo methanedata.unep.org www.linkedin.com/company/methanedata

The International Methane Emissions Observatory (IMEO) of the UN Environment Programme (UNEP) is an initiative that tackles the problem of methane emissions through credible, measurement-based data. IMEO’s mission is to provide open, reliable and actionable data to the individuals who have the agency to reduce methane emissions. This data enables reductions at a global scale by identifying mitigation opportunities, focusing efforts and resources and tracking progress over time. IMEO collects, integrates and reconciles methane data from different sources, including scientific measurement studies, satellites, industry reporting through the Oil and Gas Methane Partnership 2.0 (OGMP 2.0), the Steel Methane Programme (SMP) and national inventories. It was launched by UNEP at the G20 Leaders' Summit in 2021. Giulia Ferrini is the Head of IMEO.

IMEO serves as an implementing vehicle for the Global Methane Pledge and has the European Commission as one of its founding members. Other core government supporters include Germany, Australia, Japan and Canada, alongside several philanthropies such as the Global Methane Hub, Google.org, Bloomberg Philanthropies and the Bezos Earth Fund.

IMEO produces the An Eye on Methane report series. Each annual report takes stock of global progress scaling data-driven methane solutions. In 2026, IMEO published the Oil and Gas Methane Partnership 2.0 Report: From measurement to mitigation, better methane data is enabling action. The report assesses progress in measurement-based methane reporting and mitigation across OGMP 2.0 member companies, including developments in Level 5 reporting, methane emissions performance and transparency providing valuable insights for the sector.

IMEO provides open data access through Eye on Methane // GLOBAL.

== Methane Alert and Response System (MARS) ==
IMEO’s Methane Alert and Response System (MARS) is the first global system to provide free satellite-based alerts on major emission events to governments and companies. MARS integrates data from more than a dozen satellites to identify large emissions across the globe. UNEP sends alerts to enable action, and, through MARS, provides information and support for stakeholders to address the emissions.

To date, MARS has enabled and confirmed mitigation of over 40 major methane sources. Each mitigation involved issuing a MARS notification, evaluating the response for technical accuracy and confirming through subsequent satellite data that no further emissions have been detected.

Further information on each mitigation case is available here.

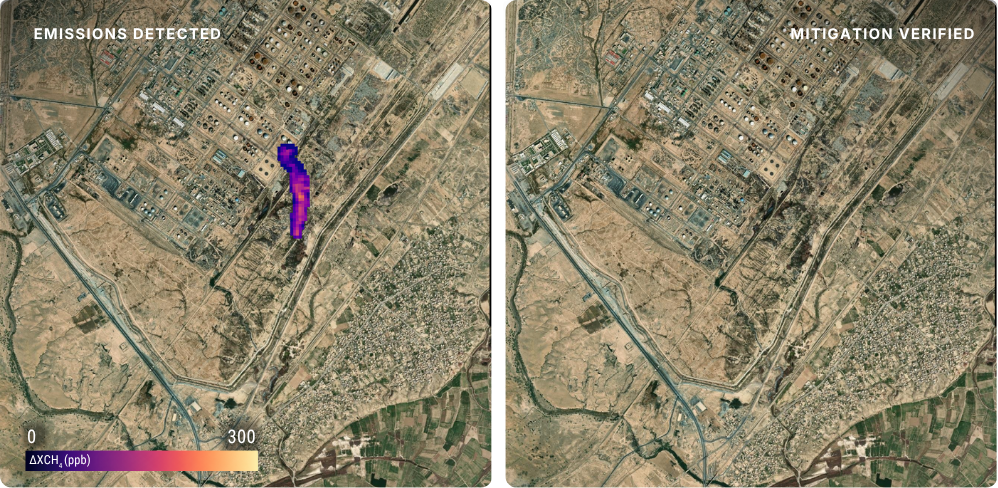
UNEP's MARS methane mitigation case in Iraq (IRQ_S_083) Attributions: Google Earth / NASA's EMIT / UNEP's IMEO

== Oil and Gas Methane Partnership 2.0 (OGMP 2.0) ==
UNEP’s Oil and Gas Methane Partnership 2.0 (OGMP 2.0) is the global methane standard for the oil and gas sector. It drives transparency and mitigation in the oil and gas sector through a five-tiered emissions reporting framework. OGMP 2.0 provides member companies a systematic way to monitor methane emissions and demonstrate reductions. Companies report methane emissions from all sources, from both operated and non-operated ventures across the oil and gas value chain, with increasing accuracy and granularity. IMEO collects companies’ data, ensures the completeness and integrity of their reporting and verifies progress toward targets.

Launched in November 2020, OGMP 2.0 membership represents roughly 45% of global oil and gas production.

== Methane Science Studies ==
The goal of IMEO's scientific work is to improve the world’s understanding of where emissions come from and how much methane is emitted.

IMEO commissions peer-reviewed studies to provide robust, publicly available data and improved methods for measurement to allow governments, industry, and other stakeholders to prioritize effective actions to assess and reduce methane emissions. The programme extends across all methane-emitting sectors and includes studies across more than 20 countries, as well as several global studies. All emissions data are released publicly and results of the studies are published in peer-reviewed journals.

As the number and variety of measurement tools has grown, integrating methane data across sectors has become critical. IMEO also leads an effort to integrate and reconcile data from disparate sources to produce a comprehensive picture of methane emissions.

== Steel Methane Programme ==
IMEO’s Steel Methane Programme (SMP) targets emissions in the steel supply chain. More than 70 per cent of the world’s steel is produced using blast furnaces, which rely on met coal as a fuel and chemical reductant. Methane is released from coal seams during mining and processing and adds about on average a quarter to steel’s climate footprint.

With the demand for steel set to persist and as an integral part of the transition towards low-carbon steel, mitigating methane emissions is critical to limit the impact of the steel industry on global warming under any decarbonization scenario.

SMP seeks to define the “Gold Standard” for measurement, reporting and verification (MRV) of methane emissions in the sector, and advance ambitious mitigation targets. This builds on IMEO’s success with the Oil and Gas Methane Partnership 2.0.

== IMEO's Eye on Methane // SUITE ==
The UN Environment Programme's International Methane Emissions Observatory (IMEO)'s Eye on Methane // SUITE is a set of tools that delivers open, reliable and actionable global methane emissions data from satellites, companies and methane science studies — all in one user-friendly interface. It is designed to empower governments and companies to drive impactful methane mitigation action, while providing transparent, reliable data to civil society and media. Eye on Methane // SUITE currently includes:

- Eye on Methane // GLOBAL for media, researchers, policymakers and members of the public.
- Eye on Methane // INSIGHTS for governments and companies.

Eye on Methane // GLOBAL is the public methane emissions data platform, integrating information from multiple sources to support mitigation efforts across governments, companies and civil society.

It consolidates three primary data streams:

- Industry reporting through the Oil and Gas Methane Partnership 2.0 (OGMP 2.0), the UNEP-led framework for standardized methane emissions measurement and reporting, and the Steel Methane Programme.
- Satellite detections through the Methane Alert and Response System (MARS), which tracks major emission events across sectors worldwide.
- Methane science studies supported by IMEO to refine global emission estimates and methodologies.

Eye on Methane // GLOBAL combines these data streams in a unified database and interactive interface, allowing users to explore emissions by geography, company and sector source type.

Eye on Methane // INSIGHTS — a secure portal that complements the public-facing Eye on Methane // GLOBAL — provides authorized users from governments and OGMP 2.0 companies with tailored methane information to support mitigation action.

Launched in 2023, the platform aims to improve the accuracy, transparency and accountability of methane emissions reporting, contributing to the implementation of the Global Methane Pledge and supporting global efforts to reduce greenhouse gas emissions.

== Methane emissions ==
Methane is an important greenhouse gas, and its atmospheric concentration has nearly tripled since pre-industrial times. It is responsible for about a third of current anthropogenic climate warming. Its relatively short atmospheric lifespan – 10 to 12 years – means that reducing methane emissions can yield near-term reductions in the rate of warming, as well as air quality, public health, and energy security benefits. Considered the climate’s “emergency brake,” methane reductions can immediately slow the rate of warming in the near term as decarbonization of the global energy system progresses.

In its special report in 2019, the Intergovernmental Panel on Climate Change (IPCC) concluded that deep reductions in methane emissions must be achieved by 2030 to limit warming to 1.5 or even 2 degrees Celsius. In the IPCC 6th Assessment report (2023), the IPCC reiterated methane’s importance, finding methane mitigation to be one of the most cost-effective levers to rapidly reducing the rate of global warming in the near-term. It also cited robust evidence that drastic cuts in methane are critical for near-term climate benefits, improved air quality, and the success of the Paris Agreement targets.

The fossil fuel industry is responsible for an estimated one-third of anthropogenic methane emissions and is the sector with the highest potential for rapid and cost-effective reductions, slowing the rate of warming in the near term even as decarbonization of the global energy system progresses.
