= American Women for International Understanding =

American Women for International Understanding (AWIU) is a nonprofit organization dedicated to fostering international goodwill and understanding through cultural exchange, educational programs, and advocacy for women's leadership worldwide. Founded in 1968, AWIU facilitates connections between women in the United States and those in other countries to promote mutual understanding and global engagement.

== History ==
AWIU was founded in 1968 by Bernice Behrens, a women's rights activist who sought to improve communication and collaboration between women from different cultures. Inspired by her travels and experiences in diplomacy, Behrens established AWIU as a platform for cross-cultural dialogue and international exchange. Since its inception, AWIU has organized numerous delegations, educational initiatives, and leadership programs aimed at strengthening global ties among women.

== Mission and activities ==
The mission of AWIU is to build bridges of international understanding through personal exchange and collaboration. They achieve this through educational programs, delegations, and advocacy initiatives. The organization works to:

- Encourage cultural exchange and diplomacy.
- Provide networking and mentorship opportunities for women leaders.
- Organize international delegations to foster person-to-person diplomacy.
- Promote discussions on global issues affecting women.

== Notable programs ==
- International Women of Courage (IWOC): The IWOC Award was established by the U.S. Department of State in 2007 to honor women who are making a substantial difference in the lives of women around the globe. AWIU provides each of the awardees with a grant to support continued efforts in her home country and runs a grant program for IWOC Alumnae to continue their efforts.
- Passport to the Future: The Passport program provides an opportunity for young women to learn and receive mentorship from leading women in international relations.
- Micro-Grants: AWIU's grant program focuses on issuing micro-grants groups which enhance the wellbeing of women within low- and middle-income countries. They focus on projects related to education, health, and entrepreneurial development.
- Career Opportunities in International Relations (COIR): COIR events offer young women the chance to learn about careers in international affairs and engage directly with women leaders in the field.
- Delegations: AWIU has sponsored more than 65 delegations to more than 100 countries, some breaking new ground, including a delegation to Russia in 1968, China in 1973, Saudi Arabia in 2002, and Libya in 2009.

== Impact and recognition ==
AWIU has facilitated connections between women from many different backgrounds, influencing policy discussions and international cooperation. Over the years, the organization has collaborated with government agencies, educational institutions, and international organizations. Notable figures in diplomacy and global affairs have participated in AWIU's programs, further cementing its role in international relations. In 2022, AWIU was awarded the Department of State Gender Champion Award for their work in international women's rights.

== See also ==
- Women in International Relations
- Cultural Diplomacy
- Women's leadership programs
