= National symbols of Turkmenistan =

The flag of Turkmenistan

The emblem of Turkmenistan

The national symbols of Turkmenistan are defined in Article 14 of the Constitution of Turkmenistan. They consist of the Flag, the Coat of Arms, and the National Anthem. Online copies of them are available on the website of the Assembly of Turkmenistan, or Mejlis.

The National Anthem of the Independent Neutral Türkmenistan

The great creation of Türkmenbaşy
Native land, sovereign state
Türkmenistan, light and song of soul
Long live and prosper for ever and ever!

I am ready to give life for native hearth
The spirit of ancestors descendants are famous for
My land is sacred. My flag flies in the world
A symbol of the great neutral country flies.

The great creation of Türkmenbaşy
Native land, sovereign state
Türkmenistan, light and song of soul
Long live and prosper forever and ever!

My nation is united and in veins of tribes
Ancestors' blood, undying flows
Storms and misfortunes of times are not dreadful for us
Let us increase fame and honour!

The great creation of Türkmenbaşy,
Native land, sovereign state
Türkmenistan, light and song of soul
Long live and prosper for ever and ever!

Mountains, rivers and beauty of steppes
Love and destiny, revelation of mine
Let my eyes go blind for any cruel look at you

Motherland of ancestors and heirs of mine!

These lyrics are found in the English translation of the Ruhnama (which is not an exact translation of the Turkmen original, but a translation of the Russian version), originally written by Saparmurat Niyazov (Turkmenbashy) before the changes introduced by Turkmenistan's Parliament in December 2008, replacing all references to Turkmenbashy with the people.

My soul is a sacrifice to you, my beloved country,
The spirit of a brave father is in my heart.
The light of a neutral and independent land
Your flag is raised high before the world.

The great eternal creation of the people,
My sovereign state, my heart and soul.
You are the crown of heads, the praise of tongues.
Let the world stand still, let you be still, Turkmenistan!

The tribes are brothers; the nations live in peace.
For after all, our blood is one.
No storms nor floods can ever break us,

Generation after generation will rise to defend our honour.
