= Capital punishment in Turkmenistan =

Capital punishment in Turkmenistan was originally allowed under Article 20 of the 1992 Constitution, where it was described as "an exceptional punishment for the heaviest of crimes". In December 1999, a presidential decree abolished capital punishment "forever". The death penalty was replaced with 25 years imprisonment, but laws were later amended to allow for life imprisonment after an alleged assassination attempt on President Niyazov in 2002.

Prior to abolition, Turkmenistan had one of the highest rates of execution per capita in the world; in 1996 the country carried out at least 400 executions. Death sentences were carried out by shooting in the basement of the now-demolished BL-T/5 Prison in Türkmenbaşy, which was the only prison in the country equipped with a death row. The last executions occurred in 1997, including that of border guard Maj. Vitaly Usachev, who was controversially executed for alleged drug trafficking in early 1997.

In the 2003 Constitution, Article 20 reads: "The death penalty in Turkmenistan is completely abolished and banned forever by the first President of Turkmenistan Great Saparmurat Türkmenbaşy".

Turkmenistan is a member of the Second Optional Protocol to the International Covenant on Civil and Political Rights, aiming at the abolition of the death penalty.
