= EU Methane Regulation =

EU regulation on methane emission

Europe's share of global methane emissions in 2002.

The EU Methane Regulation (EU/2024/1787) is the European Union's first binding law on reducing methane emissions in the energy sector. It aims to reduce methane emissions into the atmosphere from the oil, gas and coal sectors, both in the EU and its global supply chains. Reducing emissions of methane, a potent greenhouse gas whose global warming potential is 82.5 times that of carbon dioxide on a 20-year timescale, is deemed crucial for achieving the EU’s climate goals and the objectives of the Global Methane Pledge. Set out in the EU Methane Strategy (COM/2020/663), the EU Methane Regulation entered into force on 4 August 2024, with most of its provisions being phased in over the following years.

== Legislation ==
The EU Methane Regulation was first proposed in December 2021 as part of the Fit-for-55 package, following the adoption of the EU Methane Strategy in 2020. It builds on existing standards, such as the Oil and Gas Methane Partnership 2.0 (OGMP 2.0) framework. It applies to both EU-based producers and importers of fossil fuels, alongside third-country producers whose output enters the EU market. This means its regulatory influence extends beyond EU borders, with the potential to raise global methane management standards.

The regulation establishes a range of measures to reduce methane emissions from fossil fuel operations within the EU, including:

- Mandatory measurement, reporting and verification (MRV): Companies must submit reports for emissions at the source level, including for non-operated assets.
- Mandatory leak detection and repair (LDAR): Oil and gas facilities must perform regular checks of equipment. If found, leaks must be repaired and monitored.
- Ban of routine venting and flaring: Venting and flaring in the oil and gas sectors is restricted to unavoidable circumstances for technical or safety reasons.
- Limitation of coal-mine venting: From 2027, restrictions apply to methane venting at certain coal mines, with a tighter threshold applying from 2031.
- Management of abandoned assets: Closed, inactive, plugged and abandoned assets (such as oil and gas wells, or coal mines) require mapping and emissions mitigation plans.

The regulation also contains measures aimed at increasing global transparency and taking action on methane emissions from oil, gas and coal imports:

- Methane transparency database: The Commission is establishing a public methane transparency database of emissions reported by importers and EU operators, scheduled to be launched in September 2026.
- Methane performance profiles: Creation of country and company methane performance profiles for importer use.
- Super-emitting alert mechanism: Implementation of a global methane emitters monitoring system and rapid alert mechanism for super-emitting events that contains data on magnitude, location and recurrence of such events around the world. The Commission has the right to request timely information on the actions taken by the countries concerned to address such events.

The regulation also phases in a number of requirements for importers into the EU over time:

- Reporting requirement, 5 May 2025: Importers must provide qualitative information on the origin, route, and what MRV, loss detection and repair measures were applied to crude oil, gas, or coal imported into the EU.
- Measurement, Reporting, and Verification requirement, 1 January 2027: Importers must demonstrate that crude oil, gas, or coal imported into the EU was produced with MRV requirements equivalent to those applied domestically in the EU, or at OGMP 2.0 Level 5 (reconciliation) plus verification for oil and gas, for contracts signed or renewed after 4 August 2024.
- Methane intensity reporting requirement, 5 August 2028: Importers must report the methane intensity of imported crude oil, gas, or coal at production, in line with the methodology to be set out by the Commission, for contracts signed or renewed after 4 August 2024.
- Methane intensity requirement, 5 August 2030: Importers must demonstrate that the imported crude oil, gas, or coal has a methane intensity below a limit set by the Commission, for contracts signed or renewed after 4 August 2030. For pre-existing contracts, "all reasonable efforts" must be undertaken.

=== Compliance ===
Enforcement, decisions around compliance, and reporting for much of the regulation, including for the international dimension, falls upon National Competent Authorities in each EU country.

Non-compliance is subject to penalties set out in each EU country. Member states set and enforce their own penalty rules. Article 33 of the regulation requires Member States to set penalties that are "effective, proportionate and dissuasive," capped at a hard ceiling of 20% of the annual turnover of the relevant entity in the preceding business year. Member states' practices vary; some member states have not yet adopted national sanctioning frameworks. Denmark is one of the more advanced models, with court-set penalties starting from a suggested €10,000 minimum per infringement category, whereas Czechia, by contrast, has drafted rules with no defined minimum floor.

Penalties cannot affect energy security or supply. The EU Methane Regulation does not restrict imports, and no cargo can be legally turned away for non-compliance.

== Impact ==
Methane is a potent greenhouse gas with a global warming potential 82.5 times that of carbon dioxide on a 20-year timescale. After carbon dioxide, it is the second greatest contributor to climate change. The fossil fuel sector accounts for more than a third of methane emissions from human activity globally.

Tackling methane emissions is deemed necessary for achieving the 2050 climate objectives of the European Green Deal and the objectives of the Global Methane Pledge. Keeping promises on methane alongside renewables and energy efficiency would avoid nearly 1 °C of global heating, according to a 2025 analysis by the Climate Action Tracker coalition.

Addressing methane emissions can also strengthen energy security by reclaiming otherwise wasted gas. The International Energy Agency says more than double the volume of gas blocked at the Strait of Hormuz is wasted each year due to methane leaks and unnecessary flaring in the oil and gas sector. Abatement measures could make this 200 billion cubic metres of gas available to global markets annually.

== Debate ==
Since its adoption, the EU Methane Regulation has come under sustained pressure. Industry groups, importers and several member states have lobbied to fold it into the Commission's "omnibus" simplification drive or to delay its implementation outright. The Commission has so far kept the regulation out of the omnibus package, but has agreed to a "pragmatic" rollout of import rules and a three-year penalty waiver.

The United States administration has been a vocal critic. Washington formally asked Brussels to exempt US gas exports from the regulation, and US firms together with the Chamber of Commerce held a series of talks with the Commission on easing liquified natural gas standards. US Ambassador to the EU, Andrew Puzder, has led the charge, warning of a severe energy crisis unless the EU eases its green rules, and making the case in an opinion piece for the Financial Times.

The oil and gas industry has also lobbied extensively. ExxonMobil has run paid advertising and sponsored content in EU media describing the methane rules as an energy security risk. Oil and gas companies pushed the Commission to reopen the methane rules and for a pause before the law takes effect. Eurogas issued a joint statement ahead of the June 2026 European Council and Energy Council meetings calling for changes to the regulation.

Experts have refuted claims that the regulation will impact European energy security. Professor Jonathan Stern of the Oxford Institute for Energy Studies described claims that the regulation threatens EU energy security as “overstated”. David King, founder of the Climate Crisis Advisory Group and former UK Government Chief Scientific Adviser, urged the EU to resist calls to water down the regulation, asserting that compliant gas supplies already exceed EU needs.

Analysis by Rystad Energy argues there is no evidence that delaying implementation of the regulation would improve energy security. Analysis by Data Desk finds only a very small amount of gas consumed in Europe is tied to contracts signed after the regulation’s August 2024 cutoff date and thus subject to it: 13 bcm a year of deliveries by 2027, which is roughly 4% of current gas consumption. In a later analysis of gas supply at the country level, Data Desk finds European member states will likely have access to ample supplies of gas that can comply with the EU Methane Regulation in the coming years.

Environmental groups have also pushed back on lobbyist claims. In June 2026, Climate Action Network (CAN) Europe ran sponsored content in EU media, warning that fossil fuel companies were exploiting Europe’s energy price crisis to weaken its methane rules with unfounded claims.

In February 2026, US lawmakers wrote to EU officials arguing producers face no real risk from the rule. Congressman Sean Casten went further in June 2026, accusing the Trump administration of trying to "threaten" the EU over its import-tracking plans, and said the bloc holds substantial leverage over US gas purchases that it should be willing to use.

In July 2026, Politico reported that European Commission officials believe gas exporters will ultimately continue selling into Europe despite supply shock warnings.

== Implementation ==
=== Penalty waiver ===
At the 26 June 2026 Energy Council, pressure on the regulation intensified as 17 member states formally backed a three-year postponement of importer requirements, citing supply risks. Energy Commissioner Dan Jørgensen rejected a full legislative delay. However, by mid-July, the European Commission advanced a "pragmatic" compromise: preparing written recommendations to grant a three-year penalty waiver while keeping the regulation's timeline officially intact, citing the risk to energy supply from disruption linked to the Iran war. Critics said this would hamper the Regulation’s enforcement teeth, while the Clean Air Task Force urged the Commission to limit any suspension to one year rather than three.

=== Postponement ===
In September 2026, French President Emmanuel Macron called on the EU to take action against increasing energy prices in a letter to Commission President Ursula von der Leyen, requesting a one-year delay to the EU Methane Regulation's import requirements, among other measures. Days after, EU Energy Commissioner Dan Jørgensen instructed his services to evaluate postponing the regulation’s import provisions due to enter into force on 1 January 2027, to allow market actors additional time to comply with the new framework. A spokesperson for the European Commission later confirmed the Commission “plans to propose a postponement of the entry into force of the regulation”, ‌without specifying its length.

On 14 October 2026, the European Commission proposed a one-year postponement to the EU’s methane emission regulations for oil and gas imports, following pressure from countries such as France and the United States.
