= Women in Turkmenistan =

Women comprise 50.8% of Turkmenistan's population. They generally have assigned roles in society and reduced rights compared to men. Study of women's rights in the country is made difficult by government censorship and lack of reliable, official data.

Under Article 18 of the Constitution of Turkmenistan, women are guaranteed equal rights to men. In practice, however, they face routine political and societal discrimination. Women are not allowed to form independent women's organizations, and all such organizations must be registered under the Women's Union of Turkmenistan. They make up 16.8% of the country's Parliament. Most women work in the home, as mothers or homemakers, or in the markets as sellers. Though the country's Islamic roots are several centuries old, Turkmen women never were and are not required to wear a face covering.

== Background ==
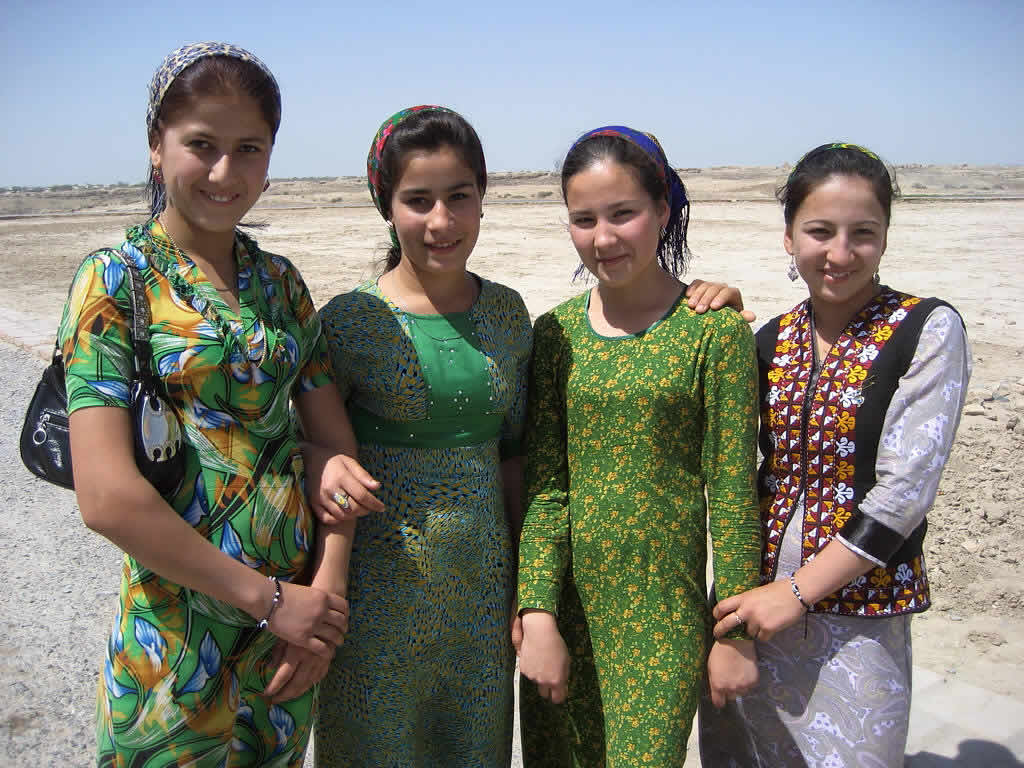
Women in Turkmenistan

Location of Turkmenistan

Turkmenistan is a country in Central Asia. Throughout the centuries, the territory of present-day Turkmenistan has been subjected to numerous civilizations, such as Persian empires, the conquest of Alexander the Great, Muslims, Mongols, Turkic peoples, and Russians. Throughout most of the 20th century it was part of the Soviet Union, until its fall in 1991. As with other former Soviet states, in the 1990s the economy collapsed and the country experienced social problems. Today, Turkmenistan is about half urban and half rural; its population is largely Muslim (89%), but there is also a significant Eastern Orthodox minority. The total fertility rate is 2.09 children born/woman (2015 est.).

During the Soviet period, women assumed responsibility for the observance of some Muslim rites to protect their husbands' careers. Many women entered the work force out of economic necessity, a factor that disrupted some traditional family practices and increased the incidence of divorce. At the same time, educated urban women entered professional services and careers. After the collapse of the Soviet Union, however, traditional values began to reassert themselves. This had led to increasing numbers of women confined to the home and dependent on their male counterparts.

== Cultural role ==
Cooking is the main field of work for women. Neighbours or relatives sometimes arrive unasked to assist in housework, or they may bring their own household tasks to work on together and socialize. Food preparation is done in the open air as well as in in-house kitchens. Tasks such as smoking meat and popping corn, are done by men and often turn into a social opportunity.

Men and women might sit and eat in one place, but they are segregated during social occasions. Some women carry on the practice of wearing a yaşmak, head scarf, in the initial year after they are wed. The wife clenches the corner of her scarf in her teeth to show a significant barrier toward the male guests and to show respect to her parents-in-law. The scarf also stops her from communicating. The wife may stop covering her head with a yaşmak after a year of her wedding, after the birth of her first born, or by a decision within the family.

== Practices ==
=== Clothing ===
Women are garbed in ankle-length garments of silk or velvet, which are commonly a mix of bright oranges, purples, yellows, blues, and greens. The necklines are embellished with elaborate gold-thread needlework that drops down, decorating the neckline right to the navel. Richly decorated headwear, jewelry and embroidery accents are a part of their routine. Face covering is not required by law.

=== Work ===
Manufacturing of ketene, a homespun silk, persists largely as a cottage skill. Garments prepared from ketene are worn by both men and women. Costumes made from ketene are used as a customary bridal dress. The embroidery on the garments reveal various patterns that are exclusively known as a family hallmark, distinguishing the family of its maker. Skilled Turkmen women use antique weaving looms known as tara, which were adopted in the ancient times.

Turkmen teachers and healthcare workers are primarily women.

=== Marriage ===
Article 25 of the Constitution of Turkmenistan requires mutual consent for marriage. Both individuals must also be above the age of 18. Turkmen marriages feature numerous unique customs and rituals. Turkmen wedding dresses are often richly decorated and covered in silver-colored pendants which are believed to drive away evil spirits.

== Political influence ==
Women comprise 16.8% of the Turkmen Parliament, and domestic law guarantees women the right to political participation. However, the actual participation of women in government is stifled by the curtailing of nongovernmental organizations (NGOs).
