= Paul F. Velleman =

American academic (born 1949)

Paul Velleman
- Born: April 16, 1949 (age 77)

Academic background
- Education: Dartmouth College (AB); Princeton University (MA, PhD)

Academic work
- Discipline: Statistics
- Institutions: Cornell University

Paul F. Velleman (born April 16, 1949) is an American academic who is a professor of statistics at Cornell University.

== Education ==
Velleman earned a Bachelor of Arts degree in mathematics and social science from Dartmouth College, followed by Master of Arts and PhD from Princeton University. Velleman's thesis was written on the topic of non-linear data smoothing.

== Career ==
He is the author and designer of the multimedia statistics CD-ROM, ActivStats, for which he was awarded the EDUCOM Medal for innovative uses of computers in teaching statistics, and the ICTCM Award for Innovation in Using Technology in College Mathematics. He developed the statistics program, Data Desk and the Internet site Data and Story Library (DASL), which provides datasets for teaching statistics. In 1987, he was elected as a Fellow of the American Statistical Association.

=== Books ===
He is co-author (with Richard De Veaux and David Bock) of Intro Stats, Stats: Modeling the World, and Stats: Data and Models, Business Statistics and Business Statistics: A First Course (with Norean Sharpe and Richard De Veaux) and the co-author (with David Hoaglin) of ABCs of Exploratory Data Analysis. Velleman taught statistics at Cornell University from 1975 to 2018. He is a Fellow of the American Statistical Association and of the American Association for the Advancement of Science.

== See also ==
- Data Desk
