= Data Desk =

- Developer: Data Description Inc.
- Stable release: 7.0.2 (Win), 7.0.2 (Mac)
- Operating system: Windows & Mac
- Type: Statistical analysis
- License: proprietary
- Website: www.datadesk.com

Data Desk was a software program for visual data analysis, visual data exploration, and statistics. It carried out Exploratory Data Analysis (EDA) and standard statistical analyses by means of dynamically linked graphic data displays that instantly updated to reflect any change in the data.

== History ==
Data Desk was developed in 1985 by Paul F. Velleman, a statistics professor at Cornell University who had studied exploratory data analysis with John Tukey. Data Desk was released in 1986 for the Macintosh. It provided most standard statistical methods accessed through its own desktop interface.

In 1997, Data Desk was released for Windows, and included a General Linear Model (GLM), multivariate statistics, and nonlinear curve fitting. DD/XL is an add-in for Microsoft Excel that adds Data Desk Functionality directly to the Spreadsheet

Data Desk's developer, Data Description, pioneered linked graphic displays including a 3-D rotating plot and graphical slider control of parameters. It has also developed proprietary technology for computer-based multimedia instruction and currently provides contract data analysis services.

In an undated statement on their webside, Data Description announced that the company was being dissolved and all sales, trial downloads and upgrades had ceased.

== Reviews ==
MacUser in November 1988 rated Data Desk Professional 4.5 mice out of 5. Approving of its features, user interface, and "rarely seen better" documentation, the magazine concluded "You can find less expensive packages, but ... you'll get what you pay for".

Macworld reviewed DD/XL on December 1, 2000 with a 4.5 out of 5.

InfoWorld reviewed Data Desk 6.0 and said "DataDesk Plus is by far the best Windows package for in-depth data exploration". Also, DataDesk Plus is easily the best Windows statistics package for teaching statistics"

Macworld reviewed Data Desk in October 1997, and gave it 9.1 out of 10, and a 5 star rating.

== See also ==
- Data visualization
