= International rankings of Turkmenistan =

These are the international rankings of Turkmenistan

Organization	Survey	Ranking
Institute for Economics and Peace	Global Peace Index	101 out of 144
United Nations Development Programme	Human Development Index	109 out of 182
Transparency International	Corruption Perceptions Index	168 out of 180
