= Women's Leadership Programme =

United Nations gender equality programme

Women's Leadership Programme is a programme launched by the UN aiming at Women's Leadership Index for 50–50 women leaders in public offices by 2050.
