= Prostitution in Turkmenistan =

Prostitution in Turkmenistan is illegal but common. Prostitution has increased within the country since the collapse of the Soviet Union. Poverty is one of the reasons women have turned to prostitution, sometimes under pressure from family members.

Prostitutes frequent bars, casinos and nightclubs, some are addicted to heroin. In Daşoguz, a major truck stop, many 'night butterflies' service the truck drivers in the overnight truck parks. STDs among the sex workers are also prevalent although reports show that the problem is less severe than in the neighboring countries.

Law enforcement is corrupt. Police target foreigners who are with prostitutes, telling them it is illegal for two unmarried people of opposite sexes to be in the same hotel room, and then asking for a "fine". During police crack-downs, any single woman in a nightclub when raided is likely to be arrested as a prostitute.

Sex trafficking is a problem in Turkmenistan.

== Legislation ==
Turkmenistan's Criminal Code contains the following articles criminalising prostitution and related activities:

Article 138. The practice of prostitution

The repeated practice of prostitution in the course of a year after an administrative penalty has been imposed shall be punished by a fine amounting to 40 average monthly wages or corrective labour for a term of up to 2 years, or deprivation of liberty for a term of up to 2 years.

Article 139. Enticement into prostitution

(1) Enticement into prostitution shall be punished by corrective labour for a term of up to 2 years or deprivation of liberty for a term of up to 2 years.
(2) This act if carried out:

(a) Repeatedly;
(b) By a group of conspirators;
(c) In relation to a minor;
(d) With the use of physical violence or the threat of its use;
(e) With the use of blackmail or deceit;

shall be punished by deprivation of liberty for a term of between 3 and 8 years.

Article 140. Setting up or keeping of a brothel

(1) The setting up or keeping of a brothel shall be punished by deprivation of liberty for a term of up to 5 years, with or without the confiscation of property, with or without the imposition of a compulsory residence order for a term of between 2 and 5 years.
(2) These acts if committed repeatedly shall be punished by deprivation of liberty for a term of between 3 and 8 years, with or without the confiscation of property, with or without the imposition of a compulsory residence order for a term of between 2 and 5 years.

Article 141. Procuring

(1) Procuring for debauchery or prostitution shall be punished by deprivation of liberty for a term of up to 5 years, with or without the confiscation of property.
(2) This act if committed repeatedly shall be punished by deprivation of liberty for a term of between 3 and 8 years, with or without the confiscation of property.

Article 142. Pimping

(1) Pimping for profit-seeking motives, that is to say employing prostitutes for the purpose of their sexual exploitation, shall be punished by deprivation of liberty for a term of between 2 and 5 years, with or without the confiscation of property.
(2) This act if committed repeatedly shall be punished by deprivation of liberty for a term of between 3 and 8 years, with or without the confiscation of property.

== VIP entertainment ==
Under the presidency of Saparmurat Niyazov, a form of state prostitution was introduced. Good looking high school and university students were sent from the provinces to the capital, Ashgabat, to be trained to 'entertain' high-ranking officials and VIPs.

The students were chosen by local female officials. They had to be between 17 and 20, be tall, slim and have good hair and teeth. Once chosen, there was no refusing the 'honour'. Originally they could be of any ethnicity, but later only "pure-blood" Turkmen females were chosen.

Once in Ashgabat, they were trained in etiquette, polite manners, to set tableware and serve dishes. Those who did not make it as a "body" were used to service lower ranking officials at functions.

== Sex trafficking ==
Turkmenistan is a source country for women, and children subjected to sex trafficking. Turkmen women are subjected to sex trafficking abroad. Turkey, Russia, and India are the most frequent destinations of Turkmen victims, followed by other countries in the Middle East, South and Central Asia, and Europe. Residents of rural areas in Turkmenistan are most at risk of becoming trafficking victims, both within the country and abroad.

Article 129/1 of the criminal code, as amended in November 2016, defines trafficking in persons as acts done by force, fraud, or coercion, but it does not appear to include in its definition the purpose of the crime, which is exploitation. It also exempts trafficking victims from criminal responsibility for acts committed as a result of being trafficked. Article 129/1 prescribes penalties of 4 to 25 years imprisonment. Women under 35 are restricted from flying to Turkey or United Arab Emirates (UAE) in case prostitution is involved.

The United States Department of State Office to Monitor and Combat Trafficking in Persons ranks Turkmenistan as a 'Tier 3' country.

== See also ==
- Prostitution in the Soviet Union
