= Law enforcement in Turkmenistan =

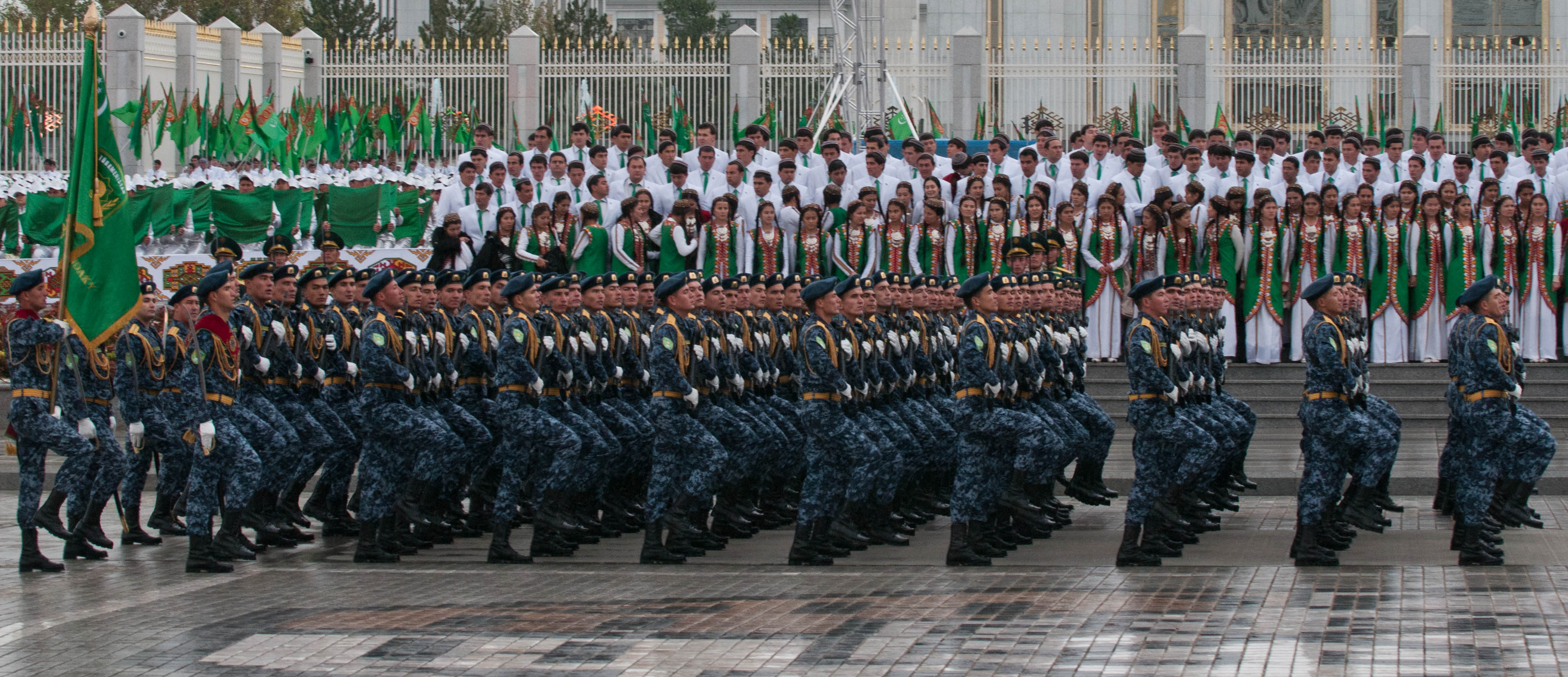
The Internal Troops of Turkmenistan.

Law enforcement in Turkmenistan is carried out by the Interior Ministry and the Ministry of National Security (KNB). The Interior Ministry commands the 25,000 personnel of the national police force directly, while the KNB deals with intelligence work. The criminal justice system is similar to the Soviet one. The KNB carries out similar work to the KGB of the Union of Soviet Socialist Republics, and works with the Federal Intelligence Service of Russia (having signed a contract with them in 1994). The ministry, as the Soviet predecessor, controls the police, which have offices in major cities throughout the country. On the international level, the Interior Ministry and KNB work to combat drug trafficking and organized crime.

== Law enforcement organizations ==
- Ministry of Internal Affairs
- Ministry for National Security
- Turkmen National Police
