= Christopher M. Schroeder =

American businessman

Christopher M. Schroeder (born July 28, 1967) is an American entrepreneur, advisor, author, and investor in interactive technologies and social communications.

== Early life and education ==
Schroeder was born on the Lower East Side of Manhattan, and raised in Scarsdale. His parents are Edmund R. Schroeder (formerly of Cadwalader) and Elaine Diserio Schroeder. Edmund Schroeder is the founder of Education Through Music, which offers music programs to inner city schools. Elaine Schroeder began college at age 14 and Fordham Law School at 18, and practiced law in New York City. His mother was active in, and chairman of, the Caramoor Center for Music and the Arts in Katonah, New York.

Schroeder graduated magna cum laude from Harvard College in American and Ancient History (where he studied with Lincoln scholar David Herbert Donald) and international diplomacy historian Ernest R. May. He subsequently graduated with honors from Harvard Business School. Schroeder worked in finance for Salomon Brothers and the private equity firm Thayer Capital Partners, and was Treasurer and head of business development for The Washington Post Company.

== Career ==
=== Investing & technology ===
Schroeder became CEO and President of Legi-Slate, Inc., an online B2B provider of information on federal and state legislation and regulation, which he sold to The Washington Post in 1999. He then was named CEO and Publisher of washingtonpost.newsweek interactive.

He later joined an investor group including Polaris Ventures, Sequoia Capital, The Carlyle Group, Allen & Company LLC, and Interactive Corp (IAC) to become co-founder and CEO of HealthCentral, among the largest collection of condition and wellness-specific interactive experiences focused on people finding and sharing real-life experiences related to their health needs. HealthCentral was named one of the Inc 500/5000 fastest growing private companies in the United States. HealthCentral was sold to Remedy Health in 2012.

Schroeder has been an active angel investing and advising. He is a limited partner in a Silicon Valley venture capital firm, and has invested in and advised many start-ups in his related areas including Vox Media, Skift Media, Ibotta, and the fin tech enterprise in mobile money in Africa Segovia, on whose board he sits. He is on the investment committee of Wamda Capital, one of the largest venture capital firms in the Middle East and North Africa.

Schroeder has been a thought leader and organizer in various internet organizations. He was one of the first board members of the Interactive Advertising Bureau, a co-founder of the Online Publishers Association, now called Digital Content Next, and founding member of the Digital Health Coalition. He was one of the first interactive executives named to the American Advertising Federation (AAF) Hall of Achievement, among the top tech business executives to watch by Business Forward Magazine, Media Magazine and Washingtonian Magazine. He was named PharmaVOICE's Top 100 Most Inspiring People in Life Sciences and one of the first 50 Influencers on Linkedin.

Schroeder has been a speaker on trends in global entrepreneurship for many years such as the COE 2010 gathering of regional entrepreneurs and investors in Dubai, Endeavor's gathering of global entrepreneurs and the Abraaj Capital annual meeting. He has addressed the IMF and the World Government Summit in Dubai on these issues and recently gave a TED related talk in New York City. He is a member of the Board of Directors of the American University of Beirut, the American Council on Germany and the German Marshall Fund and the board of Advisors of the American University of Cairo School of Business, The American University School of International Service, Endeavor Global and The Global Entrepreneurship Network, and advises the Inter-American Development Bank on issues of technology and entrepreneurship. He is a member of the Council on Foreign Relations.

He has written and spoken extensively on trends in media, the internet and global environment for The Washington Post, Newsweek, Wall Street Journal, AllThingsD, Fortune Magazine, C-SPAN and TechCrunch. He has appeared on Charlie Rose and Fareed Zakaria's 360 to talk about the Middle East and global startups. He is the author of Startup Rising: The Entrepreneurial Revolution Remaking the Middle East, released in August 2013.

=== Public policy, politics, and business ===
Schroeder served in leading management roles in President George Bush’s 1988 and 1992 election campaigns, and worked on Secretary of State James A. Baker's staff with then Under Secretary (and recent President of the World Bank) Robert Zoellick. He has supported and advised other centrist political candidates in policy and internet and global entrepreneurship related issues.

He has served in the advisory gathering for the Small Business Administration's efforts to support entrepreneurship leading to Startup America, and the Brookings entrepreneurship committee for their annual gathering on US Islam relations. In 2016, he co-led an initiative of the Atlantic Council, under former Secretary of State Madeleine Albright and National Security Advisor Steve Hadley, The Middle East Strategic Task Force's efforts on Economic Recovery and Revitalization.

He is an active member of the Young Presidents Organization and involved in an offshoot group building connections between the US and Middle East CEOs and entrepreneurs.

== Personal life ==
Schroeder is married to Alexandra Coburn, whom he met at Harvard. They have three children.

Schroeder has been a judge for the Mitchell Scholarship, The French-American Foundation's Young Leaders program and The American Council on Germany Hunt Fellowship.

He advises the National Gallery of Art on Internet issues and communications and has been involved with the Arena Stage, National Cathedral School, and Harvard.
