= Global Methane Pledge =

International climate initiative

- Formation: November 2021
- Founders: United States, European Union
- Type: International environmental initiative
- Purpose: Reduce global methane emissions
- Website: www.globalmethanepledge.org

The Global Methane Pledge is an international initiative announced in 2021 that seeks to reduce global emissions of methane. The initiative was proposed by the United States and the European Union ahead of the United Nations Climate Change Conference (COP26) held in Glasgow.

== Terms and signatories ==
Under the initiative, participating countries aim to collectively reduce global methane emissions by at least 30 percent from 2020 levels by 2030.

At the time of its launch at COP26 in 2021, more than 100 countries joined the Global Methane Pledge that agreed to work toward reducing global methane emissions by 30 percent by 2030.

== Implementation ==
The initiative is voluntary and is intended to be implemented through national policies aimed at reducing methane emissions in sectors including energy, agriculture, and waste management.

A 2024 report by the United Nations stated that many countries and companies are lagging in their response to methane emissions. Bloomberg reported in 2025 that global efforts remain off course to meet the pledge's target of reducing methane emissions by 2030.

== See also ==
- EU Methane Regulation
- Climate change mitigation
- Greenhouse gas emissions
