= Constitution of Turkmenistan =

Supreme law of Turkmenistan

- Official version of the Constitution of Turkmenistan

Assembly of Turkmenistan
- Territorial extent: Turkmenistan
- Enacted: 18 May 1992
- Signed by: Citizens of Turkmenistan
- Status: In force

The Constitution of Turkmenistan (Turkmen: Türkmenistanyň Konstitusiýasy) adopted on 18 May 1992 is the supreme law of Turkmenistan (Article 5). In its preamble, the Constitution emphasizes self-determination for the Turkmen people, as well as the rule of law and rights for citizens. (See also Human rights in Turkmenistan).

The 1992 constitution was amended in 1995, 1999, 2003 and 2006. It was amended on 26 September 2008, abolishing the 2,500-member People's Council (Halk Maslahaty) and expanding the elected Assembly (Mejlis) from 65 to 125 members. A new constitution was adopted on 14 September, 2016. State Flag and Constitution Day is celebrated on 18 May.

== Constitution of the Turkmen SSR ==
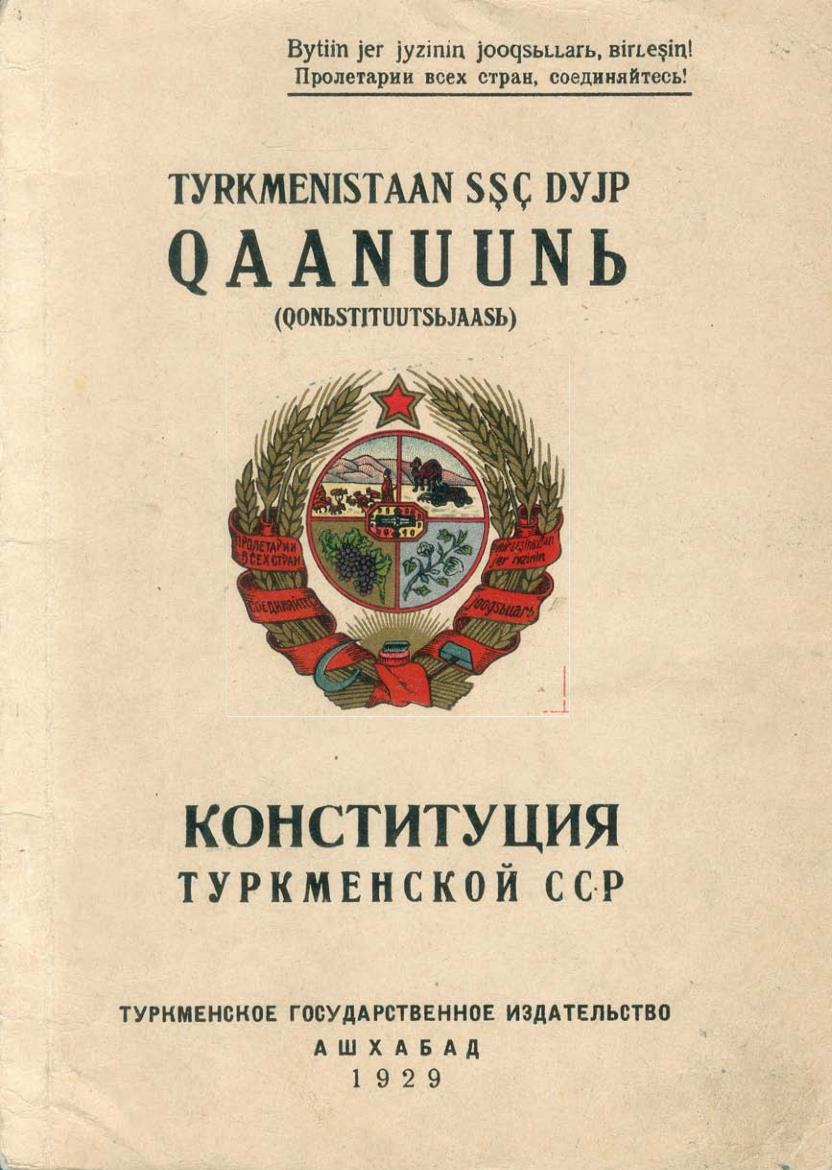
Constitution of the Turkmen SSR, 1929

There were three Constitutions of the Turkmen Soviet Socialist Republic, enacted in 1927, 1937, and 1978. The last was superseded by the modern Constitution of Turkmenistan, which came into force in 1992. It has since been amended in 2008 and 2016.

== Overview ==
=== Section 1 ===
Section 1 of the 2008 Constitution is composed of 17 articles (15 articles in the 1992 Constitution). Article 1 describes Turkmenistan as a secular democracy and presidential republic. The sovereignty and the territorial integrity of the state are inviolable and indivisible. Article 3 proclaims individual rights and dignity as a value protected by the state. Article 8 states that foreign residents and persons without citizenship enjoy the same rights as the citizens of Turkmenistan subject to existing laws and international agreements. Among the rights specifically enumerated are the right to property (article 9) and freedom of religion (article 12; article 11 in the 1992 Constitution).

Article 4 endorses a separation of powers, including judicial independence. Article 14 (13 in the 1992 Constitution) establishes the Turkmen language as the official language and article 17 (15 in the 1992 Constitution) confirms Ashgabat as the capital city.

Two new articles added in the 2008 Constitution declare the state's commitment to the market economy, including encouragement of small and medium-sized business (Article 10), and specify the administrative division of the country into welayats (provinces), cities with the status of welayat, etraps (districts), towns with etrap status, towns in an etrap, and villages of different levels (Article 16, supersedes Article 47 in the 1992 Constitution).

=== Section 2 ===
Section 2 outlines rights of individuals and citizens. Civil and political rights include equality rights (article 19; 1992:17), sex equality (article 20; 1992:18), freedom from cruel and unusual punishment (article 23; 1992:21), and freedom of movement (article 26; 1992:24). Social and economic rights include the right to work (article 33; 1992:31), the right to rest (article 34; 1992:32), and the right to education (article 38; 1992:35). Other social rights include the right to health care, the right to old-age pension, and the right to disability benefits (articles 35, 37; 1992:33, 34). A new article added in the 2008 Constitution (article 36) establishes the right to environmental quality and charges the state with the responsibility for preserving natural resources and protecting the environment.

Article 21 (1992:19) states that the exercise of individual rights and freedoms should not impinge on the rights and freedoms of other individuals and can be limited by considerations of morality, law, and public order. Article 22 declares that everybody has the right to life and that capital punishment is abolished in Turkmenistan. The 1992 Constitution allowed capital punishment, but only for "the heaviest of crimes" (article 20), and this provision was subsequently annulled by a 1999 presidential decree that abolished capital punishment. Finally, Section 2 lists some obligations on citizens, including serving in the military (article 41; 1992:38) and paying taxes (article 42; 1992:39).

=== Section 3 ===
Section 3 describes the organs of government in Turkmenistan. The state power is vested with the President, the Mejlis (Parliament or Assembly), the Cabinet of Ministers, and the Supreme Court of Turkmenistan (Article 48). The People's Council of Turkmenistan (Halk Maslahaty), which figured prominently in the 1992 Constitution (Chapter 2 of Section 3), was abolished in the 2008 Constitution.

Articles 50-58 of the 2008 Constitution (54-61 of the 1992 Constitution) describe the powers of the President of Turkmenistan. The President is the head of state and also the head of government (Article 50). The President is in charge of Turkmenistan's foreign policy and is the country's commander-in-chief (Article 53). In addition to signing laws enacted by Mejlis, he may issue Presidential decrees that have the power of law in Turkmenistan (Article 54).
