= Military Band Service of the Armed Forces of Turkmenistan =

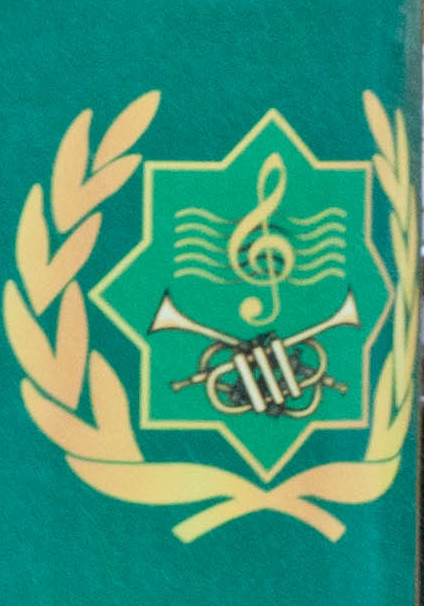
- The logo of the band.
- Active: 1992; 34 years ago
- Country: Turkmenistan
- Branch: Armed Forces of Turkmenistan
- Type: Military Band Service
- Size: 49 (standard band); 200 (combined bands)
- Part of: Turkmen Ground Forces
- Garrison/HQ: Ashgabat

Commanders
- Senior Director of Music/Commander: Colonel Azamat Achylovich Avliyakulyev
- Notable commanders: Major Muhammet Akmuhammedowyň; Major Nurygandym Khodzhamukhammedov (former Chief Composer)

The Military Band Service of the Armed Forces of Turkmenistan is the primary military band organization of the Armed Forces of Turkmenistan. Many of the members of bands have attended the Turkmen National Conservatory. It is organized under the command of the Ministry of Defense of Turkmenistan.

Bands in the service are affiliated with the following units:

- Ashgabat Garrison
- Türkmenabat Garrison
- Serdar Garrison
- Ahal Garrison
- Mary Garrison
- Central Commanders' House
- Military Institute of the Ministry of Defense

The Armed Forces Exemplary Band (Turkmen: Türkmenistanyň Ýaragly Güýçleriniň «Göreldeli» harby orkestriniň; known officially as Military Unit 20016) was formed in 1992 in Ashgabat based on the Band of the 52nd Army of the Soviet Union's Turkestan Military District.

== Role of the Göreldeli Band in the Turkmen Armed Forces ==
The band's task is purely ceremonial in purpose, with its primary role being to play the State Anthem of Turkmenistan during solemn occasions. It is similar in style to college marching bands in the United States, as well as marching bands located in Russia. The massed bands of the military band service are notable for their finale performance at military parades in the capital, in which they work together to form specific shapes and Turkmen symbols.

The band takes part in the following events:

- The band also takes part in state welcoming ceremonies with the guard of honour at the Oguzkhan Presidential Palace and the defense ministry.
- Turkmen Independence Day Parade
- Awards ceremonies hosted by the President of Turkmenistan in honor of distinguished Turkmen citizens.
- Graduation ceremonies at military academies
- Concerts involving the band with, on some occasions, foreign military bands and or Turkmen singers/artists.
- Public musical festivals and military tattoos held on Turkmen and foreign soil.

The band performed at the first Victory Day Parade in the country in 2020, on the occasion of the 75th anniversary of the defeat of Nazi Germany. During the parade, it performed traditional Russian pieces such as Den Pobedy, Katyusha, and The Sacred War.

The band is led by Major Muhammet Akmuhammedowyň.

=== Holidays ===
- January 28 – Defender of the Fatherland Day
- May 9 – Victory Day
- May 18 – State Flag and Constitution Day
- September 27 – Independence Day
- October 6 – Day of Commemoration and National Mourning
- October 9 – Day of the Navy

== Instrumentation ==
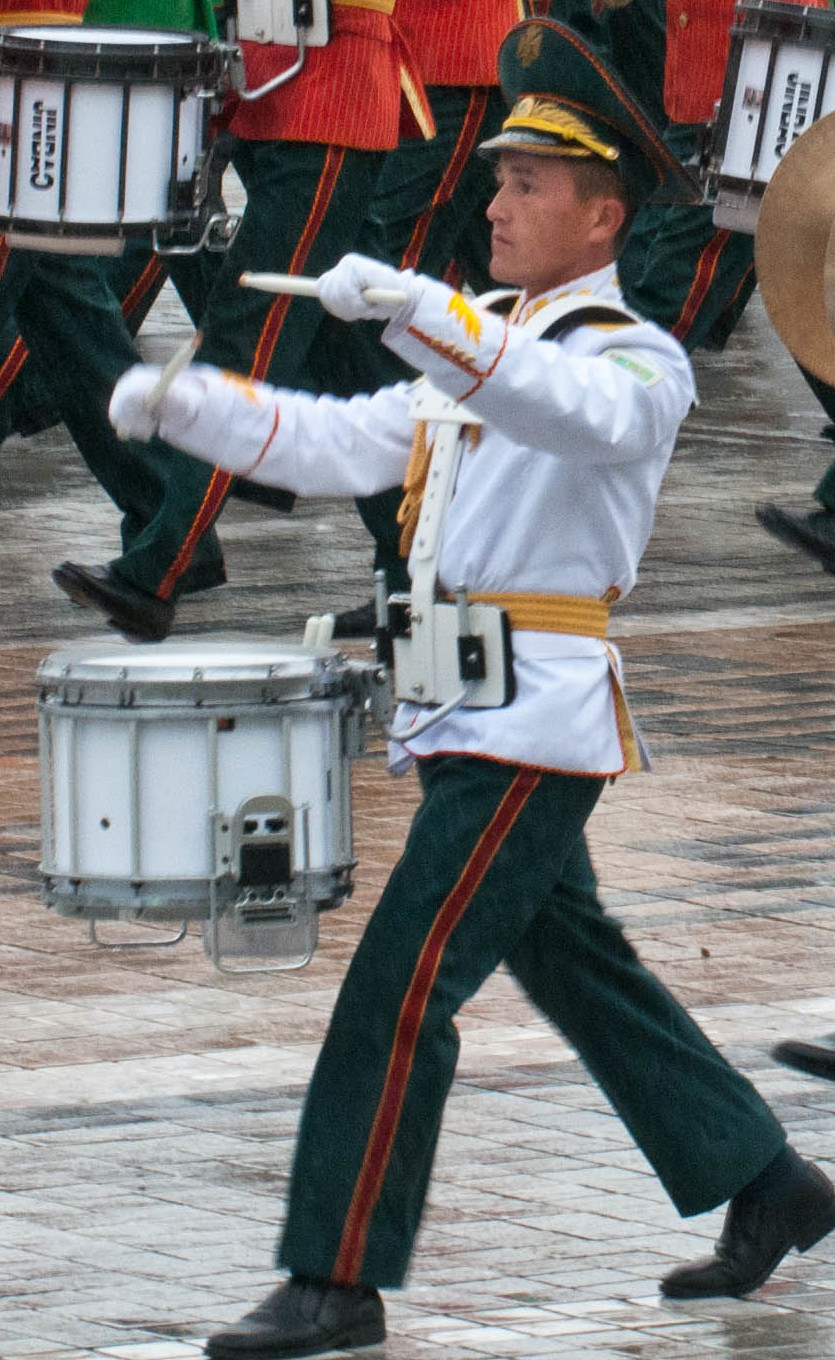
A Turkmen drummer in Ashgabat. The White tunic that the drummer is wearing is one of three known uniforms of the band service, with the other two being Orange and Green.

The combined bands, as well as the individual bands in the service are different from their Russian and Central Asian counterparts in that they put wind instruments such as the Clarinet in the front of the band, whereas other bands in the region prioritizes trumpets over others. Inspired by U.S. college bands, the band maintains a group of musicians with Tenor drums and Cymbal who are arranged in a formation similar to Drumlines. Other than traditional brass and wind instruments, the band also uses traditional Turkmen instruments, such as the Dutar and the Gijak. These instruments allow it to perform traditional music such as Kushtdepdi.

Some of the ceremonial music that the service utilizes includes the Presidential Fanfare, Niyazov's Honour March and Slow March of the Turkmen Flag (usually played during military parades during a flag procession). Öňe, diňe öňe, jan Watanym Türkmenistan, which was penned by President Gurbanguly Berdimuhamedow, is also in the band's repertoire.

== Gallery ==
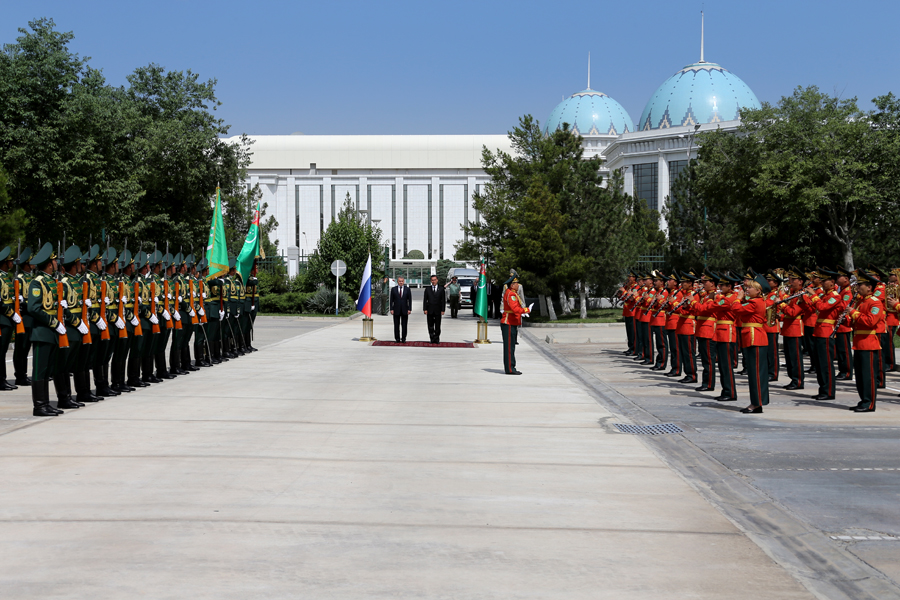
A welcoming ceremony for Sergey Shoigu at the Turkmen defense ministry. Notice the band in their orange tunics on the right.

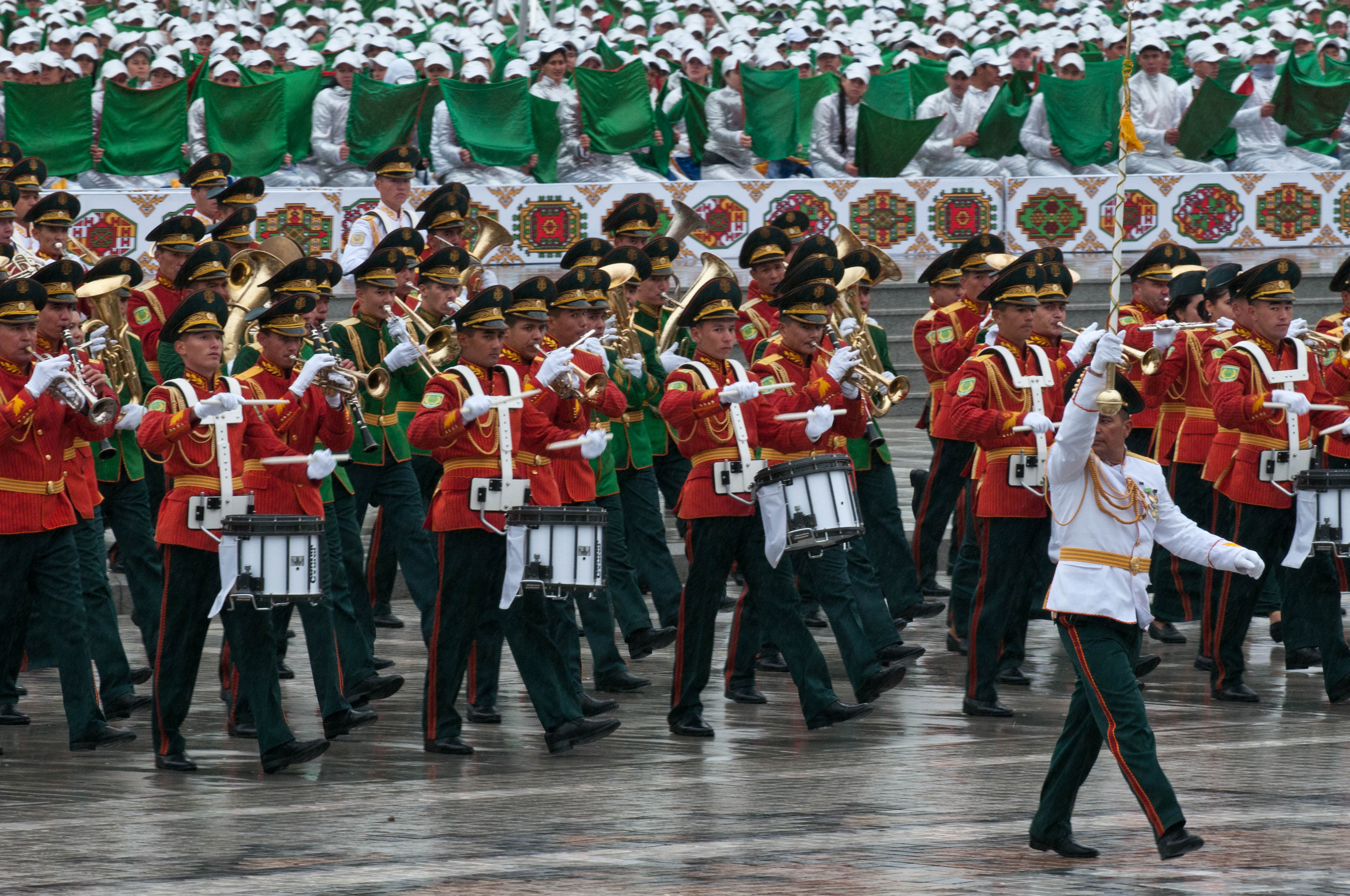
The band in the 2011 Turkmen Independence Day Parade.

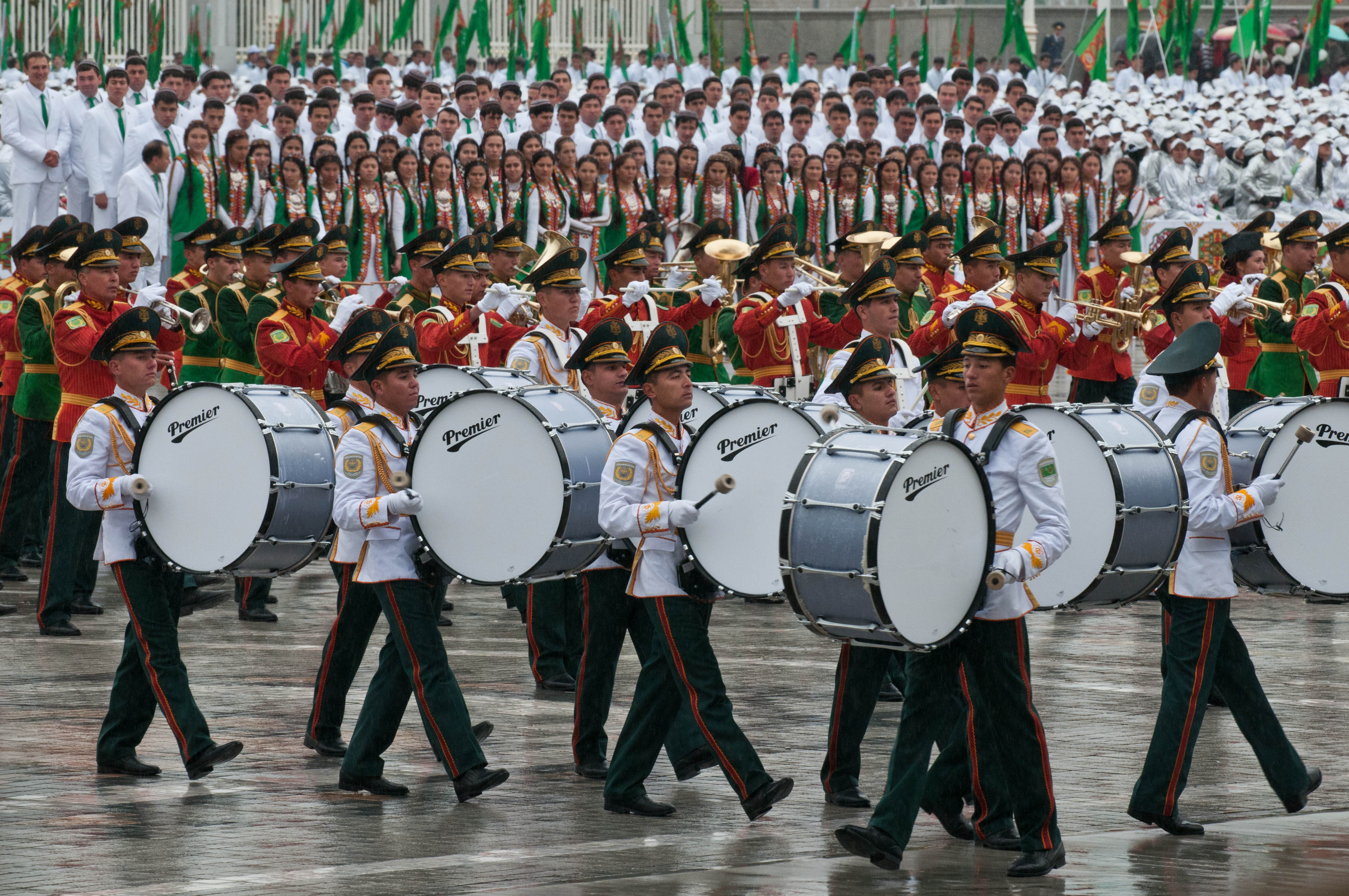

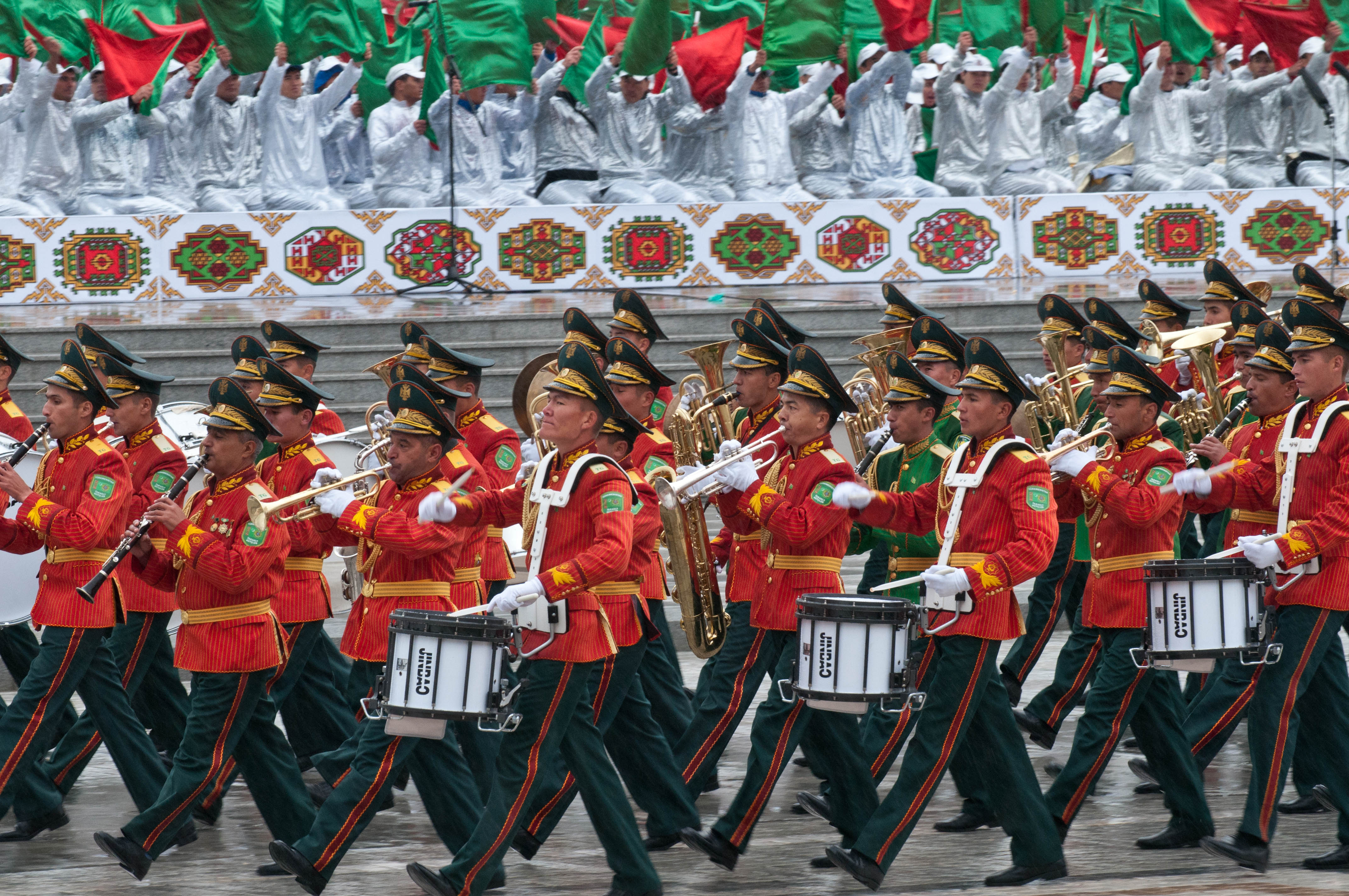

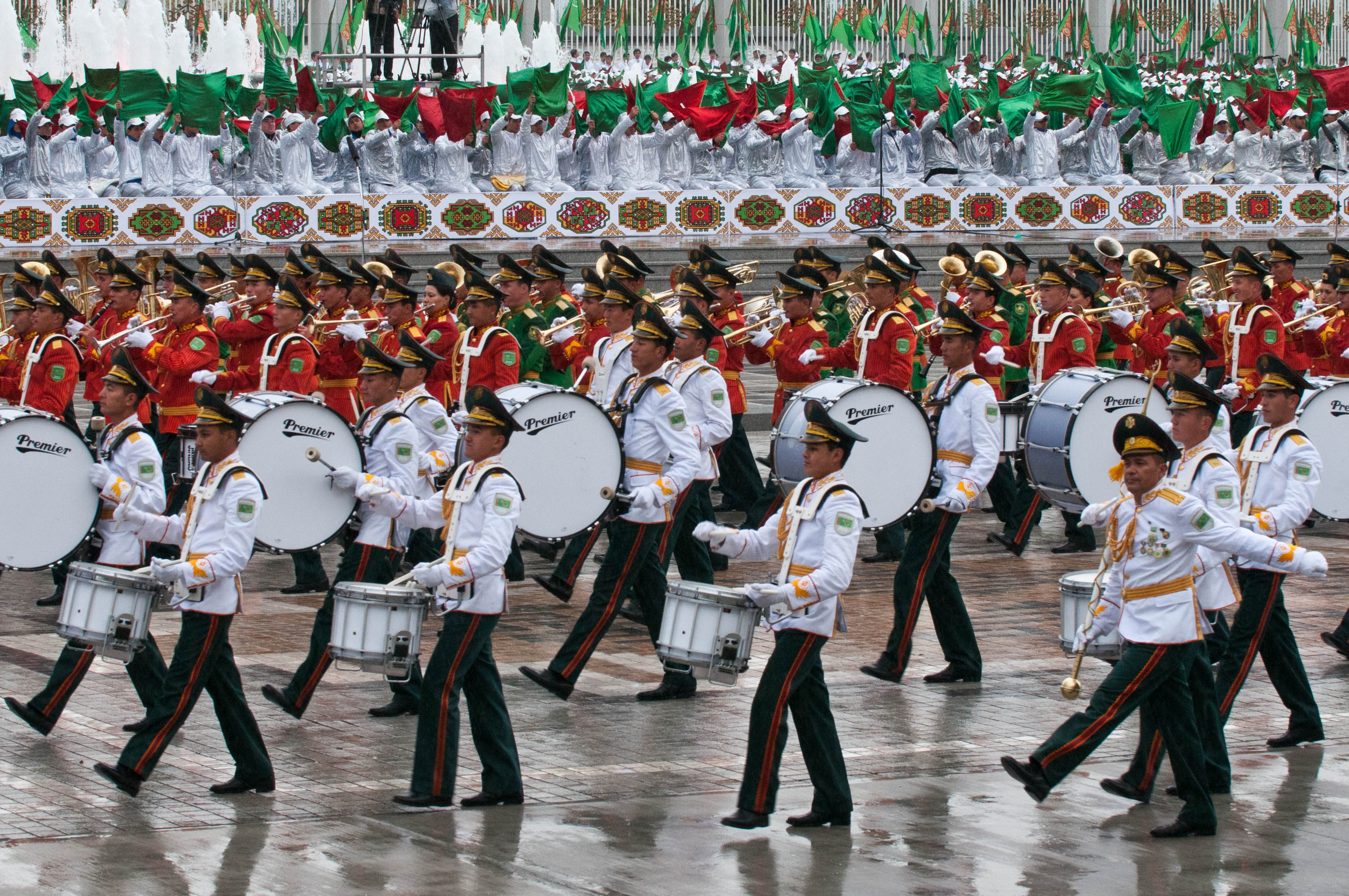

== See also ==
- Military Band Service (Kazakhstan)
- Band of the Ministry of Defense of the Republic of Uzbekistan
- Independent Honor Guard Battalion of the Ministry of Defence of Turkmenistan

== Audio ==
- Slow March
- Slow March of the Turkmen Flag
- Turkmen Presidential Fanfare
