= Idol (stallion) =

Soviet military horse

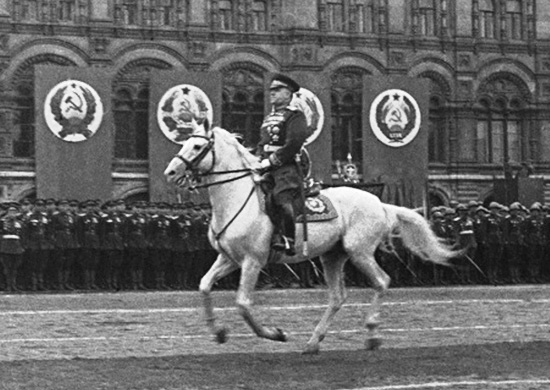
- Zhukov and Idol during the opening moments of the 1945 parade.

Idol (Russian: Кумир; c. 1941–c. 1948) was a gray horse that lived during the Soviet era and the Second World War, which was notable for being the horse in which Marshal of the Soviet Union Georgy Zhukov presided over the Moscow Victory Parade of 1945 on Red Square, the first of its kind in Russian military history.

== Life ==
It was born in the Tersk Stud Farm, the Arab-Kabarda horse breed complex in 1941. One of the first parades it took part in was the 1941 October Revolution Parade on 7 November.

=== Victory Parade ===
The idea of having a horse being ridden at the inaugural victory parade was that of Marshal Joseph Stalin. He also ordered that it be a white horse, which was a unique case in the history of Soviet military parades. He had previously reprimanded Marshal Semyon Budyonny for the fact that various marshals host parades on Red Square on the same horse. Searches were made for horses first in the Stable of the People's Commissariat of Defense of the Soviet Union. Idol was eventually chosen after a search of the Dzerzhinsky Division. They looked for a horse all over the country for close to a week before settling on Idol. Zhukov began riding him immediately, rehearsing with him for an entire month before the parade.

At exactly ten o'clock in the morning of 24 June, on the first blow of the striking clock of the Moscow Kremlin, Marshal Zhukov rode Idol from the gates of the Spasskaya Tower. He was accompanied, also on a white horse named Celebes, by the adjutant Colonel Pyotr Zelensky. They headed to the central part of the square in front of Lenin's Mausoleum, to which Marshal Konstantin Rokossovsky, on his horse named Pole and accompanied by his adjutant on a horse named Eaglet, gave the official report. After completing the inspection, Zhukov quickly dismounted and, patting his horse in the neck, went to the podium of the mausoleum.

=== Post-parade ===
After the ceremony, on the night of 24 June, Zhukov went to Berlin to resume his command. After the parade, Idol was sent back to the NKVD cavalry regiment. After three years, Budyonny was ordered to find a horse for the International Workers' Day parade in 1948. By that time, it was reported that Idol had died.

== Legacy ==
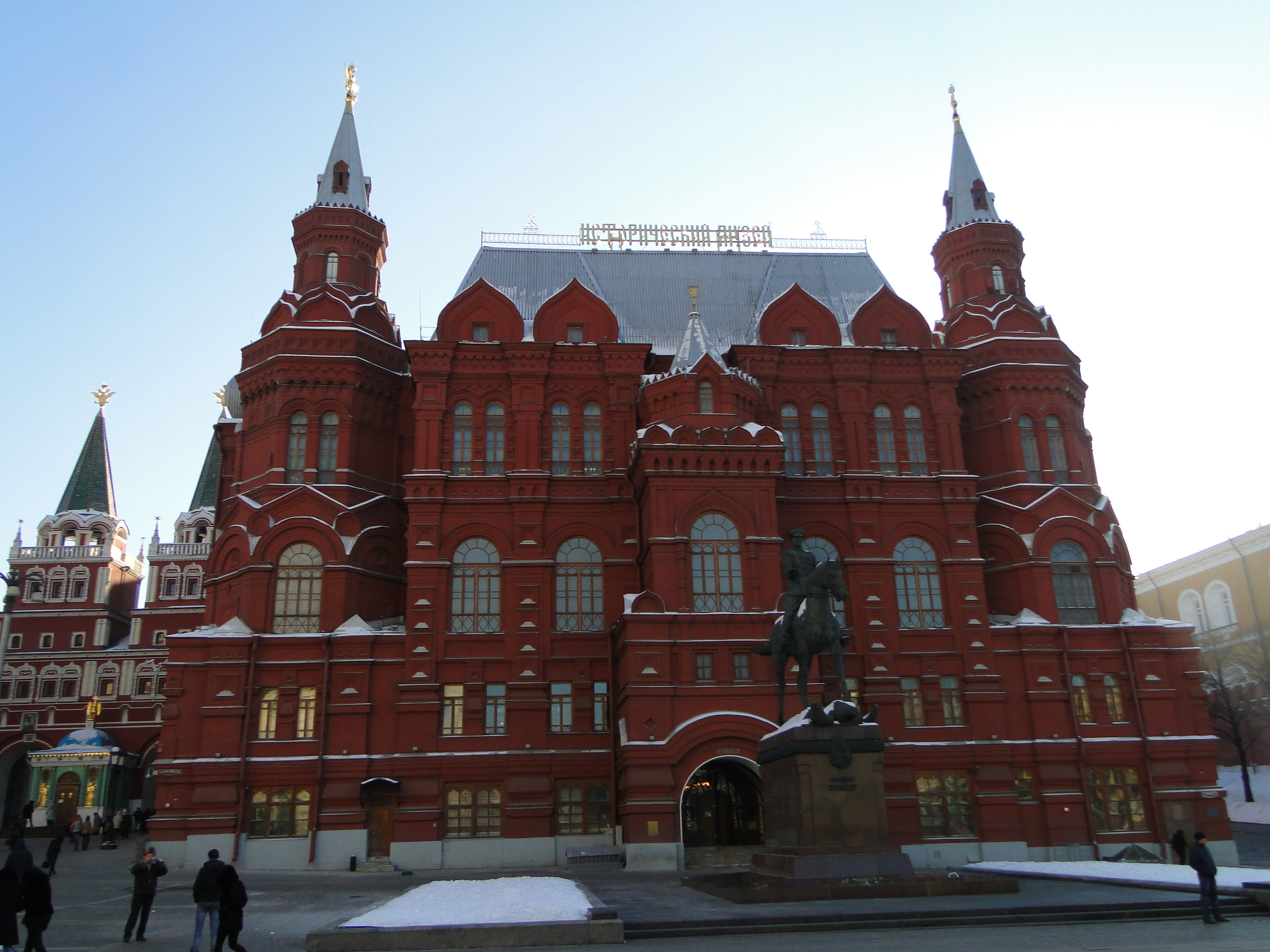
The monument in Moscow.

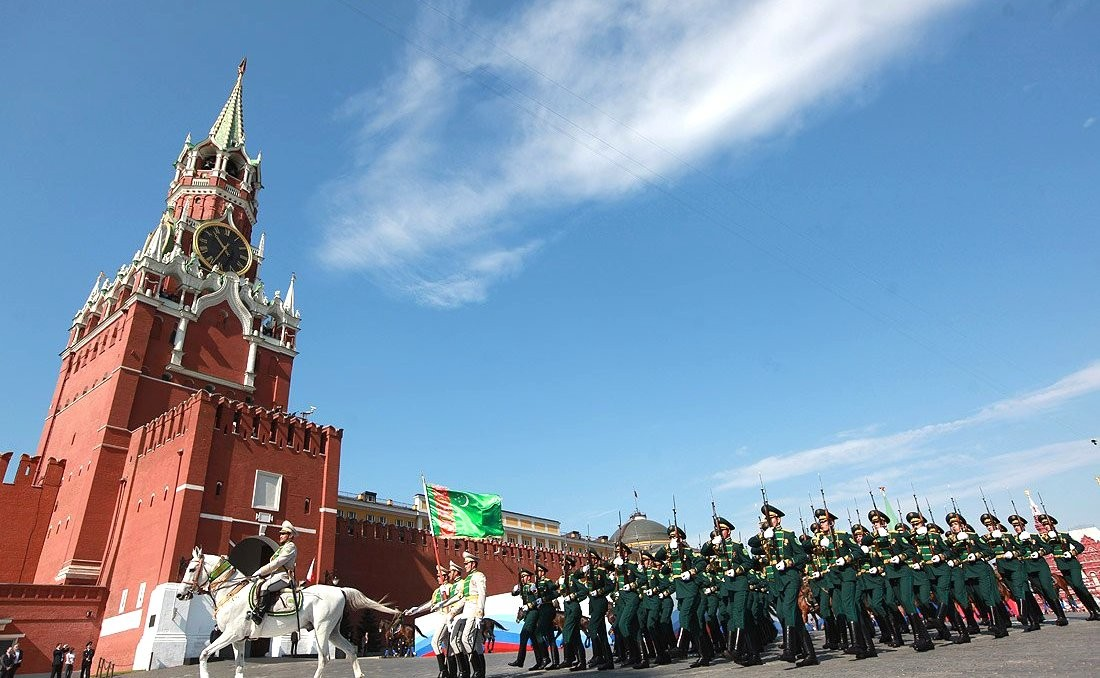
A descendant of Idol (with Major Pygy Baýramdurdyýew riding) leading the Honor Guard Battalion of Turkmenistan during the 2010 Moscow Victory Day Parade.

- A statue of Zhukov on his parade horse is located near the State Historical Museum on Manezhnaya Square. There was an original debate over where to place the statue, with many saying that it should be located at the site of the parade, Red Square. The sculptor and architect are Vyacheslav Klykov and Y. Grigorev respectively.
- During the 2010 Moscow Victory Day Parade, the contingent from Turkmenistan, upon request from the government of Turkmenistan, was led by an officer riding on horseback, with the horse being a descendant of the Idol. This has however received much pushback, particularly by historians and participants in the parade, who saw a significant difference in breeds. The horse would later reappear on Ashgabat's central square that October, being the first to appear in the Turkmen Independence Day Parade.
- On 24 June 2020, during the Victory Parade in the South Ossetian capital of Tskhinvali, the equestrian team from the Border Administration of the Russian FSB took part for the first time in history, with the equestrian ranks being led by a border guard officer on a stallion called Brilliant, a direct descendant of Idol, according to the local authorities.

== See also ==
- United States Cavalry
- Klinger (horse)
- Cavalry corps (Soviet Union)

== Sources ==
- Shtemenko, S. M. (1989). General Staff during the War (in Russian). Moscow: Voenizdat. ISBN 9785203004918.
