= Turkmen Independence Day Parade =

Main events celebrating the Independence of Turkmenistan

Turkmen Independence Day Parade Türkmenistanyň Garaşsyzlyk baýramy harby parad (ýöriş)
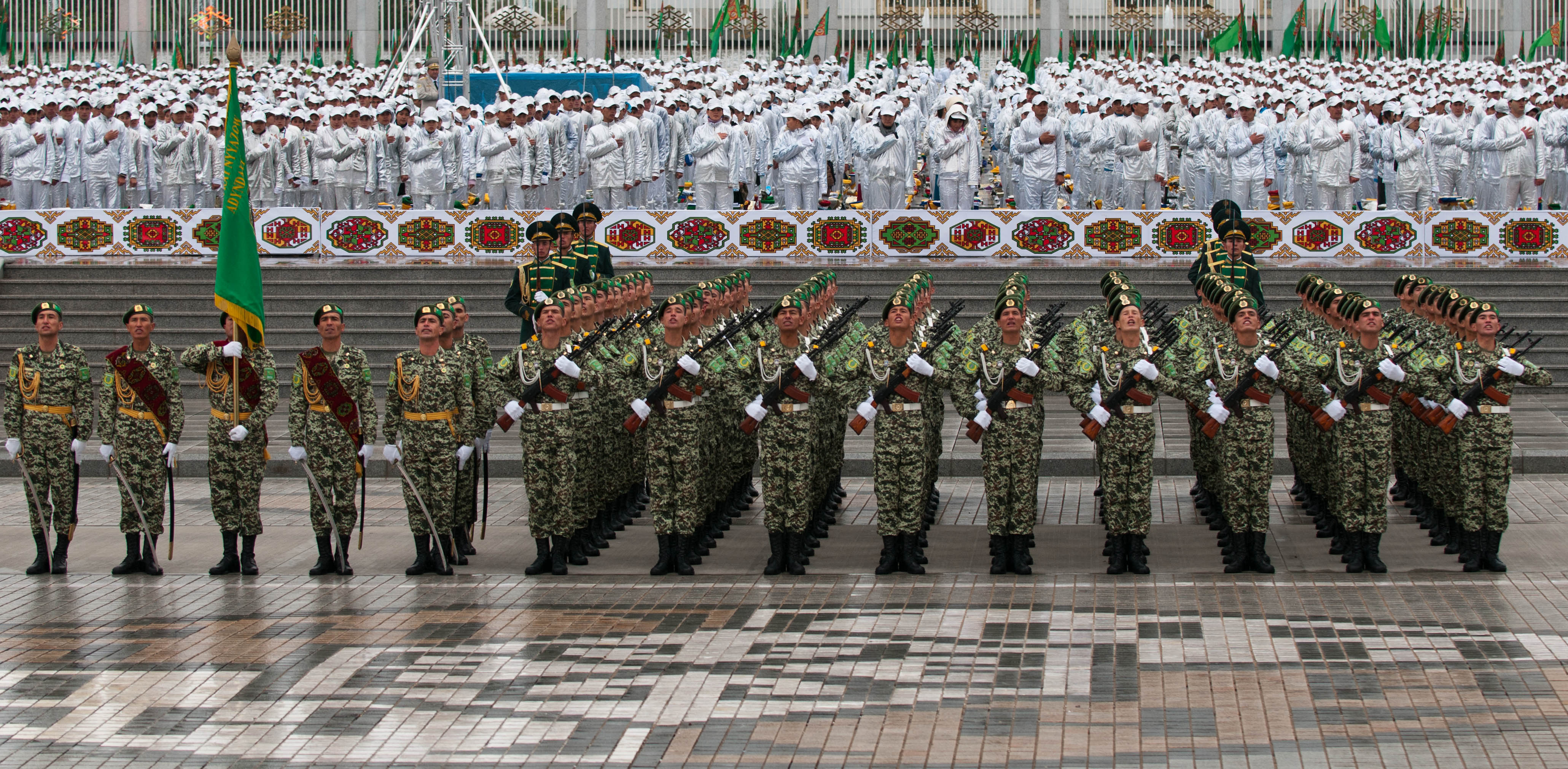
- The parade in 2011
- Genre: Military parade
- Dates: 27 October (1992–2017); 27 September (2018–present)
- Begins: 10:00 AM
- Frequency: Annual
- Venue: Makhtumkuli Avenue (1992–1997); Independence Square (1997–present)
- Location: Ashgabat
- Country: Turkmenistan
- Inaugurated: 1992
- Previous event: 2025
- Next event: 2026
- Organiser: Ministry of Defense of Turkmenistan

The Turkmen Independence Day Parade is one of the main events celebrating the Independence of Turkmenistan from the Soviet Union in 1991. Independence Day is the main holiday of Turkmenistan. The parade is held in Ashgabat, Turkmenistan every year and is the largest and most frequent military parade in Central Asia.

== The parade in full detail ==
The President of Turkmenistan arrives on Independence Square at 10:00AM to the tune of the Presidential Fanfare. The president watches proceedings from the first-floor balcony of the Ceremony Field and Protocol Building, while diplomats and officials watch from below. The Minister of Defense first reports to the president on the status of the parade before heading to his white Rolls-Royce Phantom Drophead Coupé inspection vehicle while the parade commander (usually the Deputy Defense Minister or the Chief of the General Staff) gives the order to begin the review of the Ashgabat Garrison. The PC then gives his report on the parade's status to the minister before they both conduct a pass-in-review of the troops. While this happens, the troops sound a three-fold hurray until the minister finishes his/her inspection. After this is done, the national anthem of Turkmenistan is played by the massed bands of the Military Band Service of the Armed Forces of Turkmenistan and a combined choir. While this happens, a flag raising ceremony is also held on the square. The troops will then take an oath of allegiance to Turkmenistan, the Turkmen people, and the president.

The parade commander, following the pledge taking, then gives the command to commence the parade proper as the markers take their places. Once the parade is ordered to begin, the Color Guard of the Independent Honor Guard Battalion of the Ministry of Defence of Turkmenistan starts to march down the square, followed by the Corps of Drums of the Berdimuhamed Annayev 1st Specialized Military School and the Military Institute of the Ministry of Defense, following by the units and formations of the Turkmen Ground Forces, Air Force, Naval Forces (Naval Institute and Marine Battalion), Internal Troops, State Border Service, and the Ministry for National Security. While marching, the servicemen chant the phrase "the people, the homeland, and the great Supreme Commander-in-Chief!" After this is done, vehicles are then paraded across the square with military aviation flying overhead. At the conclusion of the parade, a drill team from the Independent Honor Guard Battalion of the Ministry of Defence and the massed bands and corps of drums of the military band service perform an exhibition drill. The military parade is followed by the mass procession of representatives of the five Regions of Turkmenistan (Ahal, Balkan, Dashoguz, Lebap and Mary), the capital of Ashgabat, as well as workers in various branches of Turkmenistan's economy.

== Timeline of notable anniversary parades since 1992 ==
Parades have been held annually since 1997:

Year	Anniversary	Venue	President	Notes
1993	2nd	Makhtumkuli Avenue	Saparmurat Niyazov	It was the first military parade to be held since the fall of the USSR. The parade took place on Makhtumkuli Avenue in Ashgabat and was commanded by Minister of Defence, Colonel General Dangatar Kopekov as well as Annamurat Soltanov. Ismail Khan was one of the dignitaries in attendance.
1997	6th	Independence Square, Ashgabat	Saparmurat Niyazov	
2001	10th	Independence Square, Ashgabat	Saparmurat Niyazov	It was the last event to be held out of the 10-day celebrations to be held earlier that week. A similar parade was also held on Day of Neutrality that December.
2003	12th	Independence Square, Ashgabat	Saparmurat Niyazov	The troops marched in new uniforms for the first time.
2007	16th	Independence Square, Ashgabat	Gurbanguly Berdimuhamedow	It was the first one for the newly elected president of Turkmenistan Gurbanguly Berdimuhamedow. The parade featured a column of officers selected for their merit and a motor rifle battalion that excelled at the Galkan-2007 tactical exercise. It was also the first parade of cadets of the Military Academy of Turkmenistan.
2010	19th	Independence Square, Ashgabat	Gurbanguly Berdimuhamedow	It also paid homage to the 65th anniversary of the Soviet victory in the Great Patriotic War, with a rider in military uniform riding on the Akhal-Teke horse that descended from the horse used by Marshal Georgy Zhukov during a parade in 1945 being the first to appear on the square. The horse had led the Honor Guard Battalion on Red Square during the 2010 Moscow Victory Day Parade earlier that May. A civil defense contingent marched on the square for the first time.
2011	20th	Independence Square, Ashgabat	Gurbanguly Berdimuhamedow	It celebrated the 20th anniversary of independence. A separate parade was also held at Köpetdag Stadium on top of Independence Square. During the parade, President Berdimuhamedow was given the honorific title of Arkadag ("The Protector") for the first time. They were both commanded by Colonel Kairam Bairamov.
2015	24th	Independence Square, Ashgabat	Gurbanguly Berdimuhamedow	The parade was inspected by Defense Minister Yaylym Berdiyev.
2016	25th	Independence Square, Ashgabat	Gurbanguly Berdimuhamedow	It celebrated the silver jubilee of independence. The President of Turkmenistan and Defense Minister Berdiyev both inspected the parade in white Mercedes while the troops chanted "Glory to Independent Turkmenistan!" as they both passed by. The parade also was commanded by the deputy defense minister, Colonel Shadurdi Durdiev. The parade demonstrated Chinese-made surface-to-air missile systems, and new unmanned air vehicles.
2017	26th	Independence Square, Ashgabat	Gurbanguly Berdimuhamedow	The newest infantry fighting vehicles, such as self-propelled artillery towed guns, surface-to-air missiles and reactive artillery complexes BM-21 Grad and Orbiter 3B vehicles were participants in the parade for the first time. The parade was commanded by Lieutenant Colonel Ayazov.
2018	27th	Independence Square, Ashgabat	Gurbanguly Berdimuhamedow	It was the first parade held since independence day was moved to 27 September. It marked the introduction of "Halk, Watan, Serkerdebashi" (People, Motherland, Commander-in-Chief) slogan during the parade festivities, reminiscent of the former "People, Homeland, Turkmenbashi" slogan.
2019	28th	Independence Square, Ashgabat	Gurbanguly Berdimuhamedow	It was the first parade in which female siblings (Captains Shirin and Aknabat Velikurbanov) took part in the parade as part of the same contingent. The contingent in question was led by Major Nabat Nurgeldyeva, who was in her 16th parade. Dowamly, a horse that was born in 2017 and presented to President Berdimuhamedow, was shown at the parade for the first time.
2020	29th	Independence Square, Ashgabat	Gurbanguly Berdimuhamedow	President Berdimuhamedow was expected to receive the parade on the new grandstand, which was built by the French company Bouygues. It was scheduled to be completed in August, however in April construction work were suspended due to COVID-19. Because of the pandemic, the parade was the only event held on 27 September. Some streets of Ashgabat were fully or partially closed in connection with the rehearsals of the military parade on 18 September.
2021	30th	South Ashgabat	Gurbanguly Berdimuhamedow	The parade of 2021 marked the 30th anniversary of national independence. In preparation for the jubilee, Berdimuhamedow in September 2020 ordered the start of preliminary parade designs, saying that the "jubilee military parade should reflect the achievements of our country and the patriotic spirit of the people". As a result of these designs, the parade took place on a square in the southern outskirts of Ashgabat, with a grandstand being installed on the square eleven days prior. Unlike previous years, Berdimuhamedov received a report from the Secretary of the State Security Council of Turkmenistan, Lieutenant General Çarymyrat Amanow. Turkish-made Baykar Bayraktar TB2 drones were shown off for the first time at the parade. A virtual procession of naval ships passing in the port in the Caspian Sea also took place. After the military parade, the president was presented with a horse named Garashsyz (Independent) from members of the government. The President of the Republic of Tatarstan Rustam Minnikhanov and the Director General of KAMAZ Sergey Kogogin were in attendance.
2022	31st	South Ashgabat	Serdar Berdimuhamedow	The 31st anniversary parade was the first under the newly elected President of Turkmenistan Serdar Berdimuhamedow.
2026	35th	South Ashgabat	Serdar Berdimuhamedow	

== Gallery ==
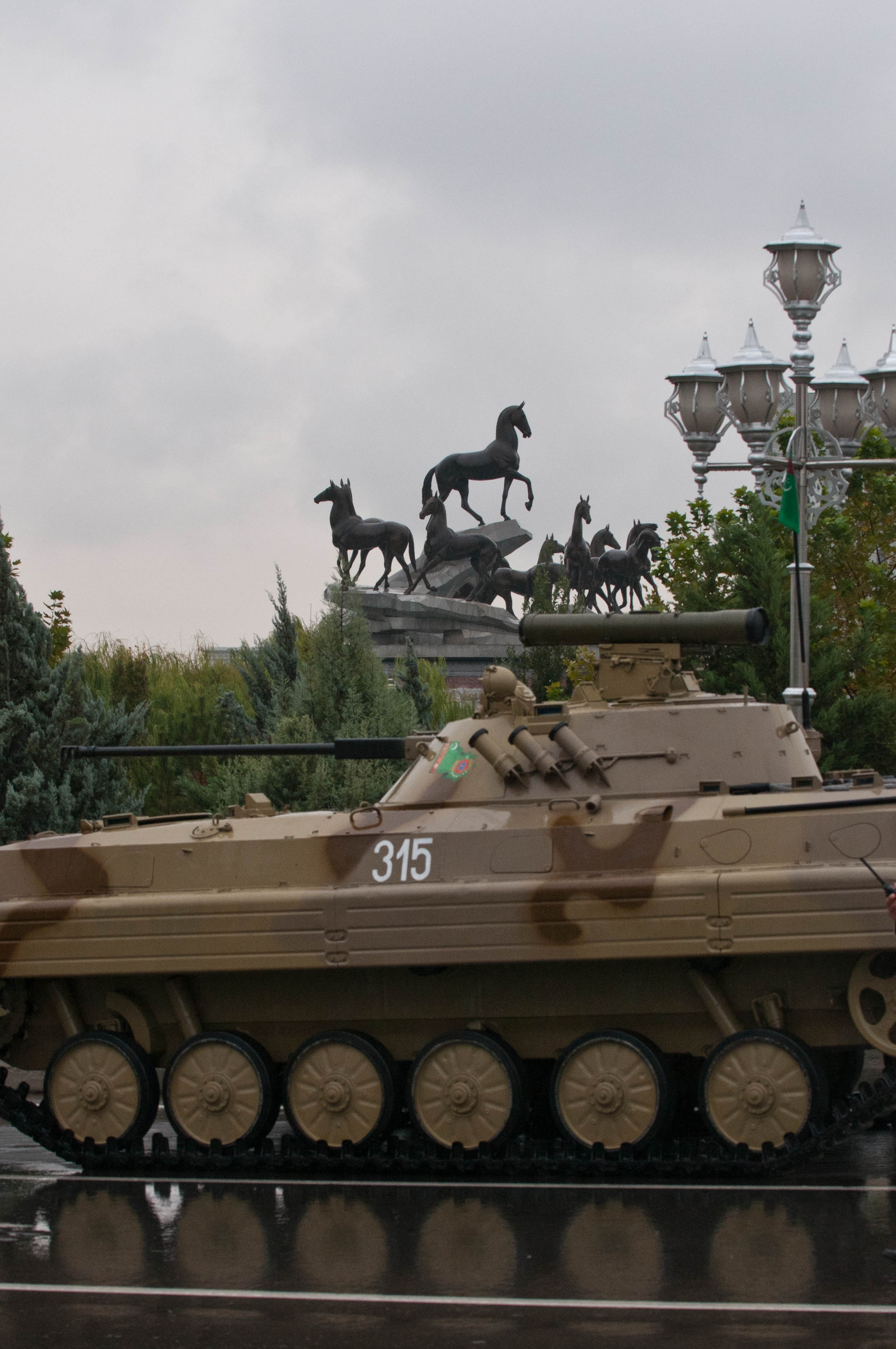
BMP-2 Infantry Fighting Vehicle

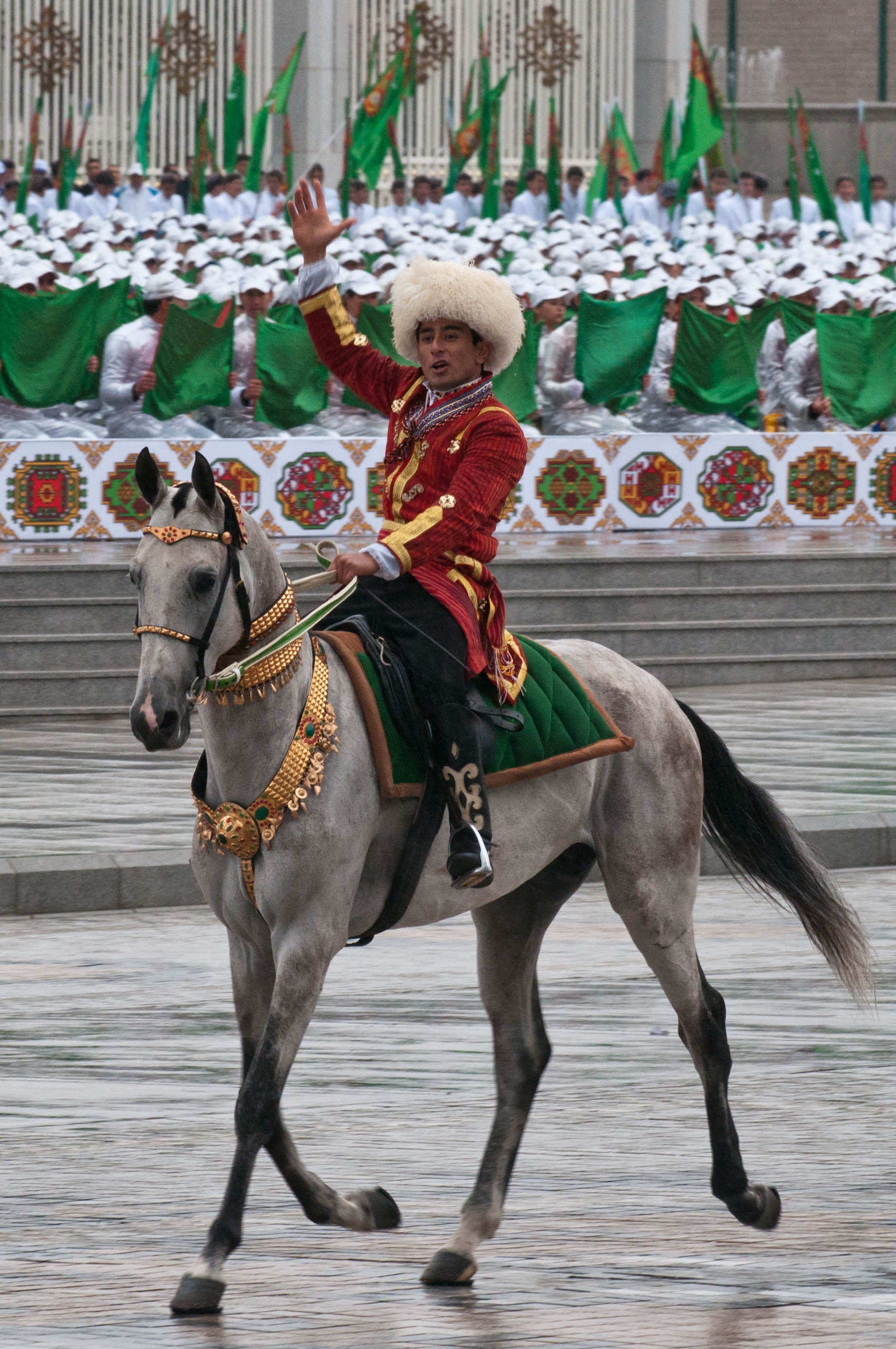
Mounted Army Cavalary

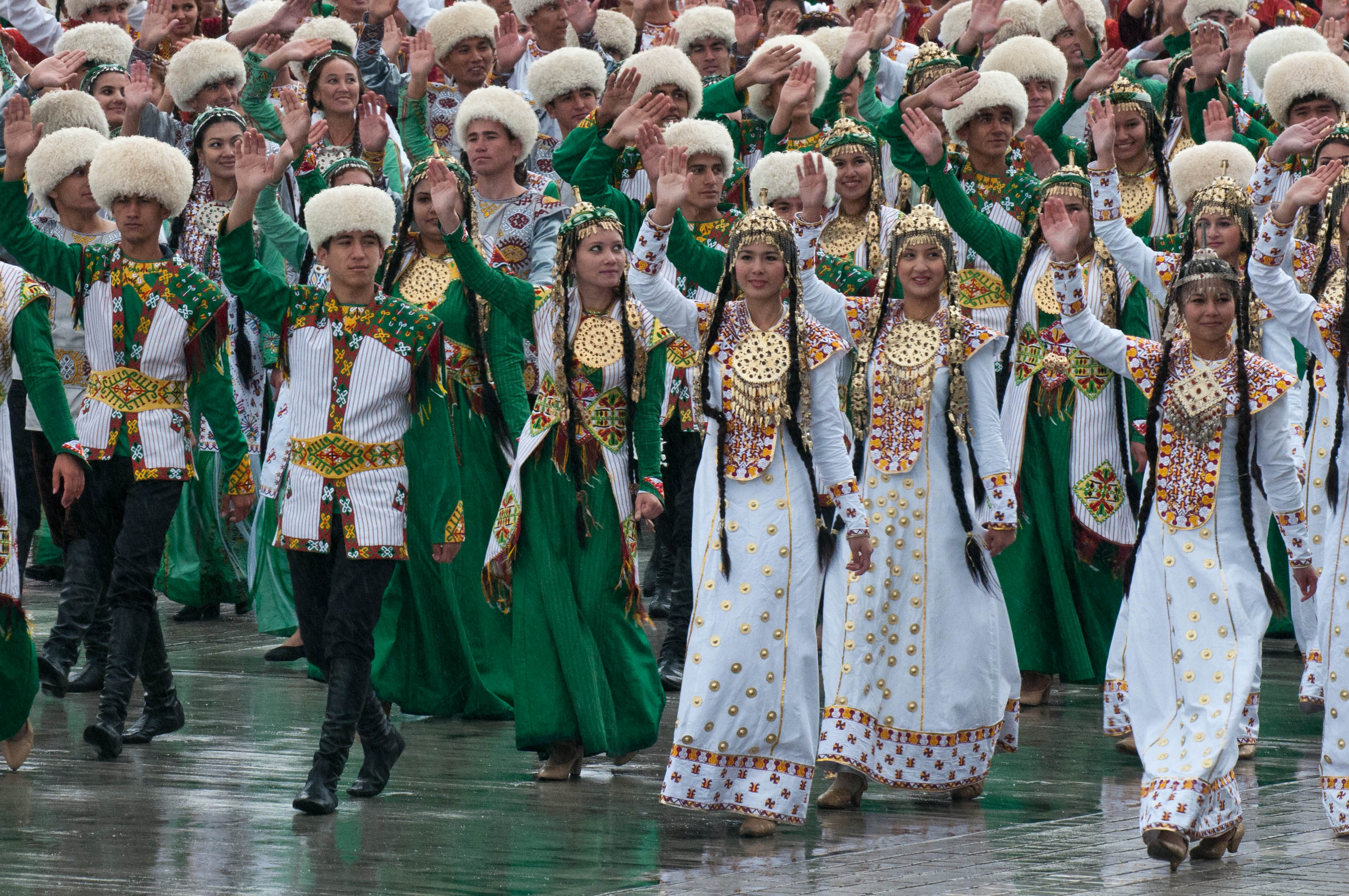
Mass demonstrations

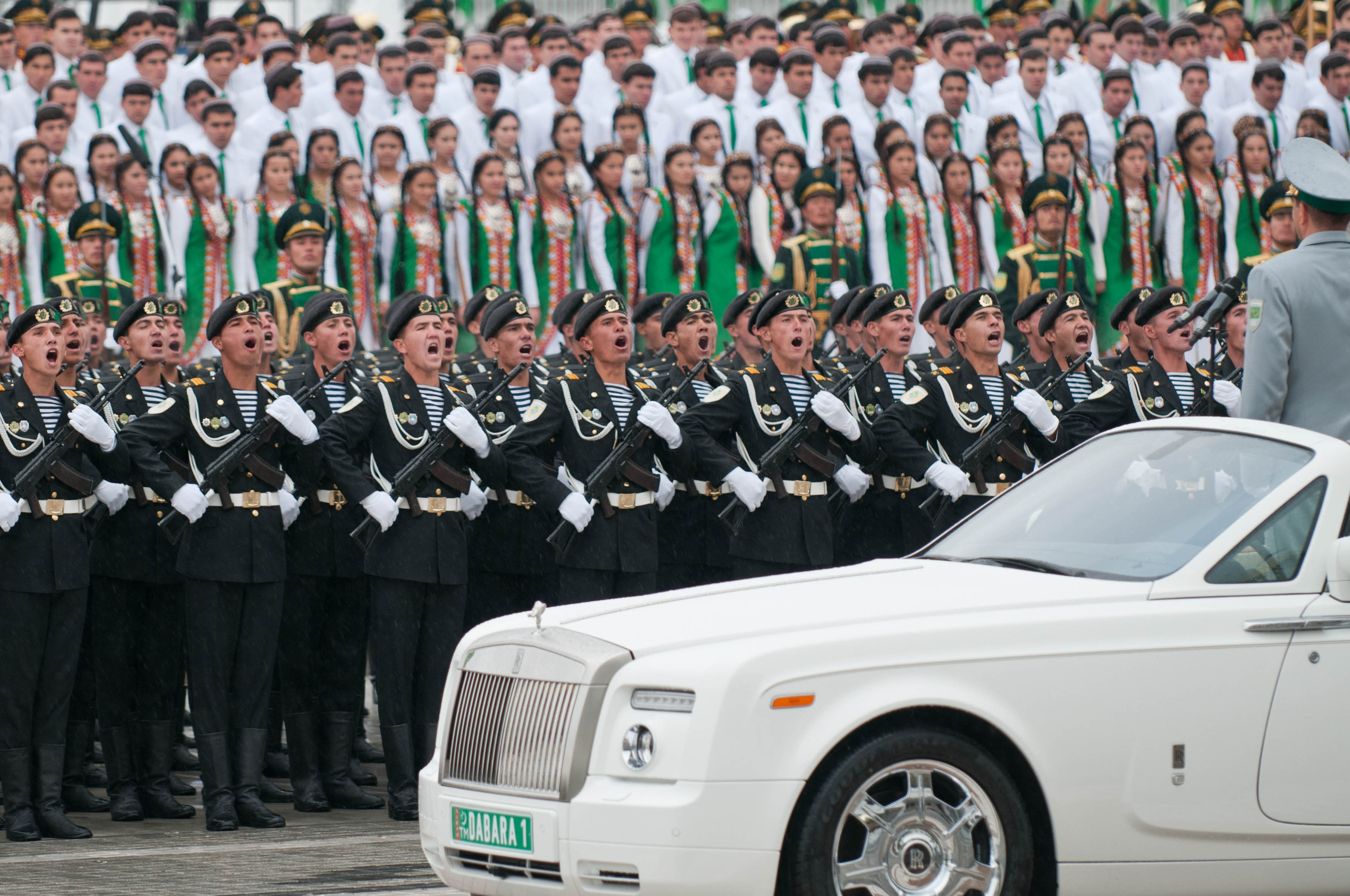
An inspection of troops

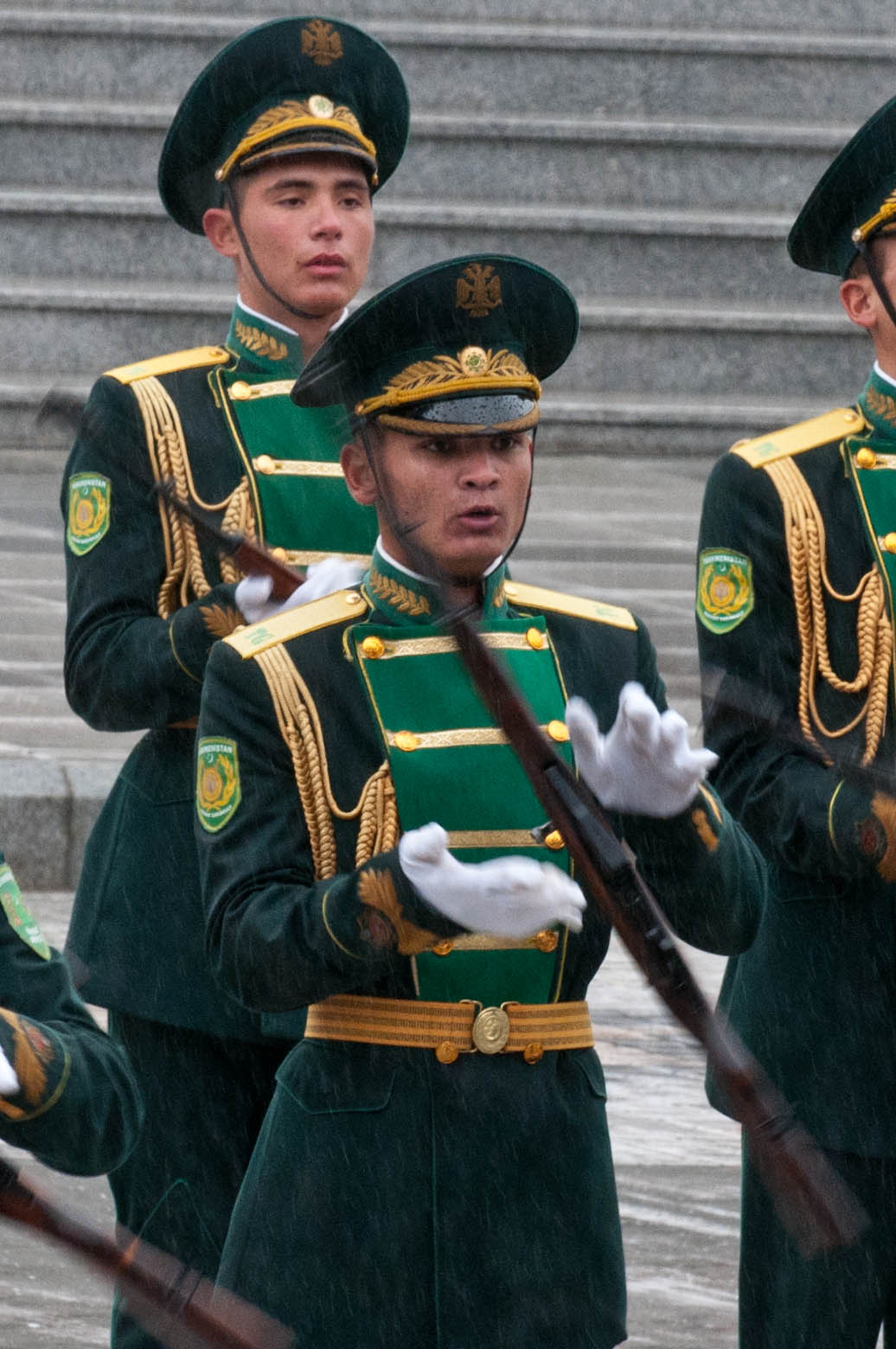
A soldier during the exhibition drill

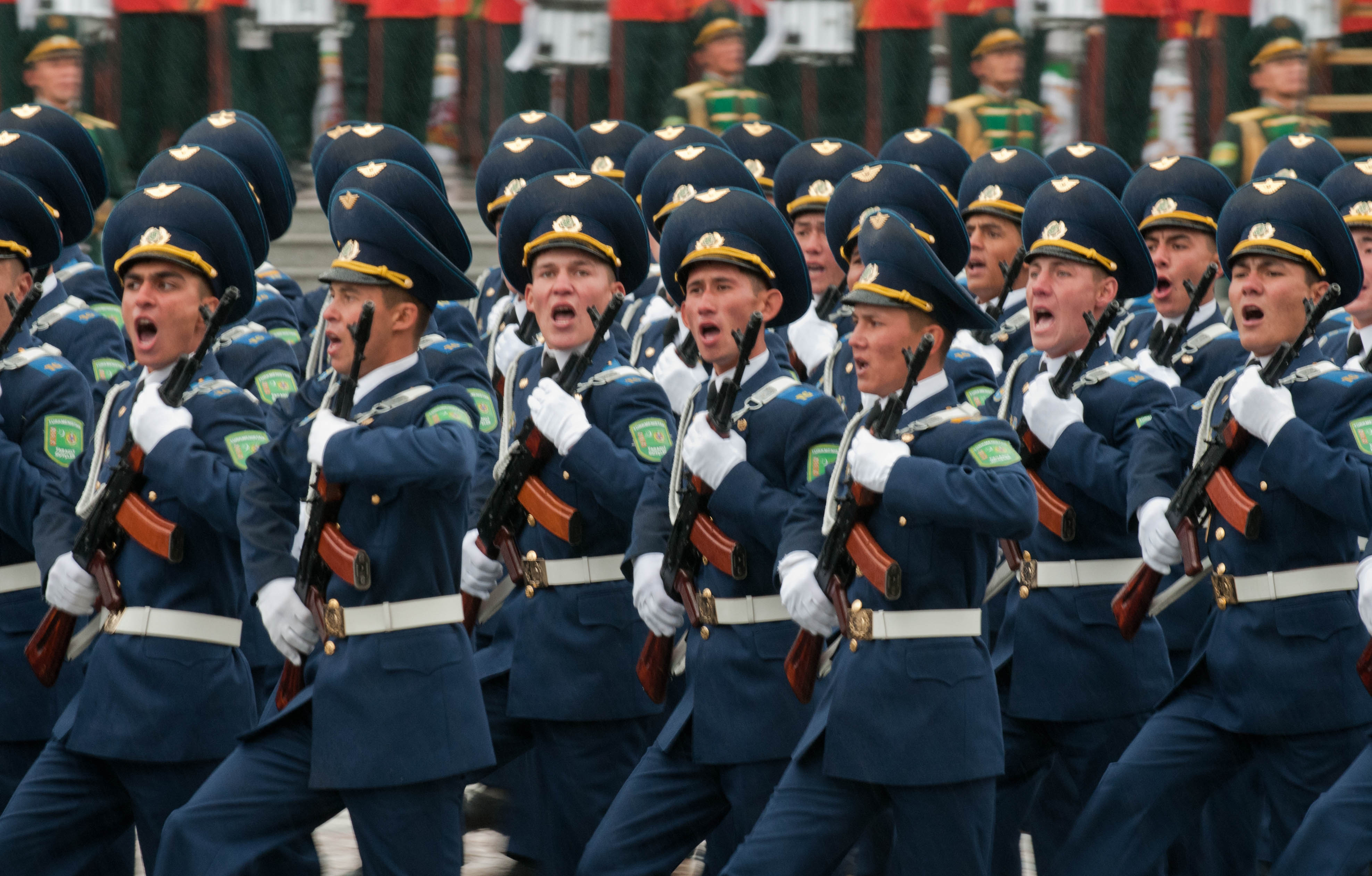
Air force soldiers

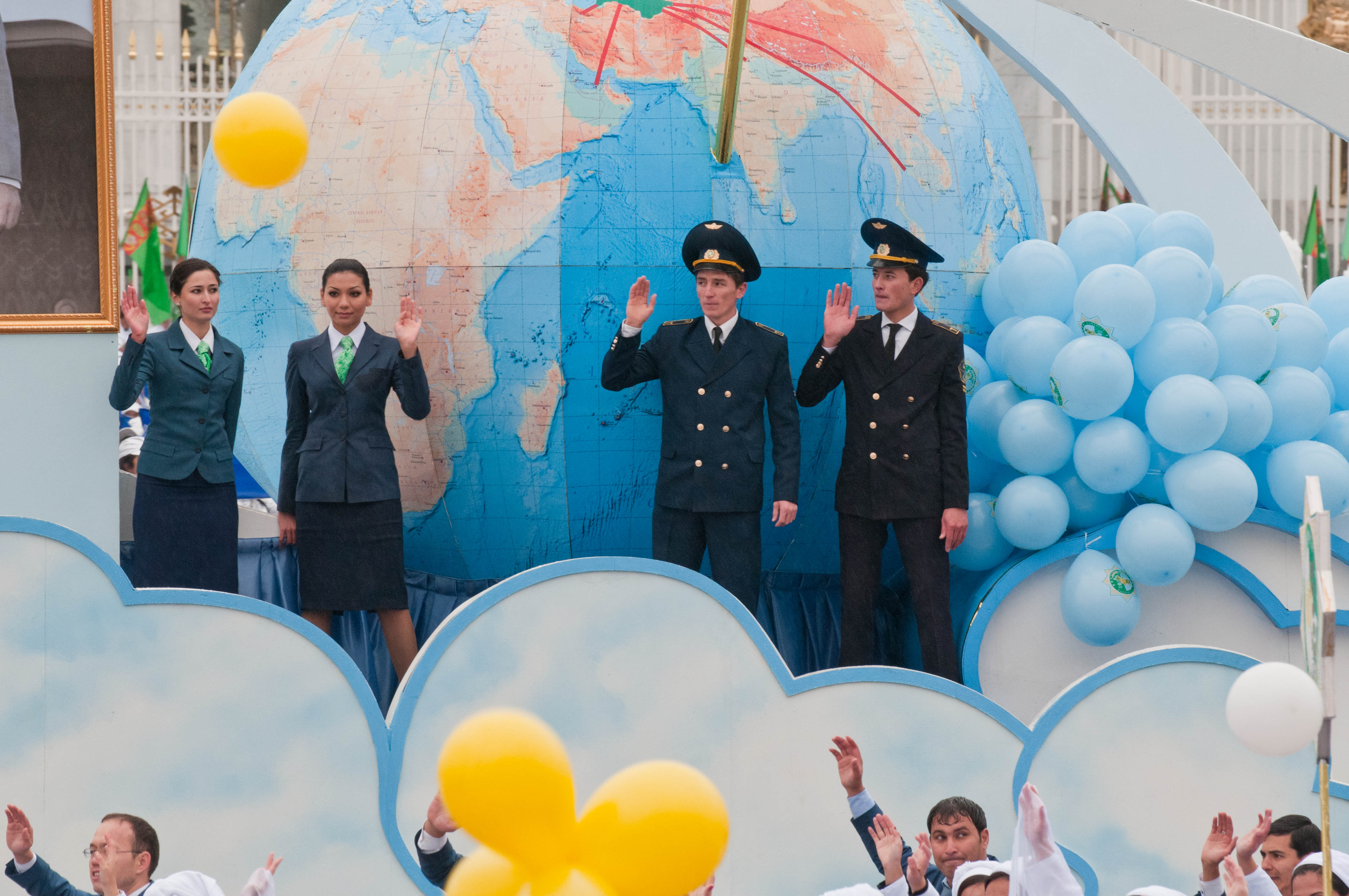
An aviation float

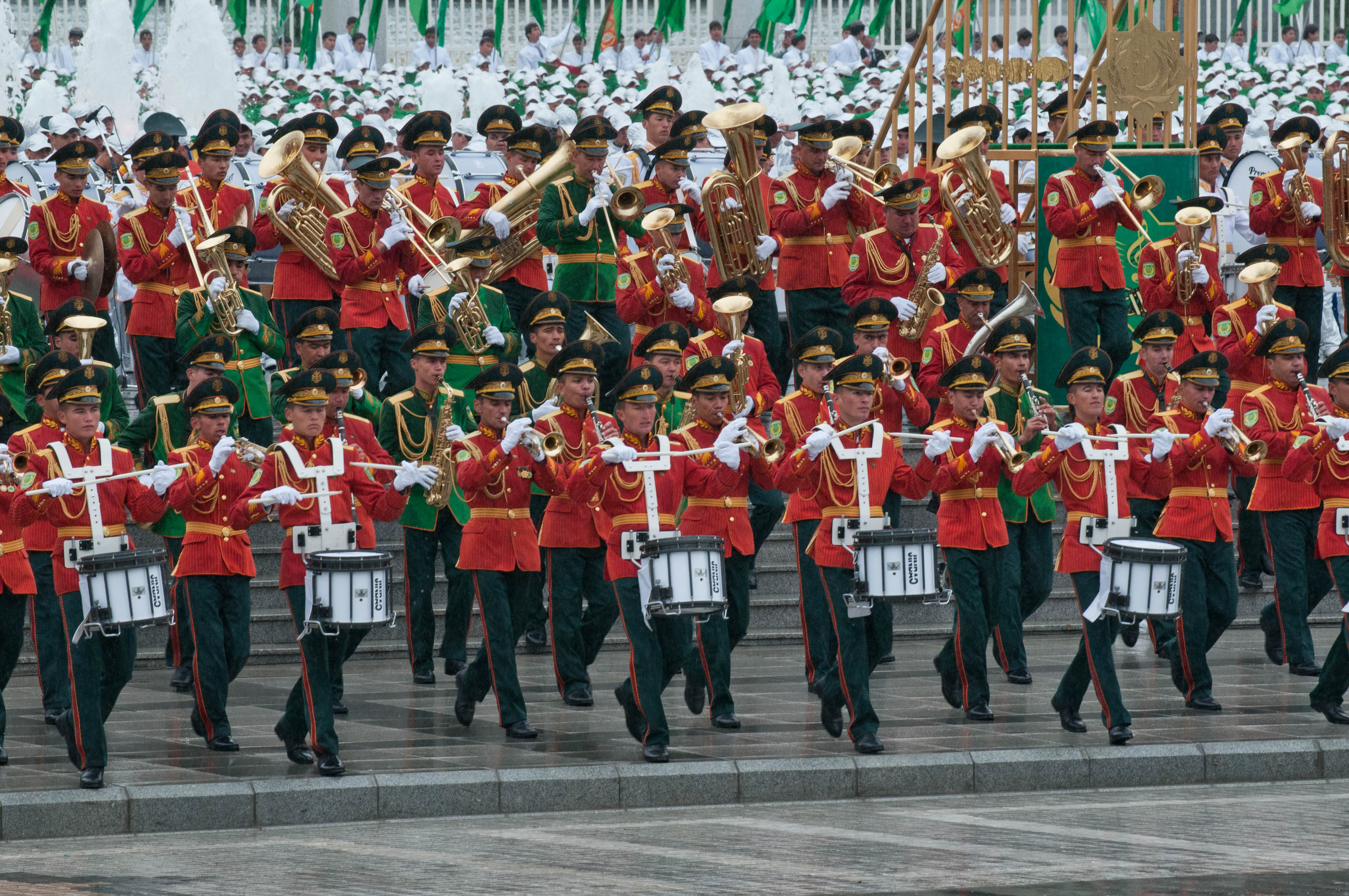
Massed bands

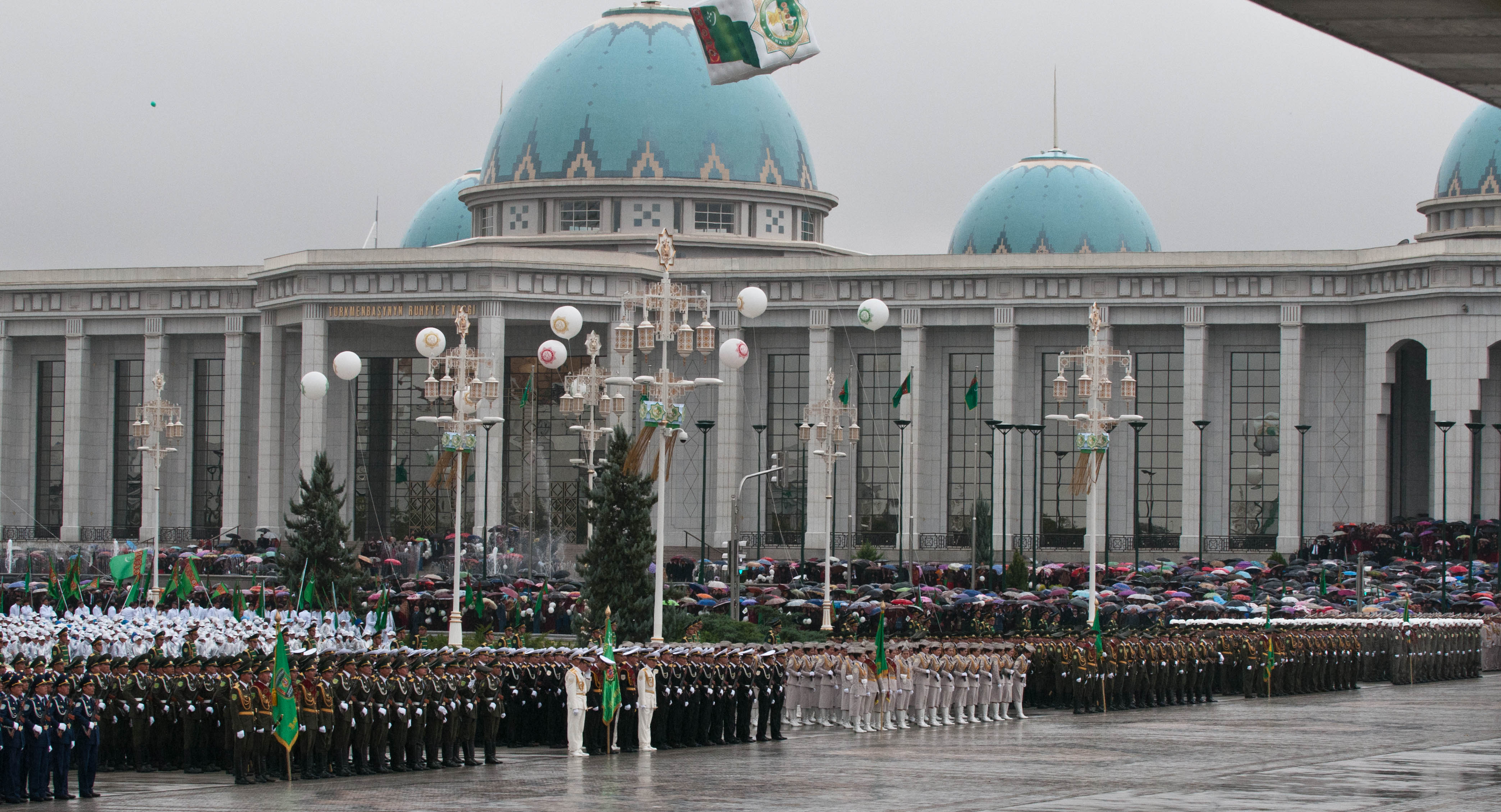
The entire parade with the Ruhyýet Palace in the background

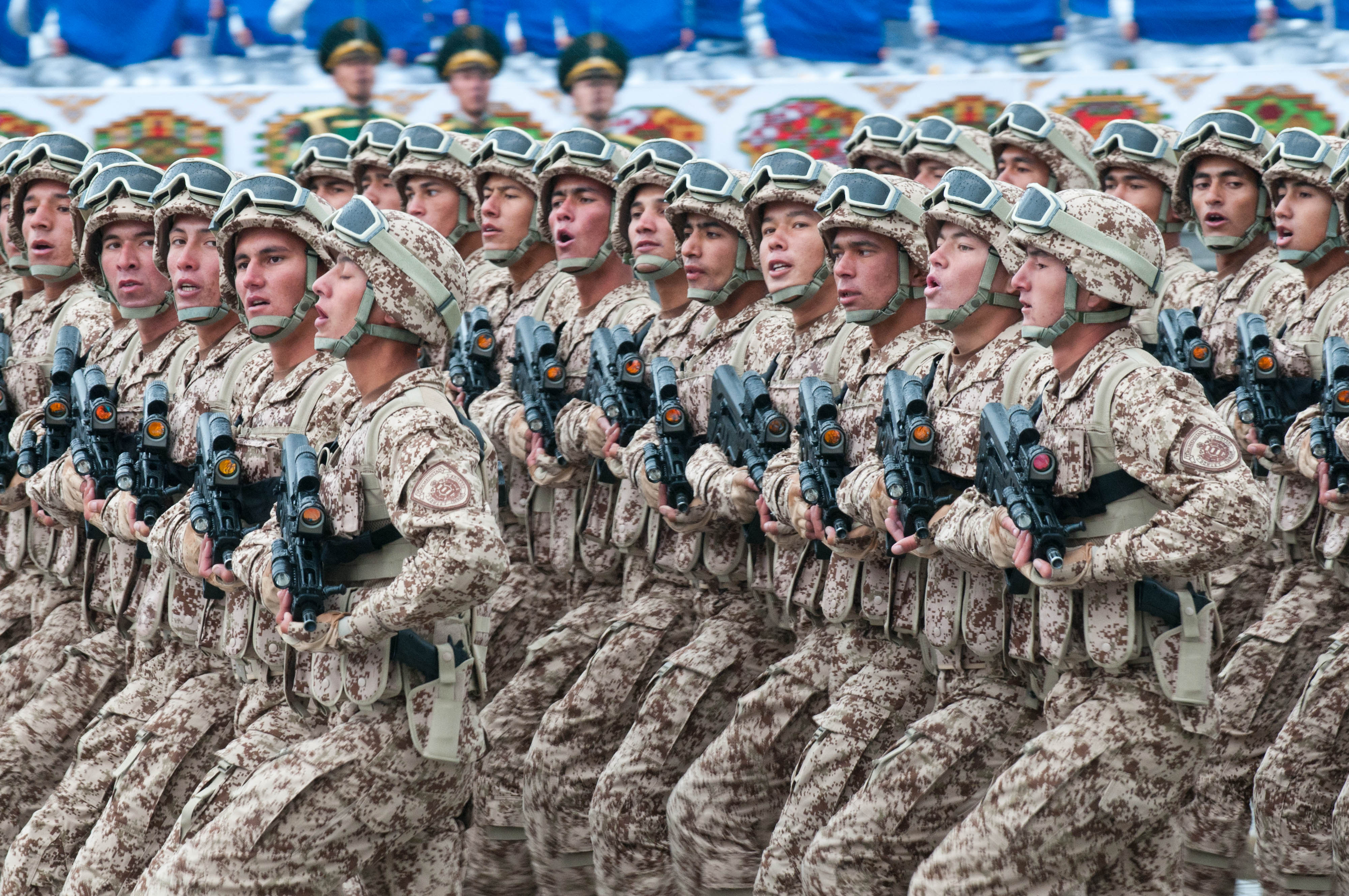
Ground Forces

== See also ==
- Independence Day (Turkmenistan)
- Armed Forces of Turkmenistan
