= Berdimuhamed Annayev 1st Specialized Military School =

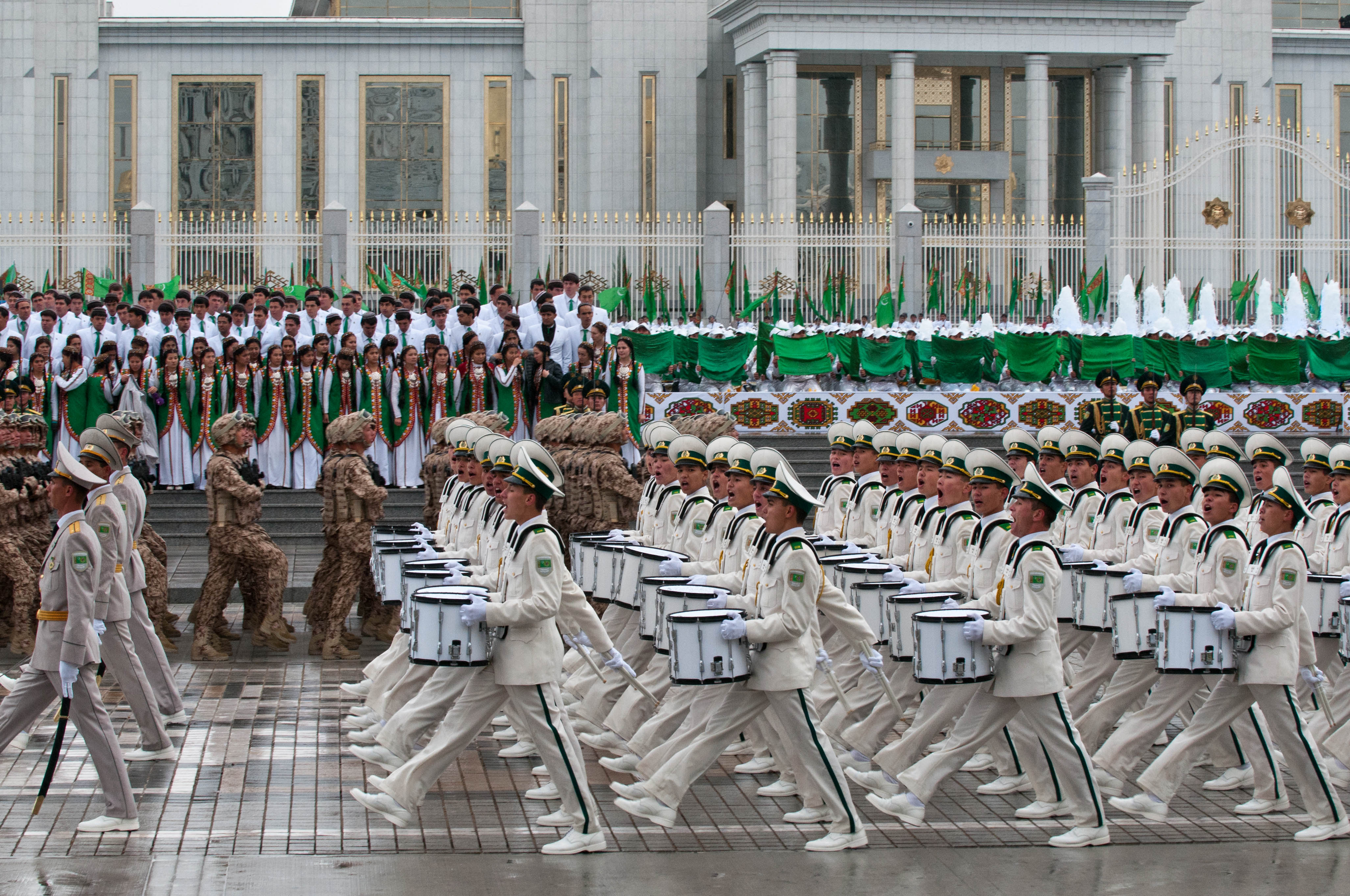
The corps of drums of the school during an annual parade in Ashgabat in 2011.

The Berdimuhamed Annayev 1st Specialized Military School (Turkmen: Berdimuhamed Annaýewiň adyndaky harby mekdep) is a boarding school of the Armed Forces of Turkmenistan. It is part of the Ministry of Defence and is located at the Military Institute, next to the university buildings. It is one of three specialized schools, two of which are located in the administrative centers of the Dashoguz and Mary regions, where almost 900 children study combined.

== Overview ==
Since January 2012, the study of cadets of the higher military school began in the updated ultra-modern university campus, equipped with the most advanced educational systems and specialized military training. In 2014, it was named after Berdimuhamed Annaev, the grandfather of President Gurbanguly Berdimuhamedow and veteran of the Red Army during the Second World War. Students are admitted with full consent of parents, with young men who choose the profession of a military entering after the 7th grade as they continue to receive secondary education along with drill, military and humanitarian training. 200 future soldiers begin studying the basics of military affairs at the school. In addition, during the training, young officers master civil professions, which can be useful in civilian careers.

In 2018, the school took part in the posthumous awarding of Annayev with the Russian Order of Honour. The school's corps of drums are the first unit to march on the central square during the annual Turkmen Independence Day Parade. In 2020, during the first Turkmen Victory Parade at the Halk Hakydasy Memorial Complex, the students of the school wore the traditional uniforms of the Suvorov Military Schools, which were the first military boarding schools to be founded in the Soviet Union. A couple days after the parade, Berdimuhamedow personally went to the school to express his appreciation to the cadets as well as hand over documents about his father to the school staff for educational purposes. In August 2021, a flight uniform worn by Berdimuhamedow in Balkan was transferred to the museum of the school.

== Center for Innovative Technologies and Education ==
The Center for Innovative Technologies and Education was established at the school in late February 2020. It acts within the Council of Young Scientists of the Military Institute. In addition to extracurricular activities, military students at the center work on projects, study areas of interest, and prepare for exhibitions and class competitions. Currently, the center is equipped with state-of-the-art computers to work on software development such as 3D printers. It is planned to acquire a new batch of scientific equipment, such as robotics equipment.

== See also ==
- Mastibek Tashmukhamedov Military Lyceum of the Ministry of Defense of Tajikistan
- Temurbek Military Schools
