= Ismail Ismailov =

Turkmenistani general

Ismail Ismailov was a Turkmen general who served as the first chief of the general staff of the Armed Forces of Turkmenistan. From 30 August 2009 to February 2010, he was Deputy Commander and Chief of Staff of the Turkmen Air Force. From February 2010 to March 2011, he was Deputy Minister of Defense and Chief of the Main Directorate of Supply and Logistics of the Ministry of Defense. From 29 March 2011, he was First Deputy Minister of Defense of Turkmenistan and Chief of the General Staff of the Armed Forces of Turkmenistan. Following his dismissal, he became Director of the Military Academy of Turkmenistan and was promoted to Lieutenant General. In December 2020, he was awarded the Jubilee Medal "25 Years of Neutrality of Turkmenistan".

== See also ==
- Government of Turkmenistan
- Ministry of Defense of Turkmenistan
- Armed Forces of Turkmenistan
