= Chief of the General Staff (Turkmenistan) =

Highest-ranking military officer in the Armed Forces of Turkmenistan

- Türkmenistanyň Ýaragly Güýçleriniň Baş ştabynyň başlygy
- Roundel of the Armed Forces

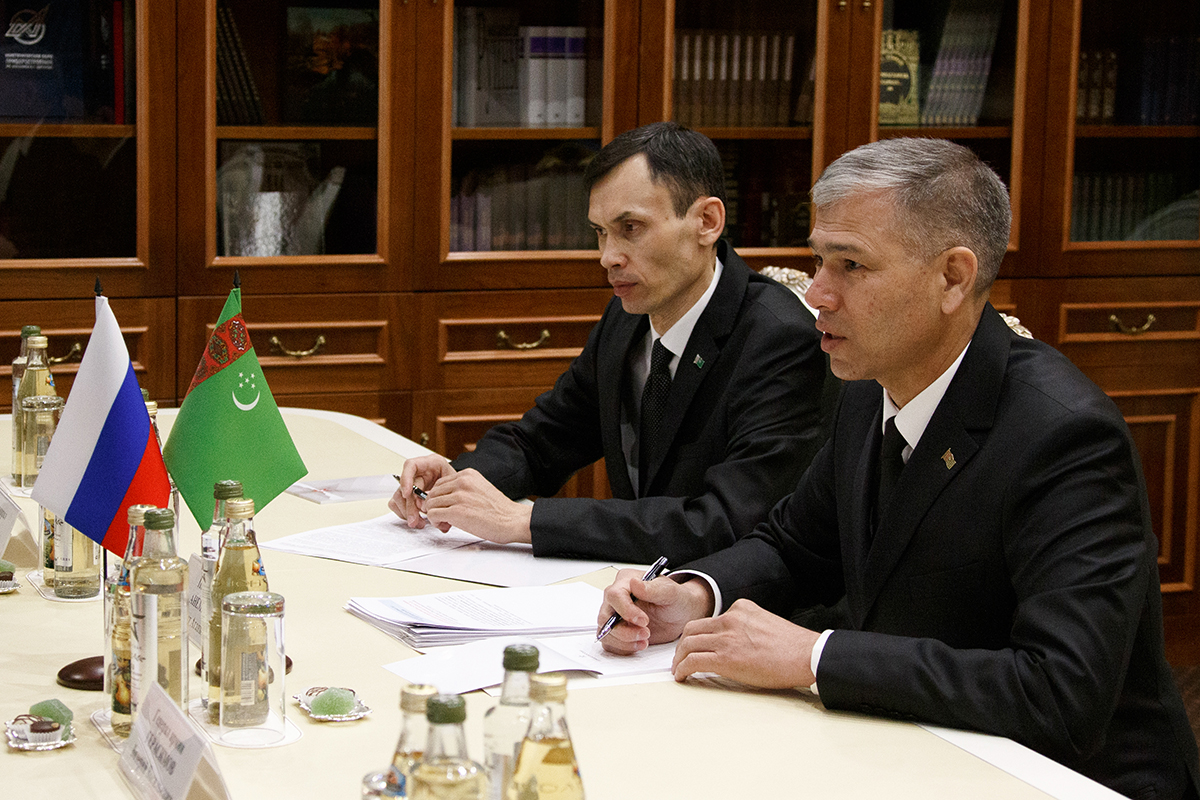
- Incumbent; Akmurad Anamedov since 2019
- Ministry of Defence
- Member of: General Staff of Turkmen Armed Forces
- Reports to: Major General Begench Gundogdyev, Minister of Defense
- Residence: Ashgabat
- Appointer: President of Turkmenistan
- Constituting instrument: Constitution of Turkmenistan
- Formation: 1994
- First holder: Major General Annamurat Soltanov
- Deputy: Colonel N. X. Gochiyev, Deputy Chief of the General Staff

The Chief of the General Staff of Turkmen Armed Forces (Turkmen: Türkmenistanyň Ýaragly Güýçleriniň Baş ştabynyň başlygy) is the highest-ranking military officer in the Armed Forces of Turkmenistan, who is responsible for maintaining the operational command of the military and its three major branches. The Chief of the General Staff represents the entire Turkmen military and is in command of the leaders of the Turkmen National Guard, Turkmen Ground Forces, Turkmen Air Force, Turkmen Air Defense Forces, Turkmen Navy and the Turkmen Border Troops.

== List of Chiefs ==
No.	Portrait	Name	Took office	Left office	Time in office	Ref.
1	Annamurat Soltanov	Major General; Annamurat Soltanov (born 1943)	1994	11 February 1997	2–3 years	.
2	Akmurad Mulkamanov	Major General; Akmurad Mulkamanov	11 February 1997	17 September 1998	1 year, 218 days	.
3	Serdar Charyyarov	Lieutenant General; Serdar Charyyarov	17 September 1998	26 May 2003	4 years, 251 days	
4	Rejepgeldy Nursakhatov	Major General; Rejepgeldy Nursakhatov	26 May 2003	23 February 2004	273 days	
5	Mohammedkuli Atabaev	Lieutenant General; Mohammedkuli Atabaev	23 February 2004	5 November 2009	5 years, 255 days	.
6	Begench Gundogdyev	Major General; Begench Gundogdyev (born 1976)	5 November 2009	29 March 2011	1 year, 144 days	
7	Ismail Ismailov	Major General; Ismail Ismailov	29 March 2011	c. 2018	6–7 years	
8	Akmurad Anamedov	Colonel; Akmurad Anamedov	c. 2019	Incumbent	7–8 years	.

== See also ==
- Armed Forces of Turkmenistan
- Ministry of Defense (Turkmenistan)
