= Independence Day (Turkmenistan) =

Annual holiday in Turkmenistan

Independence Day Turkmen: Garaşsyzlyk baýramy Turkmen Cyrillic: Гарашсызлык бaйрaмы
- Independence Monument, Ashgabat
- Observed by: Turkmenistan
- Type: State
- Significance: The day the Declaration of Independence was adopted by the Turkmen SSR Supreme Soviet in 1991
- Celebrations: Fireworks, Concerts
- Date: September 27
- Next time: 27 September 2027
- Duration: 1 days
- Frequency: annual

Independence Day of Turkmenistan (Turkmen: Garaşsyzlyk baýramy, Гарашсызлык бaйрaмы) is the main state holiday in Turkmenistan. This date is celebrated in Turkmenistan annually on September 27.

== History ==
The Turkmen Soviet Socialist Republic participated in the referendum held in March 1991 in an attempt to preserve the Soviet Union as a renewed federation called the Union of Sovereign States, a referendum in which 98.26% of voters approved.

Following the events of the failed coup that took place in August, the Supreme Soviet of the Turkmenistan decided to adopt the law "About Independence and Bases of a State System of Turkmenistan", effectively declaring its independence on 27 October 1991. After disintegration of the USSR, the Turkmen SSR became one of the last republics in the former Soviet Union to proclaim state sovereignty. In 2018, the government of Turkmenistan voted to move the date exactly a month back to September 27.

== Celebrations ==
When it comes to formal protocol, there is a ceremony of laying flowers at the Independence Monument, followed by a massive military parade on the central square of Ashgabat. The military parade is followed by the mass procession of representatives of the five provinces, capital of Ashgabat, as well as workers in various branches of Turkmenistan's economy. On Independence Day, a tradition of awarding outstanding citizens and cultural figures state awards is common practice. World leaders such as the President of Russia and the President of the United States typically deliver congratulations to the Turkmen nation. In many cities of the country, festive events and concerts are held. Salutes and fireworks in honor of independence are also traditional events. The holiday is celebrated with festivities on September 27.

== Notable individual commemorations ==
- On the occasion of the 2nd anniversary of independence, a military parade was held for the first time since the fall of the USSR. The parade took place on Makhtumkuli Avenue in Ashgabat and was commanded by Minister of Defence, Colonel General Dangatar Kopekov.
- In 1997, the Pakistan Army Armoured Corps Centre Band from Nowshera took part in the celebrations.
- In 2005, a Mother and Child Center, a new building of the Ministry of Healthcare and Medical Industry as well as a new apartment house was opened in southern Ashgabat.
- The International Equestrian Sports Complex was opened on the holiday in 2011.
- By the 30th anniversary in 2021, 30 million trees will have been planted in accordance with the corresponding resolution signed by the Cabinet of Ministers.

== Gallery ==
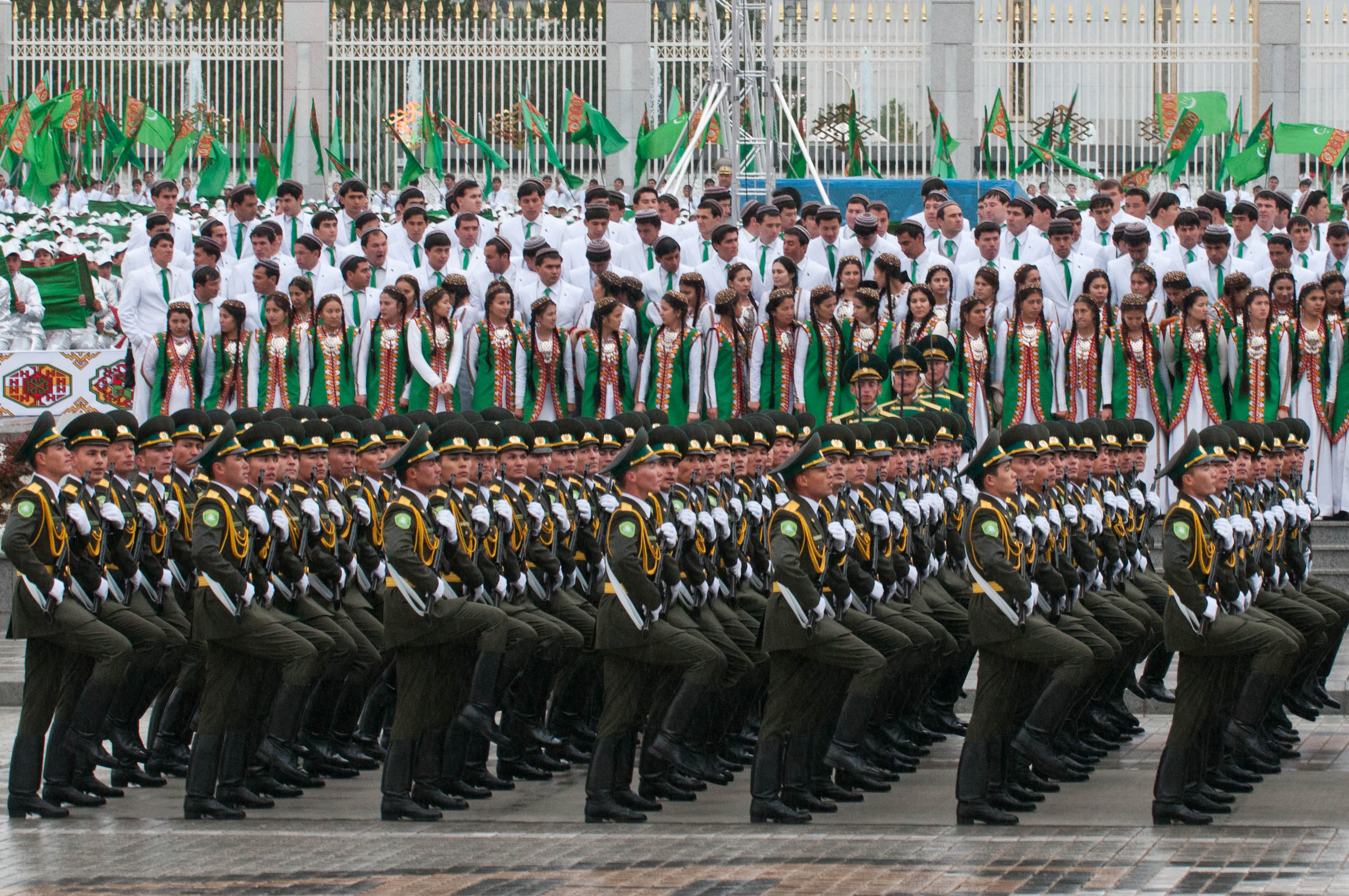
A military parade in Ashgabat.

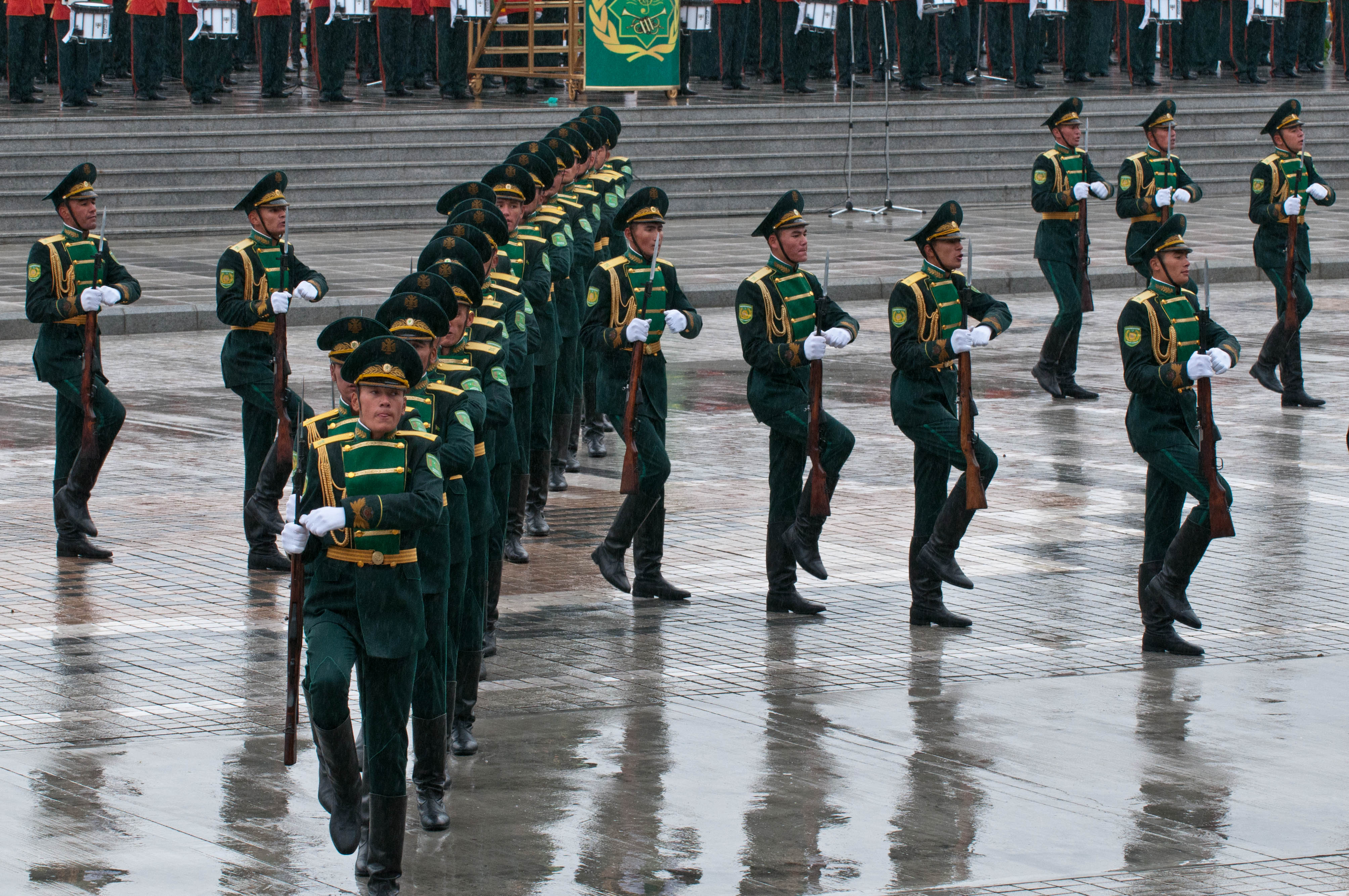
An honor guard performance in Ashgabat.

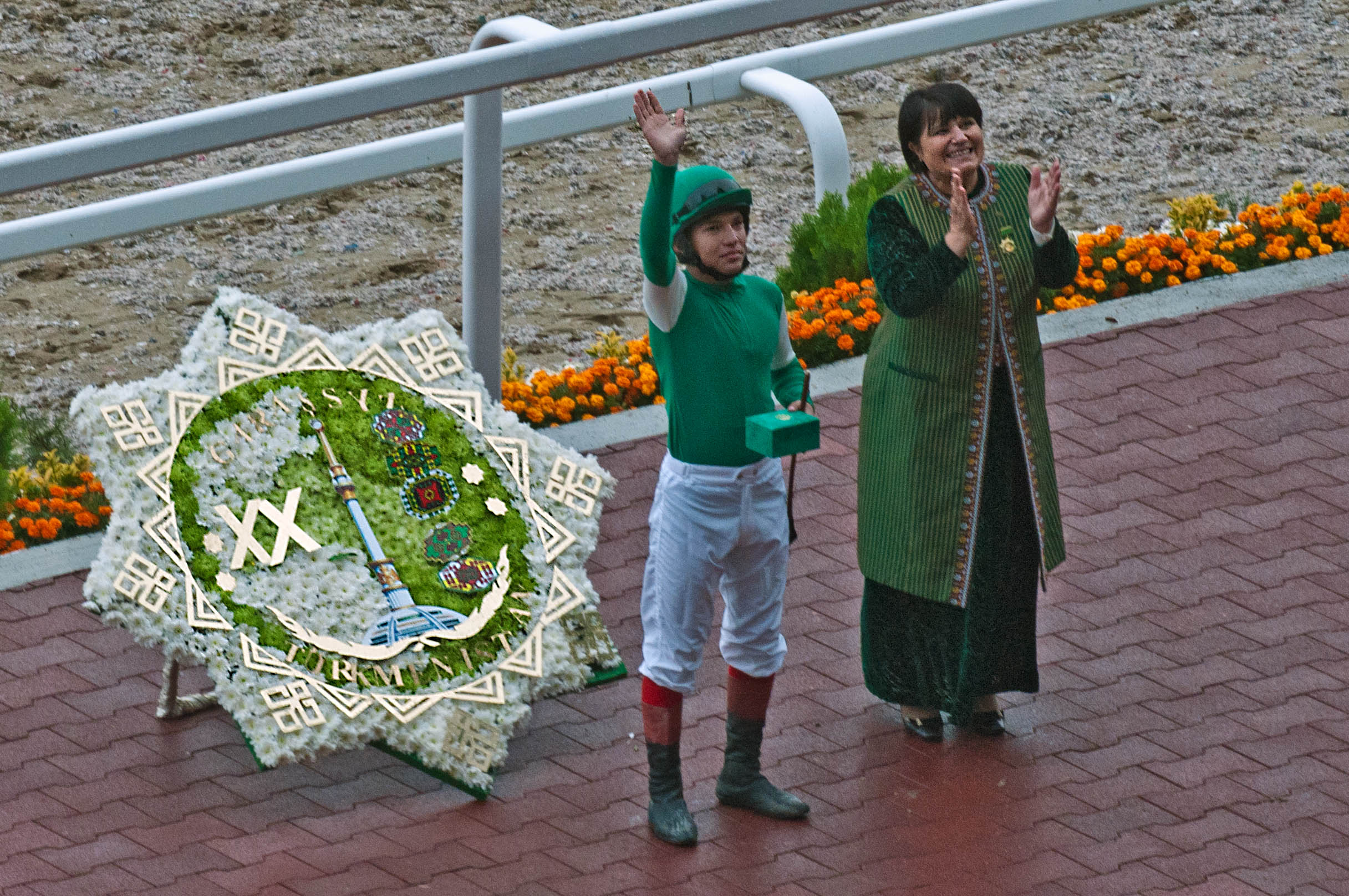
The opening of International Equestrian Sports Complex by Akja Nurberdiýewa in 2011.
