= Annamurat Soltanov =

Turkmen military officer (born 1943)

Chief of General Staff of the Armed Forces of Turkmenistan
- In office 1994 – February 12, 1997
- President: Saparmurat Niyazov
- Preceded by: Position Established
- Succeeded by: Akmurad Mulkamanov

Personal details
- Born: 1943 (age 82–83) Mary Region, Turkmen SSR, Soviet Union

Military service
- Allegiance: Soviet Union; Turkmenistan
- Branch/service: Soviet Armed Forces; Armed Forces of Turkmenistan
- Years of service: 1969–2001
- Rank: Colonel General

Annamurat Soltanovich Soltanov (Turkmen: Annamurat Soltanoviç Soltanov) was a Turkmen general who served as the first chief of the general staff of the Armed Forces of Turkmenistan.

== Early life and career ==
He was born in Mary Region in 1943. In 1961, he worked as a livestock specialist. He graduated from the Turkmen Agricultural Institute in 1969, and joined the Soviet Army that year. He was a cadet at the Tashkent Higher All-Arms Command School from 1971 to 1973, and also attended the Frunze Military Academy from 1974 to 1977. In the early 1980s, Soltanov served in the 373rd Guards Motorized Rifle Regiment of the 5th Guards Motor Rifle Division in Tahtabazar, Afghanistan, and the commander of the 70th Separate Motorized Infantry Brigade in Kandahar.

After returning to Turkmenistan, he served as the commander of training regiment in Ashgabat, an adviser to the Cuban Revolutionary Armed Forces, and a military Commissar in Dzhizak, Uzbek SSR. From October 1991, he served as the Military Commissar of Turkmenistan. On January 27, 1992, he was appointed as the Deputy Minister of Defense of Turkmenistan, and from 1994 to February 12, 1997, he served as the Chief of General Staff of the Armed Forces of Turkmenistan.

Until June 2001, he served as the Military Commissar of Balkan province. He was relieved of his duties on June 17 of that year in connection with illegal arms sales back in 1993 and 1994.

== See also ==
- Government of Turkmenistan
- Ministry of Defense of Turkmenistan
- Armed Forces of Turkmenistan
