= Independent Honor Guard Battalion (Turkmenistan) =

Independent Honor Guard Battalion (Military Unit 20016)
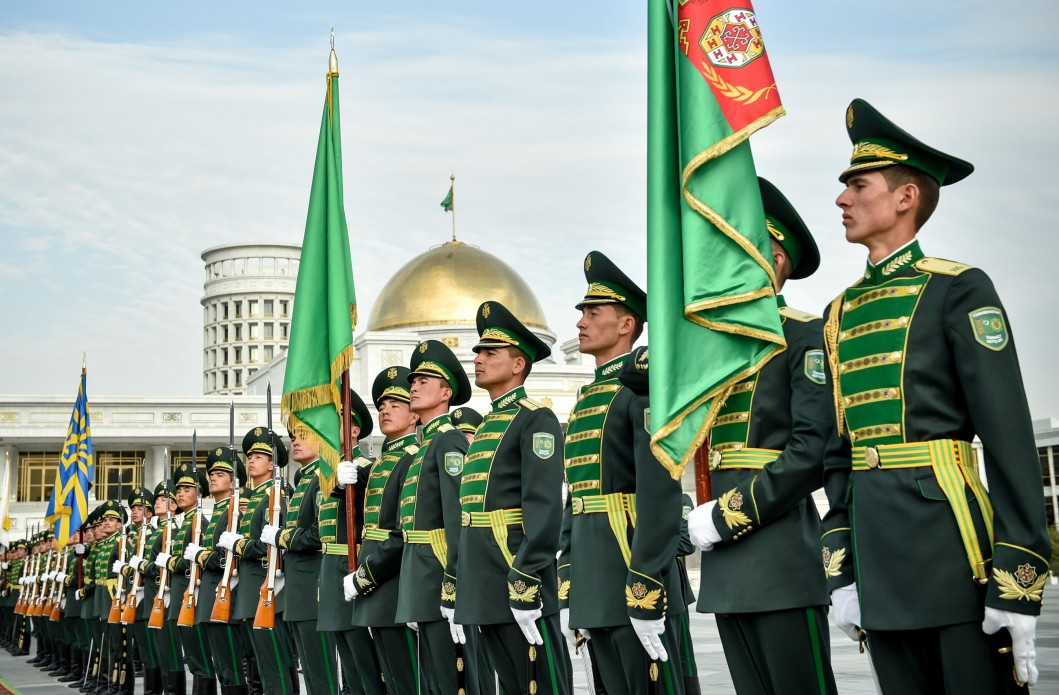
- Active: 1992; 33 years ago
- Country: Turkmenistan
- Allegiance: President of Turkmenistan
- Branch: Armed Forces of Turkmenistan
- Type: Honor Guard
- Role: public duties
- Size: 100+
- Part of: (Turkmenistan) Ministry of Defense; Turkmen Ground Forces
- Garrison/HQ: Ashgabat
- March: Niyazov's Honour March
- Rifle: SKS

Commanders
- Commander: Major General Bashmurat Berdinazarov
- Notable commanders: Pygy Baýramdurdyýew

The Independent Honor Guard Battalion of the Ministry of Defence of Turkmenistan (Turkmen: Türkmenistanyň Goranmak Ministrligi Hormat Garawuly Batalyony; Russian: Отдельный батальон Почетного караула Министерства обороны Туркменистан) is the official ceremonial unit of the Armed Forces of Turkmenistan that serves as a guard of honour unit. The battalion guards the Independence Monument, the National Museum of Turkmenistan and the Presidential Palace in Ashgabat. The battalion was formed in 1992 as one of the first purely ceremonial units of the Turkmen Armed Forces. The battalion is composed of two infantry companies and also maintains a cavalry company. The Turkmen Internal Troops, Turkmen Border Troops, and Turkmen National Guard are separate from the battalion.

== Role and history of activities ==
Ceremonial duties are usually served by the battalion:

- State visits of foreign leaders visiting Turkmenistan (e.g. Presidents Hassan Rouhani and Ilham Aliyev)
- Guarding the National Museum of Turkmenistan and the Independence Monument in Ashgabat.
- Raise the national flag on special ceremonies
- Receiving the new armed forces unit colors
- Unveiling of monuments

A military band was created within the unit in 1992.

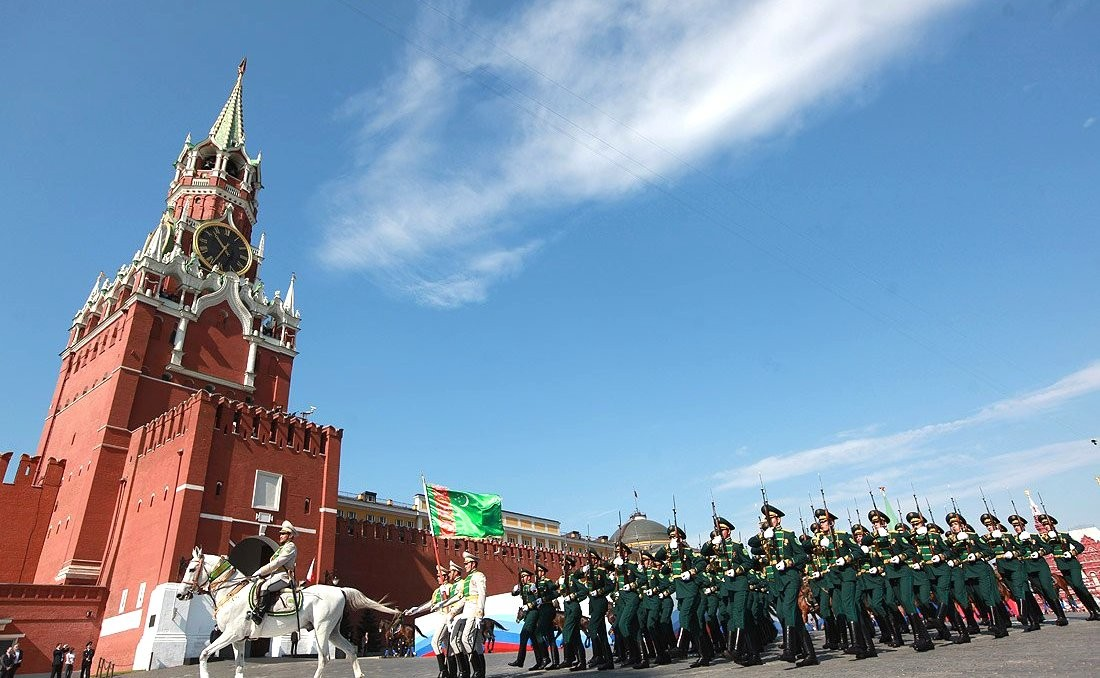
The battalion in the 2010 Moscow Victory Day Parade.

=== Independence Day ===
One of the first events the battalion took part in was the independence day military parade on Makhtumkuli Avenue in October 1992, serving as linemen for the parading troops. The battalion is the first contingent on Independence Square during the annual Independence Day Parade, during which it also performs a unique drill routine that sees it create shapes and figures such as a Map of Turkmenistan, the Akhal-Teke, and a figure of the number "27".

=== Victory Day 2010 ===
The battalion took part in the annual Victory Day Parade in Moscow in May 2010, and with the Russian Government's permission, the commander of the battalion, Major Pygy Baýramdurdyýew, led the contingent on horseback, with the white Akhal-Teke horse being a descendant of the horse Marshal Georgy Zhukov rode on during the Moscow Victory Parade of 1945. President Gurbanguly Berdimuhamedov praised the level of training of the unit put in while in Moscow, saying that it will be "immortalized in modern history of Turkmenistan".

=== Victory Day Parade in Ashgabat ===
In 2020, the battalion took part in the first Victory Parade in Ashgabat, held at Halk Hakydasy Memorial Complex on the occasion of the 75th anniversary of the war victory. One of the color guards in the parade held the combat flag of the 748th Infantry Regiment, which was the unit Berdymuhammed Annayev (President Berdimuhamedov's grandfather) served in during the Great Patriotic War. The battalion received the flag at Ashgabat International Airport from a color guard from the Russian Armed Forces that was on a special Moscow-Ashgabat flight. They were transported by a special car to the site of the parade. The Victory Banner was also brought from Russia to be trooped on the square.

=== Victory Day 2020 ===
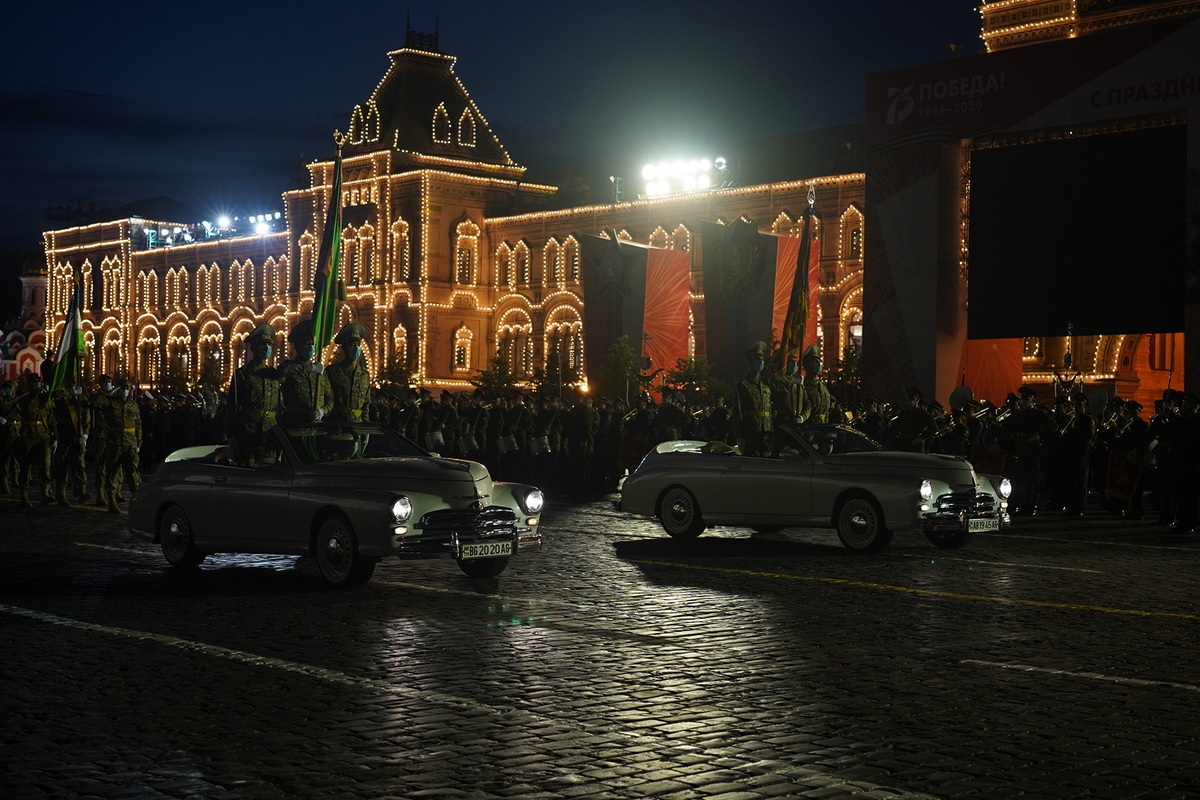
The two Turkmen Pobeda cars during the nighttime rehearsal on Red Square.

During the 2020 Moscow Victory Day Parade, the Turkmen contingent from the battalion consisted of two color guards riding in two GAZ-M20 Pobeda cars brought in from the Turkmen capital. One guards carried the Flag of Turkmenistan and the other carried the combat flag of the 748th Infantry Regiment. After their appearance, the contingent were quarantined at a hospital in Turkmenabad due to COVID-19 restrictions.

== Training ==
The honor guard trains by tightening a 500-grit sack of sand at the end of a 4 kg carbine during an arms exercise, increasing the strength of the hands of the servicemen which allows them to easily control the carbines. Concrete products with the shape of a jar (500 gr) are used to instill handshakes that conform to the guard of honor. In addition, they are trained with a coarse-grained sandstone (700–750 gr) that is specially tied to their feet so that their marches are harmonious.

== Uniform ==
The full dress uniform of the infantry unit is based on that of Russian honor guards and has a range of shades of green, the national color. The cavalry squadron wears more traditional clothing. Their uniform consists of fur hats and long quilted robes, as well harem pants that resemble loose trousers. In March 2015, Berdimuhamedov personally sampled the new dress uniform of the guard of honor and the equestrian escort after a meeting of the State Security Council of Turkmenistan.

== Unit photos ==
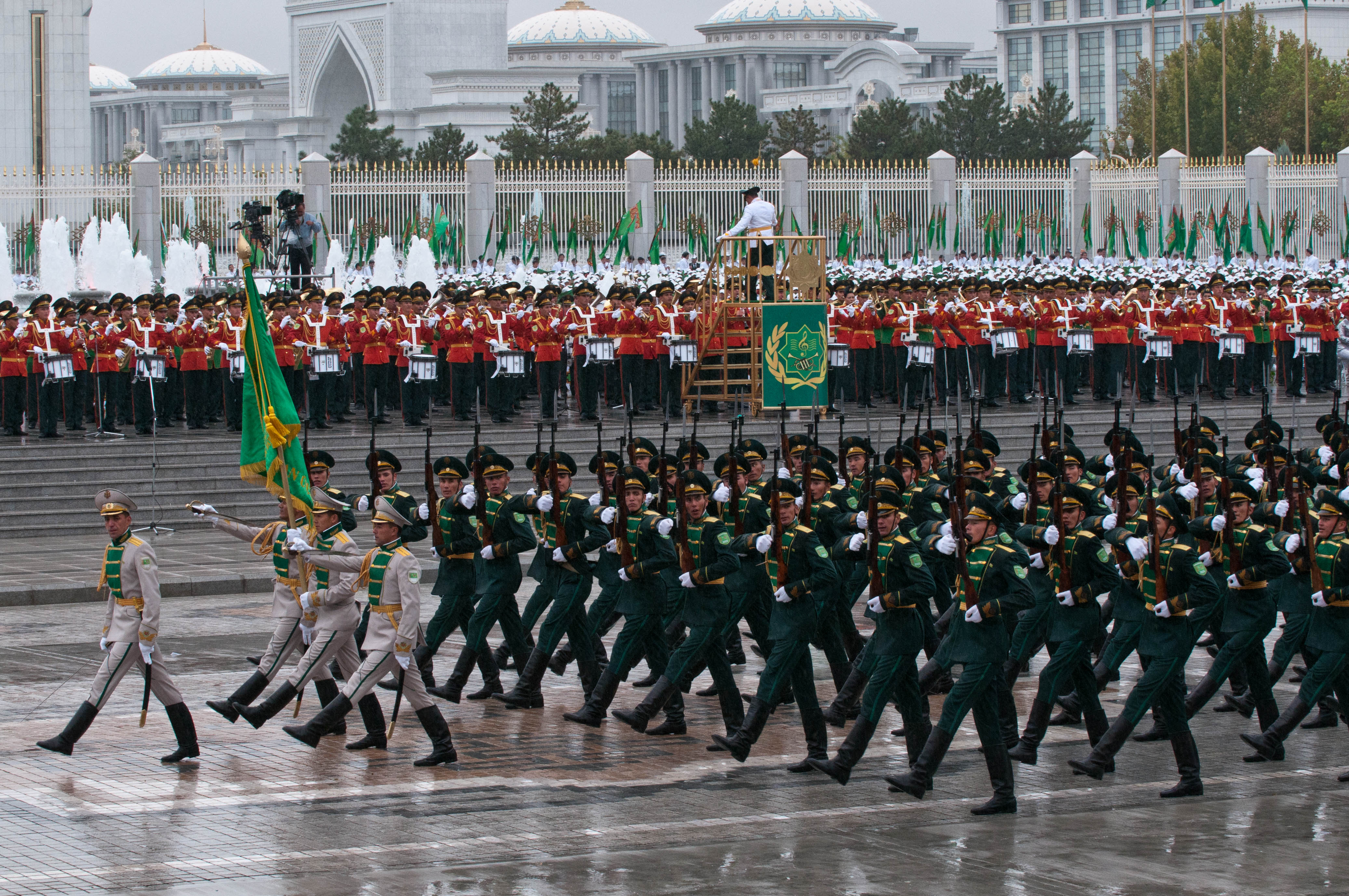
The battalion drill team

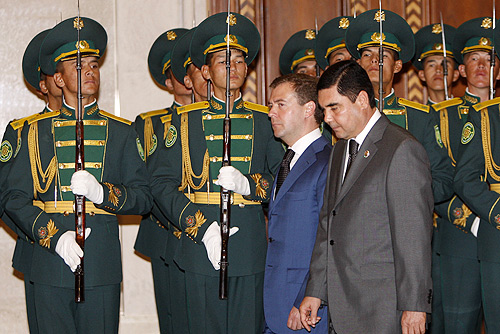
Dmitry Medvedev inspecting the battalion with his Turkmen counterpart in Ashgabat in 2008.

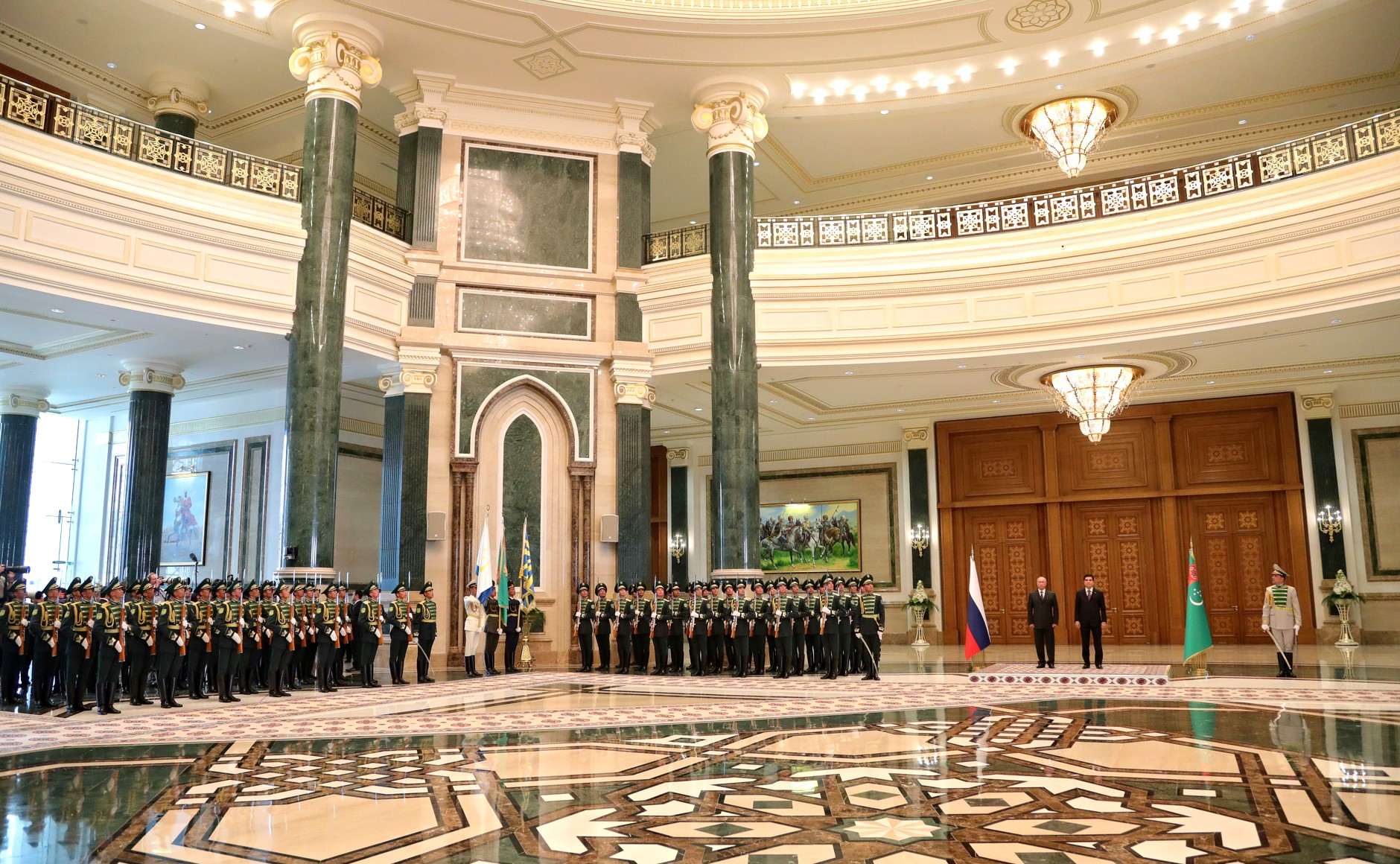
The battalion inside the Oguzkhan Presidential Palace.

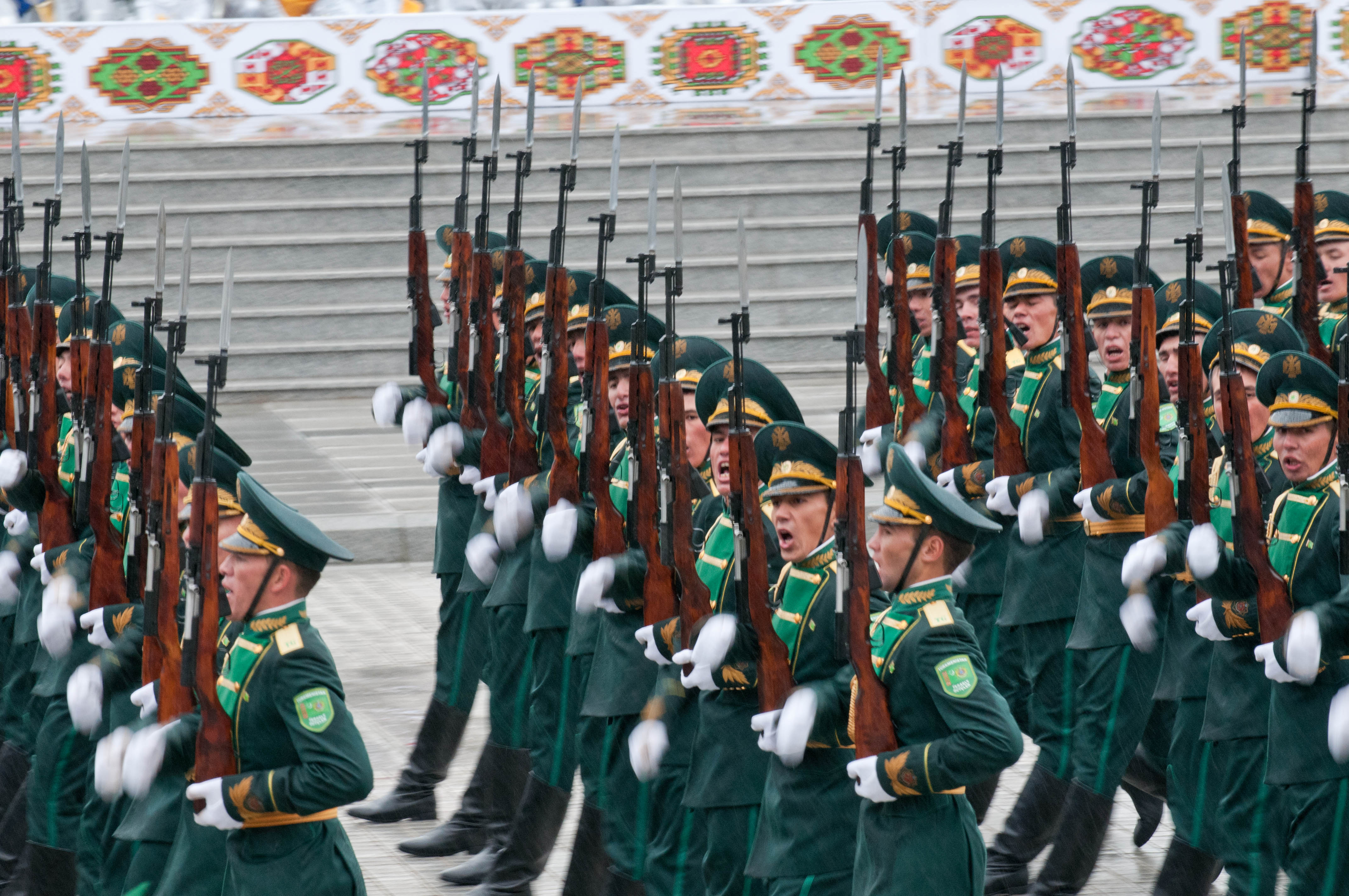
The battalion on parade.

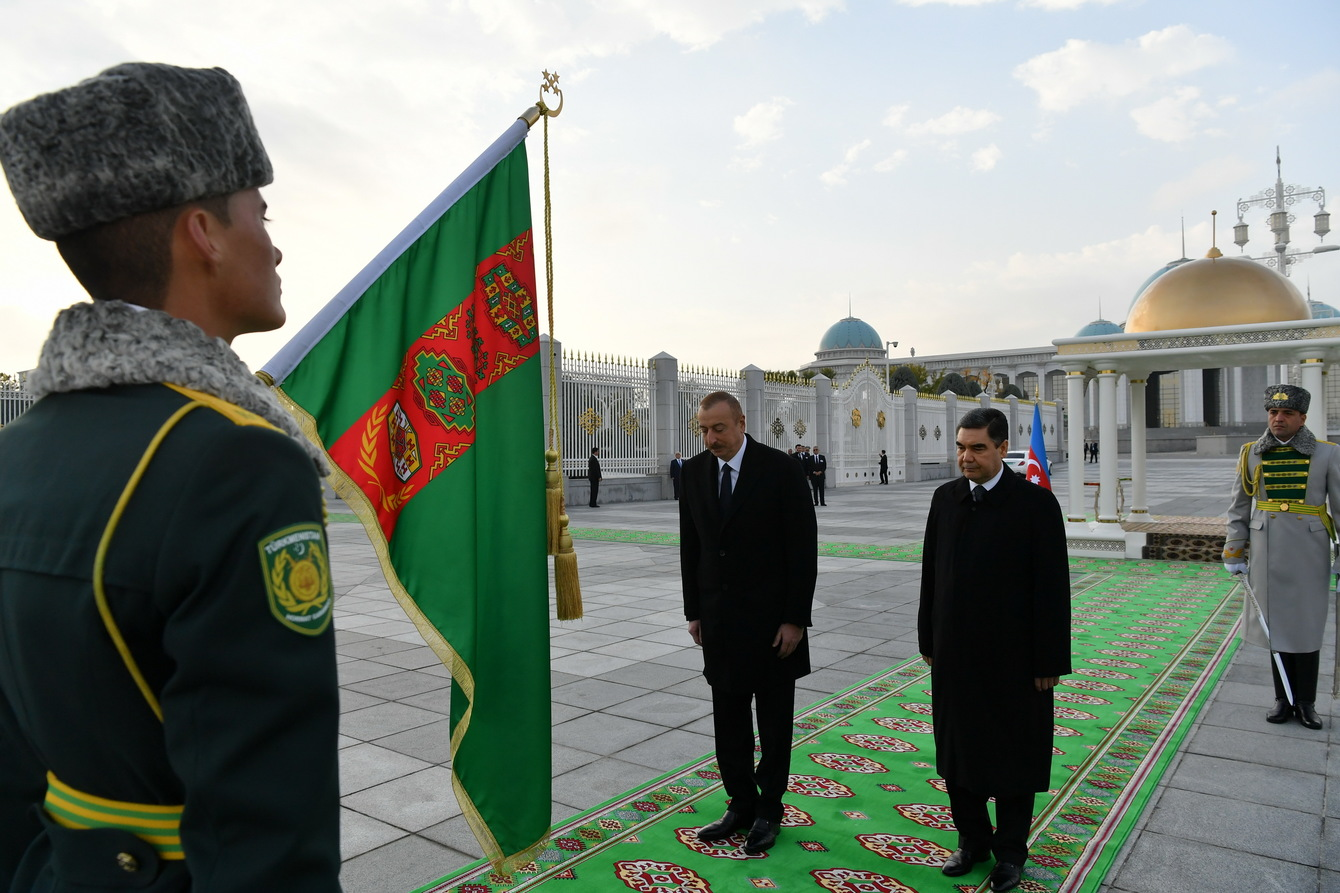
A color guard lowering the national flag in the present arms position.

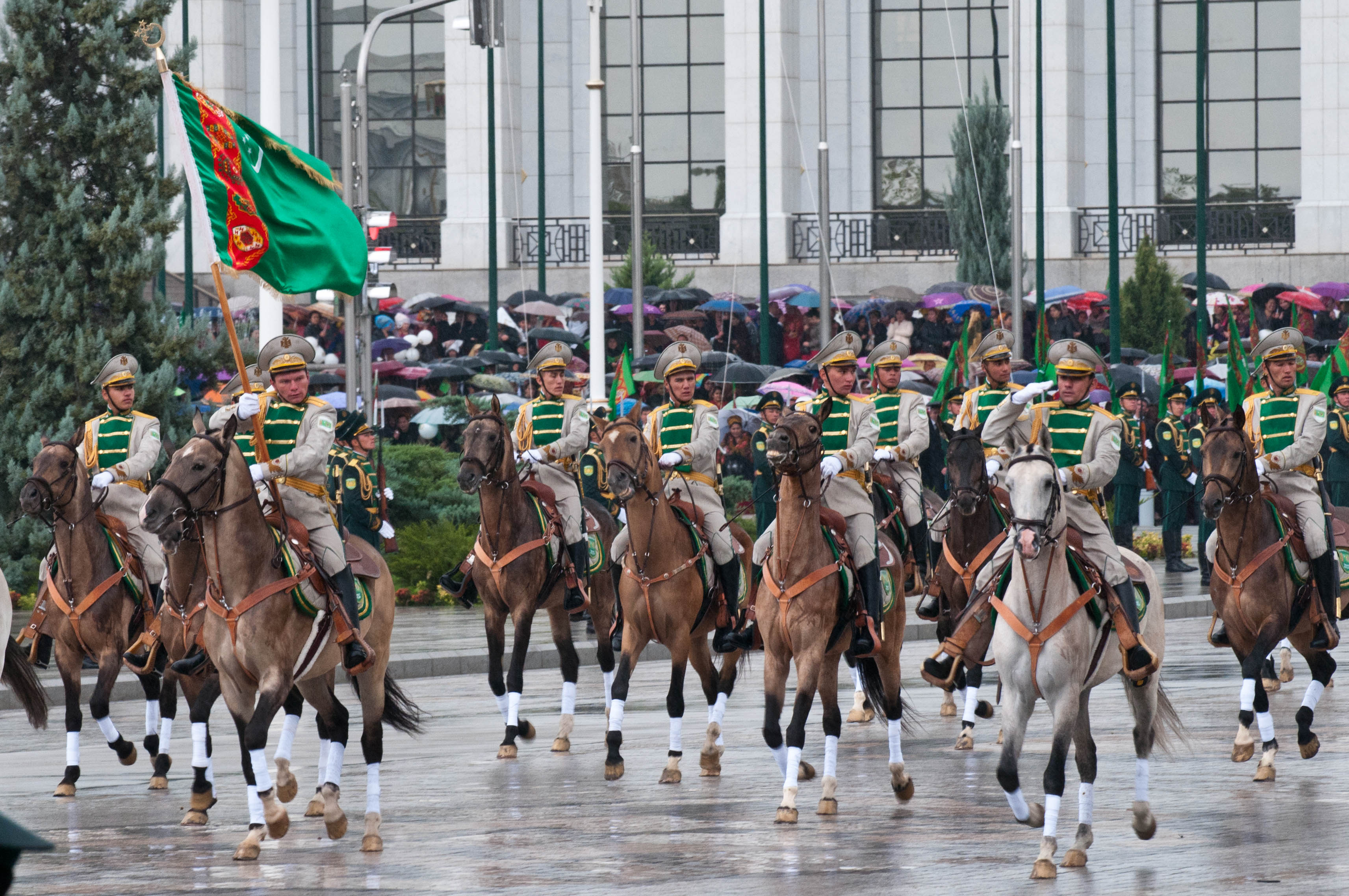
The ceremonial cavalry in during the Independence Day parade in Ashgabat in 2011.

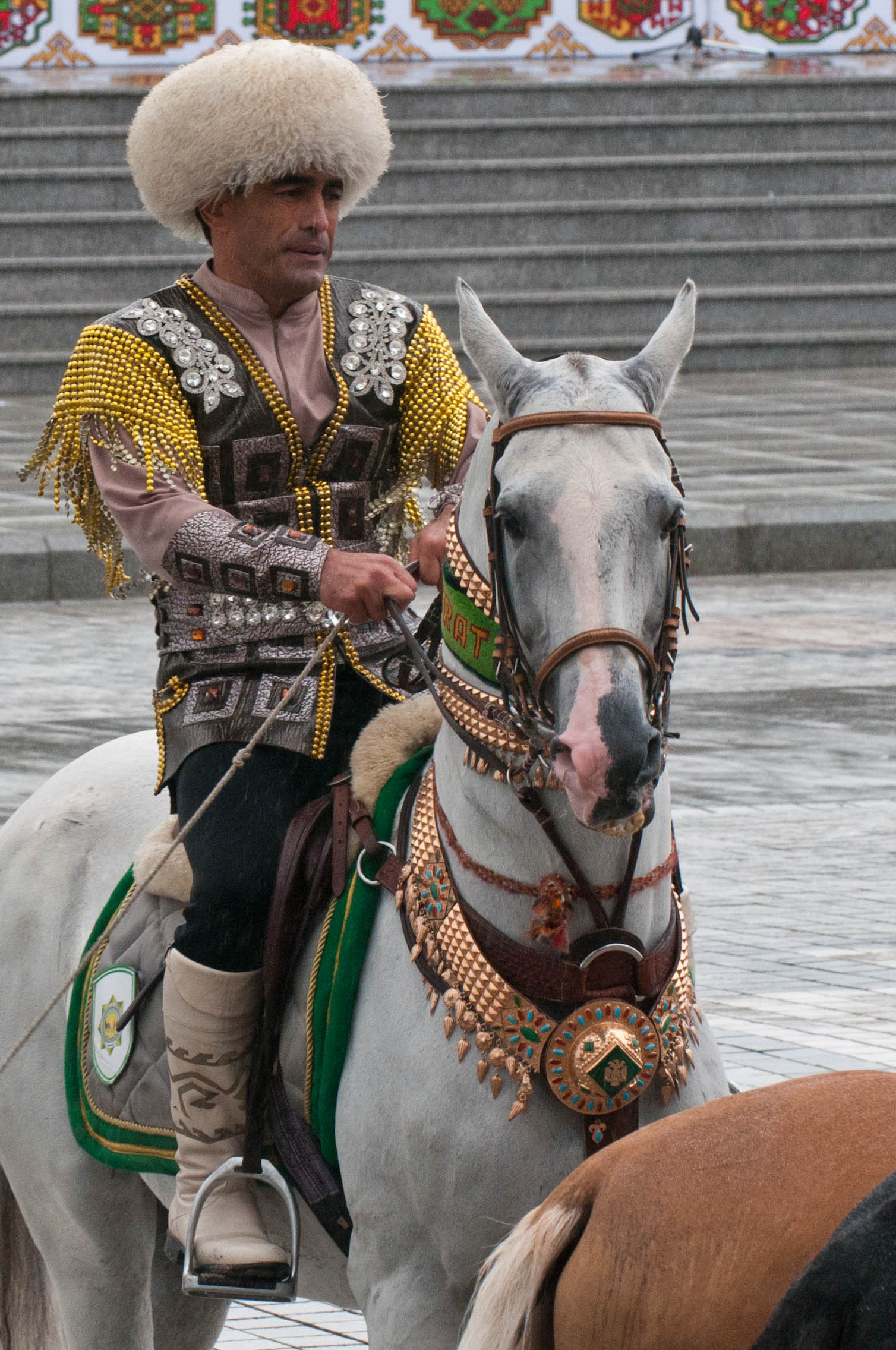
Major General Pygy Bayramdurdyevym, the former commander of the unit, on horseback in 2011.

The color guard escort during the parade in Moscow.

== See also ==
- 154th Preobrazhensky Independent Commandant's Regiment
- Kyiv Presidential Honor Guard Battalion
- Aibyn Presidential Regiment

== Links ==
- Turkmen Changing of the Guard
- Members of the battalion during the 2010 Moscow Victory Day Parade
- The battalion training at their barracks
- Türkmen Esgeri – Türkmen Askeri – Turkmen Soldier / Garaşsyzlyk binasy nobat üýtgeşigi
- Hormat Garawuly Batalýony RPK
