= Human rights in Turkmenistan =

Turkmenistan's human rights record is among the worst in the world and has been heavily criticized by various countries and scholars worldwide. Standards in education and health declined markedly during the rule of President Saparmyrat Nyýazow.

Since December 2006, under the Government of President Gurbanguly Berdimuhamedow, no significant improvements regarding human rights and civil liberty have been observed by international human rights organizations.

== Discrimination against ethnic minorities ==
The Turkmen government's decision to cancel a dual-citizenship agreement with Russia in 2003 prompted thousands of ethnic Russians to leave Turkmenistan as they lost their property. Many of those fleeing "in panic" reportedly feared being trapped in a state which has been widely criticised for human rights abuses and has imposed severe restrictions on foreign travel for its citizens. Those without Russian passports may be forced to become Turkmens, and fear that they may never be able to return to Russia.

For these who remained, estimated at 100,000, all Soviet-time diplomas, certificates and other official documents that were issued outside the Turkmen SSR were nullified, drastically limiting the people's access to work. At the same time, universities have been encouraged to reject applicants with non-Turkmen surnames, especially ethnic Russians. Russian television is difficult to receive in Turkmenistan. The Russian-language radio station Mayak was taken off the air, and the Russian newspapers were banned earlier.

It is forbidden to teach the customs and language of the Baloch, an ethnic minority. The same happened to Uzbeks, whose language is no longer taught in schools.

== Notable bans ==
Former President Saparmyrat Nyýazow banned the playing of video games, listening to car radios, performing opera and ballet, smoking in public, long hair on men, and even growing facial hair. It has been speculated that the latter ban was enacted to enforce conformity of appearance. Nyýazow ordered the closure of all libraries outside the capital of Ashgabat. News anchors, both men and women, were prevented from wearing any sort of make-up after Nyýazow discovered he was unable to tell the difference between them when the presenters wore it.

In 2008, the bans of circuses and operas were reversed, but the former leader Gurbanguly Berdimuhamedow banned the importation of cars and trucks produced before 2000.

As of 2017, Turkmenistan has signed the Ottawa Treaty on land mines, setting it apart from many of its neighbors (excluding Afghanistan).

== Freedom of religion ==
Freedom of religion is guaranteed by article 11 of the Constitution of Turkmenistan. However, like other human rights, in practice it does not exist. Former President Saparmyrat Nyýazow's book of spiritual writings, the Ruhnama, is imposed on all religious communities. According to Forum 18, despite international pressure, the authorities severely repress all religious groups, and the legal framework is so constrictive that many prefer to exist underground rather than have to pass through all of the official hurdles. Protestant Christian adherents are affected, in addition to groups such as Jehovah's Witnesses, Baháʼí, and Hare Krishna. Jehovah's Witnesses have been imprisoned and suffered beatings due to being conscientious objectors. For example, a 33-year-old member of the denomination was sentenced to a 4-year prison term after being found carrying religious literature at a train station in Daşoguz. The United Nations Human Rights Committee has indicated that Jehovah's Witness in Turkmenistan have been prosecuted and imprisoned for refusing to perform compulsory military service, despite Turkmenistan's Constitution guaranteeing the right to "practice any religion alone or in association with others" and the right to "freedom of conviction and the free expression of those convictions". The UN committee noted, "The State party should take all necessary measures to review its legislation with a view to providing for alternative military service. The State party should also ensure that the law clearly stipulates that individuals have the right to conscientious objection to military service. Furthermore, the State party should halt all prosecutions of individuals who refuse to perform military service on grounds of conscience and release those individuals who are currently serving prison sentences."

A July 2003 issue of state-owned newspaper Adalat, published by the Ministry of Justice, printed a vitriolic attack against members of some religious groups, describing the groups as foreign and implying they were dangerous. There, the government continues to restrict the freedom of parents of Jehovah's Witnesses to raise their children in accordance with their religious beliefs. Also, copies of Christian literature were confiscated by the government, including the Bible; the government claiming that it was not authentic Christian religious literature. In 2003, some Jehovah's Witnesses were denied exit visas. Other Witnesses who were able to obtain exit visas were stopped after crossing a border and forced to return. Others were stopped and prevented from boarding a flight to another country because their names were included on a "black list" of citizens prohibited from leaving the country.

The U.S. Department of State's 2005 Annual Report on International Religious Freedom (released November 8, 2005) indicates persistent restrictions on religious freedoms in Turkmenistan, while categorizing it among countries that had made "significant improvements in the promotion of religious freedom." U.S. Representative Chris Smith stated, however, "The reforms that were instituted by the Nyýazow regime over the past year did not go far enough, and even the report itself states that serious violations of religious freedom continue." U.S. Senator Sam Brownback noted, "Turkmenistan and Uzbekistan have clearly received more credit than the facts would warrant." The U.N. Special Rapporteur on Freedom of Religion or Belief, Asma Jahangir, appealed to the government of Turkmenistan in June 2003 and again in 2005 for an invitation to visit the country; an invitation was issued in 2008 and a one-week visit was completed in September 2008.

In 2023, the country was scored zero out of 4 for religious freedom; it was noted that restrictions have tightened since 2016. In the same year it was ranked the 26th worst place in the world to be a Christian.

== Slavery ==
According to Walk Free, "Turkmenistan is among countries taking the least action to respond to modern slavery". The 2023 Global Slavery Index estimated there were 72,000 people living in modern slavery in Turkmenistan. A report by the NGO coalition Cotton Campaign said, "The government uses widespread and systematic state-imposed forced labor in the annual cotton harvest. In 2018 the United States banned "All Turkmenistan Cotton or products produced in whole or in part with Turkmenistan cotton" due to findings of state-enforced slave labor.

== Freedom of expression ==
All mass media in Turkmenistan is controlled by the State. In July 2010, President Berdimuhamedow announced plans to allow private newspapers in the country. Once launched, they were expected to focus on successful business stories.

According to Reporters Without Borders' 2006 World Press Freedom Index, Turkmenistan had the third-worst press freedom conditions in the world, behind North Korea and Myanmar. It is considered to be one of the ten most censored countries. Each broadcast under Nyýazow began with a pledge that the broadcaster's tongue would shrivel if he slandered the country, flag, or president. While he was president, Nyýazow controlled all Turkmen media outlets, and personally appointed journalists. Controversy surrounds the death of Radio Free Europe/Radio Liberty journalist Ogulsapar Myradowa, who was apparently tortured to death in September 2006 while in state detention.

2022 Press Freedom Index Good situation Satisfactory situation Noticeable problems Difficult situation Very serious situation Not classified / No data

It has been reported that journalists have been harassed by the government; some have been kept in prison and prosecuted with false accusations and unfair trials. Journalists frequently receive death threats. Activist Sazak Durdymyradow was detained in 2005 for collaborating with a French TV channel for a report on Turkmenistan. He was sentenced to eight years in jail under the accusation of "illegal acquisition, possession or sale of ammunition or firearms". Amnesty International considers the accusations to be forged.

In 2006, Turkmen Helsinki Foundation for Human Rights activists Annagurban Amangylyjow and Sapardurdy Hajyýew were arrested by Turkmen security forces on espionage charges, later changed to illegal firearm charges. Amnesty International considers them prisoners of conscience and named them a 2011 "priority case." Front Line, Reporters Without Borders, and Human Rights Watch have all described the charges as fabricated. On 11 December 2010, the United Nations Working Group on Arbitrary Detention also called for their immediate release, stating that their detention was a violation of international law.

The freelance journalists collaborating with international media are being closely watched by the state's security departments. Correspondents for Radio Free Europe are under constant harassment and risk their life and liberty. On April 18, 2008, freelance journalist Sona Chuli-Kuli was interrogated for several days under physiological pressure and forced to sign a statement agreeing not to collaborate with the international media. In 2015, from 7 July until 19 May 2018, freelance journalist Saparmämmet Nepesgulyýew served a sentence on drug charges that human rights groups claim were fabricated in retaliation for his government critical reporting.

=== Internet ===
Individual access to the Internet was first authorized in 2008, and access has since increased.

Turkmenistan ranks among the most repressive and closed societies in the world. The Internet is heavily regulated and available only to a small fraction of the population. Censorship is ubiquitous and extensive. An investigation published in 2023 reveals the country blocks at least 122,000 domain names. Surveillance is significant, and the few citizens who benefit from access to the Internet are closely monitored by state agencies. Self-censorship is common.

Websites run by human rights organizations and news agencies are blocked. Moreover, ordinary citizens have no access to the World Wide Web, and instead are limited to the use of the Turkmenet, an online community in Turkmen language, but effectively a censored version of the Internet. Social networks such as Facebook, YouTube and Twitter (now known as X) are not accessible through the Turkmenet. Attempts to get around this censorship can lead to grave consequences. However, only Russian social networks Odnoklassniki and Mail Agent Chatting system are available. In addition to this, there is a newly founded (27 March 2012) local Turkmen social network, Gyzgyn, which is currently accessible.

Internet censorship in Turkmenistan was classified as pervasive in the political area and as selective in the social, conflict/security and internet tools areas by the OpenNet Initiative in December 2010. Turkmenistan was listed as an internet enemy by Reporters Without Borders in 2011.

=== Dissent in the public sector ===
In early April 2025, four employees of the Kerki district's cultural department in Turkmenistan were dismissed after protesting salary deductions intended to finance the purchase of a television monitor for the Palace of Culture. The monitor, which was to display images of President Serdar Berdimuhamedow against a national flag backdrop during official events, was purchased using 230 Turkmenistan Manat (TMT) deducted from employees' March salaries. This sum, equivalent to a significant portion of their average monthly income of 1,800-2,100 TMT, was collected without consent. Workers who refused the deduction were pressured by police to resign citing "health reasons." This incident follows a broader pattern of forced financial contributions in the public sector, including similar incidents in January 2025, where civil servants in Arkadag were pressured to buy homes, and in May 2024, where agency heads in Balkan Province were ordered to purchase souvenir watches.

== Political freedom ==
External videos
- Saparmurat Turkmenbashi sacks and arrests Prosecutor General Gurbanbibi Atajanova during live translation. She cries and pleads for her life
- Turkmen president Berdymuhammedow oversees the arrests of Turkmen officials
- Second wave of arrests of Turkmen officials

Any opposition to the government is considered treason and punishable by life imprisonment. Turkmenistan has many political prisoners, the most well-known of whom are Batyr Berdiýew, Ýazgeldi Gündogdyýew, and Boris Şyhmyradow. They are not granted any access by the International Red Cross, OSCE, or any medical institutions. There have been rumours of their deaths, but these cannot be confirmed, and the whereabouts of most are unknown.

In 2009, Muhammertguly Aýmyradow was freed after he completed his sentence.

Gulgeldi Annanyýazow, an opposition leader to Nyýazow's government, was arrested in 1995 and released in 1999 after a presidential amnesty decree. He moved to Norway to live with refugee status. Back in Turkmenistan, he was arrested in June 2008 and sentenced to 11 years in jail following a closed-door trial; the charges against him are unknown. Similarly, Öwezgeldi Ataýew, former Speaker of Parliament, and Akmyrat Rejepow, former head of the State Security Council, had closed-door trials and remain in prison. Amnesty International suspects that the reason for the imprisonments lies in the fact that both were potential political rivals of the current President Gurbanguly Berdimuhamedow.

Andrey Zatoka, environmentalist and activist, citizen of Turkmenistan and Russia, was arrested on false charges for 46 days from December 2006 to January 2007. Due to international pressure, Andrey was released and the sentence was canceled. In June 2008, Andrey wrote a statement reporting that his and his friends' liberty could be in danger. He was being monitored and followed by the Turkmen authorities. On October 20, 2009, Andrey was arrested for the second time and sentenced to 5 years in prison for assault. In November 2009, after international pressure from environmental and human rights organisations and Russian authorities, Zatoka was released upon payment of a fine, relinquishing his Turkmen citizenship and immediate emigration from Turkmenistan.

== Police brutality ==
Arbitrary arrests and mistreatment of detained persons are common in Turkmenistan, as is torture to obtain confessions. In 2004, border guards shot and killed six people who were allegedly illegally crossing the border from Iran. There are reports of prisoners dying after having food and medical care withheld. Ogulsapar Myradowa, a journalist and human rights activist, died violently in prison in September 2006.

In 2018's Country Reports on Human Rights Practices by the US State Department, Turkmenistan was condemned for "alleged torture", arbitrary arrests and detentions, involuntary confinement, imprisonment of political prisoners, severe corruption, lack of free and fair elections, and restrictions on freedom of religion, assembly, and movement.

== Historical situation ==
The following chart shows Turkmenistan's ratings since 1991 in the Freedom in the World reports, published annually by Freedom House. A rating of 1 is "free"; 7, "not free".^{1}

Historical ratings

Year	Political Rights	Civil Liberties	Status	President^{2}
1991	6	5	Partly Free	Saparmurat Niyazov
1992	7	6	Not Free	Saparmurat Niyazov
1993	7	7	Not Free	Saparmurat Niyazov
1994	7	7	Not Free	Saparmurat Niyazov
1995	7	7	Not Free	Saparmurat Niyazov
1996	7	7	Not Free	Saparmurat Niyazov
1997	7	7	Not Free	Saparmurat Niyazov
1998	7	7	Not Free	Saparmurat Niyazov
1999	7	7	Not Free	Saparmurat Niyazov
2000	7	7	Not Free	Saparmurat Niyazov
2001	7	7	Not Free	Saparmurat Niyazov
2002	7	7	Not Free	Saparmurat Niyazov
2003	7	7	Not Free	Saparmurat Niyazov
2004	7	7	Not Free	Saparmurat Niyazov
2005	7	7	Not Free	Saparmurat Niyazov
2006	7	7	Not Free	Saparmurat Niyazov
2007	7	7	Not Free	Gurbanguly Berdimuhamedow
2008	7	7	Not Free	Gurbanguly Berdimuhamedow
2009	7	7	Not Free	Gurbanguly Berdimuhamedow
2010	7	7	Not Free	Gurbanguly Berdimuhamedow
2011	7	7	Not Free	Gurbanguly Berdimuhamedow
2012	7	7	Not Free	Gurbanguly Berdimuhamedow
2013	7	7	Not Free	Gurbanguly Berdimuhamedow
2014	7	7	Not Free	Gurbanguly Berdimuhamedow
2015	7	7	Not Free	Gurbanguly Berdimuhamedow
2016	7	7	Not Free	Gurbanguly Berdimuhamedow
2017	7	7	Not Free	Gurbanguly Berdimuhamedow
2018	7	7	Not Free	Gurbanguly Berdimuhamedow
2019	7	7	Not Free	Gurbanguly Berdimuhamedow
2020	7	7	Not Free	Gurbanguly Berdimuhamedow
2021	7	7	Not Free	Gurbanguly Berdimuhamedow
2022	7	7	Not Free	Gurbanguly Berdimuhamedow
2023	7	7	Not Free	Serdar Berdimuhamedow

== See also ==
- Capital punishment in Turkmenistan
- Human rights in Asia
- Freedom of religion in Turkmenistan
- Human trafficking in Turkmenistan
- LGBT rights in Turkmenistan
- Owadan-Depe – famous Turkmen prison for dissidents

== Notes ==
1.Note that the "Year" signifies the "Year covered". Therefore the information for the year marked 2008 is from the report published in 2009, and so on.
2.As of January 1.
