= Borders of Kazakhstan =

International boundaries of Kazakhstan

Location of Kazakhstan in Central Asia

The borders of Kazakhstan are the international boundaries of the Republic of Kazakhstan. Kazakhstan shares land borders with five sovereign states: Russia, China, Kyrgyzstan, Uzbekistan and Turkmenistan. The total length of its land borders is approximately 13,398 kilometres (8,325 mi), according to Kazakhstan's official border demarcation data.

Kazakhstan has the world's longest continuous land border between two countries, shared with Russia. The country is also the world's largest landlocked country and has a coastline on the Caspian Sea.

Following Kazakhstan's independence in 1991, the country's first president, Nursultan Nazarbayev, initiated negotiations with all five neighbouring states to establish and legally define Kazakhstan's international borders. During his presidency, Kazakhstan concluded bilateral border delimitation agreements with China, Kyrgyzstan, Uzbekistan, Turkmenistan and Russia, resolving outstanding territorial issues through diplomatic negotiations.

The delimitation of Kazakhstan's land borders was completed on 18 January 2005, when Nazarbayev and Russian president Vladimir Putin signed the Treaty on the Kazakhstan–Russia State Border in Moscow. As a result, Kazakhstan became one of the first post-Soviet Central Asian states to complete the legal delimitation of its land borders with all neighbouring countries. The subsequent demarcation process involved physically marking the agreed boundaries on the ground.

== Overview ==
Kazakhstan shares land borders with five countries, with a total length of approximately 13,398 km.

Country	Length (km)	More information
Russia	7,548	Kazakhstan–Russia border
China	1,783	China–Kazakhstan border
Kyrgyzstan	1,257	Kazakhstan–Kyrgyzstan border
Uzbekistan	2,351	Kazakhstan–Uzbekistan border
Turkmenistan	459	Kazakhstan–Turkmenistan border
Total	13,398	
