= Kazakhstan–Turkmenistan relations =

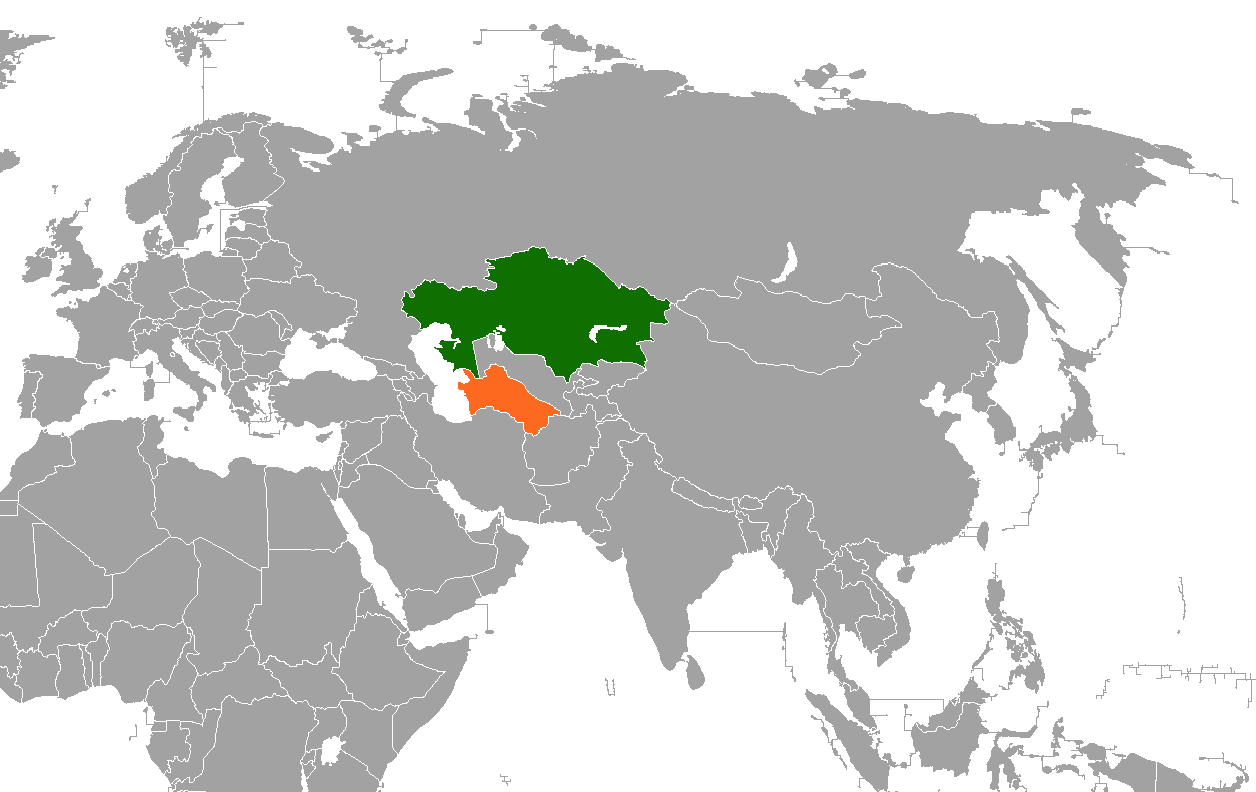

- Kazakhstan: Turkmenistan

Kazakhstan–Turkmenistan relations refers to the bilateral foreign relations between Kazakhstan and Turkmenistan. Kazakhstan has an embassy in Ashgabat. Turkmenistan has an embassy in Astana. Both countries were previously subordinated republics of the Soviet Union as Kazakh Soviet Socialist Republic and Turkmen Soviet Socialist Republic before the dissolution of the Soviet Union in 1991.

== Political relations ==
The political dialogue between the two countries has always been constructive, with no contradictions regarding key issues of bilateral relations or international policy. Turkmenistan pursues an isolated policy based on the principle of permanent neutrality, while Kazakhstan, on the contrary, seeks to conduct an open policy, actively participating in various international initiatives. Geopolitically, Turkmenistan is separated from any direct contact with Russia and China by Kazakhstan. Throughout the history of relations between the two countries, there have been no sources of tension; at the same time, the relationship is characterized by a degree of passivity. Turkmenistan and Kazakhstan remain entirely neutral toward each other. High-level talks are held on a regular basis, and all issues of mutual interest are addressed constructively. In the context of Turkic partnership, Kazakhstan and Turkmenistan maintain a loyal and cooperative stance in geopolitical relations, particularly in matters of military and political cooperation.

On 10–11 May 2013, President of Turkmenistan Gurbanguly Berdimuhamedow paid a state visit to Kazakhstan, during which he met with President Nursultan Nazarbayev and took part in the official inauguration ceremony of the Turkmenistan–Kazakhstan section of the transnational International North–South railway.

== Cultural Cooperation ==
Joint exhibitions and other events are held. In 2009, an international rally raid took place across the territories of Russia (Tatarstan and Orenburg Oblast), Kazakhstan, and Turkmenistan, the only stage of the 2009 Dakar Series. The rally was organized on the initiative of the presidents of Russia, Dmitry Medvedev; Kazakhstan, Nursultan Nazarbayev; and Turkmenistan, Gurbanguly Berdimuhamedow, and its significance went beyond that of a purely sporting event. The Silk Way Rally was intended to serve as another symbol of the enduring friendship and good-neighborly relations that have historically united the peoples of Turkmenistan, Russia, and Kazakhstan.

In May 2013, a presentation of Turkmen President Gurbanguly Berdimuhamedow’s book Medicinal Plants of Turkmenistan, translated into Kazakh, was held in Astana.

== See also ==
- Foreign relations of Kazakhstan
- Foreign relations of Turkmenistan
- Kazakhstan–Turkmenistan border
