= Human trafficking in Turkmenistan =

Turkmenistan ratified the 2000 UN TIP Protocol in March 2005.

In 2010 Turkmenistan was a source country for women subjected to human trafficking, specifically forced prostitution and for men in forced labor. Women from Turkmenistan were subjected to forced prostitution in Turkey. Men and women from Turkmenistan were subjected to conditions of forced labor in Turkey, including domestic servitude and also in textile sweatshops.

In 2010, the Government of Turkmenistan did not fully comply with the minimum standards for the elimination of trafficking; however, it made significant efforts to do so. Because the determination that the Government of Turkmenistan is making significant efforts is based in part on the government's commitments to take additional future steps over the next year, Turkmenistan was placed on Tier 2 Watch List for the second consecutive year. The government has indicated its commitment to implement the “Law on Combating Trafficking in Persons,” adopted in December 2007. The law identifies responsible ministries within the government to combat trafficking, and requires authorities to develop measures to prevent trafficking, prosecute traffickers, and assist victims. During the next reporting period, the government has agreed to provide facility space for a foreign-funded shelter for trafficking victims to be operated by IOM, and has also formally agreed to work with IOM to conduct a human trafficking awareness program for students in all five provinces of the country. Although the government did not demonstrate any efforts to investigate or prosecute trafficking offenses during 2009, in May 2010 the government demonstrated significant political will by adopting amendments to the criminal code that prescribed penalties for all forms of human trafficking.

The U.S. State Department's Office to Monitor and Combat Trafficking in Persons placed Turkmenistan in "Tier 3" in 2017 and 2023, noting that it was one of eleven countries which were seen as having a documented government policy or pattern of human trafficking.

In 2023, the Organised Crime Index gave Turkmenistan a score of 8.5 out of 10 for human trafficking, noting that government efforts to work against this crime were negligible.

== Prosecution (2009) ==
The Government of Turkmenistan demonstrated no significant law enforcement efforts during the reporting period. The government prohibits all forms of trafficking in persons through Article 129 of its criminal code - adopted in May 2010 - which prescribes penalties ranging from four to 25 years’ imprisonment. These penalties are sufficiently stringent and commensurate with those prescribed for other serious crimes, such as rape. The government reported no efforts to investigate, prosecute, convict, or punish any trafficking offenders during the reporting period. During the previous reporting period, the government reportedly investigated and prosecuted two cases of trafficking under non-trafficking statutes, although the government provided no information on whether the individuals prosecuted in these cases were convicted or sentenced to time in prison. The General Prosecutor's Office provided regular training for 10 to 15 prosecutors on trafficking in Ashgabat. Various international organizations also provided training for more than 100 officials from the State Migration, State Customs, and State Border Services on the legal anti-trafficking framework and general trafficking issues. Despite unconfirmed reports that some customs or migration officials were complicit in human trafficking, the government did not report efforts to investigate such officials for trafficking-related complicity. Although the Turkmenistan government did not form formal anti-trafficking partnerships with other foreign governments, it reportedly issued instructions to its foreign missions abroad to cooperate with foreign law enforcement authorities on trafficking cases.

== Protection (2009) ==
During the reporting period the Government of Turkmenistan demonstrated no efforts to protect or assist victims. The government did not provide medical assistance, counseling, shelter, legal assistance, or rehabilitative services to victims of trafficking, nor did it supply funding to international organizations or NGO's to provide services to victims. However, in April 2010, the government pledged to donate facility space for a trafficking shelter that will be foreign-funded and operated by IOM. The 2007 trafficking law has provisions for victim care facilities and guarantees protection and assistance for victims of trafficking, though these elements of the law were unimplemented during the reporting period. In 2009, 25 victims were assisted by non-government funded organizations, compared with 20 victims assisted by non-government funded organizations in 2008. The government did not refer any victims to NGOs or IOM for assistance in 2009. Government personnel employed no formal victim identification procedures and did not provide victim identification, victim referral, or victim sensitivity training for border guards or police. The government did not encourage victims to assist in trafficking investigations or prosecutions. There were no reports of victims being punished during the reporting period for unlawful acts committed as a direct result of their being trafficked. The government did not assist with the repatriation of foreign victims in 2009, and there were unconfirmed reports that some victims of trafficking were denied assistance by Turkmen consular officials in a destination country.

== Prevention (2009) ==
The Government of Turkmenistan did not demonstrate significant efforts to prevent human trafficking during the reporting period. The government did not fund or conduct any anti-trafficking awareness campaigns in 2009, although Turkmen citizens traveling to Turkey received written contact information for anti-trafficking organizations operating in Turkey if travelers end up needing trafficking assistance. However, in April 2010, the Ministries of Education and Health, in cooperation with IOM, formally agreed to conduct an information campaign in public schools for young adolescents. The campaign will be carried out in all five provinces of Turkmenistan by representatives of non-governmental organizations using Turkmen language publications and stories that warn of the hazards of human trafficking. The government made regular efforts, however, to monitor the trafficking situation within its borders.

== See also ==
- Human rights in Turkmenistan
