= Kazakhstan–Turkmenistan border =

International border

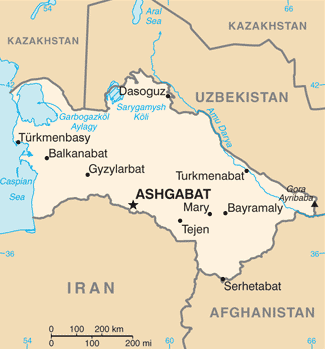
Map showing Turkmenistan with Kazakhstan to the north-west

Kazakhstani and Turkmen boundary markers

The Kazakhstan–Turkmenistan border is 413 kilometres (257 mi) in length and runs from the Caspian Sea to the tripoint with Uzbekistan. It is the shortest international boundary of both states.

== Description ==
The land border starts at the eastern shore of the Caspian Sea at Cape Sue, just to the north of the Turkmen town of Garabogaz, and traces an arc paralleling the Garabogazköl (Kara-Bogaz-Gol) lake, before finally following a short section along some hills in the Ustyurt plateau to the Uzbek tripoint.

== History ==
Russia had conquered Central Asia in the 19th century by annexing the formerly independent Khanates of Kokand and Khiva and the Emirate of Bukhara. After the Communists took power in 1917 and created the Soviet Union it was decided to divide Central Asia into ethnically-based republics in a process known as National Territorial Delimitation (or NTD). This was in line with Communist theory that nationalism was a necessary step on the path towards an eventually communist society, and Joseph Stalin's definition of a nation as being “a historically constituted, stable community of people, formed on the basis of a common language, territory, economic life, and psychological make-up manifested in a common culture”.

The NTD is commonly portrayed as being nothing more than a cynical exercise in divide and rule, a deliberately Machiavellian attempt by Stalin to maintain Soviet hegemony over the region by artificially dividing its inhabitants into separate nations and with borders deliberately drawn so as to leave minorities within each state. Though indeed the Soviets were concerned at the possible threat of pan-Turkic nationalism, as expressed for example with the Basmachi movement of the 1920s, closer analysis informed by the primary sources paints a much more nuanced picture than is commonly presented.

The Soviets aimed to create ethnically homogeneous republics, however many areas were ethnically-mixed (e.g. the Ferghana Valley) and it often proved difficult to assign a ‘correct’ ethnic label to some peoples (e.g. the mixed Tajik-Uzbek Sart, or the various Turkmen/Uzbek tribes along the Amu Darya). Local national elites strongly argued (and in many cases overstated) their case and the Soviets were often forced to adjudicate between them, further hindered by a lack of expert knowledge and the paucity of accurate or up-to-date ethnographic data on the region. Furthermore, NTD also aimed to create ‘viable’ entities, with economic, geographical, agricultural and infrastructural matters also to be taken into account and frequently trumping those of ethnicity. The attempt to balance these contradictory aims within an overall nationalist framework proved exceedingly difficult and often impossible, resulting in the drawing of often tortuously convoluted borders, multiple enclaves and the unavoidable creation of large minorities who ended up living in the ‘wrong’ republic. Additionally the Soviets never intended for these borders to become international frontiers as they are today.

Soviet Central Asia in 1922 before national delimitation

NTD of the area along ethnic lines had been proposed as early as 1920. At this time Central Asia consisted of two Autonomous Soviet Socialist Republics (ASSRs) within the Russian SFSR: the Turkestan ASSR, created in April 1918 and covering large parts of what are now southern Kazakhstan, Uzbekistan and Tajikistan, as well as Turkmenistan), and the Kirghiz Autonomous Soviet Socialist Republic (Kirghiz ASSR, Kirgizistan ASSR on the map), which was created on 26 August 1920 in the territory roughly coinciding with the northern part of today's Kazakhstan (at this time Kazakhs were referred to as ‘Kyrgyz’ and what are now the Kyrgyz were deemed a sub-group of the Kazakhs and referred to as ‘Kara-Kyrgyz’ i.e. mountain-dwelling ‘black-Kyrgyz’). There were also the two separate successor ‘republics’ of the Emirate of Bukhara and the Khanate of Khiva, which were transformed into the Bukhara and Khorezm People's Soviet Republics following the takeover by the Red Army in 1920.

On 25 February 1924 the Politburo and Central Committee of the Soviet Union announced that it would proceed with NTD in Central Asia. The process was to be overseen by a Special Committee of the Central Asian Bureau, with three sub-committees for each of what were deemed to be the main nationalities of the region (Kazakhs, Turkmen and Uzbeks), with work then exceedingly rapidly. There were initial plans to possibly keep the Khorezm and Bukhara PSRs, however it was eventually decided to partition them in April 1924, over the often vocal opposition of their Communist Parties (the Khorezm Communists in particular were reluctant to destroy their PSR and had to be strong-armed into voting for their own dissolution in July of that year).

The creation of Turkmenistan was hampered by a weak sense of Turkmen nationality, many of whom identified with their tribe first before that of the wider Turkmen identity. However, the Turkmen Communist elite pushed hard for the creation of a united Turkmen SSR, aided by the fact that the region was relatively homogeneous The main issue between the Kazakhs and Turkmen was the Mangyshlak region which had been used for many years by both nomadic Kazakhs and the Turkmen Yomut tribe, resulting in occasional clashes. It was decided to include the area within the Kazakh ASSR (Kazakh SSR from 1936) and today forms the Mangystau Region of Kazakhstan. The Turkmen SSR was officially created in 1924.

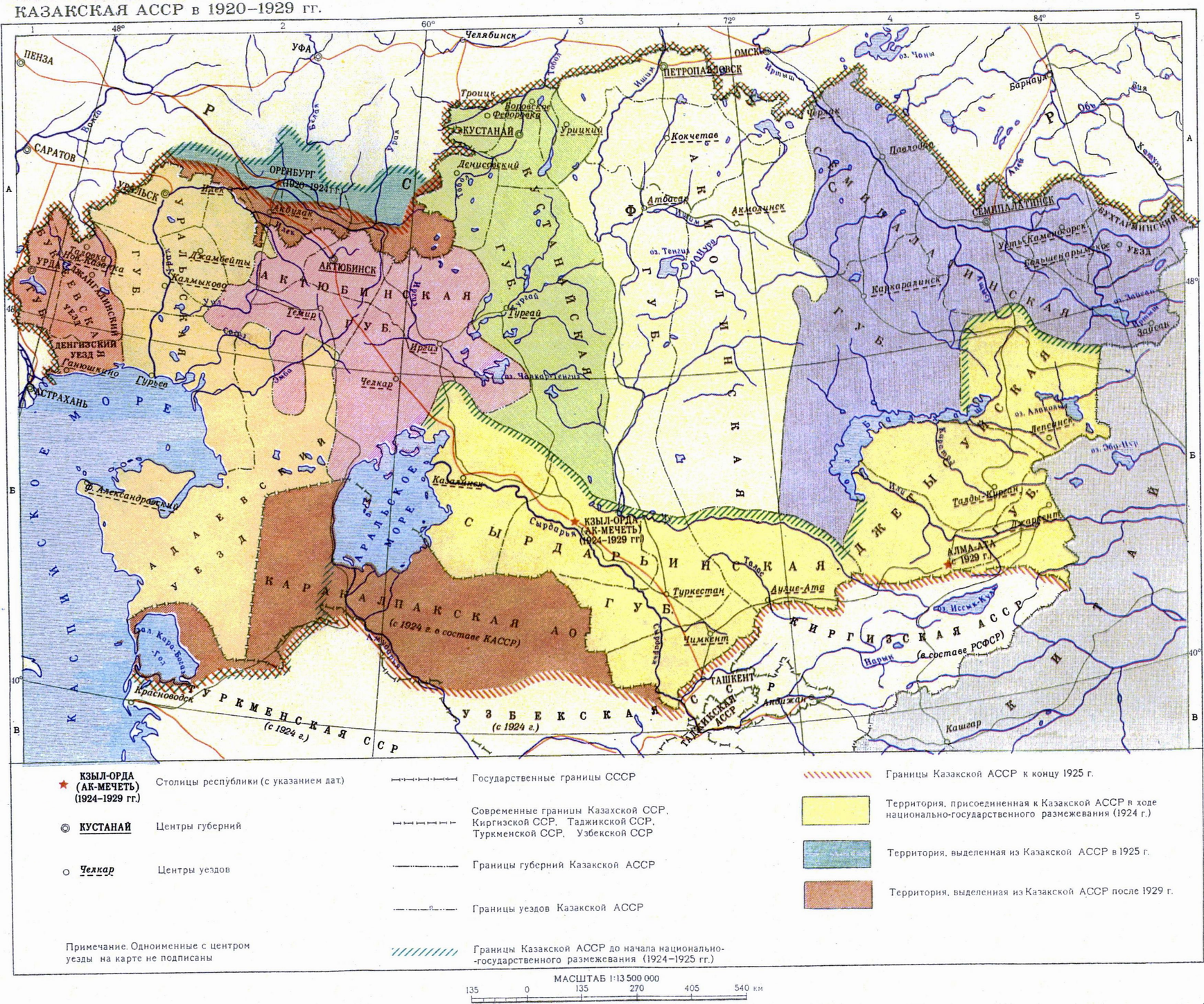
The Kazakh ASSR as depicted on a Russian map from 1938, showing the border cutting south of the lake

The border between Kazakhstan and Turkmenistan originally ran either in a straight line west from the Uzbek tripoint, cutting through the Garabogazköl (Kara-Bogaz-Gol) lake and then running through the lake's narrow inlet to the Caspian Sea, or parallel to the southern shore thereby giving Kazakhstan the entire lake (sources differ - see maps). In 1932 Soviet authorities decided to move the border northwards so as to include the entire lake within the Turkmen SSR, aiming to boost the industrial development of Turkmenistan by enabling them to exploit the lake's rich salt deposits. The border also originally extended further east during the period 1924-30 when a then much larger Karakalpakstan was part of the Kazakh ASSR (See Kazakhstan–Uzbekistan border).

The boundary became an international frontier in 1991 following the dissolution of the Soviet Union and the independence of its constituent republics. Kazakhstan and Turkmenistan held discussions on the border in 2000–2001 with an initial delimitation treaty being signed on 5 July 2001. The border was fully demarcated on the ground during the period 2003–2005.

In 2013 a new cross-border railway was opened by Presidents Gurbanguly Berdimuhamedow of Turkmenistan and Nursultan Nazarbayev of Kazakhstan.

In November 2026, a 44-kilometer paved section connecting Garabogaz city directly to the border of Kazakhstan was officially opened, replacing the previously road as part of the North–South Transport Corridor. The upgraded road features two 9-meter-wide carriageways, a 3.5-meter central median, and 3-meter shoulders on each side, paved with a 20-centimeter multi-layered asphalt concrete surface over sub-base gravel.

== Settlements near the border ==
=== Turkmenistan ===
- Garabogaz (formerly known as Bekdaş)

== Border crossings ==
There are two vorder crossings on the Kazakh-Turkmen border, one for road crossings, and one for railways.

- Temir-Baba (south of Kendirili) - Garabogaz (road)
- Bolaşaq – Serhetýaka (rail)

== See also ==
- Kazakhstan–Turkmenistan relations
