= Nurmuhammet Hanamow =

Nurmuhammet Çaryýewiç Hanamow (Russian: Нурмухаммед Чарыевич Ханамов, Nurmukhammed Charievich Khanamov, born 1 January 1945 in Tejen, Ashkhabad Oblast, Turkmen SSR) is a Turkmen politician. Although he served as the ambassador of Turkmenistan to Turkey and Israel during 2002, he is best known currently for his role as co-chairman of the Republican Party of Turkmenistan in exile.

Volodymyr Yelchenko, Ukraine's ambassador to Austria, was fired January 23, 2007, after he made an unauthorized offer of a visa to Ukraine for exiled Turkmen opposition leader Hudaýberdi Orazow. Orazow and opposition leader Nurmuhammet Hanamow allegedly visited Kyiv the week before and met with Ukrainian Transportation Minister Mykola Rudkovskiy, but this has been denied by several officials.

Hanamow was convicted in absentia in Turkmenistan on 29 December 2002 of crimes against the state.

== Personal life ==
Nurmuhammet Hanamow is the son of Chary Hanamow, a Soviet-era Hero of Socialist Labor and former director of the "Tejen" state farm.
