= Garabogaz =

Place in Turkmenistan

Garabogaz Garabogaz şäheri
- City
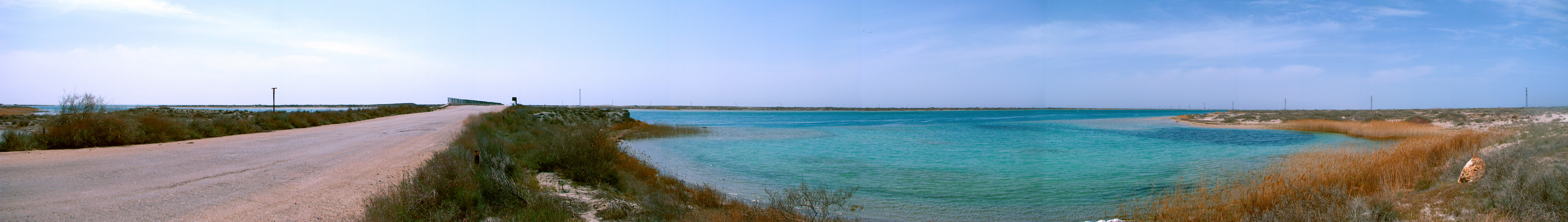

- Location in Turkmenistan
- Coordinates: 41°32′13″N 52°34′13″E
- Country: Turkmenistan
- Province: Balkan Province
- District: Türkmenbaşy District

Population (2022 official census)
  - Total: 7,877
- Time zone: UTC+5

Garabogaz (pronounced [ɢaɾaboɣoð]), formerly named Bekdaş ([bekˈdɑʃ]) is a city subordinate to Türkmenbaşy District, Balkan province, Turkmenistan, on the shore of the Caspian Sea. In 2002, the town of Bekdaş was promoted to the status of city and was renamed on the same occasion. As of 2022, the city reached a population of 7,877 people.

== Etymology ==
The city takes its name from the nearby Garabogaz gulf. Atanyýazow explains that the name originally applied to the narrow strait which connects the gulf to the Caspian Sea. Because water in the strait, termed a "throat" (Turkmen: bogaz), was darker than the water on either side, it was termed "dark" or "black" (Turkmen: gara), hence garabogaz. Over time the name was applied to the gulf itself and ultimately to the city. The previous name, Bekdaş, is taken from the name of a small hill nearby, on which a television antenna has been installed. The origin of bek is obscure; daş means "stone, rock" and Atanyýazow suggests it refers to the pebbles found in the area.

== Overview ==
The settlement occupies the northern tapering of a ridge before it becomes a narrow spit. These together divide the Garabogazköl lagoon from the Caspian Sea, with a small inlet channel to the south of the town. It has abundant and varied mineral resources from the highly saline lagoon. It is one of few places in the world where naturally deposited sodium sulfate exists in commercially exploitable quantities.

== Economy ==
Garabogaz is the site of one of Turkmenistan's three urea (carbamide) plants. The $1.3 billion Garabogaz plant, built by Mitsubishi Heavy Industries and GAP İnşaat (a subsidiary of Çalık Holding), was inaugurated on September 18, 2018, with a design capacity of 1.16 million tonnes of urea per year. Between January and October 2019, the Garabogaz plant produced approximately 392,000 tonnes of urea, of which 261,000 tonnes was exported. The plant operates a loading terminal for shipping urea via the Caspian.

A mineral salt extraction plant dating to the Soviet period is located 15 km northeast of the city. It was constructed over a period of ten years, between 1963 and 1973. It produces sodium sulfate as well as epsomite and Glauber's salt. It has a reported capacity to produce 400,000 tonnes of sodium sulfate per year, but in 1998 produced an estimated 55,000 tonnes, and in 2018, 26,000 tonnes.

== Transport ==
The city lies on the P-18 highway connecting the city of Türkmenbaşy with the border of Kazakhstan at Temir Baba. In November 2026, a 44-kilometer paved section connecting Garabogaz directly to the border of Kazakhstan was officially opened, replacing the previously road as part of the North–South Transport Corridor. The upgraded road features two 9-meter-wide carriageways, a 3.5-meter central median, and 3-meter shoulders on each side, paved with a 20-centimeter multi-layered asphalt concrete surface over sub-base gravel.

Garabogaz is served by a freight rail line. Plans were announced in 2018 to renovate the small municipal airport, which does not offer regular passenger service.

== Exile village ==
It serves as a spot of supervised exile in Turkmen law. Gulgeldi Annanyýazow is one person held there, since 2019.

== History ==
Prior to 1932 the town lay in what is now Kazakhstan.
