= Gulgeldi Annanyýazow =

Turkmenistani activist

- Occupation: Activist

Gulgeldi Annanyýazow is an activist from Turkmenistan. He was initially arrested in 1995 for organizing a peaceful protest. After four years, he was released under a presidential pardon and fled to Kazakhstan and eventually Norway. Following the death of Saparmyrat Nyýazow and the resulting change in government, he moved back to Turkmenistan in 2008. At that point, he was arrested again on charges of "illegal border crossing", and sentenced to eleven years in prison, even though the Turkmen criminal code stipulates a maximum sentence of ten years for that charge. Another five years were later added to the charge. He was released from prison in 2019, but is still in "conditions that amount to detention".

== Background and arrests ==
Turkmenistan became independent from the Soviet Union in 1991; however Saparmyrat Nyýazow remained president for life. In response to this, Annanyýazow along with other members of the "Ashgabat Eight" organized the country's first pro-democracy protest. The government of Turkmenistan routinely quashes dissidents.

Following his 1995 arrest, there were reports that he was subjected to torture, and one of his co-defendants, Çarymyrat Gurow, died in prison. He was released in January 1999, allegedly to coincide with a visit from Human Rights Watch to Turkmenistan.

Following his release, he left the country for Kazakhstan, and eventually Norway, where he received political asylum in 2002. Following the death of Nyýazow, Annanyýazow returned to Turkmenistan in 2008, hoping to contribute to democratic change. He was arrested again at a family home in 2008. He was sentenced to eleven years in prison in a closed trial on October 7.

His wife and three of his children remained in Norway. Another daughter was allegedly prevented from leaving Turkmenistan after his arrest.

He was exiled to Garabogaz in March 2019, a "Caspian coastal area where the salted air makes breathing difficult, and which takes days for visitors, including, family members in Ashgabat, to travel to visit", and where he is still being forced to work for the government. In May 2019, his family was allowed to visit him for the first time since his arrest.

== International response ==
The Working Group on Arbitrary Detention issued an opinion that the detention of Annanyýazow violated international law on 27 August 2013.

United States Senators Dick Durbin, Patrick Leahy, Sherrod Brown and Representative Tom Malinowski wrote a letter to Berdimuhamedow asking for the release of Annanyýazow, along with Nurgeldi Halykow and Hursanaý Ismatullaýewa in November 2021. He was also included in a letter, signed by eleven senators, calling for the release of unjustly detained prisoners in Central Asia.

The Ambassador from Norway to the OCSE emphasized Annanyýazow's case in relation to Turkmenistan's human rights record.
