= Ogulsapar Myradowa =

Turkmen activist and journalist (1948–2006)

- Born: 1948
- Died: 2006 (aged 57–58)
- Occupations: human rights activist, journalist
- Organization: RFE/RL
- Known for: 2006 arrest

Ogulsapar Myradowa (1948 – 2006) was a Turkmen human rights activist and Radio Free Europe journalist.

She was the sister of Annadurdy Hajyýew, a leader of the exiled Republican Party of Turkmenistan. She was arrested on June 18, 2006 with two other activists: her brother Sapardurdy Hajyýew, an associate of the Turkmen Helsinki Foundation for Human Rights, and Annagurban Amangylyjow. The state-controlled press accused them of smearing Turkmenistan's international reputation.

On June 19, President Saparmyrat Nyýazow personally issued a statement on national television condemning Muradova and other arrested activists. "I don't know why [the detainees] are engaged in such dirty business in Turkmenistan, a peaceful country where justice is ruling and where nobody is disgraced... Let people condemn the traitors. The entire population is proud of their motherland, whereas they are trying to harm it," Nyýazow said.

On August 25, 2006, the three activists were sentenced to between six and seven years in jail on charges of illegal possession of weapons.

The trial reportedly lasted less than two hours and defence lawyers were reportedly not given the indictment before the trial commenced.

Myradowa died in prison before September 14, 2006 of "natural causes", according to Turkmen officials; her children said that her body had "marks on the neck" and a "large wound" on the head.

International human rights groups have expressed outrage over her death and called for an independent investigation into the circumstances that led to it.
