= Freedom of religion in Turkmenistan =

According to U.S. government estimates, in 2022 Turkmenistan is 89% Muslim (mostly Sunni), 9% Eastern Orthodox Christian and 2% other religions. In 2023, the country was scored zero out of 4 for religious freedom; it was noted that restrictions have tightened since 2016. In the same year it was ranked the 26th worst place in the world to be a Christian.

== Religion in Turkmenistan ==
The Turkmen of Turkmenistan, like their neighbors in Uzbekistan, Afghanistan, and Iran are predominantly Muslim. As a whole, Turkmenistan is 89% Muslim and 9% Eastern Orthodox. Most ethnic Russians are Orthodox Christians. According to the 2022 U.S. Department of State Religious Freedom Report,

There are small communities of Jehovah's Witnesses, Shia Muslims, Baha'is, Roman Catholics, the International Society for Krishna Consciousness, and evangelical Christians, including Baptists and Pentecostals. Most ethnic Russians and Armenians identify as Orthodox Christian and generally are members of the Russian Orthodox Church or Armenian Apostolic Church. Some ethnic Russians and Armenians are also members of smaller Protestant groups. There are small pockets of Shia Muslims, consisting largely of ethnic Iranians, Azeris, and Kurds, some located in Ashgabat, with others along the border with Iran and in the western city of Türkmenbaşy. According to the Israeli embassy, approximately 300 Jews live in the country.

The great majority of Turkmen readily identify themselves as Muslims and acknowledge Islam as an integral part of their cultural heritage. However, there are some who only support a revival of the religion's status merely as an element of national revival.

The Constitution provides for freedom of religion and does not establish a state religion; however, in practice the Government imposes legal restrictions on all forms of religious expression. All groups must register in order to gain legal status; unregistered religious activity is illegal and may be punished by administrative fines. While the 1996 law on religion and subsequent 1999 amendments had effectively restricted registration to only the two largest groups, Sunni Muslim and Russian Orthodox, and criminalized unregistered religious activity, presidential decrees issued in 2000 dramatically reduced the numerical thresholds for registration and abolished criminal penalties for unregistered religious activity; civil penalties remain. As a result, nine minority religious groups were able to register, and the Turkmenistan government has permitted some other groups to meet quietly with reduced scrutiny.

There was no substantial change in the degree of religious tolerance by the Turkmenistan government during the period covered by this report, and there were troubling developments in the treatment of some unregistered groups. Following a sharp decrease in harassment of both registered and unregistered groups in late 2006, mistreatment of some registered and many unregistered religious minority group members, similar to that in previous reporting periods, resumed in February 2007. On December 21, 2006, President Saparmurat Niyazov died. The State Security Council appointed Deputy Chairman of the Cabinet of Ministers and Minister of Health Gurbanguly Berdimuhammedov Acting President; Berdimuhammedov was elected president in February, 2007. During the reporting period there were no indications the Turkmenistan government planned to rescind or modify previous policies regarding religious freedom. The Turkmenistan government threatened members of minority religious groups with fines, loss of employment and housing, and imprisonment because of their beliefs.

There were no reports of societal abuses or violence based on religious beliefs or practice. The overwhelming majority of citizens identify themselves as Sunni Muslim; ethnic Turkmen identity is linked to Islam. Ethnic Turkmen who choose to convert to other religious groups, especially the lesser-known Protestant groups, are viewed with suspicion and sometimes ostracized, but Turkmenistan society historically has been tolerant and inclusive of different religious beliefs.

== Status of religious freedom ==
=== Legal and policy framework ===
The Constitution provides for freedom of religion; however, in practice the Government restricts these rights. The criminal code outlaws violations of religious freedom or persecution by private actors; in practice it is not enforced. In 2004 the Government published amendments to the 2003 law on religion that reduced numerical thresholds for registration from 500 members to 5, and made all minority groups eligible to register. The amendments established two categories of religious assemblies: religious groups (comprising at least 5 and fewer than 50 members of legal age) and religious organizations (comprising at least 50 members). The amendments leave significant gray areas in the law.

The 2003 law requires all religious organizations to register, made operation of unregistered religious organizations a criminal offense, further restricted religious education, and monitored financial and material assistance to religious groups from foreign sources. In response to international pressure, a 2004 presidential decree lifted criminal penalties. The remaining civil law continues to allow the Government to control religious life and to restrict the activities of all religious groups. The 2003 law did not codify religious activities in localities other than where a group was registered. In October 2005 the Government announced a temporary procedure for the registration of religious groups' regional branches by issuing powers of attorney. Ministry of Justice (MOJ) representatives also stated that amendments would be made to the 2003 law on religion that would codify the branch registration issue, but this did not happen during the reporting period.

Former President Niyazov signed a decree in 2004 that strengthened the 2003 law on religious practice and religious organizations and increased registration fees for religious organizations to $100 (2.5 million manat at the unofficial rate). In addition the decree relieved the MOJ of the obligation to publish in the local media a list of registered religious organizations for transparency. Without a published list, legally registered groups were more isolated and the public was less able to respond when authorities harassed registered groups. The law also gave the MOJ the right to cancel a group's registration based on vaguely defined charges.

The government-appointed Council on Religious Affairs (CRA) reports to the president and ostensibly acts as an intermediary between the government bureaucracy and registered religious organizations. It includes Sunni Muslim imams and the head of the Russian Orthodox Church, as well as government representatives, but no representatives of minority religious groups. In practice the CRA acts as an arm of the state, exercising direct control over the hiring, promotion, and firing of both Sunni Muslim and Russian Orthodox clergy as well as helping to control all religious publications and activities. Its writ is enforced by security forces, specifically the Sixth Department of the Ministry of Internal Affairs, and it has no role in promoting interfaith dialogue. Although the Government does not officially favor any religion, it has provided financial and other support to the CRA for the construction of new mosques. The Government also pays most Muslim clerics' salaries, approves all senior cleric appointments, and requires the latter to report regularly to the CRA.

Until June 2004 government entities at all levels, including the courts, had interpreted the laws in such a way as to discriminate against those practicing any faith other than Sunni Islam or Russian Orthodox Christianity, whose congregations represented the only two registered religious groups. A 2004 decree reduced the minimum required number of adherents for registration, however, and in the year following the decree, nine additional religious groups registered: the Evangelical Christian Baptist Church of Turkmenistan, Seventh-day Adventist Church of Turkmenistan, Baha'i Community of Turkmenistan, Society for Krishna Consciousness (Hare Krishnas), Full Gospel Christian Church of Turkmenistan (Pentecostals), Light of the East Church (Dashoguz Pentecostal Church), Greater Grace Church of Turkmenistan, International Church of Christ, and the New Apostolic Church of Turkmenistan. Each of these groups comprised fewer than 50 members.

Shi'a Muslims remained unregistered, and there were no reports that they tried to register since the March 2004 decree, although they remained in contact with the CRA.

In practice government policies, including those at the city level such as zoning regulations on the use of private residences, have created difficulties for some groups in finding places to hold worship services. According to the national residential code, no religious activity is allowed in private homes or in public halls located in residential areas. However, two registered religious groups, the Baha'i community and the Krishna Consciousness Society, were permitted to conduct worship meetings in homes.

Unregistered religious groups and unregistered branches of religious groups are forbidden to conduct religious activities, including gathering, disseminating religious materials, and proselytizing. Government authorities have disrupted meetings of unregistered religious groups. Participants in those groups are subject to fines and administrative (not criminal) arrest under the administrative code. The Government prohibits foreign missionary activity and foreign religious organizations; however, the law does not restrict the worship choices of foreigners.

The Government has incorporated some aspects of Islamic tradition in its effort to redefine a national identity. For example, the Government has built large, monumental mosques, such as the ones in Ashgabat, Gokdepe, and Gypjak. Despite its embrace of certain aspects of Islamic culture, the Government is concerned about foreign Islamic influence and the interpretation of Islam by local believers. The Government promotes a moderate understanding of Islam based on Turkmen religious and national traditions. In April 2007, President Berdimuhammedov visited Saudi Arabia and performed umrah (minor pilgrimage) rituals in Mecca, recalling former President Niyazov's 1992 umrah.

The CRA has urged imams to accord greater attention to President Niyazov's spiritual-social books on culture and heritage, Ruhnama and Ruhnama II, by teaching them as holy texts and placing them next to the Qur'an in some mosques. Although the country elected a new president in February 2007, this policy did not change. Phrases from the Ruhnama are inscribed on the large mosque in former President Niyazov's home village of Gypjak.

In 2003 the widely respected former mufti of the country, Nasrullah Ibn Ibadullah, was replaced, secretly tried, and sentenced in 2004 to 22 years in prison. Ibn Ibadullah's replacement, Kakageldi Wepayev, was subsequently placed under house arrest for "misbehavior"-allegedly including drinking and womanizing-and replaced in 2004 by then 27-year-old recent seminary graduate Rowshen Allaberdiyev.

Mosques and Muslim clergy are state-sponsored and financed. The Russian Orthodox Church and other religious groups are independently financed. The Government recognizes only Sunni Muslim holy days as national holidays. These include Gurban Bairam (Eid al-Adha), a 3-day holiday commemorating the end of the Hajj, and Oraza-Bairam (Eid al-Fitr), commemorating the end of Ramadan, the Muslim month of fasting.

The Government does not offer alternative civilian service for conscientious objectors; individuals who want to refuse military service for religious reasons are offered noncombatant roles within the military. Until June 2007, conscripted members of the Jehovah's Witnesses were returned home unharmed several days after being called up, although they were not given papers excusing them from military service, which are needed for employment. This policy changed in June 2007, however, when three Jehovah's Witnesses were arrested and charged with avoiding military service.

There is no official religious instruction in public schools; however, the Government requires all public schools and institutes of higher learning to hold regular instruction on the Ruhnama. The Ministry of Education requires that each child bring a personal copy of the Ruhnama to school. President Berdimuhammedov raised the issue of education reform in January 2007 but there was no change in the Ruhnama policy by the end of the reporting period.

Article Six of the November 2004 law allows mosques to provide religious education to children after school for 4 hours a week with the approval of parents. Persons who graduate from institutions of higher religious education (the law does not specify domestic or international institutions) and who obtain CRA approval may provide religious education. Citizens have the right to receive religious education individually or with other persons; however, the law prohibits providing religious education in private, and those who do so are subject to punitive legal action. Although some independent religious education exists, the Government has done nothing to promote religious education beyond the official version incorporating the Ruhnama. Some Sunni mosques have regularly scheduled classes on the Qur'an.

The 2003 law prohibits the ROC from conducting religious education programs without CRA and presidential approval, and there were no reports that either the CRA or the President approved such programs. Homeschooling usually is allowed only in cases of severe illness or disability and not for religious reasons.

The Government, through the CRA, does little to promote interfaith understanding or dialogue beyond that between Muslims and Russian Orthodox Christians.

=== Restrictions on religious freedom ===
The Government officially has banned only extremist groups advocating violence, but it also categorized Islamic groups advocating stricter interpretation of Islamic religious doctrine as "extremist." The activities of unregistered religious groups remained illegal, with violators subject to fines and administrative arrest under the administrative code.

During the reporting period, at least four religious groups, all of which sought several times to register, continued to be denied legal status; as in previous years, the Government delayed or denied applications, citing technical reasons, including the requirement that the head of the group have "higher education." The Roman Catholic Church remained unregistered because of a conflict with local law requiring that the head of the Church be a citizen of the country.

Other groups either remained fearful of registering, citing the amount and type of information the Government required, or refused on principle to do so.

Registered religious minority groups reported few instances of harassment. However, in two cases regional affiliates of registered groups experienced harassment by provincial and district law enforcement agencies. Some of these groups found that by routinely notifying the Government of their gatherings and events and inviting government representatives to attend, they experienced decreased government harassment.

The Government restricted unregistered religious groups from establishing places of worship, and violations constituted an administrative offense. Registered groups also experienced difficulties establishing and maintaining places of worship; several groups stated that their largest obstacle was a lack of funds to rent a public hall. Several groups said they would prefer to buy a worship center or land to establish a permanent one, but municipal authorities raised insurmountable bureaucratic hurdles. Five registered minority religious groups have established public places of worship; three were rented and two were private residential homes of group members. The Government did not restrict some worship services in private homes, and the CRA assisted several registered minority groups to locate suitable worship locations. The Government forbids unregistered religious groups or unregistered branches of registered religious groups from gathering publicly or privately and can punish individuals or groups who violate these prohibitions. Some unregistered congregations continued to practice quietly, largely in private homes.

The Government also controls access to Islamic education. The theology faculty at Turkmen State University in Ashgabat had been the only academic faculty to conduct Islamic education. In July 2005 the President dissolved the theology faculty and incorporated the theology students and curriculum into the university's history department, leaving no official Islamic academic faculty.

The Government does not officially restrict persons from changing their religious beliefs and affiliation, but ethnic Turkmen members of unregistered religious groups accused of proselytizing and disseminating religious material generally receive harsher treatment than nonethnic Turkmen. During this reporting period, there was one report of local government officials attempting to force an ethnic Turkmen Christian convert to renounce his faith.

There were three high-level officials in the Government with a Russian Jewish heritage, and at least one deputy minister who is Russian Orthodox. No representatives of other minority religious groups were known to be working at senior or mid-level government positions during the reporting period. Some minority religious group adherents remained members of the only political party but feared openly acknowledging their faith out of concern for political reprisal.

The Government monitored minority religious groups, particularly those perceived to have connections with or support from a supranational hierarchy. The law prohibits foreign missionary activity, although in practice both Christians and Muslims working in the country in other capacities engaged in religious outreach. The 2003 law on religion stipulated that religious groups must report any financial or material assistance received from foreign sources. The Government denies visas to foreigners suspected of conducting or intending to conduct missionary activity.

By decree, publishing religious literature was prohibited, limiting the availability of Qur'ans, Bibles and other religious literature. Sacred religious books were rarely available for purchase. In practice the CRA must approve imported religious literature. Since all members of the CRA are either government officials, Sunni Muslims or members of the ROC, minority religious groups were disadvantaged regarding importing of religious materials. When the CRA approves the importation of a publication, the number of imported copies cannot exceed the number of registered group members. The Dashoguz office of the CRA required that its officers stamp religious literature, including Bibles and Qur'ans, in order to authorize it. During the reporting period, a leader of an unregistered church in Dashoguz reported that officials confiscated religious literature from him on a train and intercepted religious literature that had been mailed to him.

The Government enforced the use of former President Niyazov's books, Ruhnama and Ruhnama II, in educational institutions, government offices, and mosques. Copies of the book were kept in most mosques, and authorities have pressured religious leaders to place it alongside the Qur'an and to preach Ruhnama in their services.

In 2004 the Government formally lifted the exit visa requirement, theoretically permitting travel by all those who wished to participate in the Hajj or other travel for religious purposes; however, the Government maintained a "black list" of individuals and continued to limit freedom of movement, including in cases where individuals wanted to travel outside the country in order to conduct religious study. The Government continued to limit participation in the annual pilgrimage to Mecca (the Hajj), specifying that only 188 pilgrims (one plane load) personally approved by the President, out of the country's quota of 4,600, would be allowed to travel to Mecca. The national airline provided transportation free of charge.

According to Forum 18, the Government on January 6, 2007, refused to grant permission to Merdan Shirmedov, a Protestant from an ethnic Turkmen fellowship in Dashoguz, to leave the country to join his pregnant wife, Wendy Lucas in the United States. Lucas said that on April 10, 2007, Shirmedov tried to cross the border to Uzbekistan, but was prevented from leaving after Turkmenistan border guards found his name on a computerized exit blacklist. Officials refused to tell him why he was barred from leaving.

Foreign members of registered and unregistered religious groups continued to be denied entry visas.

Several registered religious minority groups reported that the Government monitored them by attending their gatherings; nonetheless, communities continued to engage in regular activities. Officers from the Sixth Department in Ashgabat, the division charged with fighting organized crime and terrorism, were still charged with monitoring members of religious minorities.

The Government continued to discriminate against members of religious groups with respect to employment.

=== Abuses of religious freedom ===
Following a sharp decrease in harassment of both registered and unregistered groups in late 2006, mistreatment of some registered and many unregistered religious minority group members resumed following the inauguration of President Berdimuhammedov in February 2007. The Government threatened members of minority religious groups with fines, loss of employment and housing, and imprisonment because of their beliefs. There were also reports of raids.

According to Forum 18, Ministry for National Security (MNB) officials arrested Vyacheslav Kalataevsky, a Baptist leader from Türkmenbaşy, on March 12, 2007, and on May 14 he was sentenced to 3 years' imprisonment in a labor camp on criminal charges of illegally crossing the border in 2001. In 2001, authorities had deported Kalataevsky without documents to Kazakhstan, and after a week he crossed back into the country to rejoin his wife and children.

Forum 18 also reported the arrest on May 19 of the leader of a Council of Churches Baptist congregation in Türkmenbaşy City, Yevgeny Potolov. The report speculated that Potolov, a Russian citizen, had also been arrested for entering the country illegally in 2001; authorities had deported Potolov to Kazakhstan, but he had returned to Turkmenistan to rejoin his wife and children.

During incidents involving police detaining and questioning members of unregistered minority religious groups, authorities took a range of actions including: filming those present; recording the names, addresses, and places of work of the congregants; threatening fines and imprisonment; and confiscating religious literature. With the exception of the Kalataevsky and Potolov cases, there were fewer reports of prolonged detention or physical abuse.

The fate of an estimated 30 suspected "Wahhabis" reportedly detained in Ashgabat in August 2005 remains unknown.

The country's former mufti, Nasrullah ibn Ibadullah, remained in prison serving a 22-year sentence. Ibadullah had been dismissed as mufti in 2003, reportedly in part for his refusal to teach the Ruhnama as a sacred text and in March 2004 was secretly tried and convicted, reportedly for his alleged role in a failed 2002 assassination attempt on Niyazov. Little was known about the whereabouts or the condition of Ibadullah, despite calls from the international community for access to him and for his release. Amnesty International reported in early 2007 that his family was increasingly concerned for his safety.

Jehovah's Witnesses have reported a number of beatings, arrests, fines and imprisonments of its members in Turkmenistan for conscientious objection and other charges related to their religious activities.

On April 29, 2007, an unidentified official—possibly from the Sixth Department of the Ministry of Internal Affairs—demanded and then fled with the travel documents of three members of an unregistered Mary-based group who were traveling by train to Dashoguz province to meet with a religious leader. A transportation official, finding the three group members without documents, returned them by train to Ashgabat the same day.

On April 19, 2007, officials from the Ministry of Internal Affairs' Sixth Department raided a branch of the registered Evangelical Baptist Church of Turkmenistan in Türkmenbaşy. The authorities came to a worship service, and took Bibles and hymnals from the congregation. That evening, police summoned two women to a local official's office and fined them approximately $90 (2.5 million manat), threatening further harassment if the women did not pay. The police gave no specific reason for the harassment, but suggested that the women ought to be attending a Russian Orthodox Church.

In early 2007 law enforcement officials reportedly raided a meeting of the registered group Svet Vostoka (Light of the East) Pentecostal church in Dashoguz.

On March 18, 2007, authorities raided a meeting of an unregistered religious group in Abadan and fined home owners.

On February 4, 2007, a group of law enforcement officers, who refused to show identification or a search warrant, raided the private house of the leader of an unregistered Christian group, where a wide circle of relatives and family friends were gathered. The inhabitants of the house were not conducting any religious activities. For five hours, the group of officers videotaped the people and belongings inside the house.

A Hare Krishna representative reported that harassment from officials had decreased since her group's registration; there were no reports of authorities beating Hare Krishnas during this reporting period. In October 2006, as part of a general annual prison amnesty, former President Niyazov released imprisoned Hare Krishna follower Ceper Annaniyazova, who had been sentenced to seven years in prison in November 2005 for having illegally crossed the border in 2002.

The Government did not destroy any mosques during the reporting period and, in fact, resumed renovation of a mosque in Mary City and on a mosque in the new president's home village. One mosque in Türkmenbaşy was destroyed in 2006. In 2004 at least six mosques were destroyed, some for no stated reason, others ostensibly for Ashgabat city "beautification" plans. In 2004 a Sunni cemetery north of the capital was leveled. Another cemetery in Ashgabat was being encroached upon by a high-rise development. In 2004 Muslims in Bagyr, a predominantly Kurdish suburb of Ashgabat, reported they could no longer bury their family members in traditional cemeteries but instead were obliged to use a centralized location. The Government restricts the number of mosques by requiring permission for construction. Government policy is that every community should have one mosque; however, in 2004 President Niyazov ordered that no more mosques were to be built without CRA approval and stated mosques would henceforth be led by state-appointed imams.

=== Forced religious conversion ===
There were no reports of forced religious conversion, including of minor U.S. citizens who had been abducted or illegally removed from the United States, or of the refusal to allow such citizens to be returned to the United States.

Improvements and Positive Developments in Respect for Religious Freedom

Registered minority religious groups generally continued to report lower levels of harassment.

In a May 2007 meeting with embassy officers, the Deputy Chairman of the CRA agreed in principle to hold another minority religious group roundtable to discuss pressing concerns, similar to the one held on October 20, 2005.

The CRA intervened on one occasion during the reporting period to release religious literature that had been embargoed by the Customs Department.

== Societal abuses and discrimination ==
There were no reports of general societal abuses based on religious belief or practice during the period covered by this report.

Many Muslims do not regularly attend mosques; however, the overwhelming majority of the population identify themselves as "Muslim," and national identity is linked to Islam. (Turkmen society considers an individual to be born into an ethno-religious group.) Departures from the pattern are rare and either receive little support or are criticized. Ethnic Turkmen who choose to convert from Islam to other religious groups are viewed with suspicion and sometimes ostracized.

Despite strong ties between Islam and national identity, the society historically has been tolerant and inclusive of different religious beliefs. For example, in the early part of the 20th century Ashgabat was a refuge for Baha'is escaping persecution in Iran, and a Baha'i temple was built in the city at that time. Government repression of minority religious groups does not reflect doctrinal or societal friction between the Muslim majority and minority religious groups. Rather, it reportedly reflects the Government's concern that the proliferation of nontraditional religious groups could undermine state control, promote civil unrest, facilitate undue influence by foreign interests, and destabilize the Government. There is also a societal distrust of foreign-based religious groups and the belief that Islam from outside the country is "Wahhabist"—extremist.

== See also ==
- Religion in Turkmenistan
- Human rights in Turkmenistan
