= Republican Party of Turkmenistan =

Political party in Turkmenistan

Republican Party of Turkmenistan Türkmenistanyň Respublikan partiýasy
- Leader: Nurmuhammet Hanamow; Annadurdy Hajyýew
- Founded: 29 May 2003
- Headquarters: Vienna (in exile)
- Ideology: Liberalism
- Colours: Yellow, Blue, Red

The Republican Party of Turkmenistan (Turkmen: Türkmenistanyň Respublikan partiýasy) is one of several dissident political parties that have been outlawed within Turkmenistan. Leaders of the exile-based RPT include Nurmuhammet Hanamow who went into exile in 2002 and Annadurdy Hajyýew, whose sister Ogulsapar Myradowa died in a Turkmen prison in September 2006. The latest opposition party, RPT operates in exile - since all opposition is banned within Turkmenistan, it was forced to form and operate from abroad.

== Turkmen in exile ==
There are two major groupings of Turkmen in exile. The first are opposition or dissidents, usually of a democratic bent. The second are exiled Turkmen politicians, often former high-ranking government officials who were incriminated in Nyýazow's alleged attempted murder in November 2002, reformists of varying stripes.

With the death of Saparmyrat Nyýazow on December 21, 2006, some thought the situation might change, possibly opening for the expansion of multiple parties within the nation, but such hopes did not materialize, as Nyýazow's successor Gurbanguly Berdimuhamedow made no substantial changes to the country's system, with the DPT remaining the ruling party and only Nyýazow's cult of personality being reduced.

== See also ==
- Politics of Turkmenistan
