= Saparmämmet Nepesgulyýew =

Freelance journalist who has contributed to Alternative Turkmenistan News

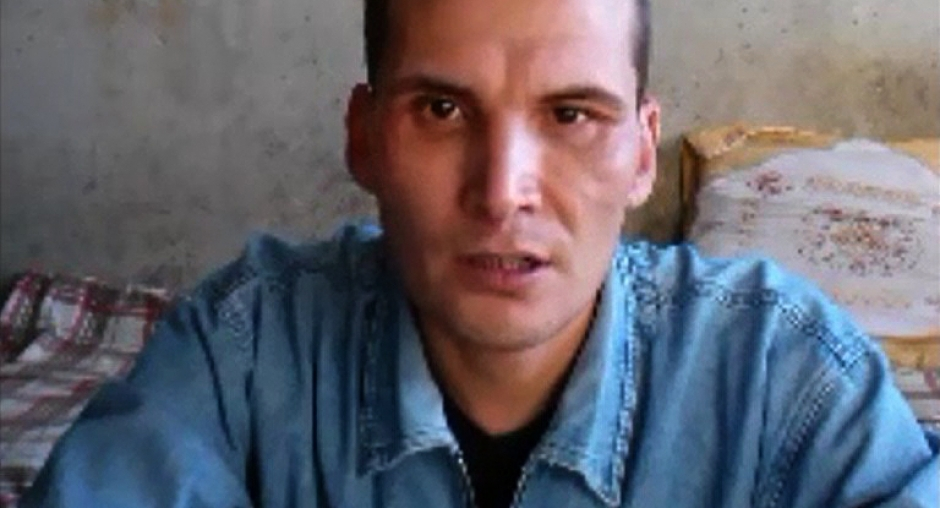
- Saparmämmet Nepesgulyýew in 2016
- Occupation: journalist
- Organization(s): Alternative Turkmenistan News, RFE/RL
- Known for: Detained for 34 months by Turkmenistan's government

Saparmämmet Nepesgulyýew is a Turkmenistani freelance journalist who has contributed to Alternative Turkmenistan News, a human rights group based in The Netherlands, and Radio Free Europe/Radio Liberty. Until July 2015, he worked in Turkmenistan reporting on "poverty, official privilege, failing infrastructure, and deficient schools" when he was detained on July 7 at the Awaza resort by agents from the Turkmen National Security Ministry.

On 19 May 2018, Nepesgulyýew was released from prison after having served a sentence on drug charges that human rights groups claim were fabricated in retaliation for his government critical reporting.

== Arrest details ==
According to an interview with one of Nepesgulyýew's former cellmates published on the Broadcasting Board of Governors website, the journalist was in Türkmenbaşy, Turkmenistan, to take pictures of the Awaza resort when he was framed for possession of an illegal drug. When he was out of his hotel taking pictures, he left his luggage at the hotel where Tramadol, a pain medication containing opioids, was placed inside of it. When Nepesgulyýew returned to the hotel and tried to leave, he was met by two agents from the Turkmen National Security Ministry who arrested him.

According to the cellmate, such matters are usually the responsibility of the "Drugs Police" [sic], not the National Security Ministry.

== International reaction ==
Since Saparmämmet's arrest, several NGOs and governmental officials like Human Rights Watch, Dunja Mijatović (the Representative on Freedom of the Media for the Organization for Security and Cooperation in Europe), the Committee to Protect Journalists, John Lansing (the CEO and Director of the Broadcasting Board of Governors), U.S. Congressman Adam Schiff, and the United Nations have called for his release.

On June 30, 2016, thirteen representatives of media and human rights organizations sent a letter to Turkmen President Gurbanguly Berdimuhamedow (as well as other international officials like U.S. Secretary of State John Kerry and the Turkmen foreign minister Rashid Meredov) calling for Nepesgulyýew's release.

== See also ==
- Safety of journalists
