= Sapardurdy Hajyýew =

Turkmenistani human rights activist

- Occupation: human rights activist
- Organization: Turkmenistan Helsinki Foundation
- Known for: 2006 arrest

Sapardurdy Hajyýew is a Turkmen human rights activist who served a prison sentence in Türkmenbaşy from 2006 to 2013. Amnesty International designated him a prisoner of conscience and named him a 2011 "priority case".

== Arrest and trial ==
Sapardurdy Hajyýew is associated with Turkmenistan Helsinki Foundation (THF), an organization that publicized human rights violations in Turkmenistan. In June 2006, he was arrested along with Annagurban Amangylyjow, another THF worker, and Hajyýew's sister Ogulsapar Myradowa, a correspondent for Radio Liberty. The three were initially charged with spying for foreign intelligence services; these charges were later changed to "the illegal acquisition, possession or sale of ammunition or firearms". Amangylyjow's family allege that law enforcement planted cartridges in his car to manufacture evidence. Amnesty International, Front Line, Reporters Without Borders, and Human Rights Watch have all described the charges as fabricated.

== Imprisonment ==
Sapardurdy Hajyýew and Annagurban Amangylyjow were sentenced to seven-year prison terms. Ogulsapar Myradowa was sentenced to six years but died two weeks into her sentence; her children reported that one of her legs was broken, her arms bore evidence of injections, and marks on her body indicated she had been strangled. Reporters Without Borders believes Amangylyjow and Hajyýew to be located in a high-security prison in Türkmenbaşy known for poor conditions: "the region is extremely hot in the summer and bitterly cold in the winter, and inmates are forced to do agricultural work in such conditions... the inmates spend their time in filthy, overcrowded cells with no access to drinking water. The quality of what little food they receive is poor."

On 11 December 2010, the United Nations Working Group on Arbitrary Detention called for the immediate release of Hajyýew and Amangylyjow, stating that their detention was a violation of international law.

Amangylyjow and Hajyýew were released from prison on 16 February 2013, after nearly seven years imprisonment.
