= Annagurban Amangylyjow =

Turkmenistani human rights activist

- Occupation: Human rights activist
- Organization: Turkmenistan Helsinki Foundation
- Known for: 2006 imprisonment

Annagurban Amangylyjow is a human rights activist notable for serving a prison sentence (2006-2013) in the dictatorial regime of Turkmenistan on charges, widely believed to be fabricated. Amnesty International had considered him a prisoner of conscience and named him in 2011 a "priority case".

== Arrest and trial ==
Annagurban Amangylyjow is associated with Turkmenistan Helsinki Foundation (THF), an organization that publicized human rights violations in Turkmenistan. In June 2006, he was arrested along with Sapardurdy Hajyýew, another THF worker, and Hajyýew's sister Ogulsapar Myradowa, a correspondent for Radio Liberty. The three were initially charged with spying for foreign intelligence services; These charges were later changed to "the illegal acquisition, possession or sale of ammunition or firearms." Amangylyjow's family allege that law enforcement planted cartridges in his car to manufacture evidence. Amnesty International, Front Line, Reporters Without Borders, and Human Rights Watch have all described the charges as fabricated.

== Imprisonment ==
Annagurban Amangylyjow and Sapardurdy Hajyýew were sentenced to seven-year prison terms. Ogulsapar Myradowa was sentenced to six years but died two weeks into her sentence; her children reported that one of her legs was broken, her arms bore evidence of injections, and marks on her body indicated she had been strangled. Reporters Without Borders believes Amangylyjow and Hajyýew to be located in a high-security prison in Türkmenbaşy known for poor conditions: "the region is extremely hot in the summer and bitterly cold in the winter, and inmates are forced to do agricultural work in such conditions... the inmates spend their time in filthy, overcrowded cells with no access to drinking water. The quality of what little food they receive is poor."

On 11 December 2010, the United Nations Working Group on Arbitrary Detention called for the immediate release of Amangylyjow and Hajyýew, stating that their detention was a violation of international law.

== Release ==
Amangylyjow and Hajyýew were released from prison on 16 February 2013, after nearly seven years imprisonment.
