= Garabogazköl =

Shallow water-filled depression in the northwestern corner of Turkmenistan

- Garabogaz köli (Turkmen); Garabogaz aýlagy (Turkmen)
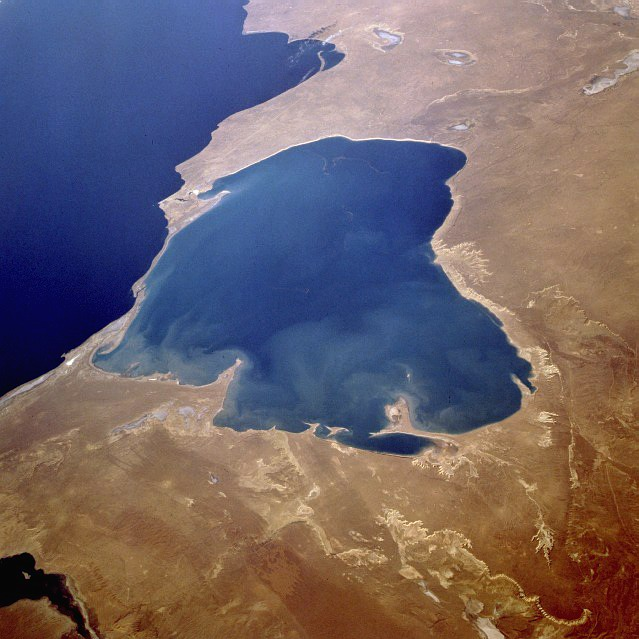
- Garabogazköl from space, September 1995

- Location within Caspian Sea
- Location: Turkmenistan
- Coordinates: 41°21′07″N 53°35′43″E
- Surface area: 18,000 square kilometres (6,900 mi^{2})

Garabogazköl is a shallow, highly saline lagoon off the Caspian Sea in northwestern Turkmenistan. The lagoon has a variable surface area typically about 18,000 km^{2} (6,900 mi^{2}). It is very shallow, with an average depth of 10 meters. It is separated from the Caspian Sea by a narrow, rocky ridge having a very narrow opening through which the Caspian Sea waters flow into it. There is likely a subterranean highly saline water flow when there is less evaporation in winter. The lagoon's volume fluctuates seasonally, accentuated by its salt evaporation ponds and seasonally dry salt pans.

In Turkmen, it is sometimes referred to as a lake ("köl") or a bay ("aýlag"). The city of Garabogaz lies nearby, about 50 km (31 mi) north of the channel between the main Caspian basin and the lagoon.

== Etymology & Toponymy ==
The name was originally applied to the narrow strait which connects the gulf to the Caspian Sea. Because the water in the strait, termed a "throat" (Turkmen: bogaz), was darker than the water on either side, it was termed "dark" or "black" (Turkmen: gara), hence garabogaz. Over time the name was applied to the gulf itself. The water body lends its name to the nearby city of Garabogaz, formerly known as Bekdaş.

In Turkmen, the place is inconsistently named. It is sometimes called "Garabogaz köli," "Lake Garabogaz," or "Garabogaz aýlagy," "Garabogaz Bay." The name "Garabogaz köli" was transcribed into Russian as "Кара-Богаз-Гол," ("Kara-Bogaz-Gol") then transcribed again into Turkmen as "Garabogazköl aýlagy," which is also used nowadays.

== Salinity ==
The salinity of the lagoon is on average about 35%, compared to 1.2% in the Caspian Sea and between 3% and 4% in oceans worldwide. Due to the exceptionally high salinity, comparable to the Dead Sea, it has little to no marine vegetation. Large evaporite deposits consisting mostly of salt on the south shore have been harvested by the local population since the 1920s, but in the 1930s manual collection stopped and the industry shifted northwest to its present center near Garabogaz. From the 1950s onward, groundwater was pumped from levels lower than the bay itself, yielding more valuable types of salts. In 1963, construction began at Garabogaz on a modern plant for increased production of salt products year round, independent of natural evaporation. Construction of the plant was completed in 1973.

In March 1980, workers blocked the Caspian link, due to concerns that evaporation was accelerating a fall in Caspian Sea. The resulting "salt bowl" caused widespread problems of blowing salt, reportedly poisoning the soil and causing health problems for hundreds of kilometers downwind to the east.

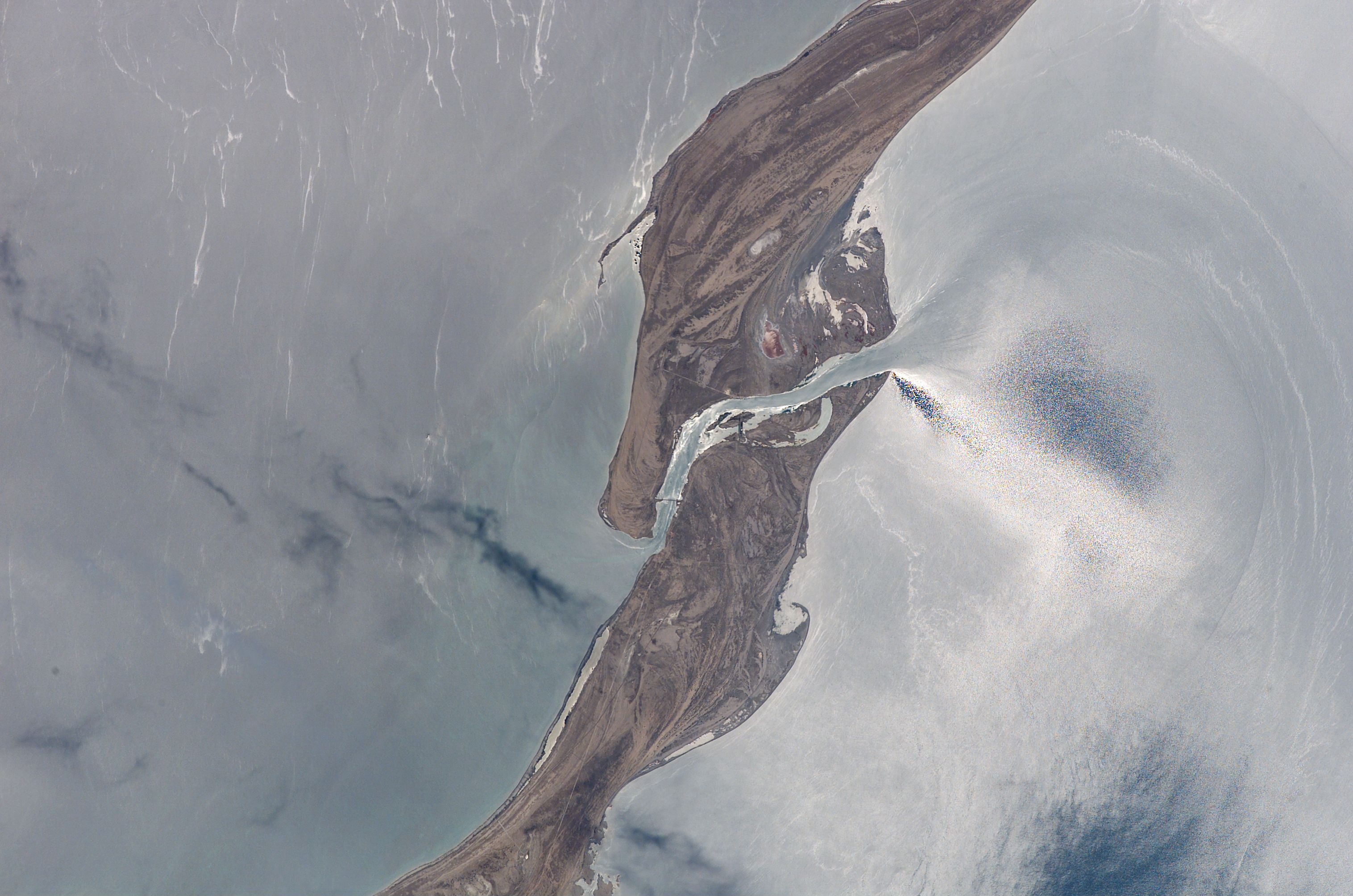
Waters flow through the narrow inlet from the Caspian (left) into the Garabogazköl

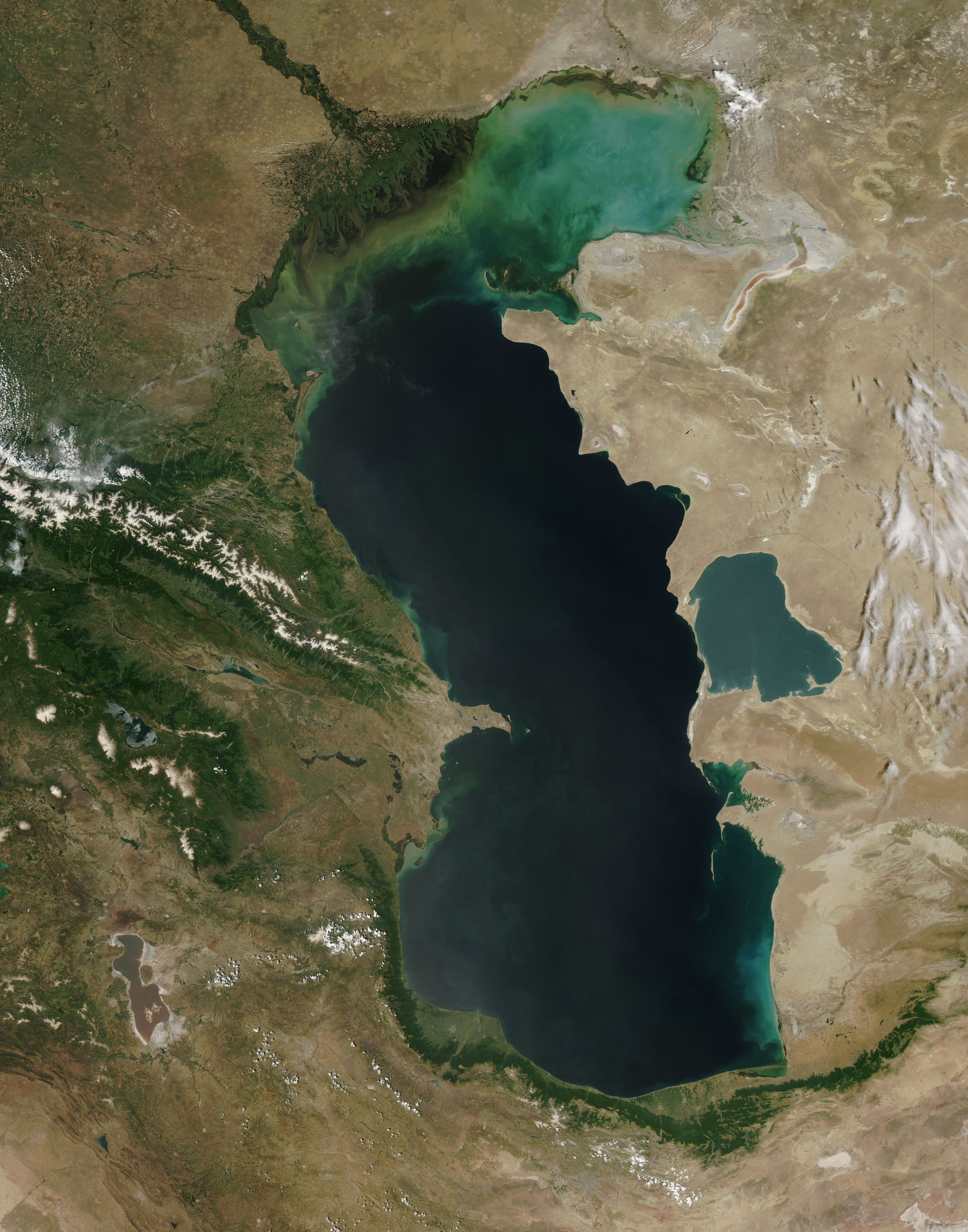
Garabogazköl is visible on the eastern shore of the Caspian Sea

== Complete evaporation ==
In 1984 the lake became completely dry. In June 1992, when Caspian Sea levels rose again, the barrier was removed by order of Turkmen President Saparmyrat Nyýazow, allowing Caspian water to refill the lagoon.

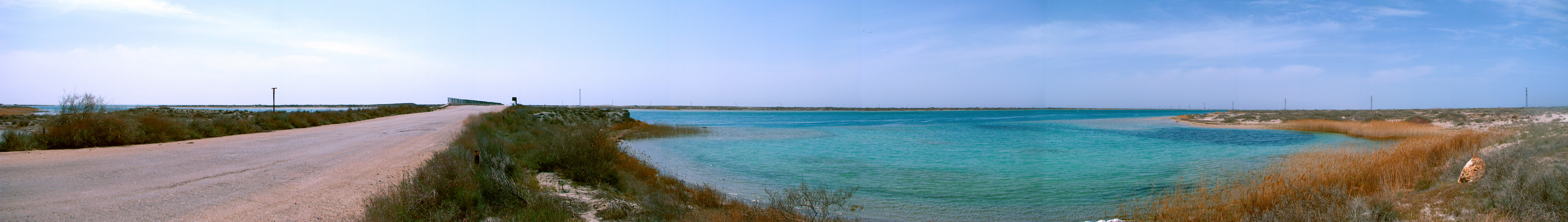
Garabogazköl (right) and a bridge and barrier separating it from the Caspian Sea (left)

== In popular culture ==
The lagoon is the subject of Russian writer Konstantin Paustovsky's 1932 book Kara-Bugaz. In it, he praises the setting up of the local salt industry by the Soviet government in the 1930s.

In 1935, film director Aleksandr Razumny made a film Kara-bugaz (Кара-Бугаз) based on Paustovsky's Kara-Bugaz, with music by Mikhail Ippolitov-Ivanov.

== Automobile bridge ==
The Automobile bridge across Garabogazköl Bay is a major transportation structure located in the Balkan Region of Turkmenistan, built across the strait connecting the bay to the Caspian Sea. The bridge serves as a critical link on the international highway Türkmenbaşy–Garabogaz–Kazakhstan border.

The construction of the new bridge was commissioned to replace the older, two-lane structure that could no longer handle the increasing transport volume. The project was executed by Turkmen builders in collaboration with the Ukrainian company Altkom LLC. The bridge was officially inaugurated on November 2, 2025.

- Total Length: 354 meters
- Width: 21 meters (accommodating four traffic lanes)
- Length of Access Roads: 2000 meters
