= Turkmen Helsinki Foundation for Human Rights =

The Turkmen Helsinki Foundation for Human Rights is a non-governmental organization, based in Bulgaria, for the promotion of human rights in Turkmenistan. The organization was founded on July 21, 2003, in Varna, Bulgaria as a branch of the International Helsinki Federation for Human Rights.

In 2006, THF activists Annagurban Amangylyjow and Sapardurdy Hajyýew were arrested by Turkmenistani security forces on espionage charges, later changed to illegal firearm charges. Amnesty International considers them prisoners of conscience and named them a 2011 "priority case." Front Line, Reporters Without Borders, and Human Rights Watch have all described the charges as fabricated. On 11 December 2010, the United Nations Working Group on Arbitrary Detention also called for their immediate release, stating that their detention was a violation of international law.
