= List of years in Turkmenistan =

This is a list of years in Turkmenistan.

2010s
2010
2011
2012
2013
2014
2015
2016
2017
2018
2019

2020s
2020
2021
2022
2023
2024
2025
2026
2027
2028
2029
