= 2026 in Turkmenistan =

- Decades: 2000s; 2010s; 2020s
- See also: Other events of 2026; Timeline of Turkmen history

This is a list of notable individuals and events related to Turkmenistan in 2026.

== Incumbents ==
Photo	Position	Name
	President of Turkmenistan (since 19 March 2022)	Serdar Berdimuhamedow
	Vice President of Turkmenistan (since 17 February 2007)	Raşit Meredow

== Events ==
=== January ===
- 1 January – Turkmenistan legalizes cryptocurrency mining and exchanges.

== Holidays ==
- 1 January – New Year's Day
- 8 March – International Women's Day
- 20 March – Eid al-Fitr
- 21–22 March – Nowruz
- 18 May – State Flag and Constitution Day
- 27 May – Eid al-Adha
- 27 September – Independence Day
- 6 October – Day of Remembrance
- 12 December – Day of Neutrality

== Deaths ==
- 18 July – Sergei Agashkov, 63, Turkmen-Russian football player (SKA Rostov-on-Don, Torpedo Moscow) and manager (FShM Moscow).
