= 2019 in Turkmenistan =

- Decades: 1990s; 2000s; 2010s; 2020s
- See also: Other events of 2019; Timeline of Turkmen history

Events in the year 2019 in Turkmenistan.

== Incumbents ==
- President: Gurbanguly Berdimuhamedow
- Vice President: Raşit Meredow
- Assembly Speaker: Gülşat Mämmedowa
- Deputy Prime Minister for Foreign Affairs: Rasit Meredow

== Events ==
- Turkmenistan at the 2019 World Aquatics Championships
- Turkmenistan at the 2019 World Athletics Championships
