= 2021 in Turkmenistan =

- Decades: 2000s; 2010s; 2020s
- See also: Other events of 2021; Timeline of Turkmen history

This is a list of notable individuals and events related to Turkmenistan in 2021.

== Incumbents ==
- President: Gurbanguly Berdimuhamedow
- Vice President: Raşit Meredow
- Assembly Speaker: Gülşat Mämmedowa
- Deputy Prime Minister for Foreign Affairs: Rasit Meredow

== Events ==
=== February ===
- 13: Turkmen President Gurbanguly Berdimuhamedov appointed his son, Serdar Berdimuhamedow, deputy prime minister, chairman of the Supreme Control Chamber, and a member of the State Security Council.

=== April ===
- 26: Turkmenistan honors the nation's Alabay breed with a state holiday.

=== May ===
- 25: The 140th anniversary of the city of Ashgabat was celebrated.

=== August ===
- 7: Leaders of five Central Asian countries meet in Avaza to discuss on security issues in the region following recent gains made by Taliban during the crisis in Afghanistan.

== See also ==
- Outline of Turkmenistan
- List of Turkmenistan-related topics
- History of Turkmenistan
