= 2020 in Turkmenistan =

- Decades: 2000s; 2010s; 2020s
- See also: Other events of 2020; Timeline of Turkmen history

Events in the year 2020 in Turkmenistan. Unlike other countries in 2020, Turkmenistan has not significantly been impacted by the COVID-19 pandemic. As of 24 April 2020, Turkmenistan has still not had any reported cases of COVID-19. However, many experts claim that the virus may be spreading in the country unreported, due to the government's control on information about the virus.

== Incumbents ==
- President: Gurbanguly Berdimuhamedow
- Vice President: Raşit Meredow
- Assembly Speaker: Gülşat Mämmedowa
- Deputy Prime Minister for Foreign Affairs: Rasit Meredow

== Events ==
- 31 January – Turkmenistan Airlines announced the suspension of flights to Bangkok and Beijing and took out charter flights of Turkmen citizens there.
- 29 February – Turkmenistan began refusing the entry of citizens from countries affected by the COVID-19 pandemic.
- 5 March – Three foreign travellers, two of them diplomats of an Arab country, were denied entry when they flew from Almaty, Kazakhstan. Their flight was diverted to Türkmenabat and after arriving at Ashgabat, they were all put on a flight to Istanbul.
- 7 April – World Health Day is celebrated.
- 10 April – An extraordinary summit of the Turkic Council is held.
- 19 April – The Football Federation of Turkmenistan resumed.
- 9 May – A military parade and festive celebrations in honor of the 75th anniversary of the victory in World War II was held.
- 2 June – Turkmenistan Futsal League resumes.
