= 2017 in Turkmenistan =

- Decades: 1990s; 2000s; 2010s; 2020s
- See also: Other events of 2017; Timeline of Turkmen history

Events in the year 2017 in Turkmenistan.

== Incumbents ==
- President: Gurbanguly Berdimuhamedow
- Vice President: Raşit Meredow

== Events ==
- 12 February – in the Turkmenistani presidential election, 2017, president Gurbanguly Berdymukhamedov was re-elected, winning about 97% of the votes.
- 21 May – Two parliamentary by-elections are held.
- 17-27 September – scheduled date for the 2017 Asian Indoor and Martial Arts Games, to be hosted in Ashgabat
