= 2018 in Turkmenistan =

- Decades: 1990s; 2000s; 2010s; 2020s
- See also: Other events of 2018; Timeline of Turkmen history

Events in the year 2018 in Turkmenistan.

== Incumbents ==
- President: Gurbanguly Berdimuhamedow
- Vice President: Raşit Meredow

== Events ==
- 25 March – Turkmen parliamentary election, 2018

== Deaths ==
- 3 January – Medeniyet Shahberdiyeva, opera singer (b. 1930)
- 27 April – Maya Kuliyeva, operatic soprano and actress (b. 1920)
