= 2018 Turkmen parliamentary election =

- 25 March 2018
- All 125 seats in the Assembly; 63 seats needed for a majority
- Turnout: 91.69%
Party	Leader	Seats	+/–
TDP	Kasymguly Babaev	55	+8
TSTP	Saparmyrat Owganow	11	−3
TAP	Rejep Bazarow	11	New
Independents	–	48	+41
This lists parties that won seats. See the complete results below.
Chair of the Assembly before	Chair of the Assembly after
Akja Nurberdiýewa; TDP	Gülşat Mämmedowa; Independent

Parliamentary elections were held in Turkmenistan on 25 March 2018, alongside local elections.

== Electoral system ==
The 125 members of the Assembly were elected in single-member constituencies by first-past-the-post voting. A turnout of at least 50% of registered voters is required to validate the result in a constituency, forcing a repeat of the election in it if not attained.

== Campaign ==
A total of 284 candidates contested the elections; 117 from the Democratic Party, 28 from the Agrarian Party, 23 from the Party of Industrialists and Entrepreneurs and 116 as independents.

== Conduct ==
The 2018 OSCE election observer mission noted,

The 25 March elections lacked important prerequisites of a genuinely democratic electoral process. The political environment is only nominally pluralist and does not offer voters political alternatives. Exercise of fundamental freedoms is severely curtailed, inhibiting free expression of the voters’ will. Despite measures to demonstrate transparency, the integrity of elections was not ensured, leaving veracity of results in doubt.

== Results ==
Party	Votes	%	Seats	+/–
Democratic Party of Turkmenistan			55	+8
Party of Industrialists and Entrepreneurs			11	–3
Agrarian Party of Turkmenistan			11	New
Independents			48	+41
Total			125	0
Total votes	3,017,801	–		
Registered voters/turnout	3,291,312	91.69		
Source: CEC, IPU
