= 2022 in Turkmenistan =

- Decades: 2000s; 2010s; 2020s
- See also: Other events of 2022; Timeline of Turkmen history

This is a list of notable individuals and events related to Turkmenistan in 2022.

== Incumbents ==
Photo	Position	Name
	President of Turkmenistan (until 19 March 2022)	Gurbanguly Berdimuhamedow
	President of Turkmenistan (since 19 March 2022)	Serdar Berdimuhamedow
	Vice President of Turkmenistan (since 17 February 2007)	Raşit Meredow

== Events ==
- 12 March – 2022 Turkmenistan presidential election: A presidential election is held in Turkmenistan, with Serdar Berdimuhamedow expecting to be elected President of Turkmenistan to succeed his father, Gurbanguly Berdimuhamedow.
- 15 March – Serdar Berdimuhamedow is elected President of Turkmenistan, succeeding his father Gurbanguly Berdimuhamedow.
- 19 March – Serdar Berdimuhamedow is sworn in as President of Turkmenistan.
- 26 June – Russian President Vladimir Putin embarks on a foreign trip to Tajikistan and Turkmenistan, his first since the Russian invasion of Ukraine.

== Sports ==
- 9 – 18 August: Turkmenistan at the 2021 Islamic Solidarity Games
- 17 June – 13 July: Turkmenistan at the 2022 World Aquatics Championships

== See also ==
- Outline of Turkmenistan
- List of Turkmenistan-related topics
- History of Turkmenistan
