= Elections in Turkmenistan =

Turkmenistan elects on national level a head of state — the president — and a legislature. The elections in Turkmenistan since its split from the Soviet Union have been widely criticized for being neither free nor fair and attempting to give an appearance of legitimacy to what is in reality a dictatorship. The parties of Turkmenistan are the Democratic Party of Turkmenistan, the Agrarian Party of Turkmenistan, and the Party of Industrialists and Entrepreneurs. The president has a seven-year term, while the legislature has a five-year term.

== Presidential elections ==
After declaring independence from the Soviet Union, the president was set to be elected for a five-year term by the people. President Saparmurat Niyazov, was elected unopposed on 21 June 1992. In a referendum in January 1994, it was decided that he would be president for eight more years. In 1999, the country's parliament named him president for life. He died on 21 December 2006. An election to replace him was held on 11 February 2007, which was won by ruling party candidate Gurbanguly Berdimuhamedow.

== Legislative elections ==
Turkmenistan elects a legislature on a national level. The Assembly (Mejlis) has 125 members, elected for a five-year term in single seat constituencies. Political parties are the Democratic Party of Turkmenistan (TDP), the Agrarian Party of Turkmenistan (TAP) and the Party of Industrialists and Entrepreneurs (TSwTP). Prior to 2008, Turkmenistan was a one-party state under the TDP. The Halk Maslahaty (People's Council) which is considered the ultimate representative body, has more than 2,500 members; it was abolished in late 2008. All legal parties currently support the government.

== Latest elections ==
=== Presidential election ===
The Central Election Committee reported on 15 March that Serdar Berdimuhamedow won the election with 72.97% of the vote. University official Hydyr Nunnaýew came in second place with 11.09%. Unlike in prior elections, the preliminary results were not available on the day after the election. Berdimuhamedow received the lowest number of votes out of any winning candidate in all Turkmen presidential elections. Turnout was reported at 97% according to the Central Election Committee.

Candidate	Party	Votes	%
Serdar Berdimuhamedow	Democratic Party of Turkmenistan	2,452,705	72.97
Hydyr Nunnaýew	Independent	372,525	11.08
Agajan Bekmyradow	Agrarian Party of Turkmenistan	242,685	7.22
Berdimämmet Gurbanow	Independent	74,690	2.22
Perhat Begenjow	Democratic Party of Turkmenistan	67,770	2.02
Maksatmyrat Öwezgeldiýew	Independent	38,881	1.16
Maksat Ödeşow	Democratic Party of Turkmenistan	38,801	1.15
Kakageldi Saryýew	Independent	36,568	1.09
Babamyrat Meredow	Party of Industrialists and Entrepreneurs of Turkmenistan	36,412	1.08
Total		3,361,037	100.00
Valid votes		3,361,037	99.97
Invalid/blank votes		1,015	0.03
Total votes		3,362,052	100.00
Registered voters/turnout		3,460,080	97.17
Source: Watan

=== Assembly election ===
Party	Votes	%	Seats	+/–
Democratic Party of Turkmenistan			65	+10
Agrarian Party of Turkmenistan			24	+13
Party of Industrialists and Entrepreneurs			18	+7
Independents			18	–30
Total			125	0
Total votes	3,185,935	–		
Registered voters/turnout	3,496,304	91.12		
Source: CEC (turnout), Turkmen Portal (seat distribution)

=== People's Council election ===
Ballots were counted, and results declared the next morning. The following candidates were elected: (Note: Patronyms are not mentioned.)

Successful candidates in the 2021 Turkmen People's Council election
Ahal Province	Balkan Province	Dasoguz Province	Lebap Province	Mary Province	Ashgabat City
Enejan Ataýewa (Note: Female candidate)	Annatagan Amanow	Ýazdurdy Altybaýew	Ahmed Bekiýew	Orazdurdy Abdyýew	Mähri Bäşimowa
Gurbanguly Berdimuhamedow	Araz Arazow	Ýazmämmet Ataýew	Begenç Çaryýew	Maksat Atajanow	Nazar Çöliýew
Döwletgeldi Çaryýew	Maral Ataklyçewa	Babajyk Babajykow	Babamurat Halow	Gurbanmyrat Ataýew	Muhammetnazar Geldiýew
Ogulmaral Hojaýewa	Döwletgeldi Gazakow	Amangylyç Golbaýew	Bähbit Pigamow	Batyr Gylyçdurdyýew	Jeýhun Igdirow
Seýdi Jumaýew	Wepaberdi Goýunlyýew	Ýeňiş Haýytjanow	Gülnaz Rejepowa	Halymberdi Hajyýew	Bazar Muhammetgulyýew
Hydyrmuhammet Orazmämmedow	Süleýman Gylyçjanow	Abdulla Kakaýew	Umida Saparowa	Ogulgerek Hydyrowa	Baýramgözel Myradowa
Aýgözel Öwezowa	Äşe Hanalyýewa	Atageldi Musaýew	Bahar Seýidowa	Merdan Kömekow	Döwletmyrat Myratgulyýew
Eşret Täşliýew	Täzegül Nyýazowa	Akmyrat Taganow	Magtym Ýangibaýew	Parahat Şamyradow	Aýgözel Nurlyýewa

Twenty-seven percent of the winning candidates were women. Berdimuhamedow was alleged to have received 100% of the vote.

== See also ==
- Electoral calendar
- Electoral system
