= 2023 in Turkmenistan =

- Decades: 2000s; 2010s; 2020s
- See also: Other events of 2023; Timeline of Turkmen history

This is a list of notable individuals and events related to Turkmenistan in 2023.

== Incumbents ==
Photo	Position	Name
	President of Turkmenistan (since 19 March 2022)	Serdar Berdimuhamedow
	Vice President of Turkmenistan (since 17 February 2007)	Raşit Meredow

== Events ==
- 26 March – 2023 Turkmen parliamentary election

== Deaths ==
- 6 January – Omar Berdiýew, 43, footballer (Esil Bogatyr, Dinamo Samarqand, national team).

== See also ==
- Outline of Turkmenistan
- List of Turkmenistan-related topics
- History of Turkmenistan
