= List of chairmen of the Supreme Soviet of the Turkmen Soviet Socialist Republic =

The chairman of the Supreme Soviet of the Turkmen Soviet Socialist Republic (from October 25, 1990: Republic of Turkmenistan) was the parliamentary speaker of the legislature, which was succeeded by the Majlis in 1992. From 1938 to 1990, the chairman of the Supreme Soviet was the republic's de jure head of state.

| Name | Period |
|---|---|
| Alla Berdy Berdyev | July 24, 1938 – January 27, 1942 |
| Kurban Permanov | January 27, 1942 – 1945 |
| Shadzha Batyrov | March 1947 – March 4, 1948 |
| Yusup Ovezov | March 4, 1948 – ? |
| T. Atayev | 1956 – March 30, 1959 |
| Shamurad Tashliyev | March 30, 1959 – March 26, 1963 |
| Makthum Shabasanov | March 26, 1963 – April 1967 |
| Pygam Azimov | April 1967 – June 29, 1971 |
| Davly Karayev | June 29, 1971 – 1973 |
| Bally Yazkuliyev | 1973 – December 17, 1975 |
| Aman Durdiyev | December 17, 1975 – March 21, 1980 |
| Orazgeldy Ovezgeldyev | March 21, 1980 – January 18, 1990 |
| Saparmurat Niyazov | January 18, 1990 – November 2, 1990 |
| Sakhat Muradov | November 18, 1990 – 1995 |
