= National Council of Turkmenistan =

Legislature of Turkmenistan (2021–2023)

National Council of Turkmenistan Türkmenistanyň Milli Geňeşi (Turkmen)
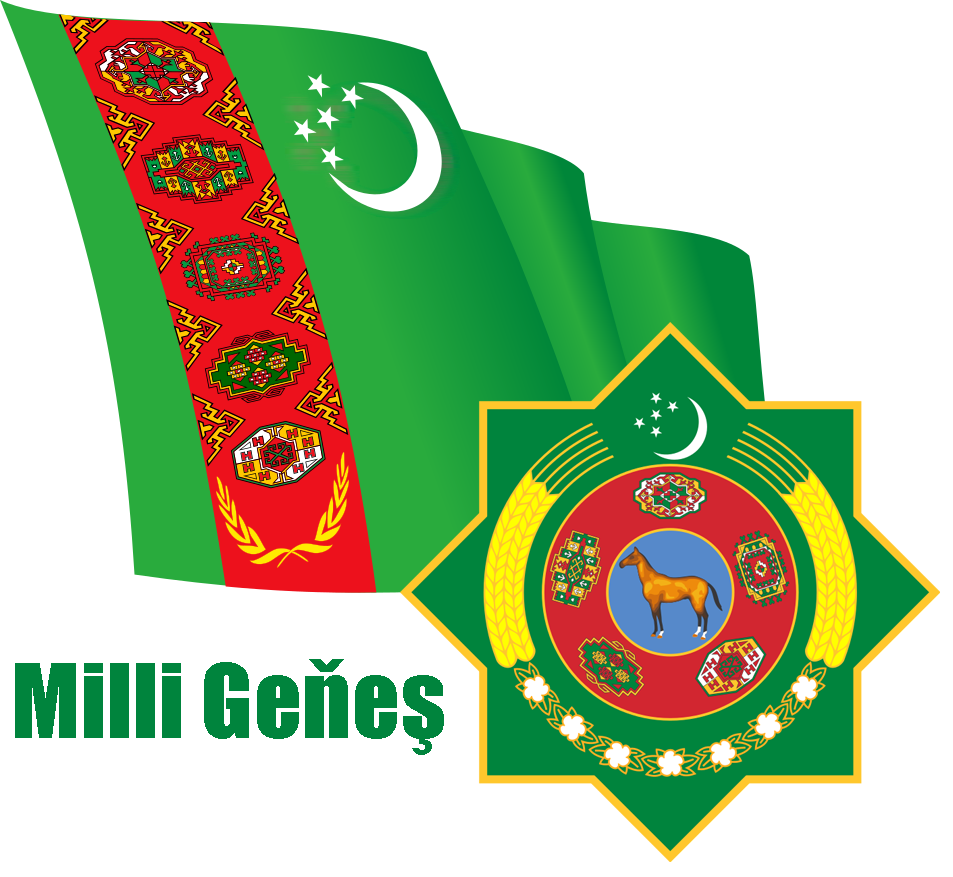

Type
- Type: Bicameral
- Houses: Upper: Halk Maslahaty; Lower: Mejlis

History
- Founded: 24 October 2020 (created); 1 January 2021 (start of work)
- Disbanded: 21 January 2023
- Preceded by: Unicameral Mejlis of Turkmenistan, 1992–2020
- Succeeded by: Unicameral Mejlis of Turkmenistan, 21 January 2023

Leadership
- Chairman of Halk Maslahaty: Gurbanguly Berdimuhamedow (Independent), since 30 November 2007
- Chairman of Mejlis: Dünýägözel Gulmanowa (DPT), since 6 April 2023

Structure
- Seats: 181: 56 senators in Halk Maslahaty; 125 deputies in Mejlis
- Halk Maslahaty political groups: Independents (45); Appointed by the President (8); Democratic Party (3)
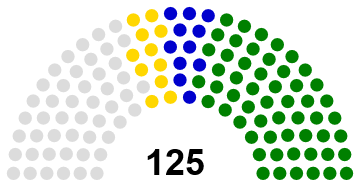
- Mejlis political groups: Government (107): Democratic Party (65); Agrarian Party (24); Party of Industrialists and Entrepreneurs (18); Supported by (18): Independents (18); Opposition (0)

Elections
- Halk Maslahaty voting system: 48 seats were elected by secret ballot by the members of the regional branches of the Halk Maslahaty; 8 seats were appointed by the President
- Mejlis voting system: Plurality voting
- Last Halk Maslahaty election: 28 March 2021
- Last Mejlis election: 26 March 2023
- Next Halk Maslahaty election: March 2026
- Next Mejlis election: March 2028

Meeting place
- People's Council Building
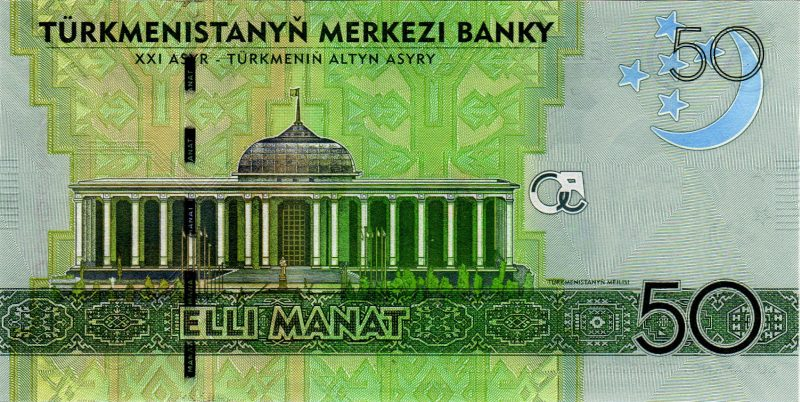
- Assembly Building

The National Council of Turkmenistan (Turkmen: Türkmenistanyň Milli Geňeşi) was Turkmenistan's bicameral national legislative body or parliament from March 2021 until January 2023. The upper chamber was the People's Council (Halk Maslahaty) and the lower chamber was the Assembly (Mejlis). The National Council was created in March 2021 following election of members to the upper chamber, which in turn followed a constitutional amendment in late 2020.

In January 2023 both chambers of parliament proposed to abolish the Halk Maslahaty as a legislative organ, to reform it as an independent body, and to place all legislative authority with a unicameral Mejlis. The National Council was accordingly abolished by unanimous vote of its members in a joint session of the People's Council and Assembly on 21 January 2023.

== See also ==
- Assembly of Turkmenistan
- People's Council of Turkmenistan
- Politics of Turkmenistan
