= 2012 in Turkmenistan =

- Decades: 1990s; 2000s; 2010s; 2020s
- See also: Other events of 2012; Timeline of Turkmen history

The following lists events that happened during 2012 in Turkmenistan.

== Incumbents ==
- President: Gurbanguly Berdimuhamedow
- Vice President: Raşit Meredow

== Events ==
=== February ===
- February 12 - Turkmenistan has a presidential election; incumbent Gurbanguly Berdimuhamedow is re-elected with 97% of the vote.
- February 13 - The President of Turkmenistan, Gurbanguli Berdymukhamedov, wins a new five-year term with 97% of the vote, according to election officials.

=== December ===
- December 15 - A census of population and housing begins today.
