= 2023 Turkmen parliamentary election =

- 26 March 2023
- All 125 seats in the Assembly; 63 seats needed for a majority
- Turnout: 91.12%
Party	Leader	Seats	+/–
TDP	Ata Serdarow	65	+10
TSTP	Saparmyrat Owganow	18	+7
TAP	Rejep Bazarow	24	+13
Independents	–	18	−30
This lists parties that won seats. See the complete results below.
Chair of the Assembly before	Chair of the Assembly after
Gülşat Mämmedowa; TDP	Dünýägözel Gulmanowa; TDP

Parliamentary elections were held in Turkmenistan on 26 March 2023 to elect the 125 members of the Assembly. The elections took place after the introduction of a separate constitutional authority. The Assembly (Turkmen: Mejlis) is since January 2023 the unicameral legislature of Turkmenistan. Between March 2021 and 21 January 2023 it was the lower house of the National Council of Turkmenistan.

No prior elections in Turkmenistan have been deemed free and fair.

== Results ==
Party	Votes	%	Seats	+/–
Democratic Party of Turkmenistan			65	+10
Agrarian Party of Turkmenistan			24	+13
Party of Industrialists and Entrepreneurs			18	+7
Independents			18	–30
Total			125	0
Total votes	3,185,935	–		
Registered voters/turnout	3,496,304	91.12		
Source: CEC (turnout), Turkmen Portal (seat distribution)
