= 2025 in Turkmenistan =

- Decades: 2000s; 2010s; 2020s
- See also: Other events of 2025; Timeline of Turkmen history

This is a list of notable individuals and events related to Turkmenistan in 2025.

== Incumbents ==
Photo	Position	Name
	President of Turkmenistan (since 19 March 2022)	Serdar Berdimuhamedow
	Vice President of Turkmenistan (since 17 February 2007)	Raşit Meredow

== Events ==
=== February ===
- 11 February – Turkmenistan reaches an agreement to export natural gas to Turkey via Iran.

=== April ===
- 18 April – President Berdimuhamedow signs a law allowing for the issuance of electronic visas to foreign nationals visiting the country.

=== June ===
- 4 June – US President Donald Trump issues a proclamation imposing partial restrictions on Turkmen nationals travelling to the United States.

=== July ===
- 30 July – Three Turkmen citizens are deported from Russia’s Saratov Oblast for migration violations under new fast-track expulsion rules.

=== December ===
- 16 December – US President Donald Trump issues a proclamation lifting a ban on the issuance of non-immigrant visas to Turkmen nationals travelling to the United States.

== Holidays ==
- 1 January – New Year's Day
- 8 March – International Women's Day
- 21–22 March – Nowruz
- 31 March – Eid al-Fitr
- 18 May – State Flag and Constitution Day
- 7 June – Dhu al-Hijja
- 27 September – Independence Day
- 6 October – Day of Remembrance
- 12 December – Day of Neutrality
