= Ovezmammed Mammedov =

Member of the Assembly of Turkmenistan
- Incumbent
- Assumed office 10 June 2013
- Constituency: Lebap Province

1st Chairman of the Party of Industrialists and Entrepreneurs of Turkmenistan
- In office 21 August 2012 – December 2017
- Preceded by: office established
- Succeeded by: Saparmurat Ovganov

Personal details
- Party: Party of Industrialists and Entrepreneurs of Turkmenistan

Ovezmammed Mammedov is a Turkmen politician. From 21 August 2012 until December 2017 he served as the leader of Party of Industrialists and Entrepreneurs of Turkmenistan - the second legal party in Turkmenistan.

In June 2013 he was elected to the Assembly of Turkmenistan from Lebap Province constituency. He is the first member of the Turkmen parliament not to belong to the Democratic Party of Turkmenistan.
