= 2024 in Turkmenistan =

- Decades: 2000s; 2010s; 2020s
- See also: Other events of 2024; Timeline of Turkmen history

This is a list of notable individuals and events related to Turkmenistan in 2024.

== Incumbents ==
Photo	Position	Name
	President of Turkmenistan (since 19 March 2022)	Serdar Berdimuhamedow
	Vice President of Turkmenistan (since 17 February 2007)	Raşit Meredow

== Events ==
- July 3 – Turkmenistan's foreign ministry announces an agreement with Iran to build a 125-kilometer pipeline that would deliver 10 billion cubic meters of natural gas to Iraq annually.

== Holidays ==
- 1 January - New Year's Day
- 8 March - International Women's Day
- 21–23 March - Nowruz
- 10 April – Eid al-Fitr
- 18 May - State Flag and Constitution Day
- 16 June – Dhu al-Hijja
- 27 September – Independence Day
- 6 October – Day of Remembrance
- 12 December – Day of Neutrality
