= 2021 Turkmen People's Council election =

People's Council elections were held in Turkmenistan on 28 March 2021 to elect 48 of the 56 members of the People's Council or Halk Maslahaty. Another eight were appointed by the president on 14 April 2021.

== Background ==
No election held since the country's independence from the Soviet Union has been judged to be free or fair, and international media often refer to Turkmenistan as an autocracy with a rubber-stamp parliament.

Following constitutional amendments in September 2020, the unicameral 125-seat Assembly was replaced by the bicameral National Council (Milli Geňeş) with the Assembly (Mejlis) becoming the lower house and the 56-seat People's Council (Halk Maslahaty) becoming the upper house. Foreign policy analysts linked the changes with President Berdimuhamedow smoothening avenues for an upcoming transfer of power to his son.

== Electoral system ==
Councils of the five provinces (welaýat) and the capital city (şäher) nominated eight members each, while the remaining eight members were to be appointed by the president. To be nominated as a member, one had to be a citizen of Turkmenistan above 30 years of age with a minimum educational qualification of graduation and have permanent residence status for the previous ten years, with no active criminal proceedings. (Note: The Election Commission website adds that a candidate must be "patriotic". This is an extra-constitutional addition.)

The 15-member Central Election Commission—established in 2019 by a presidential decree as an "independent organ of the state"—was tasked with overseeing the entire process, with aid from provincial election commissions.

== Candidates ==
Nominations ran from 6 February to 2 March. (Note: According to Turkmen law, nominations open 50 days prior to the election and run for 25 days.) 112 candidates—21 from Ahal province, 21 from Balkan province, 18 from Dashoguz province, 18 from Lebap province, 17 from Mary Province, and 17 from Ashgabat—entered the race. 83 were men and 29 women.

Biographic sketches of all candidates were broadcast in Turkmen mass media by the first week of March. (Note: However, as has been standard practice in Turkmenistan, the details provided were extremely scanty. The lone missing entry (3 March) was that of President Berdimuhamedow.) Most were civil servants. Campaigning was permitted until 26 March.

== Conduct ==
Each province (and the capital) was assigned a single voting center. Polling was open from 09:00 (Note: 9:00 is claimed by the Election Commission. The State News Agency of Turkmenistan (TDH) claimed that polling began at 10:00 with the singing of state anthem.) to 23:00 on 28 March; the entrance area was livestreamed on the website of the Election Commission for the entire duration.

Candidates were styled as "Family name, First name, Patronymic" (Note: See Eastern Slavic naming customs for details.), and sorted alphabetically in the ballot; age, occupation, place of residence, and place of work were also mentioned. Out of the 231 councillors, who registered as voters, 228 took part. (Note: A counsellor each skipped from the provinces of Akhal and Balkan, and the capital city of Ashgabat.)

=== Observers ===
The Election Commission claimed to have appointed 440 observers—420 from the six approved political parties, 20 from civil society organizations, and 20 candidate-proxies—for "increasing transparency" of the election. Foreign observers were not allowed.

== Results ==
Ballots were counted, and results declared the next morning. The following candidates were elected: (Note: Patronyms are not mentioned.)

Successful candidates in the 2021 Turkmen People's Council election
Ahal Province	Balkan Province	Dasoguz Province	Lebap Province	Mary Province	Ashgabat City
Enejan Ataýewa (Note: Female candidate)	Annatagan Amanow	Ýazdurdy Altybaýew	Ahmed Bekiýew	Orazdurdy Abdyýew	Mähri Bäşimowa
Gurbanguly Berdimuhamedow	Araz Arazow	Ýazmämmet Ataýew	Begenç Çaryýew	Maksat Atajanow	Nazar Çöliýew
Döwletgeldi Çaryýew	Maral Ataklyçewa	Babajyk Babajykow	Babamurat Halow	Gurbanmyrat Ataýew	Muhammetnazar Geldiýew
Ogulmaral Hojaýewa	Döwletgeldi Gazakow	Amangylyç Golbaýew	Bähbit Pigamow	Batyr Gylyçdurdyýew	Jeýhun Igdirow
Seýdi Jumaýew	Wepaberdi Goýunlyýew	Ýeňiş Haýytjanow	Gülnaz Rejepowa	Halymberdi Hajyýew	Bazar Muhammetgulyýew
Hydyrmuhammet Orazmämmedow	Süleýman Gylyçjanow	Abdulla Kakaýew	Umida Saparowa	Ogulgerek Hydyrowa	Baýramgözel Myradowa
Aýgözel Öwezowa	Äşe Hanalyýewa	Atageldi Musaýew	Bahar Seýidowa	Merdan Kömekow	Döwletmyrat Myratgulyýew
Eşret Täşliýew	Täzegül Nyýazowa	Akmyrat Taganow	Magtym Ýangibaýew	Parahat Şamyradow	Aýgözel Nurlyýewa

Twenty-seven percent of the winning candidates were women. Berdimuhamedow was alleged to have received 100% of the vote.

== Aftermath ==
On 14 April 2021, the People's Council held its first session. Berdimuhamedow inaugurated the complex, addressed the winners, and went on to appoint eight more members. (Note: The eight appointees were: Agaýew Guwançmyrat Bagybekowiç, Babanyýazow Çarygeldi Gurbangeldiýewiç, Babaýew Kasymguly Gulmyradowiç, Gaýypow Serdar Aşyrowiç, Gulmanowa Dünýägözel Akmuhammedowna, Halnazarow Merdan Jowmardowiç, Orazmämmedow Batyr Geldymämmedowiç, and Taganow Merettagan Gurbandurdyýewiç.) Thereafter, the Council Chair and Deputy Chair were elected. Also elected were the Chairs and Deputy Chairs of five House Committees.

== See also ==
- Assembly of Turkmenistan
- National Council of Turkmenistan
- People's Council of Turkmenistan
- Politics of Turkmenistan
