= Dünýägözel Gulmanowa =

Turkmen politician (born 1989)

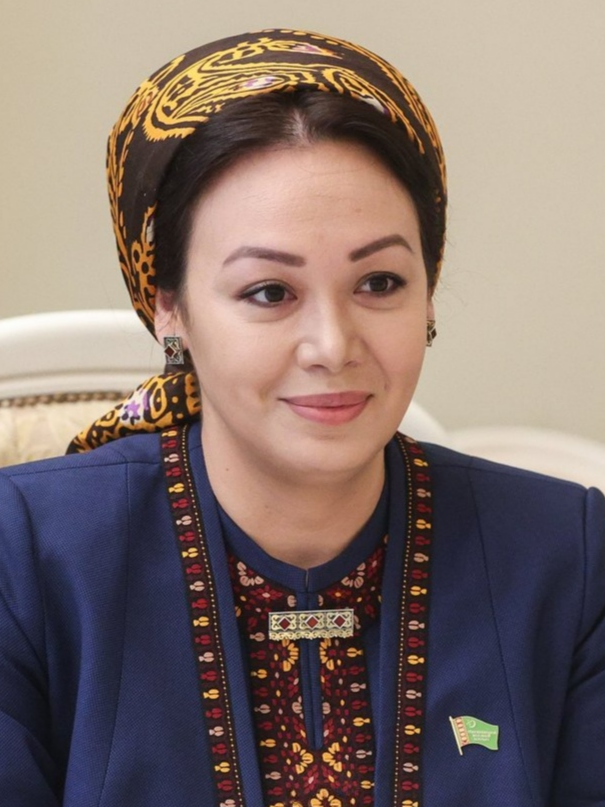
- Gulmanowa in 2023

8th Chairperson of the Assembly of Turkmenistan
- Incumbent
- Assumed office 6 April 2023
- President: Serdar Berdimuhamedow
- Preceded by: Gülşat Mämmedowa

Member of the Assembly of Turkmenistan
- Incumbent
- Assumed office 26 March 2023
- Constituency: Ashgabat 5th District

Personal details
- Born: Dünýägözel Akmuhammedowna Gulmanowa; January 14, 1989 (age 37) Ashkhabad, Turkmen SSR, Soviet Union
- Party: Democratic Party of Turkmenistan
- Children: 2
- Education: Turkmen State University
- Occupation: lawyer, politician

Dünýägözel Akmuhammedowna Gulmanowa (born 14 January 1989) is a Turkmen politician currently serving as speaker of Turkmenistan's parliament.

== Biography ==
Gulmanowa was born on 14 January 1989 in Ashgabat. From 1995 to 2004, she studied at Specialized Secondary School No. 27 in Ashgabat. From 2004 to 2006, she was a tenant farmer of Bagyr Farmers Association in the former Bagyr village of Ahal Region. From 2006 to 2007, she worked as a junior medical officer at the former Ruhabat District Hospital of Ahal Province.

In 2007 she enrolled to Turkmen State University, and graduated in 2012 with a degree in law. From 2012 to 2014, she worked as a chief consultant of the Legal Information Centre and the Constitutional Law Department of the Legislation Department of the Ministry of Justice. From 2014 to 2015, she worked as a chief consultant of the Department of Human Resources and Control of Executive Discipline of the Ministry of Justice. From 2015 to 2016 she worked as a state notary intern for the Ashgabat Municipal State Notary Office. From 2016 to 2018 Gulmanowa worked in several functions in the Ministry of Justice and Ashgabat city administration. From 2018 to 2021, Gulmanowa worked as a chief consultant of the division of economic legislation and state registration of regulations of the Legislation Department of the Ministry of Justice.

On 14 April 2021, Gulmanova was appointed to the People's Council of Turkmenistan by presidential decree. From 2021 to 2023, she served as deputy chairman and then Chairman of the Committee for Protection of Human Rights and Freedoms of the People's Council of Turkmenistan. Beginning in January 2023 she became a senior consultant in the Department of Notaries and Registration of Acts of Civil Status of the Department of Legal Aid of the Ministry of Justice.

In March 2023 she stood for election to the Turkmen parliament (Turkmen: Mejlis) from the 5th parliamentary district of Ashgabat. On 6 April 2023 she was unanimously elected speaker of parliament.

== Personal life ==
Gulmanowa is married and has two children. She is a member of the Democratic Party of Turkmenistan.
