= Viktor Rebryk =

Russian politician (1942–2026)

- Виктор Ребрик

Member of the Supreme Soviet of the Turkmen SSR
- In office 1975–1994

Personal details
- Born: Viktor Nikolaevich Rebryk; 31 August 1942 Menzelinsk, Tatar ASSR, Russian SFSR, Soviet Union
- Died: 19 February 2026 (aged 83) Moscow, Russia
- Party: CPSU
- Education: Academy of Social Sciences at the Central Committee of the CPSU
- Occupation: Economist

Viktor Nikolaevich Rebryk (Russian: Виктор Николаевич Ребрик; 31 August 1942 – 19 February 2026) was a Russian politician. A member of the Communist Party of the Soviet Union, he served in the Supreme Soviet of the Turkmen SSR from 1975 to 1994.

Rebryk died in Moscow on 19 February 2026, at the age of 83.
