= Sakhat Muradov =

Turkmen politician (1932–2011)

Chairman of the Assembly of Turkmenistan
- In office 1995 – 7 May 2001
- Succeeded by: Raşit Meredow

Chairman of the Supreme Soviet of the Turkmen Soviet Socialist Republic
- In office 1990–1992
- Preceded by: Saparmurat Niyazov
- Succeeded by: Office abolished

Personal details
- Born: 7 May 1932 Ivanovo, Soviet Union
- Died: 29 October 2011 (aged 79) Ashgabat, Turkmenistan
- Party: CPSU

Sakhat Nepesowiç Muradov (Russian: Сахат Непесович Мурадов; 7 May 1932 – 29 October 2011) was a Turkmen politician who served as the Chairman of the Assembly of Turkmenistan from 1995 to 2001. He was also served as Chairman of the Supreme Soviet of the Turkmen Soviet Socialist Republic from 1990 to 1992.

== Biography ==
Muradov was born on 7 May 1932 in Ivanovo, to a member of the Turkmen Teke tribe. He attended the Turkmen Agricultural Institute where he studied hydraulic engineering and graduated in 1956, later undergoing postgraduate study until 1960. He had joined the Communist Party of the Soviet Union in 1951 and began working as a secretary for the Komsomol of Ukraine committee at the Agricultural Institute in 1951. Muradov served as chairman for the TSHI trade union committee from 1956 to 1957 while working as a senior laboratory assistant there. He was a postgraduate student at the Institute of Anti-Earthquake Engineering from 1957 to 1960 and became a Doctor of Technical Sciences in 1960.

Muradov became an agronomist and worked as a surveyor and hydraulic engineer. From 1960 to 1964, he worked as a junior researcher for the Institute of Earthquake Engineering of the Academy of Sciences of the TSSR and as the departmental head of the Research Institute of Water Problems and Hydraulic Engineering. He then served as deputy chairman of the Council for Coordination of Scientific Activity of the Academy of Sciences of the TSSR from 1964 to 1965. In 1965, he became head of the department of science of educational institutions of the apparatus of the Central Committee of the Communist Party of Turkmenistan.

Muradov, a professor and author of three books, served as rector of Turkmen State University from 1970 to 1979 and then served as the TSSR Minister of Higher and Secondary Specialized Education from 1979 to 1985. He was rector of the Turkmen Polytechnic Institute from 1985 to 1990. In May 1990, he became a member of the Central Committee of the Communist Party of Turkmenistan, then became a member of the Bureau of the Central Committee in April 1991. Muradov was elected to the Supreme Soviet of the Turkmen Soviet Socialist Republic in January 1990 and was then named first deputy chairman of the council.

Later in 1990, Muradov became the Chairman of the Supreme Soviet, succeeding Saparmurat Niyazov. The Supreme Soviet was later succeeded by the Assembly of Turkmenistan (Mejlis) and Muradov became the Chairman of the Assembly of Turkmenistan in 1995. He retired from his position in May 2001, writing a letter of gratitude "for his contribution to the formation of parliament and long-term state activity". He twice received the Order of the Red Banner of Labour and was given the honorary title of "Honored Worker of Higher Education of Turkmenistan". Muradov, who was married, died on 29 October 2011 in Ashgabat, at the age of 79. In 2016, he posthumously received the Medal "For Love of the Fatherland" from President Gurbanguly Berdimuhamedow for his "great success in strengthening the independence and sovereignty of Turkmenistan".
