= Ata Çaryýew =

Turkmen politician

Deputy Chairman of the Cabinet of Ministers
- In office January 1992 – June 1992
- President: Saparmurat Niyazov
- Preceded by: New position
- Succeeded by: Orazgeldi Aýdogdiýew

Personal details
- Born: 1932 (age 93–94)

Ata Çaryýew (Cyrillic: Ата Чарыев) is a Turkmen politician and former Deputy Chairman of the Cabinet of Ministers of Turkmenistan.

Çaryýew was born in 1932. He graduated from Turkmen Agricultural Institute in 1955. He worked as an engineer.

Çaryýew was appointed as the first deputy chairman of the council of ministers of Turkmenistan from January to December 1991, and then as Deputy Chairman of the Cabinet of Ministers from January 1992 to June 1992. He was responsible for economy and investment.

In June 1992 Çaryýew was sent as ambassador to Iran. In 1994 he was recalled from Tehran, and forced into retirement.

In 1997 he criticized the government on Radio Liberty.
