= Orazgeldi Aýdogdiýew =

Turkmen politician

Deputy Chairman of the Cabinet of Ministers
- In office June 1992 – 1 April 2001
- President: Saparmyrat Nyýazow
- Preceded by: Ata Çaryýew
- Succeeded by: Gurbanguly Berdimuhamedow

Personal details
- Born: 1948 (age 77–78)

Orazgeldi Aýdogdiýew (Cyrillic: Оразгельды Айдогдыев) is a Turkmen politician and former Deputy Chairman of the Cabinet of Ministers of Turkmenistan.

Aýdogdiýew was born in 1948 in Mary Region. He graduated from the Turkmen State University in 1971, and from the Academy of Sciences of the Soviet Union in 1980.

Aýdogdiýew was a head of department in Mary regional committee of the Communist Party of Turkmenistan from 1980 to 1991. He was the deputy chairman of the People's Deputies in the Mary Regional Council from 1991 to 1992.

In June 1992 Aýdogdiýew was appointed as Deputy Chairman of the Cabinet of Ministers, and he was responsible for overseeing media. He was removed as vice president in April 2001. He had been the minister of culture since 1995, and was fired from that position for shortcomings in November 2003.
