= 2017 Turkmen by-elections =

Two parliamentary by-elections were held in Turkmenistan on 21 May 2017. In the Gunesh constituency G.Mammedova was elected, whilst G.Ataeva was elected in Vekil constituency.

Members of the Assembly of Turkmenistan are elected in single-member constituencies by first-past-the-post voting. Voter turnout was 91.02%.
