= Bagyr =

- Location in Turkmenistan
- Coordinates: 37.9677°N 58.2157°E
- Country: Turkmenistan
- City: Ashgabat
- District: Büzmeýin District
- Time zone: GMT+5

Bagyr is a former village that has been annexed by the city of Ashgabat, the capital of Turkmenistan. It is presently a neighborhood of the capital city. Bagyr features archeological sites.

== Sites ==
=== Kulmergen Kala ===
A fortress constructed in the 19th century, the walls are all that remains.

=== Shikhalov Mausoleum ===
An octagonal domed structure (also called Shikh Alou Mausoleum), this is believed to house the tomb of Nasipuri Sufi ascetic Abū ʿAlī al-Daqqāq (d. 1015).
