= Rejepbaý Arazow =

Turkmenistan politician (born 1947)

Rejepbaý Arazowiç Arazow (born 1947) is a Turkmen politician who served as the first civilian minister of defence of Turkmenistan from 2002 to 2003. He is also a former parliamentary legislator.

== Biography ==
He was born in 1947 in a small village in the Balkan Region. He began his career in 1963 as a laboratory assistant at the cattle workshop of the oil and gas production department of Kumdagnef. Then he worked as an assistant driller of the Kuydzhuk exploration drilling department, first deputy chairman of the "Turkmenneft" State Enterprise. In 1971 he graduated from the Turkmen Polytechnic Institute, majoring in geology and exploration of oil and gas fields. From 1998 to 2000, he was Minister of the Oil and Gas Industry and Mineral Resources of Turkmenistan. After leaving this position, he became the Hakim of the Balkan Region and later served as the chairman of the Assembly of Turkmenistan until early 2002. On 14 March 2002, he was appointed to the post of Minister of Defense of Turkmenistan. He concurrently served as a deputy chairman of the Cabinet of Ministers. Over a year later, he was dismissed on 29 September 2003 for health reasons. Upon announcing the dismissal of Arazow, President Saparmyrat Nyýazow recommended that he be elected chairman of the National Trade Union Center of Turkmenistan. The election did not take place.
