= Agrarian Party of Turkmenistan =

Political party in Turkmenistan

Agrarian Party of Turkmenistan Türkmenistanyň agrar partiýasy
- Abbreviation: TAP (Turkmen); АПТ (Russian)
- Leader: Rejep Bazarow
- Founded: 28 September 2014; 11 years ago
- Headquarters: Ashgabat, Garaşsyzlyk şaýoly, 104
- Ideology: Agrarianism; Statism
- Colours: Green; Yellow
- Seats in the Assembly of Turkmenistan: 24 / 125

Website
- tap.gov.tm

The Agrarian Party of Turkmenistan (Turkmen: Türkmenistanyň agrar partiýasy) is a registered political party in Turkmenistan, founded on September 28, 2014.

One of the three officially registered political parties legally existing in Turkmenistan, it is represented in the Assembly of Turkmenistan.

In the 2017 presidential election, the Agrarian Party nominated Durdygylyç Orazow as its candidate. As a result of the elections, Orazow took ninth (last) place among candidates, gaining 1,898 votes (0.06%). In the 2022 presidential election, the party nominated Agajan Bekmyradow who received 7.22% of the vote and achieved third place.

Among the elected deputies, members of the People's Council and local councils (Turkmen: geňeşler), elected on March 25, 2018, there are 3257 representatives of the Democratic Party, 352 from the Party of Industrialists and Entrepreneurs, 1358 from the Agrarian Party, and 2498 independents.

== Criticism ==
The party supports the policy of President Gurbanguly Berdimuhamedow and his son Serdar. According to critics, the party appeared only to create the illusion of multi-party elections.

== Election results ==
=== Presidential elections ===
Election year	Candidate	1st Round		2nd Round		Results
Election year	Candidate	# Votes	% Votes	# Votes	% Votes	Results
2017	Durdygylyç Orazow		0.06%	—N/a		Lost
2022	Agajan Bekmyradow		7.22%	—N/a		Lost

=== Legislative elections ===
Election	Leader	Votes	%	Seats	+/–	Position	Government
2018	Rejep Bazarow			11 / 125	New	3rd	Support
2023	Rejep Bazarow			24 / 125	▲13	▲2nd	Support
