= Kurban Permanov =

Soviet politician and trade unionist (1909–1969)

- Курбан Перманов
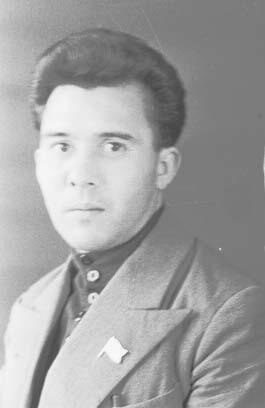

First Deputy Chairman of the Executive Committee of the Marysky Region Regional Council of Workers' Deputies
- In office December 1937 – March 1940

Chairman of the Supreme Soviet of the Turkmen SSR
- In office 26 January 1942 – 10 September 1945
- Preceded by: Allaberdy Berdyev
- Succeeded by: Şaja Batyrow

Second Secretary of the Central Committee of the Communist Party of Turkmenistan
- In office 28 November 1941 – 17 February 1945

Personal details
- Born: 1 July 1909 Transcaspian Oblast, Russian Turkestan, Russian Empire
- Died: 15 June 1969 (aged 59) Ashgabat, Turkmen SSR, Soviet Union
- Citizenship: Soviet Union
- Party: CPSU; Communist Party of Turkmenistan
- Occupation: Politician
- Awards: Order of Lenin Order of the Red Banner of Labour

Kurban Permanov (1 July 1909 – 15 June 1969) was a Soviet politician who served as the second secretary of the Communist Party of Turkmenistan. He was also the first secretary of the Chardzhou Regional Committee of the Communist Party.

== Biography ==
=== Early life, education and career ===
He was born on July 1, 1909, in the village of Kordzhou, Transcaspian region.

=== Senior trade unionist and politician ===
In March 1932, Permanov became chairman of the Turkmen Committee of the Trade Union of Workers of the Cotton Industry of the Soviet Union. He did not hold this position for long, in March 1933 he rose to the position of head of the Organizational Department of the Turkmen Council of Trade Unions. From January to July 1934 Permanov became the head of the Department of Production and Wages of the Turkmen Council of Trade Unions. Then, in July 1934, he took the position of instructor of the Ashgabat City Committee of the Communist Party of Turkmenistan.

In 1935, Permanov became deputy chairman of the Turkmen Council of Trade Unions. In 1936, Permanov took the position of second secretary of the Chardzhou District Committee of the Communist Party of Turkmenistan. In December 1937, he became the first secretary of the Mary District Committee of the Communist Party of Turkmenistan. From March 17, 1940, to November 28, 1941, Permanov held the position of Secretary of the Central Committee of the Communist Party of Turkmenistan by resolution of the First Plenum of the Central Committee of the Communist Party of Turkmenistan. On November 28, 1941, Permanov was appointed to the post of second secretary of the Central Committee of the Communist Party of Turkmenistan. Permanov held this position until February 17, 1945. On January 26, 1942, by the resolution of the sixth session of the Supreme Soviet of the Turkmen SSR, Permanov was appointed second secretary of the Central Committee of the Communist Party of Turkmenistan. On September 10, 1945, he was removed from this position.

From January to August 1947, Permanov was Deputy Secretary of the Central Committee of the Communist Party of Turkmenistan for Industry and Transport. From August 1947 to December 1953, he took the position of 1st Secretary of the Chardzhou Regional Committee of the Central Committee of the Communist Party. On February 20, 1955, Permanov held the position of Minister of Meat and Dairy Products Industry of the Turkmen SSR until 1957. On June 1, 1957, he began to hold the position of head of the Food Industry Department of the Agricultural and National Economy of the Turkmen Administrative Economic District. In March 1963 Permanov retired.

== Awards ==
- Two Orders of Lenin (1939, 1944)
- Two Orders of the Red Banner of Labour (1950, 1957)
