= Öwezgeldi Ataýew =

Turkmen politician (born 1951)

Öwezgeldi Ataýev

5th Chairman of the Assembly of Turkmenistan
- In office 12 November 2002 – 22 December 2006
- Preceded by: Tagandurdy Hallyýew
- Succeeded by: Akja Nurberdiýewa

Chief Justice of Turkmenistan
- In office 6 January 1999 – 12 November 2002
- Preceded by: Ata Rahmanow
- Succeeded by: Ýagşygeldi Esenow

Personal details
- Born: 1951 (age 74–75) Ashkhabad, Turkmen SSR, USSR (now Ashgabat, Turkmenistan)
- Party: Democratic Party of Turkmenistan
- Occupation: Politician

Öwezgeldi Ataýev (Russian: Овезгельды Атаев, romanized: Ovezgel'dy Atayev; born 1951) is a Turkmen politician. He was the chairman of the Assembly of Turkmenistan from 2002 to 2006. According to the Constitution of Turkmenistan, he was to become the acting president after the death of Saparmurat Niyazov in December 2006. However, the State Security Council of Turkmenistan reported that Atayev was not appointed acting president due to a criminal case started against him. Atayev was charged with abuse of power and human rights violations.

Gurbanguly Berdimuhamedow, who was one of several Deputy Prime Ministers and Minister of Health, succeeded Niyazov instead. According to Kommersant, Atayev was arrested on 21 December 2006. Berdimuhamedow signed an order dismissing Atayev for "committing a deed incompatible with the high position entrusted to him". Atayev was accused in a statement of harassing and humiliating his daughter-in-law and driving her to attempted suicide. He was subsequently imprisoned until March 2012.
