= Akja Nurberdiýewa =

Turkmen politician (born 1957)

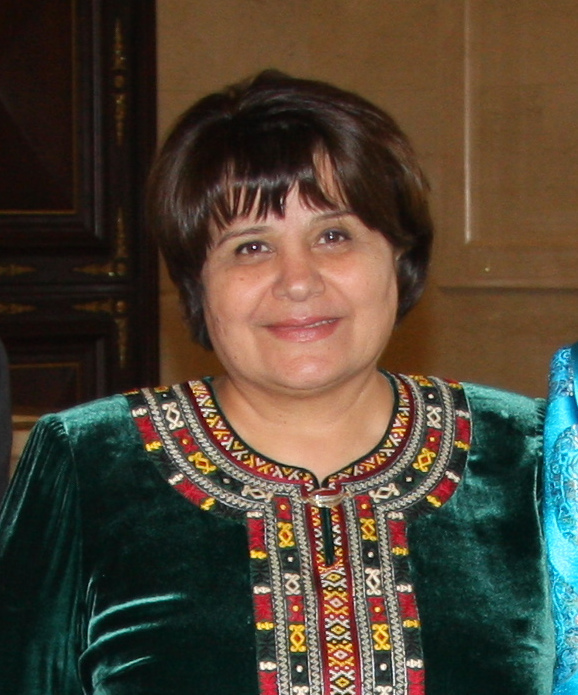
- Nurberdiýewa in 2015

6th Chairperson of the Assembly of Turkmenistan
- In office 22 December 2006 – 30 March 2018; Acting until 23 February 2007
- President: Gurbanguly Berdimuhamedow
- Preceded by: Öwezgeldi Ataýew
- Succeeded by: Gülşat Mämmedowa

Personal details
- Born: Akja Täjiýewna Nurberdiýewa; 1957 (age 68–69) Ashkhabad, Turkmen SSR, Soviet Union
- Party: Democratic Party of Turkmenistan

Akja Täjiýewna Nurberdiýewa (born 1957) is a Turkmen politician who has served as the Chairperson of the Assembly of Turkmenistan from 2006 to 2018. She replaced Öwezgeldi Ataýew who was arrested the previous day.

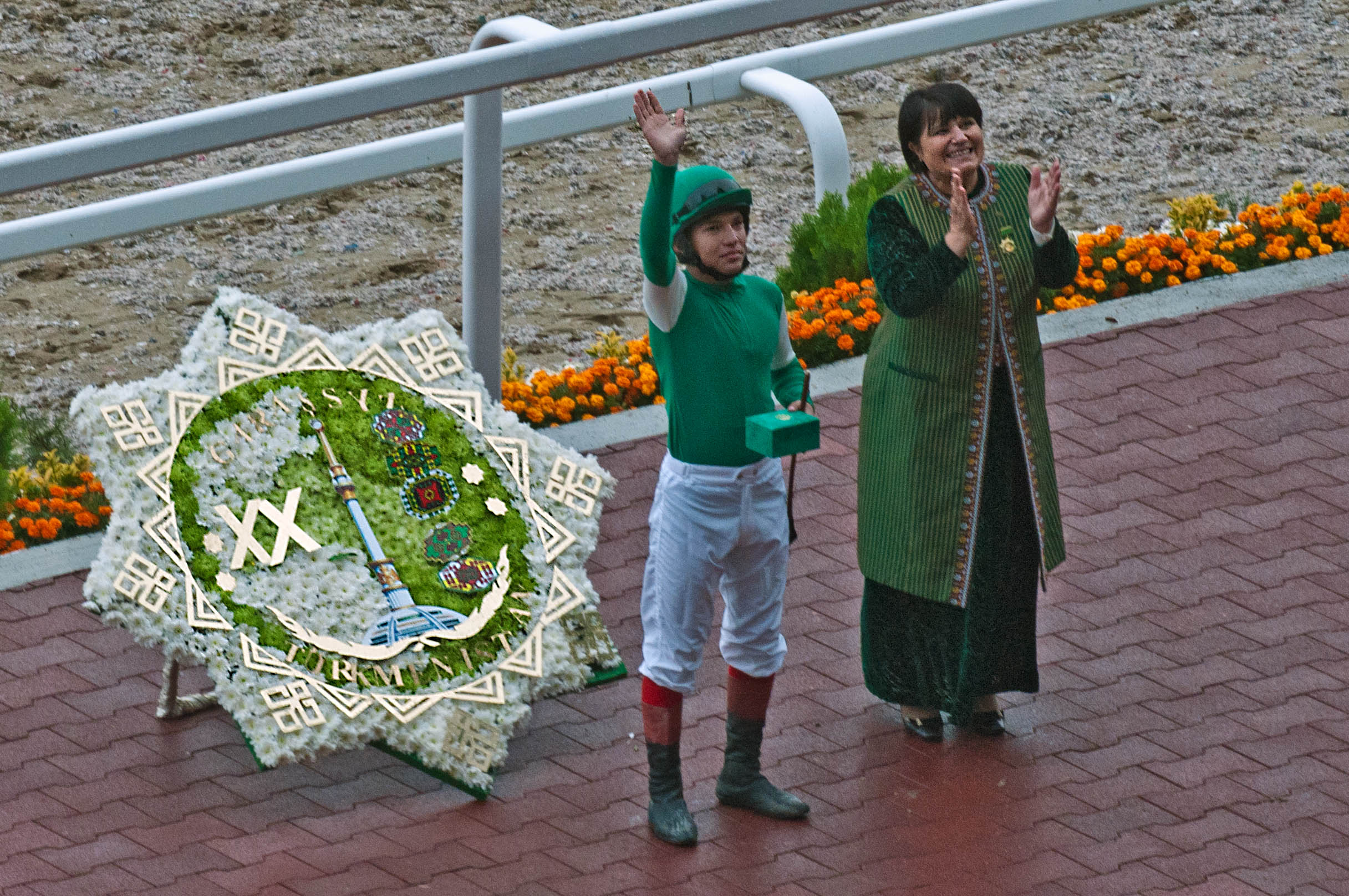
Akja Nurberdiýewa opens the Ahal Velayat Equestrian Complex

== Biography ==
The first two subsections are translations of the Russian-language Wikipedia article Нурбердыева, Акджа Таджиевна

=== Education ===
Akja Nurberdiýewa holds a candidate of philosophical sciences degree and was educated as a teacher.

=== Political career ===
From 2000 to 2005 Nurberdiýewa was a deputy of the Assembly of Turkmenistan (Turkmen: Mejlis), 2nd convocation. As of 2005 she became deputy speaker of the Mejlis in the new convocation. Concurrently, she was an elected secretary of the Democratic Party of Turkmenistan from Ahal Province, and chair of the National Labor Union Center until 23 February 2007.

From 22 December 2006 until 23 February 2007 she was acting speaker of the Mejlis. On 23 February 2007 she was elected speaker of the Mejlis. In 2014 she was re-elected.

On 30 March 2018 she stepped down from the speakership of the Mejlis and was allowed to retire.

=== Post-Mejlis career ===
According to opposition media, following retirement from the Mejlis Nurberdiýewa became an instructor at the civil service academy.

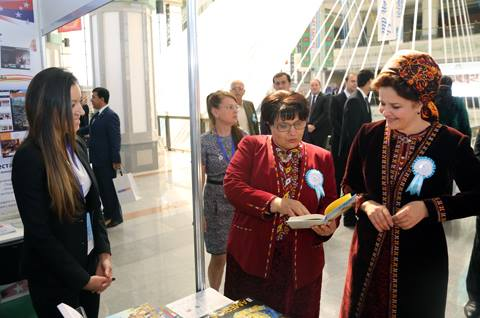
Tetyana Ivanishena, press attache of the U.S. Embassy in Ashgabat, presents a copy of "Charlotte's Web" to Akja Nurberdiýewa and Maýsa Ýazmuhamedowa.

== Decorations ==
- Order of Gurbansoltan eje
- Medal "20 Years of Independence of Turkmenistan"
- Medal "Magtymguly Pyragy"
- Medal "25 years of Independence of Turkmenistan"
