= 2017 Turkmenistan presidential election =

- 12 February 2017
- Registered: 3,252,243
- Turnout: 97.28%
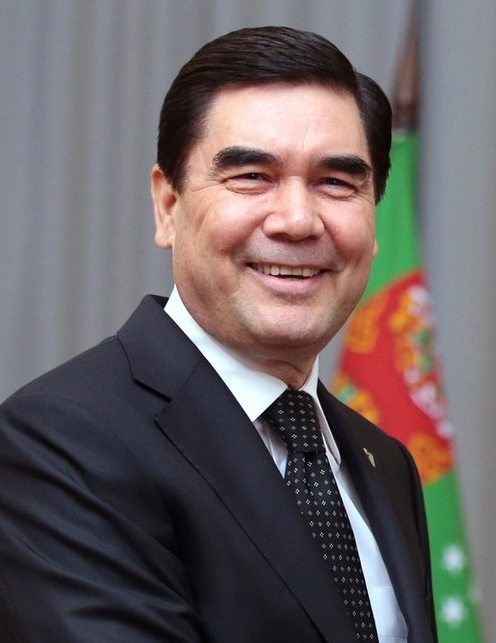

Nominee	Gurbanguly Berdimuhamedow	Maksat Annanepesow
Party	Independent	Independent
Popular vote	3,090,610	32,269
Percentage	97.69%	1.02%
- Results by region
President before election
Gurbanguly Berdimuhamedow
Independent
Elected President
Gurbanguly Berdimuhamedow
Independent

Presidential elections were held in Turkmenistan on 12 February 2017. This was Turkmenistan's fifth presidential election and decided who would be the country's president for the next seven years. Incumbent President Gurbanguly Berdimuhamedow won with more than 97% of the vote, similar to the results of the 2012 elections.

The result was widely expected; although the election was nominally contested by nine candidates, all opposition candidates were appointed by the government and the elections were regarded by foreign organisations as not being a free and fair contest.

== Background ==
In September 2016, the constitution was changed to remove term limits and the 70 year-old age limit for presidential candidates, as well as extending the presidential term from five to seven years.

== Electoral system ==
The President of Turkmenistan is elected using the two-round system.

== Candidates ==
The Democratic Party nominated the incumbent President, Gurbanguly Berdimuhamedow, who won 97.14% of the vote in the previous elections. A total of 9 candidates were approved by the Central Election Committee. The opposition candidates' manifestos were published in the state-controlled mass media.

Name	Party	Position
Maksat Annanepesow	Independent	Chairman of the State Food Industry Association
Jumanazar Annaýew	Independent	Deputy Head of Mary Region
Bekmyrat Atalyýew	Party of Industrialists and Entrepreneurs	Member of Parliament
Gurbanguly Berdimuhamedow (Incumbent)	Democratic Party of Turkmenistan/Independent	President of Turkmenistan
Ramazan Durdyýew	Independent	Member of Parliament
Meretdurdy Gurbanow	Independent	Deputy Head of Daşoguz Region
Serdar Jelilow	Independent	Head of the Department of Economic Development, Akhal Region
Süleýmannepes Nurnepesow	Independent	Chief Executive of Garabogazsulfat
Durdygylyç Orazow	Agrarian Party	Head of Mary Region

== Results ==
Candidate	Party	Votes	%
Gurbanguly Berdimuhamedow	Democratic Party/Independent	3,090,610	97.69
Maksat Annanepesow	Independent	32,269	1.02
Bekmyrat Atalyýew	Party of Industrialists and Entrepreneurs	11,389	0.36
Serdar Jelilow	Independent	7,909	0.25
Jumanazar Annaýew	Independent	6,643	0.21
Meretdurdy Gurbanow	Independent	5,378	0.17
Ramazan Durdyýew	Independent	4,745	0.15
Süleýmannepes Nurnepesow	Independent	2,847	0.09
Durdygylyç Orazow	Agrarian Party	1,898	0.06
Total		3,163,688	100.00
Registered voters/turnout		3,252,243	–
Source: TRT, Government of Turkmenistan
