= Party of Industrialists and Entrepreneurs of Turkmenistan =

Political party in Turkmenistan

Party of Industrialists and Entrepreneurs of Turkmenistan Türkmenistanyň Senagatçylar we Telekeçiler partiýasy
- Abbreviation: TSTP (Turkmen); ПППТ (Russian)
- Chairman: Saparmyrat Owganow
- Founder: Ovezmammed Mammedov
- Founded: 21 August 2012; 14 years ago
- Preceded by: Union of Industrialists and Entrepreneurs of Turkmenistan
- Headquarters: Ashgabat, Saparmurat Turkmenbashi Avenue 81
- Membership (2016): 14,500
- Ideology: Industrialism; SME interests Statism
- Colours: Green; Blue-green
- Seats in the Mejlis: 18 / 125

Website
- tstp.gov.tm

The Party of Industrialists and Entrepreneurs of Turkmenistan (Turkmen: Türkmenistanyň Senagatçylar we Telekeçiler partiýasy) is a political party in Turkmenistan. The party originated in August 2012 as the first legal opposition party in the country. On 10 June 2013, Party leader Ovezmammed Mammedov was elected to the Assembly of Turkmenistan in a by-election held for five vacant seats.

In December 2017 delegates at the second national party conference elected Saparmyrat Ovganov as the party's new leader.

== Criticism ==
The party supports the policy of President Gurbanguly Berdimuhamedow and Serdar. According to critics, the party appeared only to create the illusion of multiparty elections.

== Election results ==
=== Presidential elections ===
Election year	Candidate	1st Round		2nd Round		Results
Election year	Candidate	# Votes	% Votes	# Votes	% Votes	Results
2017	Bekmyrat Atalyýew		0.36%	—N/a		Lost
2022	Babamyrat Meredow		1.08%	—N/a		Lost

=== Legislative elections ===
Election	Leader	Votes	%	Seats	+/–	Position	Government
2013	Ovezmammed Mammedov			14 / 125	New	4th	Support
2018	Saparmyrat Owganow			11 / 125	▼3	▲2nd	Support
2023	Saparmyrat Owganow			18 / 125	▲7	▼3nd	Support
