= Gülşat Mämmedowa =

Turkmen politician (born 1964)

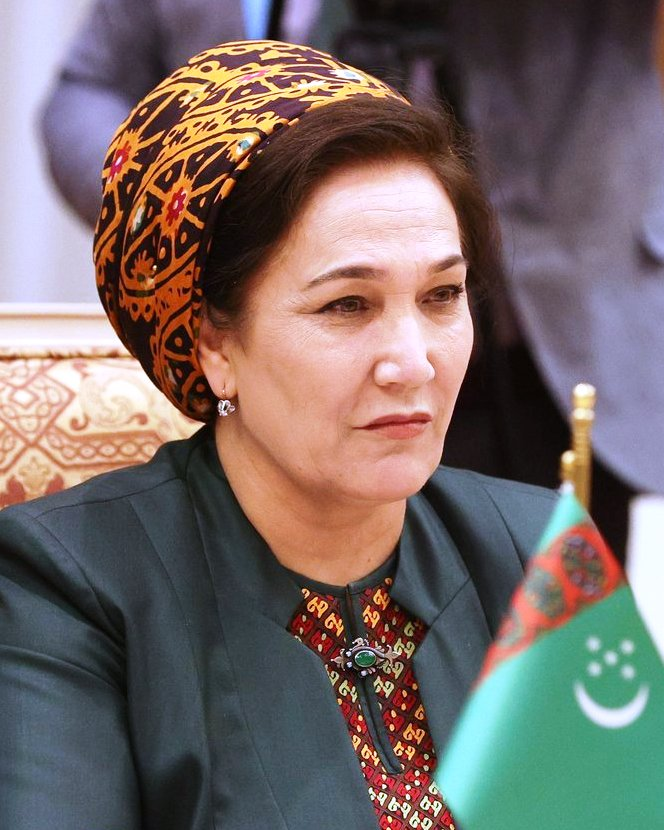

Mayor (Häkim) of Arkadag
- Incumbent
- Assumed office 6 May 2024
- President: Gurbanguly Berdimuhamedow; Serdar Berdimuhamedow
- Preceded by: Shamuhammet Durdylyyev

7th Chairperson of the Assembly of Turkmenistan
- In office 30 March 2018 – 6 April 2023
- Preceded by: Akja Nurberdiýewa
- Succeeded by: Dünýägözel Gulmanowa

Personal details
- Born: Gülşat Sahyýewna Mämmedowa; 1964 (age 61–62) Ashkhabad, Turkmen SSR, Soviet Union
- Children: 3
- Education: Turkmen State University
- Occupation: Teacher, politician

Gülşat Sahyýewna Mämmedowa (born 1964) is a Turkmen politician and former chairperson of the Turkmen Mejlis, the lower chamber of the National Council of Turkmenistan. She was previously deputy chair of the Mejlis. She succeeded Akja Nurberdiýewa. She is currently mayor of the city of Arkadag.

== Biography ==
She was born in Ashkhabad, and studied at Turkmen State University, then worked as a researcher from 1988 to 2015. In 2009, she became the Turkmen Minister of Education, following the dismissal of Muhammetgeldi Annaamanov, having previously served as deputy minister. She was herself reprimanded by President Berdimuhamedow in 2012 "for poor performance of official duties" as a result of problems with the examination process, and lost her position in 2015.

In 2016, she became the Deputy Chairman of the Cabinet of Ministers of Turkmenistan for Culture and Media, in which role she announced a competition for young singers and gifted children, and others working in the sphere of the arts, to win a presidential award. She also reported on Turkmenistan Culture Days held in other countries. In greeting his new cabinet in February 2017, President Berdimuhamedow praised the former minister and said that "her experience and knowledge will be used in another important area".

On 6 May 2024 Mämmedowa was appointed mayor (häkim) of the city of Arkadag by presidential decree, succeeding Shamuhammet Durdylyyev.
