= Chairman of the Assembly of Turkmenistan =

- Mejlisiň başlyklarynyň sanawy
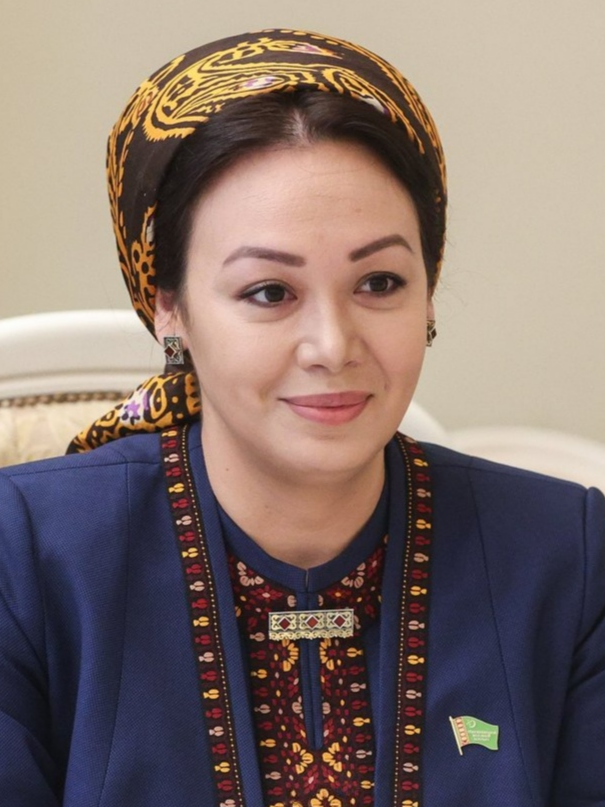
- Incumbent; Dünýägözel Gulmanowa since April 6, 2023
- Seat: Assembly of Turkmenistan Building, Ashgabat, Turkmenistan
- Nominator: Assembly of Turkmenistan
- Appointer: Secret ballot
- Term length: Five years
- Constituting instrument: Constitution of Turkmenistan
- Precursor: Chairman of the Presidium of the Supreme Soviet of the Turkmen SSR
- Formation: 18 November 1990; 35 years ago
- First holder: Sahat Muradow
- Deputy: First Deputy Chairman
- Website: mejlis.gov.tm

The chairman of the Assembly of Turkmenistan (Turkmen: Mejlisiň başlyklarynyň sanawy) is the presiding officer of the Assembly of Turkmenistan, Turkmenistan's unicameral parliament. The chairman presides over the parliament and its procedures. Chairmen are elected by open voting from the parliament's deputy ranks. Dünýägözel Gulmanowa is the current chairman since being confirmed on April 6, 2023.

== Election ==
The Chairperson of the Mejlis is elected by secret ballot by at least two-third majority of the total members of the Mejlis. He/she is elected from among the deputies.

== Authority ==
The Chairman of the Assembly is allowed to:

1. preside over meetings of parliament;
2. organize work of the assembly and coordinate its activities;
3. sign and promulgate acts adopted by the assembly;
4. represent the parliament in relation with other bodies of state power of Ukraine and with the bodies of power of other states;
5. organize the work of the staff of the parliament.

The chairman is head of the presidium that spearheads the organization of activity of the Mejlis of Turkmenistan. The presidium consists of the Chairperson, a deputy, chairpersons of committees and commissions. Vice Chairperson of the Mejlis shall be elected by open ballot, shall perform functions on behalf of the Chairperson, and shall act as Chairperson of the Mejlis in the absence of the Chairperson or his inability to exercise his/her powers.

== Head of state ==
The Chairman is designated as the first in the order of succession to the presidency, with limited authority. If the President of Turkmenistan, for whatever reason, is unable to perform his/her duties, pending the election of the new President, the duties of the President of Turkmenistan are assigned to the Chairperson of the Assembly.

== List of chairmen ==
Photo	Name	Took office	Left office	Notes
	Sahat Muradow	November 18, 1990	May 7, 2001	
	Raşit Meredow	May 7, 2001	July 7, 2001	
	Rejepbaý Arazow	July 7, 2001	March 13, 2002	
	Tagandurdy Hallyýew	March 13, 2002	November 12, 2002	
	Öwezgeldi Ataýew	November 12, 2002	December 22, 2006	
	Akja Nurberdiýewa	December 22, 2006 (Acting until February 23, 2007)	March 30, 2018	
	Gülşat Mämmedowa	March 30, 2018	April 6, 2023	
	Dünýägözel Gulmanowa	April 6, 2023	Incumbent	
