= Assembly of Turkmenistan =

Unicameral legislature of Turkmenistan

Assembly of Turkmenistan Mejlis

Type
- Type: Unicameral Lower house (2021–2023)

History
- Founded: 1992
- Preceded by: Supreme Soviet of Turkmenistan

Leadership
- Chairman of the Assembly: Dünýägözel Gulmanowa, TDP since 6 April 2023
- First Deputy Speaker: Gahryman Rozyýew, TDP since 6 April 2023

Structure
- Seats: 125
- Political groups: Government (65): TDP (65); Supported by (60): TAP (24); TSTP (18); Independents (18)

Elections
- Voting system: First past the post
- First election: 11 December 1994
- Last election: 26 March 2023
- Next election: 2028

Meeting place
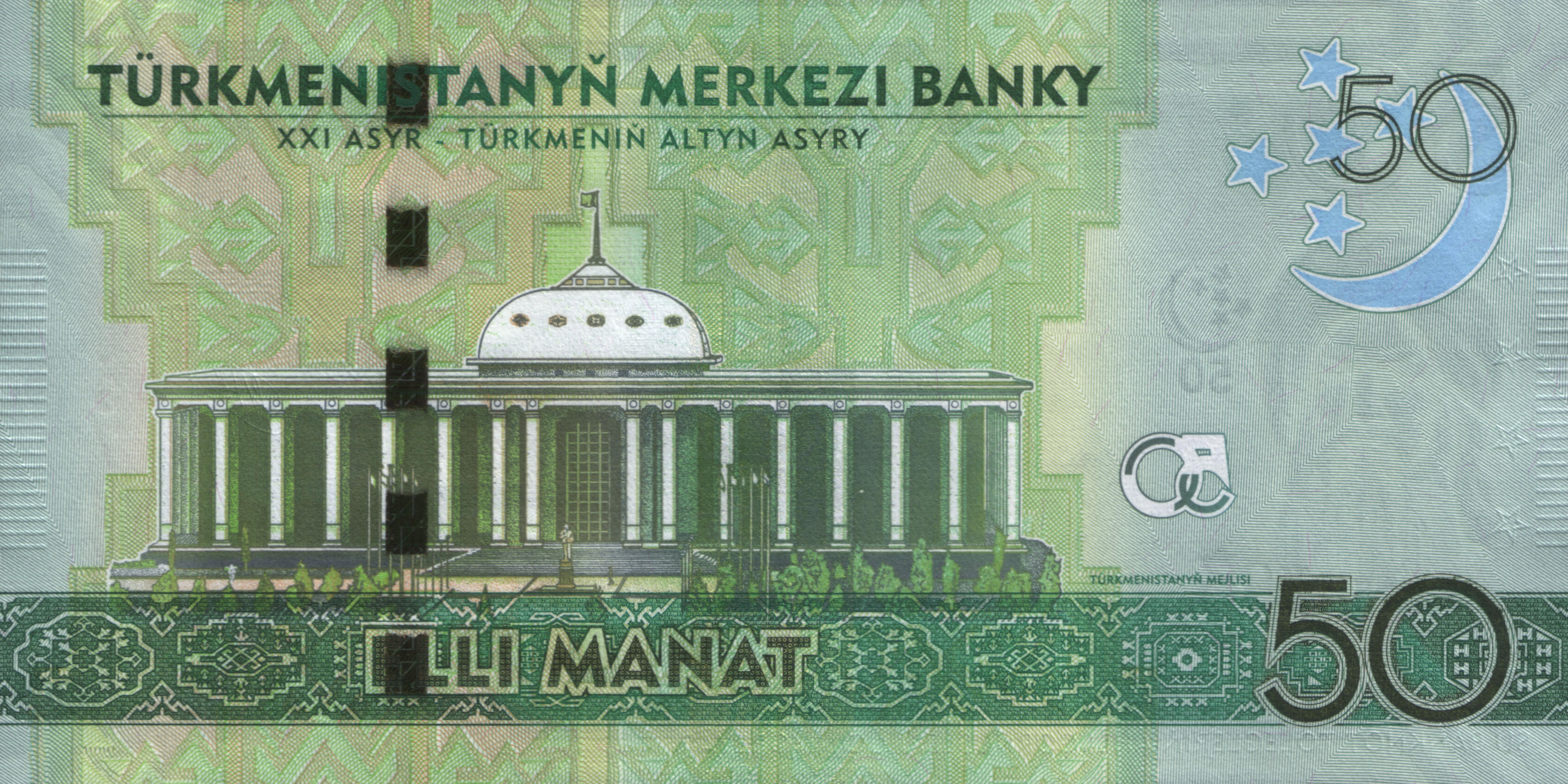
- Assembly of Turkmenistan building Ashgabat, Turkmenistan

Website
- mejlis.gov.tm

The Assembly (Turkmen: Mejlis) is the unicameral legislature of Turkmenistan. Between March 2021 and 21 January 2023, it was the lower house of the National Council of Turkmenistan. It consists of 125 members, who are elected for five-year terms in single-seat constituencies.

== Structure ==
In addition to the speaker (chairperson) and deputy speaker, the Mejlis is organised into committees, which are decided on at the beginning of each convocation. The speaker, deputy speaker, and committee chairs form a presidium, which is responsible for organizing the work of the Mejlis.

== History ==
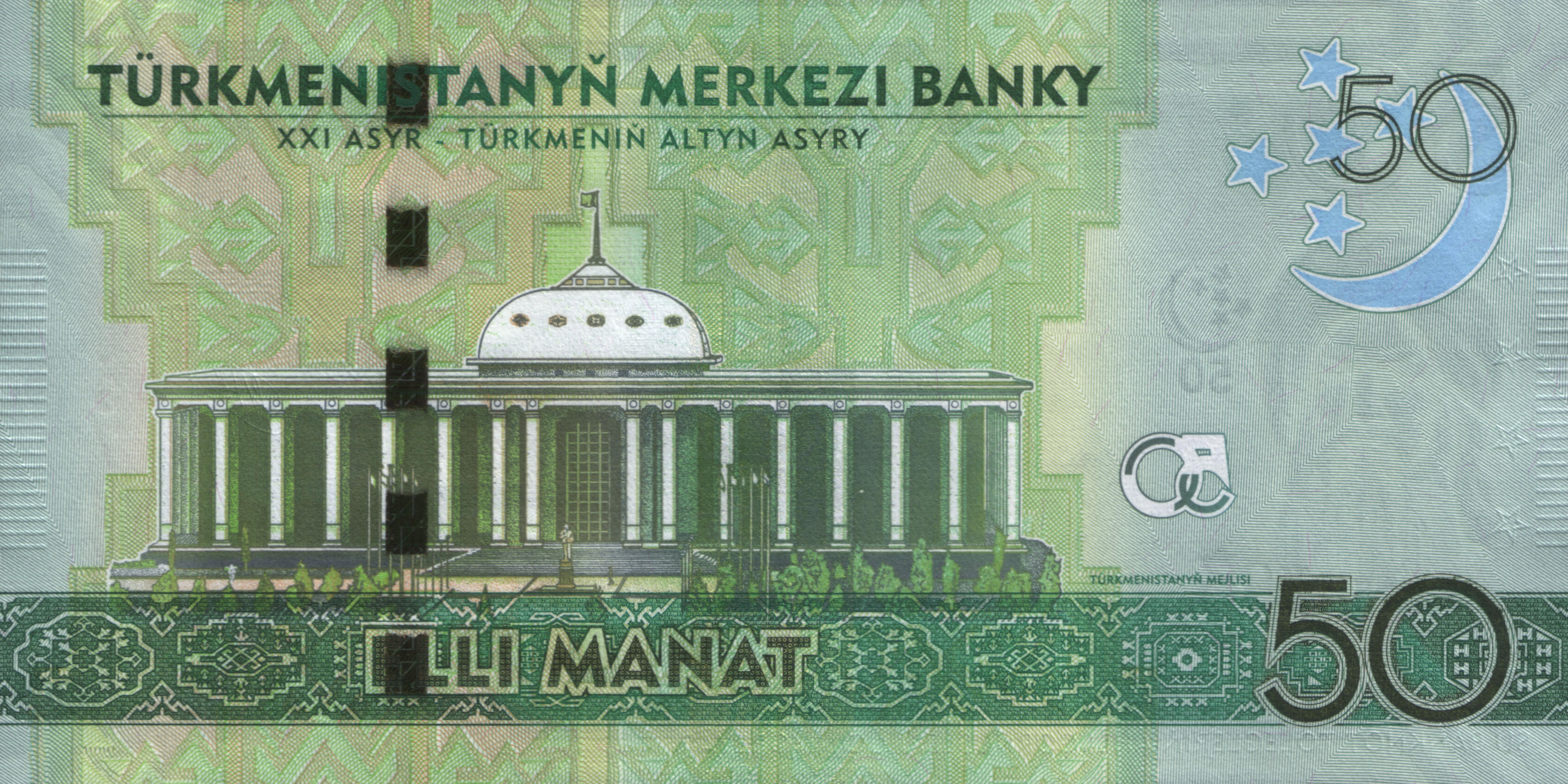
The Mejlis on the 50 manat

Originally, the Assembly shared power with the People's Council. Between 2018 and January 2023, the People's Council was restored as a parliamentary body, an arrangement formalised in 2020.

A 2003 law reduced the power of the Assembly and augmented that of the People's Council. This meant that until 2008 the Assembly could be legally dissolved by the People's Council, was led by the President, and was no longer able to amend the Constitution. Subsequently, the People's Council was demoted and reorganised into the Council of Elders by a new constitution drafted by Gurbanguly Berdimuhamedow in 2008, making the Assembly/Mejlis the unicameral parliament again.

However, following the adoption of another new constitution in September 2016, President Berdimuhamedow issued a decree on 10 October 2017 transforming the Council of Elders back into the People's Council. The first meeting of the re-created upper chamber took place following the 2018 regional and local elections. Election to the upper chamber was held on 28 March 2021.

In January 2023 both chambers of parliament proposed to abolish the People's Council (Halk Maslahaty) as a legislative organ, to reform it as an independent body, and to place all legislative authority in a unicameral Mejlis. A joint session of the National Council voted unanimously in favour of this on 22 January 2023, re-establishing a unicameral parliament with the Assembly as its sole chamber.

On 16 March 2023 President Serdar Berdimuhamedow signed into law a new "Law on the Mejlis". It confirms membership of 125 deputies in Article 2, establishes the authorities of the Mejlis in Article 18, and in Article 40 disqualifies any "member of the Cabinet of Ministers of Turkmenistan, governor, mayor, judge, prosecutor" from membership in the Mejlis.

Elections were held on 26 March 2023 for the seventh session of the Mejlis. On 6 April 2023, Dunýagözel Akmuhammedowna Gulmanowa was elected speaker. The previous chairman of the Mejlis was Gülşat Mämmedowa from 30 March 2018 until 6 April 2023. Mämmedowa succeeded Akja Nurberdiýewa.

== Powers and duties ==
The Constitution of Turkmenistan stipulates that the assembly:

- Enacts laws, makes amendments and additions to the Constitution and laws, monitors their performance and their interpretation.
- Considers for approval the programme activities of the Cabinet of Ministers;
- Examines questions related to approval of the state budget of Turkmenistan and reports on its implementation.
- Considers the basic directions and programmes of political, economic and social development of the country.
- Determines whether to hold national referendums.
- Declare the election of the President of Turkmenistan, deputies of the Mejlis, members of the velayat, district, municipal representative bodies and the Gengeshes.
- Considers the recommendations of the President of Turkmenistan on the issues related to the appointment and dismissal of the Chairman of the Supreme Court, the Prosecutor General, the minister for Internal Affairs, the minister for Justice.
- Establishes state awards, awards state decorations to the President of Turkmenistan, assigns him the military ranks and distinctions.
- Determines conformity to or divergence from the Constitution and the normative-legal Acts by the state authorities and government.
- Ratifies and denounces international treaties.
- Considers questions related to change of state borders and administrative and territorial division of Turkmenistan.
- Examines the issues related to peace and security.
- Decides other questions in the competence of the Mejlis under the Constitution and laws.

The Article 18 authorities include

1) Adoption of the Constitution and laws, amendments and additions to them, control over their implementation, and their official interpretation;
2) election of the Chairman of the Mejlis and the Deputy Chairman of the Mejlis and their dismissal from office;
3) establishment of the Presidium of the Mejlis;
4) formation, reorganization and abolition of committees and commissions of the Mejlis, approval of their compositions, election of chairmen and deputy chairmen of committees and commissions, and their dismissal from office;
(5) Mandatory consideration of the approval of laws enacted by the President of Turkmenistan;
(6) Consideration of approval of the programme of activities of the Cabinet of Ministers of Turkmenistan;
(7) Consideration of the issue of approving the State budget of Turkmenistan and the report on its implementation;
(8) Consideration of the main thrusts of domestic and foreign policy of Turkmenistan and of programmes for the political, economic, social and cultural development of the country;
(9) Deciding questions relating to national referenda;
(10) Calling for the election of the President of Turkmenistan, members of the Mejlis, provincial, district and municipal people's councils and local councils;
(11) Considering the appointment and dismissal of the Chief Justice of the Supreme Court, Prosecutor-General, Minister of the Interior and Minister of Justice on the recommendation of the President of Turkmenistan;
(12) Election of a Turkmenistan plenipotentiary - the Ombudsman, on the nomination of the President of Turkmenistan;
(13) Introduction of State honours; and
(14) Awarding of State awards and conferral of military and other State titles to the President of Turkmenistan;
(15) Ratification and renunciation of international instruments;
(16) Resolving questions related to any modification of the State border and the administrative-territorial division of Turkmenistan;
(17) Determining the conformity with the Constitution of laws and regulations issued by State authorities;
(18) Considering and approving annual and prospective plans for legislative work;
(19) Considering issues of peace and security;
20) Exercising organizational and methodological assistance in the activity of local authorities and councils;
(21) Addressing other issues falling within the competence of the Mejlis in accordance with the Constitution and laws of Turkmenistan.

The Mejlis belongs to the OSCE Parliamentary Assembly and the Inter-Parliamentary Union.

== List of chairmen ==
- Sahat Muradow (18 November 1990 – 7 May 2001)
- Raşit Meredow (7 May 2001 – 7 July 2001)
- Rejepbaý Arazow (7 July 2001 – 13 March 2002)
- Tagandurdy Hallyýew (13 March 2002 – 12 November 2002)
- Öwezgeldi Ataýew (12 November 2002 – 22 December 2006)
- Akja Nurberdiýewa (22 December 2006 – 30 March 2018)
- Gülşat Mämmedowa (30 March 2018 – 6 April 2023)
- Dünýägözel Gulmanowa (6 April 2023 – )

== See also ==
- National Council of Turkmenistan
- People's Council of Turkmenistan
- Politics of Turkmenistan
- List of Chairmen of the Supreme Soviet of the Republic of Turkmenistan
- List of Chairman of the Assembly of Turkmenistan
- List of legislatures by country
