= History of Turkmenistan =

The history of Turkmenistan traditionally began with the arrival of Indo-European Iranian tribes around 2000 BC. Early tribes were nomadic or semi-nomadic due to the arid conditions of the region, preventing widespread adoption of agriculture. The steppe culture in Central Asia was an extension of a larger Eurasian series of horse cultures which spanned the entire spectrum of language families, including the Indo-Europeans and Turko-Mongol tradition groups. Some of the known early Iranian tribes included the Massagetae, the Scythians/Saka, and early Sogdia, who were most likely precursors of the Khwarazmians. Turkmenistan was a passing point for numerous migrations and invasions by tribes, which gravitated towards the settled regions of the south, including ancient Mesopotamia, Elam, and the Indus Valley Civilisation.

The region's written history begins with the region's conquest by the Achaemenid Empire of Ancient Iran, as the region was divided between the satraps of Margiana, Chorasmia and Parthia. Later conquerors included Alexander the Great, the Parni, Hephthalites, Iranian Huns, Göktürks, Sarmatians, and Sassanid Iranians. During this early phase of history, the majority of Turkmenistan's inhabitants were adherents of Zoroastrianism and Buddhism, and the region was largely dominated by Iranian peoples. These incursions and epochs, though pivotal, did not shape the region's history as the invasions of two later invading groups: Arabs and the Oghuz Turks. The vast majority of inhabitants were converted to Hanifism, while the Oghuz brought the beginnings of the Turkic Turkmen language that came to dominate the area. The Turkic period was a time of cultural fusion and growth, as Islamic traditions brought by the Arabs merged with local Iranian cultures, and the city of Merv became a centre of commerce, science, and innovation, being an influential capital of several Islamic caliphates. The cultural landscape of Turkmenistan was further altered by Turkic invaders and rulers such as the Seljuks. Genghis Khan and Mongol invasions devastated the region during the late Middle Ages, but their hold upon the area was transitional as Timur Leng and Uzbeks later contested the land.

Modern Turkmenistan was radically transformed by the invasion of the Russian Empire, which conquered and annexed the region in the late 19th century. Later, the Russian Revolution of 1917 would ultimately transform Turkmenistan from an Islamic and nomadic tribal society to an industrialized and urbanist Leninist socialist republic during the Soviet era. Independence came in 1991, as Saparmyrat Nyýazow, a former member of the local branch of the CPSU, declared himself the absolute president for life, taking up the title "Türkmenbaşy," also known as the Leader of the Turkmen, and transformed the newly independent Turkmenistan into a totalitarian conservative dictatorship under his absolute rule. Turkmenistan has thus far been unable to significantly democratize itself, unlike most of the other former Soviet Republics, and Nyýazow ruled the country until his death on December 21, 2006. He was succeeded by Gurbanguly Berdimuhamedow in an election devoid of meaningful political competition and opposition, and Berdymuhamedow reversed many policies by Niyazov that were considered eccentric, including Nyýazow's pervasive cult of personality and the country's near total international and socioeconomic isolation, passing several economic reforms and making limited moves towards a multi-party system, although each party represented in the legislative body was under the regime's direct oversight, and open dissent against the government still faced widespread repression. Gurbanguly Berdimuhamedow was later succeeded by his son Serdar Berdimuhamedow after he stepped down from political office in March 2022, establishing a de facto political dynasty.

== Ancient history ==
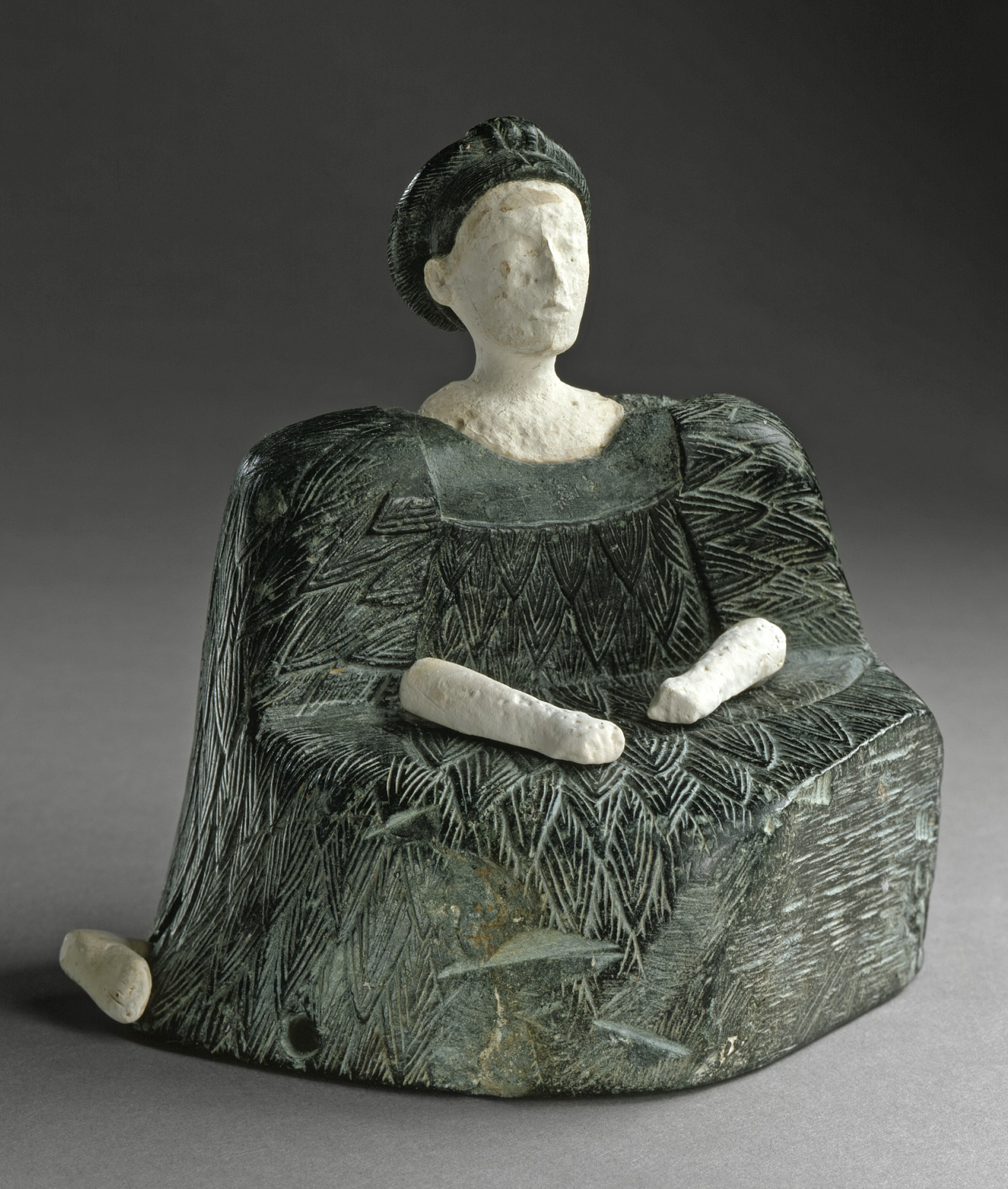
Female figurine of the "Bactrian princess" type, 2500-1500 BCE, chlorite (dress and hat) and limestone (head, hands and a leg), height: 13.33 cm, Los Angeles County Museum of Art (USA).

Scant remains point to early human settlements east of the Caspian Sea, possibly including Neanderthals, although the archaeology of the region as a whole is under researched. Bronze Age and Iron Age finds support the probability of advanced civilizations in the area including finds associated with a society known to the scholars as the Bactria-Margiana Archaeological Complex (BMAC) – near the modern cities of Mary (previously Merv), Djeitun and Gonur Depe.

By 2000 BCE, Indo-European peoples had settled throughout the region. Most of the present-day Turkmenistan was occupied by BMAC-related societies and the Dahae (also known as the Daae, Dahā, Daoi and similar names) – a tribal confederation located immediately east of the Caspian. The Massagetae and Scythians were also present, immediately north of BMAC and the Dahae.

The Parthian Empire in 94 BC at its greatest extent, during the reign of Mithridates II (r. 124–91 BC)

Alexander the Great conquered the territory in the 4th century BC on his way to South Asia. In 330 BC, Alexander marched northward into Central Asia and founded the city of Alexandria near the Murghab River. Located on an important trade route, Alexandria later became the city of Merv. The ruins of Alexander's ancient city are still to be found and have been extensively researched. After Alexander's death his empire quickly fell apart. It was ruled by Seleucids before the satrap of Parthia declared independence. The Parthians – fierce, nomadic warriors from the north of Iran – then established the kingdom of Parthia, which covered present-day Turkmenistan and Iran. The Parthian kings ruled their domain from the city of Nisa – an area now located near the modern-day capital of Ashgabat – founded by Arsaces I (reigned c. 250–211 BC), and was reputedly the royal necropolis of the Parthian kings, although it has neither been established that the fortress at Nisa was a royal residence nor a mausoleum.

Excavations at Nisa have revealed substantial buildings, mausoleums and shrines, many inscribed documents, and a looted treasury. Many Hellenistic art works have been uncovered, as well as a large number of ivory rhytons, the outer rims decorated with Iranian subjects or classical mythological scenes.

During the 4th to early 7th century CE, much of the population was already in settlements around the fertile river valleys along the Amu Darya, and Merv and Nisa became centers of sericulture (the raising of silkworms). A busy caravan route, connecting Tang dynasty China and the city of Baghdad (in modern Iraq), passed through Merv. Thus, the city of Merv constituted an important prize for any conqueror.

== Arab conquests and Islamization ==
Central Asia came under Arab control after a series of invasions in the late 7th and early 8th centuries and was incorporated into Islamic Caliphate divided between provinces of Mawara'un Nahr and Khorasan. The Arab conquest brought the religion of Islam to all of the peoples of central Asia. The city of Merv was occupied by the lieutenants of the caliph Uthman ibn Affan, and was constituted as the capital of Khorasan. Using this city as their base, the Arabs, led by their commander Qutayba ibn Muslim, brought under subjection Balkh, Bukhara, Fergana and Kashgaria, and penetrated into China as far as the province of Gansu early in the 8th century.

Merv achieved some political spotlight in February 748 when Abu Muslim (d. 750) declared a new Abbasid dynasty at Merv, and set out from the city to conquer Iran and Iraq and establish a new capital at Baghdad. Abu Muslim was famously challenged by the goldsmith of Merv to do the right thing and not make war on fellow Muslims. The goldsmith was put to death.

In the latter part of the 8th century Merv became obnoxious to Islam as the centre of heretical propaganda preached by al-Muqanna "The Veiled Prophet of Khorasan". Present Turkmenistan was ruled by Tahirids between 821 and 873. In 873, Arab rule in Central Asia came to an end as a result of the Saffarid conquest. During their dominion Merv, like Samarkand and Bokhara, was one of the great schools of learning, and the celebrated historian Yaqut studied in its libraries. Merv produced a number of scholars in various branches of knowledge, such as Islamic law, Hadith, history, literature, and the like. Several scholars have the name: Marwazi (المروزي) designating them as hailing from Merv. But Saffarid rule was brief and they were defeated by Samanid in 901. The Samanid dynasty weakened after the second half of the 10th century and Ghaznavids took present Turkmenistan in the 990s. But, they challenged with Seljuks, newcomers from north. Seljuks' decisive victory against them, present Turkmenistan was passed to them in 1041.

== Oghuz tribes ==
The origins of the Turkmen may be traced back to the Oghuz confederation of nomadic pastoral tribes of the early Middle Ages, who lived in present-day Mongolia and around Lake Baikal in present-day southern Siberia. This confederation was composed of Turkic-speaking peoples who formed the basis of powerful steppe empires in Inner Asia. In the second half of the 8th century, Oghuz components migrated through Jungaria into Central Asia, and Arabic sources located them under the term Guzz in the area of the middle and lower Syrdariya in the 8th century. By the 10th century, the Oghuz had expanded west and north of the Aral Sea and into the steppe of present-day Kazakhstan, absorbing not only Iranians but also Turks from the Kipchak and Karluk ethnolinguistic groups. In the 11th century, the Muslim Turk scholar Mahmud al-Kashgari described the language of the Oghuz and Turkmen as distinct from that of other Turks and identified twenty-two Oghuz clans or sub-tribes, some of which appear in later Turkmen genealogies and legends as the core of the early Turkmen.

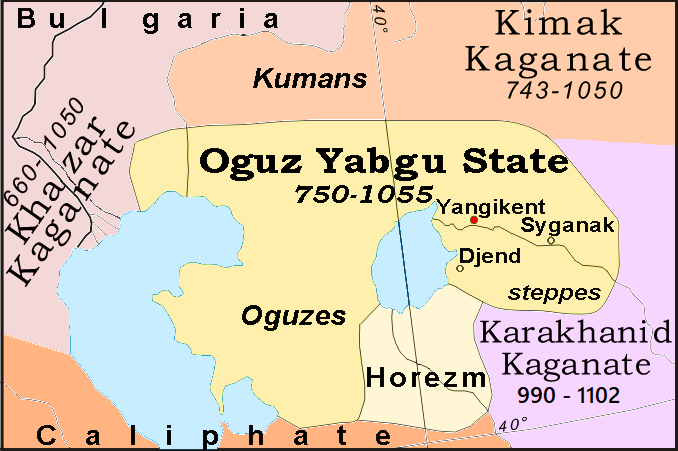
Oghuz Yabgu State, 750–1055

In Old Turkic inscriptions, there are references to several Oghuz groups like simply Oghuz, Üç-Oghuz ("three-Oghuz"; possibly Karluks), Altı-Oghuz ("six-Oghuz"), Sekiz-Oghuz ("eight-Oghuz"), possibly *Otuz Oghuz ("Thirty Oghuz"), and the Tiele-affiliated Toquz Oghuz ("nine-Oghuz") (Chinese: 九姓 Jiu Xing "Nine Surnames") in different areas in the vicinity of the Altai Mountains. Despite, the similarity of names, the Toquz Oghuz confederation, from whom emerged the founders of the Uyghur Khaganate, was distinct from the Transoxianan Oghuz Turks who'd later found the Oghuz Yabgu State: for instances, Istakhri and Muhammad ibn Muhmad al-Tusi kept the Toquz Oghuz and Oghuz distinct and Ibn al-Faqih mentioned "the infidel Turk-Oghuz, the Toquz-Oghuz, and the Qarluq" Even so, Golden notes the confusion in Latter Göktürks' and Uyghurs' inscriptions, where Oghuz apparently referred to Toquz Oghuz or another tribal grouping, who were also named Oghuz without a prefixed numeral; this confusion is also reflected in Sharaf al-Zaman al-Marwazi, who listed 12 Oghuz tribes, who were ruled by a "Toquz Khaqan" and some of whom were Toquz-Oghuz, on the border of Transoxiana and Khwarazm. At most, the Oghuz were possibly led by a core group of Toquz Oghuz clans or tribes. Likewise, Karluks and Oghuz Turks were distinct even though both were known as Turkmens in the 11th century; yet much later, Ilkhanate politician Rashid al-Din Hamadani in his Jami' al-tawarikh mentions Karluks as of the Oghuz (Turkmen) tribes.

Oghuz expansion by means of military campaigns went at least as far as the Volga River and Ural Mountains, but the geographic limits of their dominance fluctuated in the steppe areas extending north and west from the Aral Sea. Accounts of Arab geographers and travelers portray the Oghuz ethnic group as lacking centralized authority and being governed by a number of "kings" and "chieftains." Because of their disparate nature as a polity and the vastness of their domains, Oghuz tribes rarely acted in concert. Hence, by the late 10th century, the bonds of their confederation began to loosen. At that time, a clan leader named Seljuk founded a dynasty and the empire that bore his name on the basis of those Oghuz elements that had migrated southward into present-day Turkmenistan and Iran. The Seljuk Empire was centered in Persia, from which Oghuz groups spread into Azerbaijan and Anatolia.

After the fall of Göktürk kingdom, Oghuz tribes migrated to the area of Transoxiana, in western Turkestan, in modern Kazakhstan and Kyrgyzstan. This land became known as the "Oghuz steppe" which is an area between the Caspian and Aral seas. Ibn al-Athir, an Arab historian, stated that the Oghuz Turks had come to Transoxiana in the period of the caliph Al-Mahdi in the years between 775 and 785. In the period of the Abbasid caliph Al-Ma'mun (813–833), the name Oghuz starts to appear in the Islamic historiography. By 780 AD, the eastern parts of the Syr Darya were ruled by the Karluk Turks and the western region (Oghuz steppe) was ruled by the Oghuz Turks.

The name Turkmen first appears in written sources of the 10th century to distinguish those Oghuz groups who migrated south into the Seljuk domains and accepted Islam from those that had remained in the steppe. Gradually, the term took on the properties of an ethnonym and was used exclusively to designate Muslim Oghuz, especially those who migrated away from the Syrdariya Basin. By the 13th century, the term Turkmen supplanted the designation Oghuz altogether. The origin of the word Turkmen remains unclear. According to popular etymologies as old as the 11th century, the word derives from Turk plus the Iranian element manand, and means "resembling a Turk." Modern scholars, on the other hand, have proposed that the element man /men acts as an intensifier and have translated the word as "pure Turk" or "most Turk-like of the Turks."

== Seljuks ==
Seljuk Empire at its greatest extent in 1092, upon the death of Malik-Shah I.

In the 11th century, Seljuk domains stretched from the delta of the Amu Darya delta into Iran, Iraq, the Caucasus region, Syria, and Asia Minor. In 1040 the Seljuk Turks crossed the Oxus from the north, and having defeated Masud, sultan of Ghazni, raised Toghrul Beg, grandson of Seljuk, to the throne of Iran, founding the Seljukid dynasty, with its capital at Nishapur. A younger brother of Toghrul, Daud, took possession of Merv and Herat. Toghrul was succeeded by his nephew Alp Arslan (the Great Lion), who was buried at Merv. It was about this time that Merv reached the zenith of her glory. In 1055 Seljuk forces entered Baghdad, becoming masters of the Islamic heartlands and important patrons of Islamic institutions. Until these revolts, Turkmen tribesmen were an integral part of the Seljuk military forces. Turkmen migrated with their families and possessions on Seljuk campaigns into Azerbaijan and Anatolia, a process that began the Turkification of these areas. During this time, Turkmen also began to settle the area of present-day Turkmenistan. Prior to the Turkmen habitation, most of this desert had been uninhabited, while the more habitable areas along the Caspian Sea, Kopetdag Mountains, Amu Darya, and Marghab River (Murgap Deryasy) were populated predominantly by Iranians. The city-state of Merv was an especially large sedentary and agricultural area, important as both a regional economic-cultural center and a transit hub on the Silk Road. The last powerful Seljuk ruler, Sultan Ahmad Sanjar (d. 1157), witnessed the fragmentation and destruction of the empire because of attacks by Turkmen and other tribes. During the reign of Sultan Sanjar or Sinjar of the same house, in the middle of the 11th century, Merv was overrun by the Turkish tribes of the Ghuzz from beyond the Oxus. It eventually passed under the sway of the rulers of Khwarizm (Khiva). After mixing with the settled peoples in Turkmenistan, the Oguz living north of the Kopet-Dag Mountains gradually became known as the Turkmen.

The Seljuk empire broke down in the second half of the 12th century, and the Turkmen became independent tribal federation.

== Mongols and Timurids ==
In 1157, the rule of Seljuks dynasty came to an end in the province of Khorasan. The Turkic rulers of Khiva took control of the area of Turkmenistan, under the title of Khwarazmshahs in 1221, central Asia suffered a disastrous invasion by Mongol warriors who swept across the region from their base in eastern Asia.

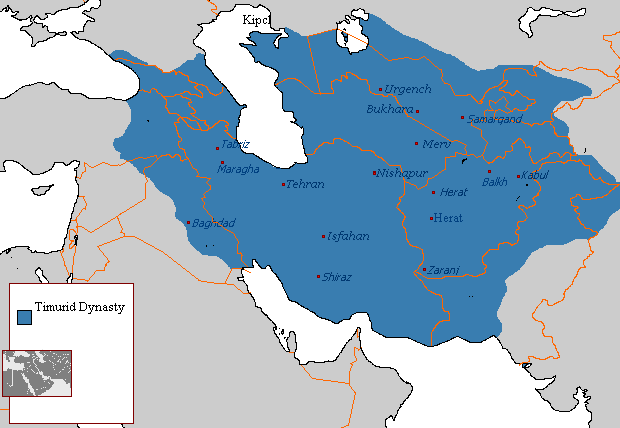
Map of the Timurid Empire

Under their commander, Genghis Khan, founder of the Mongol Empire, the Mongols conquered Khwarezm and burned the city of Merv to the ground. The Mongol leader ordered the massacre of Merv's inhabitants as well as the destruction of the province's farms and irrigation works which effectively ended the Iranian dominance in urban areas and agricultural communities of khwarezm. These areas were soon repopulated by the Turkmen who survived the invasion and had retreated northward to the plains of Kazakhstan or westward to the shores of the Caspian Sea. After the division of the Mongol Empire, present Turkmenistan was passed to Chagatai Khanate except southernmost part was belonged to Ilkhanate.

Small, semi-independent states arose under the rule of the region's tribal chiefs later in the 14th century. In the 1370s, Amir Timur (also known as Tamerlane), one of the greatest conquerors in human history, captured Turkmen states once more and established the short lived Timurid Empire, which collapsed after Timur's death in 1405, when Turkmens became independent once again.

== New political arrangements ==
As a whole, the 14th to 16th centuries was a period in which the Turkmen's dislocation due to the Mongol invasions gave way to new political groupings which became tribal groupings which have continued to modern day.

In addition to the new political arrangements, historical sources suggest that a large tribal union called the Salor confederation remained from the original Oghuz tribes and into modern times. In the late 17th century, the confederation fell apart and three senior tribes moved eastward and then southward. Of these tribes, the Ýomut split into eastern and western groups, and the Teke migrated to the Ahal region near the Köpetdag Mountains and eventually into the Murgap River basin. Other Salor tribes moved into the region near the Amu Darya delta and into other parts of modern-day southeast Turkmenistan. Salor groups also live in Turkey, Afghanistan, Uzbekistan, and China.

== Turkmenistan in the 16th and 17th centuries ==
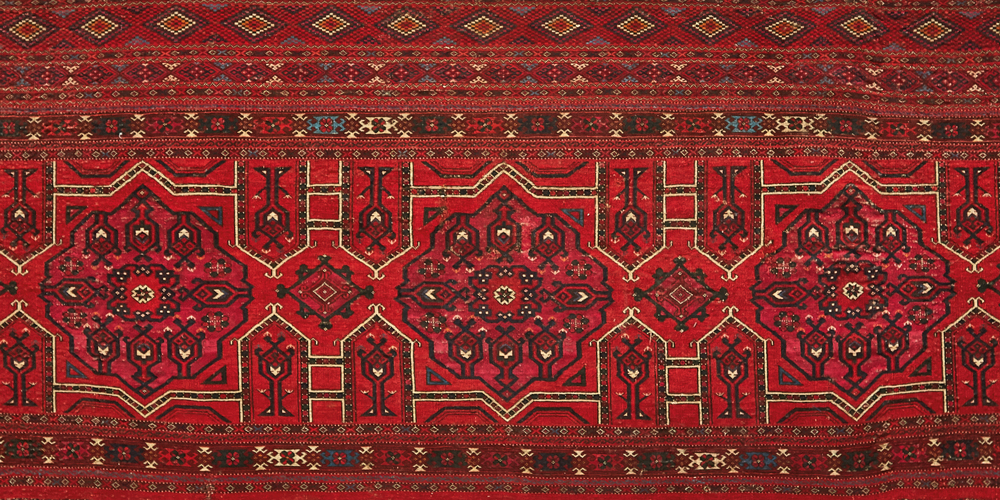
Detail of a Salyr Turkmen ceremonial carpet, dating from the mid-1700s to the mid-1800s

The history of Turkmenistan from the 16th until the 19th century is mostly known by the relations with the states of Iran, Khiva, Bukhara, and Afghanistan. Wars of the period took place mostly in the lands of Turkmenistan. The invasion of the Khan of Khiva, Abul Gazi Bahadur Khan, from 1645 to 1663, caused some difficulties to the Turkmens, coupled with the impact of the drought that occurred at about the same period, most of the Turkmens within the khanate moved to areas around Ahal, Etrek, Murgap and Tejen. In this period, many of the Turkmens tribes living around the Aral Sea also migrated because of pressures from both the Khiva Khanate and the Kalmyks, and migrated to Astrakhan and Stavropol in the northern Caucasus.

Popular epics such as Görogly, and other oral traditions, took shape during this period which could be taken as a beginning of Turkmen nation. The poets and thinkers of the time such as Döwletmämmet Azady and Magtymguly Pyragy became a voice for an emerging nation, calling for unity, brotherhood and peace among Turkmen tribes. Magtymguly Pyragy is venerated in Turkmenistan as the father of national literature. Most of present Turkmenistan was divided between Khanates of Khiva and Bukhara except southernmost parts were handed to Persia. Nader, Shah of Persia, conquered it in 1740 but after his assassination in 1747, Turkmen lands were recaptured by Uzbek khanates of Khiva and Bukhara. During the 1830s, the Teke Turkmen, then living on the Tejen River, were forced by the Persians to migrate northward. Khiva contested the advance of the Tekes, but ultimately, about 1856, the latter became the sovereign power of southern and southeastern parts of present Turkmenistan.

=== Russian colonization and Great Game ===
In the 18th century Turkoman tribes came into contact with Tsarist Empire. The Russian Empire began to move into the area in 1869 with the establishment of the Caspian Sea port of Krasnovodsk, present-day Türkmenbaşy. After the subjugation of the Emirate of Bukhara (1868) and the Khanate of Khiva (1873), the Turkmen area remained independent. Russians decided to move into Transcaspian region, allegedly to subdue Turkmen slave trade and banditry. Turkmen tribal groups were the providers of the Khivan slave trade and the Bukhara slave trade, performing regular slave raids called alaman toward Russian and German settlers along the Ural, and Persian pilgrims to Mashad, two categories who as Christians and Shia-Muslims respectively were seen as religiously legitimate to target for enslavement in the Sunni Muslim Khiva and Bukhara. The service of some Turkmen tribes, especially the Ýomut, for the Khivan Khan also encouraged the Russia to punish them by raids into Khwarazm, which killed hundreds. These wars culminated in the Battle of Geok Tepe in 1881, where General Skobelev massacred 7,000 Turkmens at the desert fortress of Geok Depe, now spelled as Gökdepe, near modern Ashgabat; another 8,000 were killed trying to flee across the desert. In September of that year, Qajar Iran signed the treaty of Akhal with Imperial Russia which officially recognized the territory that today incorporates modern Turkmenistan as part of the Russian Empire.

By 1894, Imperial Russia had taken control of almost all of Turkmenistan except around part of Konye-Urgench was in Khiva and around part of Çärjew was in the Emirate of Bukhara.

The Transcaspian Railway was started from the shores of the Caspian in 1879 in order to secure Russian control over the region and provide a rapid military route to the Afghan border. In 1885 a crisis was precipitated by the Russian annexation of the Pandjeh oasis, to the south of Merv, on a territory of modern Afghanistan, which nearly led to war with Britain. as it was thought that the Russians were planning to march on to Herat in Afghanistan. Until 1898 Transcaspia was part of the Governor-Generalship of the Caucasus and administered from Tiflis, but in that year it was made an Oblast of Russian Turkestan and governed from Tashkent. Nevertheless, Turkestan remained an isolated colonial outpost, with an administration that preserved many distinctive features from the previous Islamic regimes, including Qadis' courts and a 'native' administration that devolved much power to local "Aksakals" (Elders). In 1897 the Transcaspian Railway reached Tashkent, and finally in 1906 a direct rail link with European Russia was opened across the steppe from Orenburg to Tashkent. This led to much larger numbers of Slavic settlers flowing into Turkestan than had hitherto been the case, and their settlement was overseen by a specially created Migration Department in St. Petersburg (Переселенческое Управление). This caused considerable discontent amongst the local Turkmen population, as mainly Russian-populated cities such as Ashgabat appeared.

The best-known Military Governor to have ruled the region from Ashgabat was probably General Kuropatkin, whose authoritarian methods and personal style of governance made the province very difficult for his successors to control and led to a revolt in 1916. Consequently, the administration of Transcaspia became a byword for corruption and brutality within Russian Turkestan, as Russian administrators turned their districts into petty fiefdoms and extorted money from the local population. In 1908 Count Konstantin Konstantinovich Pahlen led a reforming commission to Turkestan which produced a monumental report detailing these abuses of power, administrative corruption and inefficiency.

== Revolution and civil war ==
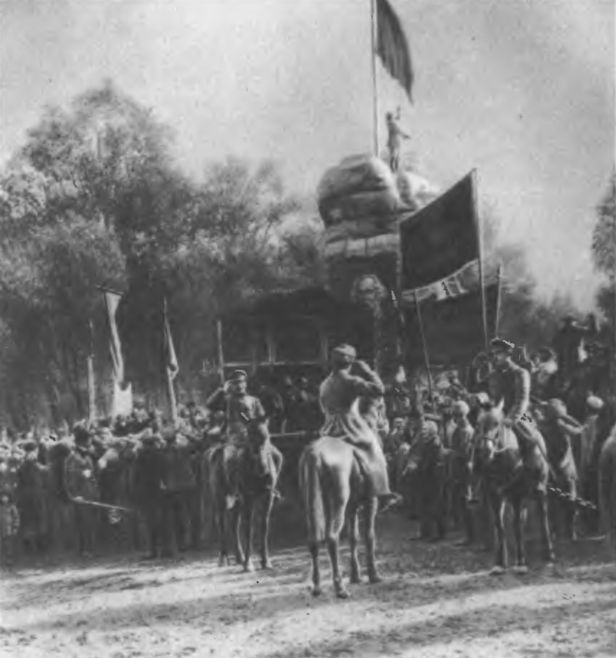
Hoisting the Red Banner in Tashkent 1917

Following the October Revolution of 1917 in Russia, Ashgabat became a base for anti-Bolshevik counter-revolutionaries, who soon came under attack from the Tashkent Soviet. The Communists succeeded in taking control of Ashgabat in the summer of 1918, forming a Soviet. In response, Junaid Khan and forces loyal to the Czarist government joined together to drive out the Communists. In July 1919, these anti-Communist allies established the independent state of Transcaspia. A small British force, led by General Wilfrid Malleson, from Meshed (Persia) occupied Ashgabat and parts of southern Turkmenistan until 1919. It is alleged that 26 Baku Commissars were gunned down by British forces or their Transcaspian allies. The region was one of the last centres of Basmachi resistance to Bolshevik rule, with the last of the rebellious Turkoman fleeing across the border to Afghanistan and Iran in 1922–23.

== Soviet Union ==
On 27 October 1924, the Turkestan ASSR was dissolved. In accordance with the decree of the Central Executive Committee of the USSR and the Turkmen SSR, it became one of the republics of the Soviet Union. At this time the modern borders of Turkmenistan were formed. The Turkmen Government renamed Ashgabat into Poltoratsk after a local revolutionary, however the name "Ashgabat" was restored in 1927. In February 1925, the Turkmenistan Communist Party held its first Congress in Ashkhabad. From this period onward the city experienced rapid growth and industrialisation, although it was severely disrupted by the October 1948 Ashgabat earthquake. With an estimated surface wave magnitude of 7.3, the earthquake killed 10,000–110,000. According to other local sources, two-thirds of a population of 176,000 inhabitants perished.

In the 1950s, the 1,375 kilometre long Qaraqum Canal was built. Draining the Amu Darya river, it enabled huge areas to be opened for cotton production. It also greatly diminished the inflow of water to the Aral Sea, resulting in an ecological catastrophe.

Turkmenistan was not among the most economically developed Soviet republics, with a largely agrarian economy. This is despite exploration and exploitation of enormous oil and gas resources – discovery of 62 trillion cubic feet Döwletabat gas field in the 1960s became the largest gas field find in the world outside Russia and Middle East.

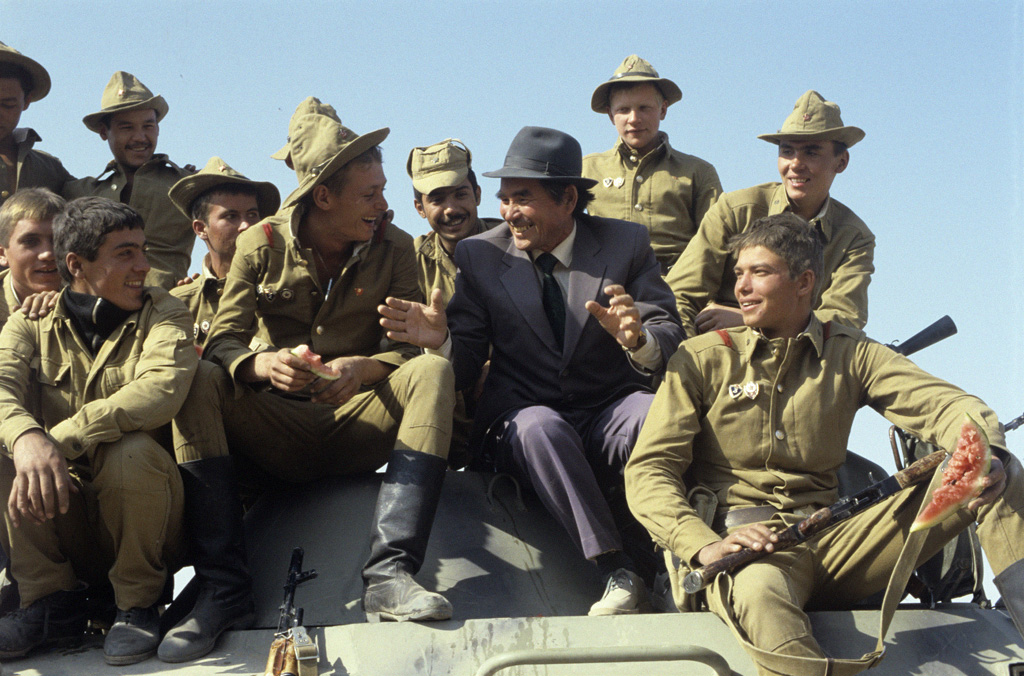
Soviet soldiers returning from Afghanistan. 20 October 1986, Guşgy, Turkmenia.

== Independence and Türkmenbaşy ==
=== Independent country and the Commonwealth ===
Post-Soviet countries have signed a series of treaties and agreements to settle the legacy of the former Soviet Union multilaterally and bilaterally.

Turkmenistan became independent on October 27, 1991, amidst the dissolution of the Soviet Union (commemorated annually). The former head of Turkmenistan's Communist Party at the time of independence, Saparmyrat Nyýazow, was elected president of the newly independent nation in an uncontested election. At the 25th Congress of the Communist Party of Turkmenistan in the autumn of 1991, the party decided to dissolve itself, a process that continued into 1992. In its place, the Turkmenistan Democratic Party (TDP) was organized, and on December 16, 1991, Saparmurat Niyazov, who was elected President of Turkmenistan in October 1990, signed a decree officially conferring TDP membership on former TCP members.

The authoritarian Nyýazow, who has assumed the title of "Türkmenbaşy", or "Leader of all Turkmen", was accused of developing a totalitarian cult of personality. His opus, the Ruhnama, was made a mandatory reading in Turkmenistan's schools and months of the calendar were renamed after members of his family. Opposition parties are banned in Turkmenistan and the government controls all sources of information. In December 1999, Turkmenistan's constitution was amended to allow Nyýazow to serve as president for life.

Nyýazow was the main proponent of Turkmenistan's constitutional neutrality. Under this policy, Turkmenistan does not participate in any military alliance and does not contribute to United Nations monitoring forces. This in fact means an internal isolation of Turkmenistan from world politics.

In late 2004, Nyýazow met with former Canadian prime minister Jean Chrétien to discuss an oil contract in Turkmenistan for a Canadian corporation. In March 2005, news of this meeting caused an uproar amongst opposition circles in Canada, who claimed the affair could damage Chrétien's legacy.

In 2005, Nyýazow announced that his country would downgrade its links with the Commonwealth of Independent States, a loose alliance of post-Soviet states. He furthermore promised free and fair elections by 2010 in a move that surprised many Western observers.

=== Death of Nyýazow ===
Nyýazow acknowledged having heart disease in November 2006. On December 21, 2006, Nyýazow died unexpectedly, leaving no heir-apparent and an unclear line of succession. A former deputy prime minister rumored to be the illegitimate son of Nyýazow, Gurbanguly Berdimuhamedow, became acting president. Under the constitution the Chairman of the People's Council, Öwezgeldi Ataýew, should have succeeded to the post. Ataýew was accused of crimes and removed from office.

== Since 2006 ==
In an election on February 11, 2007, Gurbanguly Berdimuhamedow was elected president with 89% of the vote and 95% turnout, although the election was condemned by outside observers.

Following his election, Berdimuhamedow moved to reduce foreign isolation and reversed some of Nyýazow's more egocentric and damaging policies. Internet cafes offering free and uncensored Web access opened in Ashgabat, compulsory education was extended from nine to ten years and classes in sports and foreign languages were re-introduced into the curriculum, and the government announced plans to open several specialized schools for the arts. President Berdimuhamedow has called for reform of education, health care and pension systems, and government officials of non-Turkmen ethnic origin who had been sacked by Nyýazow have returned to work.

President Berdimuhamedow began to reduce the personality cult surrounding Nyýazow and the office of the president. He called for an end to the elaborate pageants of music and dancing that formerly greeted the president on his arrival anywhere, and said that the Turkmen "sacred oath", part of which states that the speaker's tongue should shrivel if he ever speaks ill of Turkmenistan or its president, should not be recited multiple times a day but reserved for "special occasions." Previously the oath was recited at the beginning and end of TV news reports, by students at the beginning of the school day, and at the beginning of virtually all meetings of any official nature that took place in the country.

However, Berdimuhamedow is criticized for building a personality cult of his own (albeit a modest one compared to his predecessor's). For example, he is the only person whose first name is used in government press releases; other officials always have their first names abbreviated to a single letter. He is also sometimes called the "Turkmen leader" by his country's press. Additionally, while his regime is somewhat less heavy-handed than Nyýazow's, it is still rigidly authoritarian.

On March 19, 2007, Berdimuhamedow reversed one of Nyýazow's most unpopular decrees by giving pensions back to 100,000 elderly people whose pensions Nyýazow had slashed in the face of an unspecified budget crisis.

On March 20, in a decision of significant symbolic weight in the ongoing rejection of Nyýazow's personality cult, he abolished the power of the president to rename any landmarks, institutions, or cities.

On March 31, 2007, the 20th Congress of the Halk Maslahaty began in the city of Mary. New laws relating to agricultural efficiency were passed, and it was decreed that school teachers' wages would soon rise by 40%.

On May 12, Russia and Turkmenistan announced that they had reached an agreement to build a new natural gas pipeline from Turkmenistan to Russia, via Kazakhstan. This has led to speculation that the European Union will become more energy-dependent on Russia, which buys Turkmen gas at below-market prices, and that as a result Russia's political influence in Eastern Europe may increase.

On May 16, in what was described as one of his boldest moves up to that time, Berdimuhamedow sacked a high-ranking security official who had been instrumental in building and maintaining the late president Nyýazow's extensive cult of personality. According to official Turkmen news media, Akmyrat Rejepow, the head of the presidential security service, was removed from office by presidential decree and transferred to "another job." The nature of this job was not specified.

On June 14, Berdimuhamedow re-opened the Turkmen Academy of Sciences, which had been shut down by his predecessor. According to reports, as of June 25 Berdimuhamedow had also ordered the closure of the International Fund of Saparmyrat Nyýazow, the former Türkmenbaşy's personal private fund, and stated his intent to begin a series of reforms in the military.

Berdimuhamedow celebrated his 50th birthday on June 29, 2007. He was awarded the Watan Order (Order of the Motherland) for his "outstanding achievements" – a gold and diamond pendant weighing about 1 kilogram. The President also published his biography and held a gala birthday celebration. The government also issued 400 gold and silver coins decorated with the president's portrait.

In 2008, Berdimuhamedow restored the Latin-based names of the months and traditional Persian and Turkic days of the week (Nyýazow had renamed them after himself and his mother, among other things), and announced plans to move the infamous gold rotating statue of Nyýazow from Ashgabat's central square. He has not, however, moved toward Western-style democracy.

In September 2008, a new constitution was accepted by the People's Council. Parliamentary elections under this new constitution were held on December 14, 2008.

In December 2008, Berdimuhamedow announced changes to the national anthem, which involved removing the repeated references to former President Nyýazow. The new version was to take effect on December 21, the second anniversary of Nyýazow's death.

In February 2017, president Gurbanguly Berdimuhamedow was re-elected for a third term in office, after receiving 97.69 percent of all votes according to official results, following a tightly controlled and largely ceremonial election. He continued to rule as authoritarian strongman.

On 19 March 2022, Serdar Berdimuhamedow was sworn in as Turkmenistan's new president to succeed his father. He was declared the winner of the March 12 presidential election.

== See also ==
- Dissolution of the Soviet Union
- History of Asia
- History of Central Asia
- History of the Soviet Union
- Human rights in Turkmenistan
- Magtymguly Pyragy
- Merv
- Politics of Turkmenistan
- President of Turkmenistan
- Ruhnama
- Soviet Central Asia
- Indo-Aryan migration hypothesis
- Turkic migration
