= Raşit Meredow =

Vice President of Turkmenistan since 2007

His Excellency Raşit Meredow
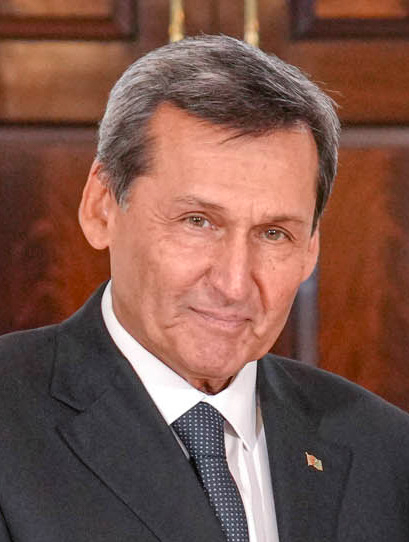
- Meredow in 2025

Deputy Chairman of the Cabinet of Ministers
- Incumbent
- Assumed office 17 February 2007
- President: Gurbanguly Berdimuhamedow; Serdar Berdimuhamedow
- Preceded by: Gurbanguly Berdimuhamedow
- In office 21 February 2003 – 7 March 2005
- President: Saparmyrat Nyýazow

Minister of Foreign Affairs
- Incumbent
- Assumed office 7 July 2001
- President: Saparmyrat Nyýazow; Gurbanguly Berdimuhamedow; Serdar Berdimuhamedow
- Preceded by: Batyr Berdiýew

Chairman of the Assembly of Turkmenistan
- In office 7 May 2001 – 7 July 2001
- Preceded by: Sakhat Muradow
- Succeeded by: Redzhepbay Arayow

Personal details
- Born: Rashit Ovezgeldyyevich Meredov; 29 May 1960 (age 66) Ashgabat, Turkmen SSR, Soviet Union (now Turkmenistan)
- Party: Democratic
- Children: Kerim Meredov
- Education: Moscow State University

Raşit Öwezgeldiýewiç Meredow (Turkmen pronunciation: [ɾɑˈʃɪt ˌøβɛðɡɛldɪˈjɛβɪtʃ mɛɾɛˈdoβ]; born 29 May 1960) is a Turkmen politician and diplomat who has served as the fourth First Deputy Chairman of the Cabinet of Ministers of Turkmenistan under President Gurbanguly Berdimuhamedow and his son, Serdar since 2007, and the Minister of Foreign Affairs since 2001.

== Early life ==
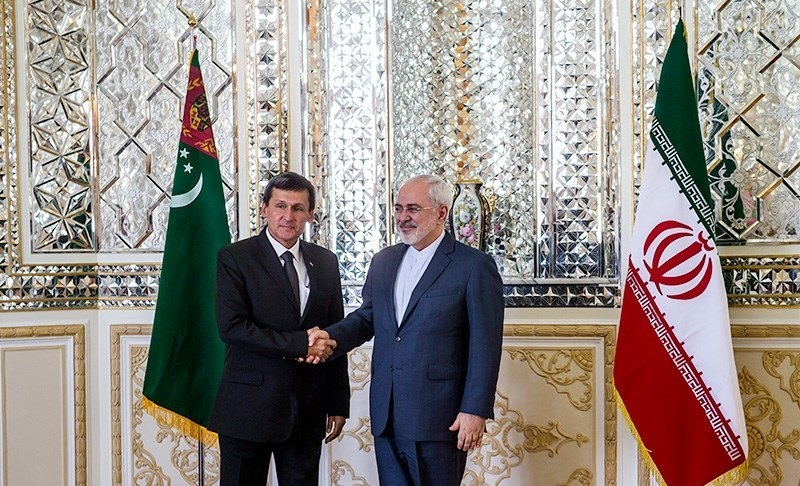
Meredow meets with Iranian Foreign Minister Mohammad Javad Zarif in Tehran, 7 May 2016

Raşit Meredow was born in Ashgabat on 29 May 1960. His father Öwezgeldi was a Turkmen scientist and lawyer. His mother is an ethnic Azerbaijani. Meredow's relatives on his mother’s side live in the city of Mary, where she herself spent her childhood before moving to Ashgabat. In January, Meredow's sister's husband suddenly died, and all of Meredow's relatives arrived there from the capital. His sister taught at Secondary School No. 2 in Mary, and later her sister transferred to teach language and mathematics courses at the Mary Educational Center.

In 1982, Meredow graduated from the Law Faculty of Lomonosov Moscow State University, and in 1982-1984 he was a lecturer in the Department of Civil Law and Civil Procedure at Gorky Turkmen State University. In 1987, he completed his postgraduate studies at Moscow State University and defended his dissertation for the degree of Candidate of Legal Sciences.

== Career ==
From 1990-1991, he was a chief consultant at the Ministry of Justice of Turkmenistan. Since 1991, he worked in the Ministry of Foreign Affairs and the Office of the President of Turkmenistan. From 1991-1993, he was Head of the Law Enforcement Department of the Council for the Coordination of Law Enforcement Agencies under the President of Turkmenistan. From March 1993 to 1994, he was the head of the Legal Department of the Office of the President of Turkmenistan.

In 1994, he was elected to the parliament of Turkmenistan. In 1996-1999, he worked as deputy director of the National Institute of Democracy and Human Rights under the President of Turkmenistan, a leading government expert organization. At the same time, in 1996, he completed short courses at the Diplomatic Academy of the Russian Foreign Ministry.

In May 1999, he was appointed as First Deputy Minister of Foreign Affairs. In December 1999, he was appointed First Deputy Chairman of the Mejlis of Turkmenistan. In May 2001, he was elected as Chairman of the Assembly of Turkmenistan. In July 2001, he was appointed as Minister of Foreign Affairs of Turkmenistan. Starting in August 2001, he simultaneously performed duties of director of the Turkmen National Institute of Democracy and Human Rights under the President of Turkmenistan. From 2003 to 2005, he worked as Deputy Chairman of the Cabinet of Ministers of Turkmenistan, a position from which

== Foreign Minister ==
Since July 2001, he has been the Minister of Foreign Affairs of Turkmenistan. Since February 2003, he has simultaneously been the Deputy Chairman of the Cabinet of Ministers of Turkmenistan (under the Turkmen constitution, the post of Chairman of the Cabinet of Ministers is occupied by the president).

In March 2005, Meredow was criticized by President Saparmyrat Nyýazow and was dismissed in 2005 for "poor performance" of his duties. After Nyýazow's death, Meredow again took up the post of Deputy Prime Minister under President Gurbanguly Berdimuhamedow, he was again appointed to this post. In April 2017, he was mentioned as the chairman of the ruling Democratic Party. He retained the post under the new president, Serdar Berdimuhamedow.

== Awards ==
- Jubilee Medal "25 years of Turkmenistan's Independence"
- "For the love of Fatherland" Medal
- "Gayrat" Medal
- Order of Independence
- Order of Friendship

Political offices
| Preceded by Sakhat Muradow | Chairman of the Assembly of Turkmenistan; 2001 | Succeeded by Redzhepbay Arayow |
| Preceded by Batyr Berdiýew | Minister of Foreign Affairs; 2001–present | Incumbent |
| Preceded by Gurbanguly Berdimuhamedow | Deputy Chairman of the Cabinet of Ministers of Turkmenistan; 2007–present | Incumbent |
