= Deputy Chairman of the Cabinet of Ministers of Turkmenistan =

Second-highest constitutional office in Turkmenistan

- Emblem of Turkmenistan

- Flag of Turkmenistan

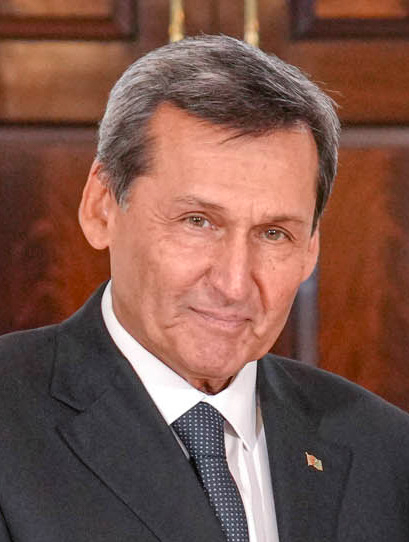
- Incumbent; Raşit Meredow since 17 February 2007
- Member of: Cabinet of Ministers
- Reports to: President of Turkmenistan
- Seat: Ashgabat
- Appointer: President of Turkmenistan
- Formation: January 1992
- First holder: Atta Charyyev

The First Deputy Chairman of the Cabinet of Ministers of Turkmenistan, sometimes referred to as the vice president of Turkmenistan, and erroneously (based on the official title, and despite the abolition of the prime minister of Turkmenistan's office) as the deputy prime minister, is the deputy head of government of Turkmenistan, serving as the senior minister of the Cabinet of Ministers. The vice president is appointed by the president of Turkmenistan. Multiple persons can be appointed as Deputy Chairmen serving concurrently.

== Status ==
The Deputy Chairman is a member of the Cabinet of Ministers of Turkmenistan. As a rule, the deputy chairman coordinates the activities of a certain range of issues (for example, the deputy prime minister for economics). It is not uncommon for the Deputy Chairman of the Cabinet of Ministers to also be a cabinet minister. The Deputy Chairman of the Cabinet of Ministers is appointed to the position and dismissed from the position by the President of Turkmenistan.

== Current Deputy Chairman ==
Portfolio	Incumbent	Since
Foreign Affairs	Raşit Meredow	2001
Agriculture and Dashoguz	Taňryguly Atahallyýew	2023
Construction, Industry, Energy and Ashgabat	Baýmyrat Annamämmedow	2023
Culture and Media	Bahar Seýidowa	2025
Economy and Finance	Hojamyrat Geldimyradow	2022
Education, Health, Science, Sports and Mary	Baýramgül Orazdurdyýewa	2024
Oil and Gas and Lebap province	Batyr Amanov	2023
Trade, Textile Industry, and Entrepreneurship, and Ahal	Nokerguly Atagulyýew	2024
Transport and Communication and Balkan	Mämmethan Çakyýew	2025

== List of total Deputy Chairmen ==
Since the formation of the Cabinet of Ministers of Turkmenistan in 1992, the position of Deputy Chairman of the Cabinet of Ministers has been held by 99 people (as of May 12, 2017, excluding those reappointed).

Image	Name	Appointed	Dismissed	Time in office	Notes
	Atta Charyyev	January 1992	June 1992	5 months	
	Mukhammed Abalakov	11 July 1995	27 June 1999		
	Dortkuli Aydogdyev	15 November 2002	16 May 2006		
	Mukhammedmurad Aydogdyev	12 May 2017			
	Orazgeldi Aydogdyev	26 June 1992	3 April 2001	8 years, 2 months	
	Aganiyaz Akiyev	22 August 2005	25 January 2006		
	Muradgeldy Akmamedov	21 July 2008	8 July 2011		
	Dadebay Amangeldyev	13 January 2017			
	Jumageldy Amansakhatov	21 July 1992	2 August 1996		
	Dadebay Annageldyev	11 October 1996	1996 or 1997		
	Bayram Annameredov	13 January 2017			
	Jumaniyaz Annaorazov	1 July 2005	12 May 2006		
	Redjepbay Arazov	14 March 2002	29 September 2003		
	Murad Artykov	10 January 2014	14 August 2015		
	Amangeldy Ataev	3 March 2000	2 October 2001		
	Kurbanmurad Ataev	10 July 2006	14 February 2007		
	Redjepdurdy Ataev	29 September 2003	6 January 2005		
	Enebay Ataeva	6 May 2002	30 October 2004		
	Nokerguly Atagulyev	22 February 2012	6 July 2012		
	Begench Atamuradov	14 November 2003	6 January 2005		
	Batyr Atdayev	5 February 2016	12 May 2017		
	Khan Akhmedov	1992	1992		
	Kurbannazar Ashirov	23 February 2007	14 April 2008		
	Maksat Babaev	5 April 2017			
	Serdar Babaev	4 July 1999	6 June 2000		
	Babamurad Bazarov	26 June 1992	1993		
	Redjep Bazarov	29 April 2016	5 April 2017		
	Dzhoraquli Babakuliev	26 June 1992	7 November 1994		
	Orazmurad Bekmuradov	31 August 2000	4 June 2001		
	Atamurad Berdyev	20 May 2005	15 December 2005		
	Gurbanguly Berdimuhamedov	3 April 2001	14 February 2007	5 years, 319 days	
	Khodzhamurad Geldymuradov	14 April 2007	15 January 2009		
	Jamal Geoklenova	24 May 1999	23 August 2002		
	Annamukhammet Goçyev	8 July 2011	9 July 2015		
	Yusup Davudov	31 October 2005	14 February 2007		
	Tuvakmamed Dzhaparov	15 January 2009	8 July 2011		
	Alexander Dodonov	22 August 1996	14 April 1998		
	Shamukhammet Durdyliev	11 January 2013	13 January 2017		
	Akmurad Egeleeiv	21 February 2012	20 September 2013		
	Ammanazar Ilamanov	2 February 1996	16 July 1997		
	Babaniyaz Italmazov	12 July 2013	7 July 2014		
	Khekım Ishanov	1 November 1994	11 October 1996		
	Yagshygeldy Kakayev	24 July 2010	8 September 2010		
	Yagshygeldy Kakayev (reappointed)	28 May 2012	8 June 2013		
	Yagshygeldy Kakayev (reappointed)	6 November 2015	5 April 2017		
	Seidbay Kandymov	6 January 2000	6 May 2002		
	Annageldy Karadzhaev	24 February 2017			
	Kurbanmukhammed Kasymov	7 January 1993	2 April 1993		
	Rovshan Kerkavov	16 January 2001	9 July 2001		
	Yolly Kurbanmuradov	2 June 1997	20 May 2005		
	Orazmurad Kurbannazarov	10 January 2011	22 February 2012		
	Orazmurad Kurbannazarov	12 May 2017			
	Gulshat Mammedova	8 April 2016	24 February 2017		
	Kurbanmurad Mezilov	8 October 2010	2 December 2011		
	Rashid Meredov	21 February 2003	7 March 2005		
	Rashid Meredov	17 February 2007	Present	19 years, 202 days	
	Sapargeldy Motaev	21 July 1992	2 August 1996		
	Amandurdy Muradkuliev	8 March 2005	27 September 2005		
	Khodzhamukhammed Mukhammedov	12 November 2007	20 September 2013		
	Mukhammed Nazarov	2001	2002		
	Gozel Nuralieva	14 November 2003	11 August 2004		
	Niyazklych Nurklychev	1992	1992		
	Mamedniyaz Nurmamedov	8 July 2011	22 February 2012		
	Byagul Nurmyradova	18 February 2012	4 April 2014		
	Geldymurad Nurmukhammedov	1992	1992		
	Saparmurad Nuriyev	7 April 1997	28 January 2000		
	Batyr Ovezov	26 December 1994	11 July 1995		
	Yagmur Ovezov	26 June 1992	2 August 1996		
	Pirkuli Odeev	1992	7 July 1997		

== See also ==
- Deputy Chairman of the Government
- Deputy Prime Minister of Kazakhstan
