= Organisation of Trade Unions of Turkmenistan =

Trade Union in Turkmenistan

- Türkmenistanyň kärdeşler arkalaşyklary guramasy
- Abbreviation: TKAMM
- Founded: 28 April 1995; 30 years ago
- Founder: Hoşgeldi Öwezow
- Headquarters: Ashgabat, Garaşsyzlyk St., 104. 744000
- Region served: Turkmenistan
- Members: 1,108,000 (2012)
- Chairperson: Gurbangul Ataýewa
- Website: tkamm.gov.tm

The Organisation of Trade Unions of Turkmenistan (Turkmen: Türkmenistanyň kärdeşler arkalaşyklary guramasy), officially the National Center of Trade Unions of Turkmenistan (TKAMM; Turkmen: Türkmenistanyň Kärdeşler arkalaşyklarynyň Milli merkezi), is an officially registered social organization in Turkmenistan, uniting trade unions in the country. It was represented in the 2013–2018 Assembly of Turkmenistan. Members of the organization was held 33 out of 125 seats in the Mejilis.

Following the results of the 2013 parliamentary election, the organization, like the Women's Union of Turkmenistan and Magtymguly Youth Organisation of Turkmenistan, entered the Mejlis of Turkmenistan for the first time. The organization is loyal to the Democratic Party of Turkmenistan, which has dominated the country since 1991.

The Organization of Trade Unions of Turkmenistan unites officially registered trade unions in Turkmenistan. The organization includes 14 branch, 5 velayat (regional), 49 etrap (district) and 9 city associations. Branches of the organization have been established in all sectoral and departmental enterprises, institutions and organizations, and associations of Turkmenistan. According to data from 2012, the organization's members number more than 1,108,000 people.
