= 2013 Turkmen parliamentary election =

← 2008–09	15 December 2013	2018 →
- All 125 seats in the Assembly; 63 seats needed for a majority
- Turnout: 91.33%
Party	Leader	Seats	+/–
TDP	Kasymguly Babaev	47	−78
TKAMM	Tumar Mukhammedowa	33	New
TZB	Maýsa Ýazmuhamedowa	16	New
TSTP	Ovezmammed Mammedov	14	New
TMÃ G	Mämmet Hojagulyýew	8	New
Independents	–	7	+7
This lists parties that won seats. See the complete results below.
Chair of the Assembly before	Chair of the Assembly after
Akja Nurberdiýewa; TDP	Akja Nurberdiýewa; TDP

Parliamentary elections were held in Turkmenistan on 15 December 2013. Although they were the first multi-party elections in the country's history, both contesting parties claimed loyalty to President Gurbanguly Berdimuhamedow. The ruling Democratic Party emerged as the largest faction in the Assembly with 47 of the 125 seats, losing its parliamentary majority for the first time since independence. The elections were criticized by the OSCE, Amnesty International, and opposition groups such as the Turkmen Initiative for Human Rights. Farid Tukhbatulin of the Turkmen Initiative for Human Rights said that there was little difference between the two major parties, arguing that neither truly represented opposition groups.

== Background ==
A new law on political parties was adopted in January 2012, with the government claiming it would make it easier for new parties to be formed to challenge the ruling Democratic Party. Subsequently, the Party of Industrialists and Entrepreneurs was established in August 2012.

== Campaign ==
A total of 283 candidates registered to contest the 125 seats in the Assembly. The Democratic Party put forward 99 candidates, the Party of Industrialists and Entrepreneurs nominated 28 candidates, whilst a further 163 were fielded by groups including a women's union, trade unions and a youth union.

== Results ==
Party	Votes	%	Seats	+/–
Democratic Party of Turkmenistan			47	–78
Organisation of Trade Unions of Turkmenistan			33	New
Women's Union of Turkmenistan			16	New
Party of Industrialists and Entrepreneurs of Turkmenistan			14	New
Magtymguly Youth Organisation of Turkmenistan			8	New
Citizen Groups			7	+7
Total			125	0
Total votes	2,797,637	–		
Registered voters/turnout		91.33		
Source: Government of Turkmenistan
