= 2007 Turkmen People's Council election =

- 9 December 2007
- Seats in the People's Council
Party	Leader	Vote %	Seats	+/–
TDP	Gurbanguly Berdimuhamedow	100	2507	0
This lists parties that won seats. See the complete results below.

People's Council elections were held in Turkmenistan on 9 December 2007. The elections were only for a part of the 2,507 members of the People's Council, and all of the candidates were of the ruling Democratic Party of Turkmenistan.

== Results ==
Party	Seats
Democratic Party of Turkmenistan	2,507
Total	2,507
