= De facto leader of Turkmenistan =

Informal political position in Turkmenistan

- Emblem of Turkmenistan

- Flag of Turkmenistan

- Incumbent; Gurbanguly Berdimuhamedow since 21 January 2023
- Style: National Leader of the Turkmen People; Arkadag
- Type: De facto Head of State
- Status: Informal term for the most important political figure of Turkmenistan
- Member of: People's Council of Turkmenistan
- Formation: January 21, 2023; 3 years ago
- First holder: Gurbanguly Berdimuhamedow
- Unofficial names: Supreme Leader; De facto Co-President

The de facto leader of Turkmenistan, also called Supreme Leader or De facto Co-President is an informal term for the most important political figure of Turkmenistan; the first and current de facto leader is Gurbanguly Berdimuhamedow, who has been the de facto leader since 21 January 2023.

== Background ==
In 1990, Turkmenistan became independent and Saparmurat Niyazov became its president, in 1999 he became President for Life, his rule was seen as a absolute one. In 2005, the People’s Council and the Council of Elders, were regarded to held the real power. In December 2006, Niyazov died; Minister of Health and Deputy Chairman of the Council of Ministers Gurbanguly Berdimuhamedow became acting President, rather than the suspected Öwezgeldi Ataýew. The media called Gurbanguly Berdimuhamedow "Heir apparent". He remained acting president until 2007, during his acting presidency and the beginning of his normal presidency a power struggle between him and other political figures like Akmyrat Rejepow broke out. Akmyrat Rejepow, was removed from his office as Security Chief on 15 May 2007 and other rivals were also removed from offices, the same month. In June 2007, Gurbanguly Berdimuhamedow, won the power struggle, who was suspected to have been supported by Geldymukhammed Ashirmukhammedov, Murad Kariyev and Akhmamed Rakhmanov. In the next years Gurbanguly Berdimuhamedow built a image of an strongman. In 2019 rumors came up that Gurbanguly Berdimuhamedow wanted to pass the presidency to his son Serdar Berdimuhamedow, while Gurbanguly becomes a Adviser and though his new role the de facto leader, similar speculations came up in 2021. In September 2020, the People's Council of Turkmenistan was restored, while still serving as president, Gurbanguly Berdimuhamedow stood for election from Ahal Province and won a seat on 28 March 2021. He was subsequently unanimously elected chairperson of the People's Council, despite this violating the constitution. On 19 March 2022, Serdar Berdimuhamedow succeeded his father as president.

== De facto rule of Gurbanguly Berdimuhamedow ==
After almost one year of Serdar Berdimuhamedow's presidency, Serdar expanded the power of his father, Gurbanguly Berdimuhamedow on 21 January 2023, who remained the Chairman of the People's Council of Turkmenistan and got the title of National Leader of the Turkmen People, with expanded power for his office as Chairman and his new title, he became the de facto leader. The expanded powers got described as the ones of a absolute ruler. While Gurbanguly became the de facto leader, his son still plays a important role in the politics of Turkmenistan as president and due to this Turkmenistan is considered to be ruled by a duumvirate, Gurbanguly however is the more powerful figure in the duumvirate. As de facto leader Gurbanguly Berdimuhamedow visited countries like the United Arab Emirates, Azerbaijan, the United Kingdom, Iran, People's Republic of China and France. As of October 2026, a suspected power struggle between de facto leader Gurbanguly Berdimuhamedow and president Serdar Berdimuhamedow broke out.

== See also ==
- Supreme Leader (North Korean title)
- Paramount leader
- Chief of the High Command
- Supreme Leader of Iran
- Supreme Leader of Afghanistan
- De facto leader of Rwanda
