= Ata Serdarow =

Turkmen politician (born 1964)

Chairman of the Democratic Party of Turkmenistan
- Incumbent
- Assumed office 2 April 2018
- Preceded by: Kasymguly Babaýew

Minister of Health of Turkmenistan
- In office 27 February 2007 – 9 April 2010
- President: Gurbanguly Berdimuhamedow
- Preceded by: Gurbanguly Berdimuhamedow
- Succeeded by: Gurbanmammet Elyasov

Personal details
- Born: Ata Öweznepesowiç Serdarow; 1964 (age 61–62) Yasman-Salyk, Ruhabat District, Turkmen SSR, Soviet Union
- Citizenship: Soviet Union (until 1991); Turkmenistan
- Religion: Islam
- Party: TPD
- Education: Candidate of Sciences
- Alma mater: Turkmen State Medical University

Ata Öweznepesowiç Serdarow (born 1964) is a Turkmen physician, diplomat, and politician. As of 2018, he is serving as the leader of politically dominant Democratic Party of Turkmenistan.

== Early life and education ==
Serdarow was born in the village of Yasman-Salyk in the Ruhabat District of the Turkmen SSR in 1964. He graduated from the Turkmen State Medical University in 1987 with a Candidate of Sciences degree. Until 2005, he worked as a surgeon and a professor at the Turkmen State Medical University.

== Political career ==
He became the Minister of Health on 27 February 2007 and served until 9 April 2010. In July 2010, he was appointed as Turkmenistan's ambassador to Armenia and worked in the position until December 2012 when he was dismissed from the post and appointed as the ambassador to Turkey. On 16 September 2013, he was appointed as the ambassador to Israel while simultaneously serving as the ambassador to Turkey. On 26 February 2016, Serdarow was appointed as the ambassador to Belgium, he was dismissed from his position as ambassador to Israel and Turkey. On 26 March 2016, he presented his credentials to King Philippe of Belgium.

As of 2018, he was the ambassador to Belgium, the Netherlands, and Luxembourg. On 3 March 2018, Ata Serdarow was appointed as the Head of Turkmenistan Representation to the European Union. He was elected as the Chairman of the Democratic Party of Turkmenistan on 2 April 2018. Three days later on 5 April 2018, he was relieved from all diplomatic posts by President Gurbanguly Berdimuhamedow.
