= Israel–Turkmenistan relations =

- Israel: Turkmenistan

Israel–Turkmenistan relations are the bilateral relations of Israel and Turkmenistan.

Israel recognized Turkmenistan independence in 1991. Israel and Turkmenistan established relations on 8 October 1993.

== History ==
After the collapse of the Soviet Union in 1991, Israel recognized Turkmen independence that same year. Israel and Turkmenistan established relations on 8 October 1993. The former Israeli Minister of Foreign Affairs Shimon Peres visited Turkmenistan in 1994, and in 1995, the former President of Turkmenistan Saparmyrat Niyazov visited Israel and met with Prime Minister Yitzhak Rabin. In 1994, Israel and Turkmenistan signed a non-binding agreement on diplomatic cooperation. In 1995, Israel and Turkmenistan signed several agreements, in the fields of culture, education, science, health and medicine, investments, mutual protection, and tourism. In 1997, the Turkmen Minister of Health Gurbanguly Berdimuhamedov visited Israel. In 2012, Israeli President Shimon Peres sent a letter to the President of Turkmenistan Gurbanguly Berdimuhamedov to congratulate him and Turkmenistan on the twenty-first anniversary of independence, with wishes to increase relations between Israel and Turkmenistan. In 2016, the Turkmen Foreign Minister Rashid Meredov visited Israel, the first such visit in twenty years. In 2018, Israel and Turkmenistan agreed to expand economic relations. In 2023, the Israeli Foreign Minister Eli Cohen visited Turkmenistan to inaugurate a new embassy.

== See also ==
- Foreign relations of Israel
- Foreign relations of Turkmenistan
