= Women's Union of Turkmenistan =

Political party in Turkmenistan

- Türkmenistanyň zenanlar birleşigi
- Abbreviation: TZB
- Founded: 7 April 1994; 32 years ago
- Founder: Abat Ryzaýewa
- Purpose: Women's rights Feminism; Statism
- Region served: Turkmenistan
- Chairperson: Gurbangul Ataýewa
- Website: zenan.gov.tm

The Women's Union of Turkmenistan (TZB; Turkmen: Türkmenistanyň zenanlar birleşigi) is a mass women's organisation in Turkmenistan. For a long time, Women's Union was the only women organization permitted in the country. Advocating for women's rights, this organization appeared as a non-governmental organization, but in reality, Women's Union was closely linked and controlled by the government.

Until the death of the first president of Turkmenistan, Saparmurat Niyazov, the Women's Union of Turkmenistan bore the name of Saparmurat Niyazov's mother, Gurbansoltan Eje, who, during the reign of Niyazov, was considered the national heroine of Turkmenistan, a number of objects were named after her, such as streets, other geographical objects (for example, the city of Gurbansoltan eje), the order of the same name, the name of the month April in the Turkmen calendar. Imitating the practice found in many communist states (for example Socialist Women's Union and DFRF in North Korea), Women's Union is a member of Movement for National Revival (Galkynysh), which was also controlled by Niyazov.

During existence of the original People's Council, Women's Union was also represented in the council. This practice was discontinued with elimination of the council in 2008. However, following the results of the 2013 parliamentary election, the organization, like other parties and organizations (excluding the Democratic Party of Turkmenistan, which has dominated the country since 1991), entered the Mejlis of Turkmenistan for the first time (16 out of 125 seats in the Mejlis) and remained until the 2018 election.
