= Rejepow =

Rejepow (masculine) or Rejepowa (feminine) is a Turkmen surname. Notable people with the surname include:

- Akmyrat Rejepow, Turkmen general
- Guwanç Rejepow (born 1982), Turkmen footballer
- Maýsa Rejepowa (born 1993), Turkmen sprinter
- Rejepbaý Rejepow (born 1992), Turkmen weightlifter
