= Tatyana Mollayeva =

Medical researcher

Academic background
- Education: MD, I.M. Sechenov First Moscow State Medical University
- Alma mater: PhD, Rehabilitation Science and Neuroscience, University of Toronto

Tatyana Mollayeva is a scientist at KITE, Toronto Rehabilitation Sciences Institute, University Health Network, and a Professor at the Dalla Lana School of Public Health with cross appointments at the Rehabilitation Sciences Institute and the Occupational Science & Therapy of the Temerty Faculty of Medicine at the University of Toronto.

Mollayeva is a Senior Atlantic Fellow for Equity in Brain Health with the Global Brain Health Institute and holds a Canada Research Chair in Neurological Disorders and Brain Health.

Mollayeva's research focuses on the prevention and management of neurological diseases and injuries, including traumatic brain injury, sleep disorders, dementia, and neurodegenerative disorders. She also researches the role of sex and other characteristics in shaping health outcomes.

== Career ==
Tatyana Mollayeva earned her medical degree in Preventive Medicine from the I.M. Sechenov First Moscow State Medical University. She completed her residency in Epidemiology and Public Health at Turkmen State Medical University. She later obtained her PhD from the University of Toronto’s Rehabilitation Sciences Institute, along with the Collaborative Program in Neuroscience. She is a Global Atlantic Fellow for Equity in Brain Health with the Global Brain Health Institute. She trained at Trinity College Dublin and the University of California, San Francisco.

Mollayeva's research aims to understand the factors influencing complex neurological disorders and injuries.

== Honours & awards ==
- 2019 | First Robert D. Voogt NABIS Founders Award – The North American Brain Injury Society
- 2018 | Elite Reviewer - Archives of Physical Medicine & Rehabilitation
- 2017 | Elio Lugaresi Award for Education - World Sleep Society
- 2015 | Deborah Wilkerson Early Career Award - American Congress of Rehabilitation Medicine, USA
