= Batyrov =

Batyrov or Batyrow (Russian: Батыров) is a Turkic masculine surname, its feminine counterpart is Batyrova or Batyrowa. Notable people with the surname include:

- Albert Batyrov (born 1981), Belarusian wrestler
- Banat Batyrova (1904–1970), Russian farmer
- Gurbangeldi Batyrow (born 1988), Turkmen football player
- Saparmyrat Batyrow (born 1954), Turkmen Minister of Textile Industry
- Shadzha Batyrov (1908–1965), General Secretary of the Communist Party of Turkmenistan
