= 1999 Turkmen parliamentary election =

← 1994	12 December 1999	2004 →
- All 50 seats in the Assembly; 26 seats needed for a majority
- Turnout: 99.59%
Party	Leader	Vote %	Seats	+/–
TDP	Saparmurat Niyazov	100	50	0
This lists parties that won seats. See the complete results below.

Parliamentary elections were held in Turkmenistan on 12 December 1999. All 50 seats were won by the Democratic Party of Turkmenistan, which remained the sole legal party.

== Campaign ==
In contrast to the 1994 election where all the seats were won uncontested, 104 candidates — all from the Democratic Party of Turkmenistan, the only legal party in the state — fought for 50 seats.

== Conduct ==
The Organization for Security and Co-operation in Europe declined to send observers in light of the brazen totalitarian regime in place.

Voting took place between 08:00 and 18:00. Voter turnout was on a par with other elections.

== Results ==
Party	Votes	%	Seats	+/–
Democratic Party of Turkmenistan			50	0
Total			50	0
Total votes	2,224,537	–		
Registered voters/turnout	2,233,631	99.59		
Source: Nohlen et al.

== Aftermath ==
The inaugural session was held on 7 January December. Niyazov returned as the Prime Minister, as did Muradov as the Chairman. Shortly, the Assembly would declare Saparmurat Niyazov as the President for Life.
