= 2008–09 Turkmen parliamentary election =

- 14 December 2008
- All 125 seats in the Assembly; 63 seats needed for a majority
- Turnout: 93.87%

Parliamentary elections were held in Turkmenistan on 14 December 2008, with a second round held in one constituency on 28 December 2008 and a revote in one constituency on 8 February 2009. The number of assembly members was increased from 65 to 125 (while the People's Council was abolished) in constitutional reforms enacted on 26 September 2008. It was the first election since Turkmenistan's independence in which, theoretically, parties other than the Democratic Party of Turkmenistan are allowed to take part since the constitution no longer defined Turkmenistan as a one-party state. However, no legal opposition parties had been set up and the fact that the election took place in single-seat constituencies greatly diminished the opposition's chance of gaining parliamentary representation.

== Background ==
About 90% of the 288 candidates for the 125 seats were members of the Democratic Party of Turkmenistan (DPT), and 10% are of affiliated organisations or weak "initiative groups". However, all of the candidates expressed much support for the current President, Gurbanguly Berdimuhamedow. Ethnic minorities, including the sizable Uzbek minority, were not allowed to field candidates, and many members of the opposition remained in exile. In addition, irregularities occurred when opposition candidates registered to become candidates, and others had passports confiscated. Human Rights Watch said of the election, "The conditions are not in place to hold a free and fair election that would be a meaningful reflection of the will of the people," but also mentioned that there has been "some progress". Turkmen citizens also noted that there was little, if any information regarding the candidates up for election available.

The election was also the first in which expatriates could vote. Polling stations were set up at Turkmenistan's 27 diplomatic missions, including those in Vienna, Berlin, Paris, Brussels, Moscow, and London.

== Conduct ==
"The parliamentary elections were well-organized, competitive and free. They were held in compliance with election legislation in effect in the country and generally recognized norms of democratic elections, and were marked by high voter turnout."

— Sergei Lebedev, head of the CIS election observation team

"I didn't vote... Why vote if the electoral commission members are going to do it instead of us?"

— A man from Ahal Province

A small, nine-member team from the Organization for Security and Co-operation in Europe (OSCE) observed the elections, as well as small teams from the United Nations and the Commonwealth of Independent States (CIS), the first time international observers were allowed to view the election. According to the Central Election Commission of Turkmenistan, 2.59 million people, which is a turnout of 93.87%, cast ballots at 2,118 polling locations in 125 constituencies. However, some opposition and human rights groups suggested that the turnout may have been lower than 30%. After the elections, the head of the CIS observation team said that voting was "in line with the requirements of the local legislation and international norms of elections". Ultimately OSCE chose not to monitor the elections, since the country's laws did not allow genuine competition. Human Rights Watch was also critical of the vote, for the same reason.

Some residents reported being pressured to vote, or for whom to vote. There were also other issues, such as the use of pencils to mark votes, allowing single members of a family to vote for everyone else in the family, and that some people voted without needing to provide any identification documents.

== Results ==
There were 13 seats up for election in Ashgabat, 19 seats in Ahal Province, 11 in Balkan Province, 26 in Daşoguz Province, 26 in Lebap Province, and 28 in Mary Province. Two or more candidates competed in each constituency, and candidates needed to win 50% of the vote in order to secure the seat. Runoffs were held on 28 December 2008, and a revote was held in one seat on 8 February 2009.

A list of 123 winners were announced on 22 December 2008. However, the party affiliation of the candidates was not listed.
