= Ashgabat Trauma Center =

Ashgabat Trauma Centre

Geography
- Location: Ashgabat, Turkmenistan
- Coordinates: 37.9510°N 58.3397°E

Organisation
- Type: clinic
- Affiliated university: Turkmen State Medical University

Services
- Beds: 180

History
- Founded: 2011

The Ashgabat Trauma Center (Turkmen: Şikesleri bejeriş halkara merkezi) is a large orthopedic center in the south-western part of Ashgabat, the capital of Turkmenistan. It opened on July 21, 2011, and is a 10-story white marble building. It is the training base for the Faculty of Military Surgery and Traumatology of the Turkmen State Medical University and the city of Ashgabat Indira Gandhi Medical College.
