= 2012 Turkmenistan presidential election =

- 12 February 2012
- Registered: 2,987,324
- Turnout: 96.70%
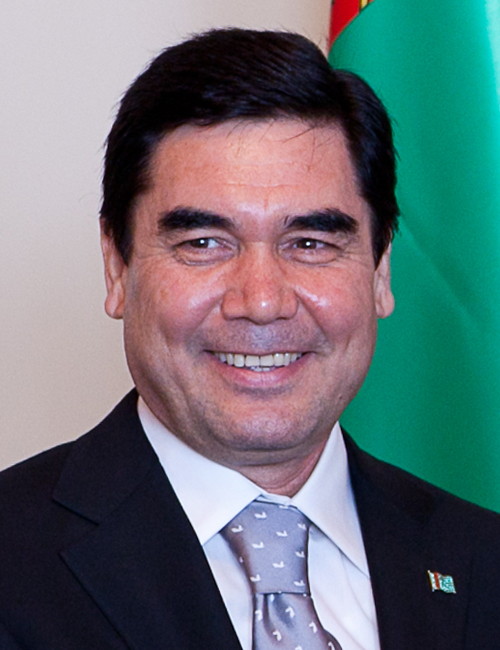

Nominee	Gurbanguly Berdimuhamedow	Annageldi Ýazmyradow
Party	TDP	TDP
Popular vote	2,806,265
Percentage	97.14%	1.07%
- Results by region
President before election
Gurbanguly Berdimuhamedow
TDP
Elected President
Gurbanguly Berdimuhamedow
TDP

Presidential elections were held in Turkmenistan on 12 February 2012. They were Turkmenistan's fourth presidential elections and decided who would be the country's president for the next five years. Gurbanguly Berdimuhamedow won with 97% of the vote.

== Candidates ==
=== Official ===
1. Gurbanguly Berdimuhamedow, incumbent President of Turkmenistan
2. Rejep Bazarow, deputy head of the Daşoguz Province
3. Kakageldi Abdullaýew, Governor of the Türkmenbaşy District
4. Gurbanmämmet Mollaniýazow, manager of Türkmennebit
5. Annageldi Orazberdiýewiç Ýazmyradow, Water Minister
6. Esendurdy Gaýypow, head of Lebapgurluşyk production association
7. Saparmyrat Batyrow, director of the Gökdepe textile mill
8. Ýarmuhammet Orazgulyýew, Deputy Energy and Industry Minister

All of them are members of Turkmenistan's only political party, the Democratic Party of Turkmenistan.

=== Declared interest ===
1. Nurmuhammet Hanamow, leader of the exiled Republican Party of Turkmenistan

=== Denied ===
1. Aina Abayeva, English teacher nominated by the Civil Society Movement. Her request to participate was rejected because the organisation that nominated her was an unregistered NGO. Its lack of legal status meant that it did not have the authority to make such a nomination.

== Campaign ==
Campaigning started in October 2011. During the campaign many of the candidates running against the incumbent president expressed their support for him, thus giving rise to suspicions that his victory was more or less guaranteed. According to an expert from the Chatham House, "the vote [was] a democratic sham" and an example of "faux democracy".

== Results ==
Candidate	Party	Votes	%
Gurbanguly Berdimuhamedow	Democratic Party	2,806,265	97.14
Annageldi Ýazmyradow	Democratic Party		1.07
Ýarmuhammet Orazgulyýew	Democratic Party		1.02
Rejep Bazarow	Democratic Party		0.28
Saparmyrat Batyrow	Democratic Party		0.19
Kakageldi Abdullaýew	Democratic Party		0.16
Gurbanmämmet Mollaniýazow	Democratic Party		0.08
Esendurdy Gaýypow	Democratic Party		0.06
Total			
Total votes		2,888,887	–
Registered voters/turnout		2,987,324	96.70
Source: Tass, Turkmenistan Info
