= 2004 Turkmen parliamentary election =

← 1999	19 December 2004	2008–09 →
- All 50 seats in the Assembly; 26 seats needed for a majority
- Turnout: 76.88%
Party	Leader	Vote %	Seats	+/–
TDP	Saparmurat Niyazov	100	50	0
This lists parties that won seats. See the complete results below.

Parliamentary elections were held in Turkmenistan on 19 December 2004, with a second round in seven constituencies on 9 January 2005. A total of 131 candidates contested the 50 seats, all of whom were members of the Democratic Party of Turkmenistan, the country's sole legal party. Voter turnout was reported to be 76.88%, although in Ashgabat the low turnout prompted election officials to take the ballot boxes to people's houses.

== Results ==
Party	Votes	%	Seats	+/–
Democratic Party of Turkmenistan			50	0
Total			50	0
Total votes	1,915,000	–		
Registered voters/turnout		76.88		
Source: IPU
