= Kasymguly Babaýew =

Turkmen politician (born 1966)

3rd Chairman of the Democratic Party of Turkmenistan
- In office 18 August 2013 – 2 April 2018
- Preceded by: Gurbanguly Berdimuhamedow
- Succeeded by: Ata Serdarow

Personal details
- Born: Kasymguly Gulmyradowiç Babaýew; 12 September 1966 (age 59) Gämi, Turkmen SSR, Soviet Union
- Party: Democratic Party of Turkmenistan
- Children: 4
- Education: Turkmen State Institute of Economics and Management
- Profession: Economist

Kasymguly Gulmyradovych Babayev (Turkmen: Kasymguly Gulmyradowiç Babaýew) is a Turkmen political figure and economist.

== Biography ==
=== Childhood ===
Kasymguly Babayev was born 12 September 1966 in the village Gämi of present-day Ahal Province. From 1973 to 1983 Babayev studied in Secondary School No. 1 of Anau. Between 1983 and 1989 he studied at the Turkmen State Institute of Economics and Management, and received a degree in economics.

=== Professional career ===
From 1984 to 1986 Babayev served in the army. From 1989 to 1991 he worked as an economist at the Labor Research Institute of the Turkmenistan State Committee for Labor and Social Security of the USSR. Between 1991 and 1993 he taught at the department of management and international economic relations of Turkmen State Institute of Economy and Management, and between 1993 and 1996 at the department of world economy and international economic relations. Simultaneously, in September 1991 he was appointed deputy dean of the faculty of commerce and technology, and in September 1992 deputy dean of the faculty of trade and international economic relations.

Babayev entered postgraduate studies in 1993. From 1996 to 2002 he taught at the Department of World Economy and International Economic Relations of Turkmen State University. In 2002 he became a senior lecturer in the Department of World Experience Studies of the same university. At the same time he served as a deputy dean of the Faculty of Law and International Relations from January 2000 and as a Dean of the Faculty of Law and International Relations of Turkmen State University from September of the same year till February 2007.

Babayev was elected to the Mejlis in 2004. In 2007 Babayev was elected deputy speaker of the Mejlis, serving until 2012. From June 2008, he was also first deputy chairman of the "Galkynyş" All-National Movement and first secretary of the political bureau of the Democratic Party of Turkmenistan. From 2013 until 2 April 2018, he was chairman of the Democratic Party of Turkmenistan. Babayev served again as deputy speaker of the Mejlis from 2018 until 15 April 2021, when he was formally relieved of that position.

From 2021 to 2023 Babayev served as deputy chairman of the People's Council, at the time the upper chamber of a bicameral parliament. Upon dissolution of the National Council and reformation of the People's Council in 2023, Babayev became chief of staff of the People's Council.

== Criticism ==
Opposition media have alleged that Babayev in his official positions has done very little work and has used his position "to resolve personal problems."

== Awards ==
- Watana bolan söýgüsi üçin "For the love of the Fatherland" (2010)
- Türkmenistanyň Garaşsyzlygynyň 20 ýyllygyna "20 years of Turkmenistan's Independence" (2011)
- Magtymguly Pyragy (2014)
- Garaşsyz, Baky Bitarap Türkmenistan "Independent, Eternally Neutral Turkmenistan" (2015)
- Türkmenistanyň Garaşsyzlygynyň 25 ýyllygyna "25 years of Turkmenistan's Independence" (2016)
- commemorative medal in honor of the 26th anniversary of Turkmenistan's independence (2017)

== Personal life ==
Babayev is married and has four children.
