= List of diplomatic missions of Turkmenistan =

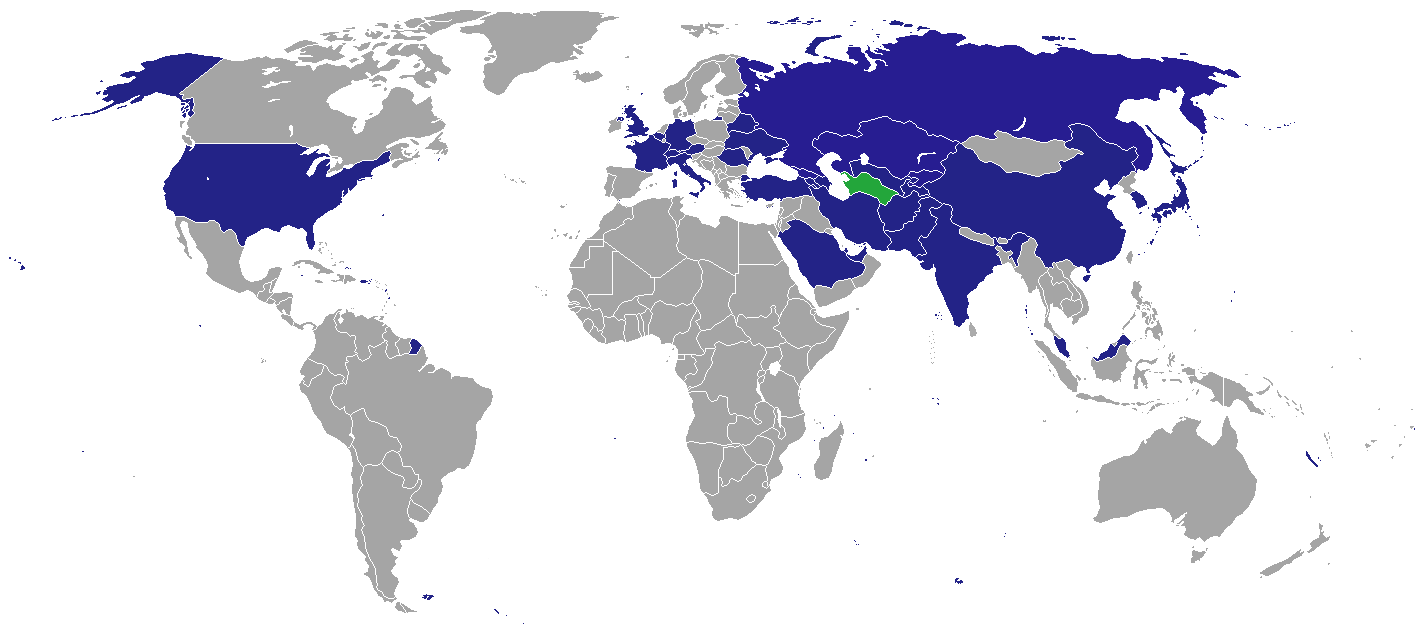
Diplomatic missions of Turkmenistan

This is a list of diplomatic missions of Turkmenistan. The country has established diplomatic relations with 151 states.

Honorary consulates and trade offices are excluded from this listing.

== Americas ==
- United States
  - Washington, D.C. (Embassy) (Note: Also accredited to Canada and Mexico.)

== Asia ==
- Afghanistan
  - Kabul (Embassy)
  - Mazar-i-Sharif (Consulate-General)
  - Herat (Consulate-General)
- Armenia
  - Yerevan (Embassy) (Note: Also accredited to Lebanon.)
- Azerbaijan
  - Baku (Embassy)
- China
  - Beijing (Embassy) (Note: Also accredited to Mongolia, North Korea, and Vietnam.)
- Georgia
  - Tbilisi (Embassy)
- India
  - New Delhi (Embassy) (Note: Also accredited to Nepal and Sri Lanka.)
- Iran
  - Tehran (Embassy)
  - Mashhad (Consulate-General)
- Japan
  - Tokyo (Embassy) (Note: Also accredited to Australia, New Zealand, and the Philippines.)
- Kazakhstan
  - Astana (Embassy) (Note: Also accredited to South Africa.)
  - Aktau (Consulate)
  - Almaty (Consular section)
- Kyrgyzstan
  - Bishkek (Embassy)
- Malaysia
  - Kuala Lumpur (Embassy) (Note: Also accredited to Brunei, Cambodia, Indonesia, and Thailand.)
- Pakistan
  - Islamabad (Embassy)
- Qatar
  - Doha (Embassy)
- Saudi Arabia
  - Riyadh (Embassy) (Note: Also accredited to Bahrain, Egypt, Jordan, Oman, and Palestine.)
- South Korea
  - Seoul (Embassy) (Note: Also accredited to Singapore.)
- Tajikistan
  - Dushanbe (Embassy)
- Turkey
  - Ankara (Embassy) (Note: Also accredited to Morocco and Tunisia.)
  - Istanbul (Consulate-General)
- United Arab Emirates
  - Abu Dhabi (Embassy) (Note: Also accredited to Iraq and Kuwait.)
  - Dubai (Consulate-General)
- Uzbekistan
  - Tashkent (Embassy)

== Europe ==
- Austria
  - Vienna (Embassy) (Note: Also accredited to Czechia, Hungary, Slovakia, and United Nations.)
- Belarus
  - Minsk (Embassy) (Note: Also accredited to Estonia, Latvia, and Lithuania.)
- Belgium
  - Brussels (Embassy) (Note: Also accredited to Luxembourg and the Organisation for the Prohibition of Chemical Weapons.)
- France
  - Paris (Embassy) (Note: Also accredited to Monaco, Portugal, and UNESCO.)
- Germany
  - Berlin (Embassy) (Note: Also accredited to Denmark, Poland, and Spain.)
  - Frankfurt (Consulate)
- Italy
  - Rome (Embassy) (Note: Also accredited to Cyprus, Greece, and Israel.)
- Romania
  - Bucharest (Embassy) (Note: Also accredited to Croatia.)
- Russia
  - Moscow (Embassy) (Note: Also accredited to Bulgaria, Serbia, and Slovenia.)
  - Kazan (Consulate-General)
  - Astrakhan (Consulate)
- Ukraine
  - Kyiv (Embassy) (Note: Also accredited to Moldova.)
- United Kingdom
  - London (Embassy) (Note: Also accredited to Finland, Norway, and Sweden.)

== Multilateral Organizations ==
- United Nations
  - New York City (Permanent Mission) (Note: Also accredited to Brazil, Cuba, & Guatemala.)
  - Geneva (Permanent Mission) (Note: Also accredited to the Holy See and Switzerland.)

== Missions to open ==
- Israel
  - Tel Aviv (Embassy)
- Hungary
  - Budapest (Embassy)

== Gallery ==
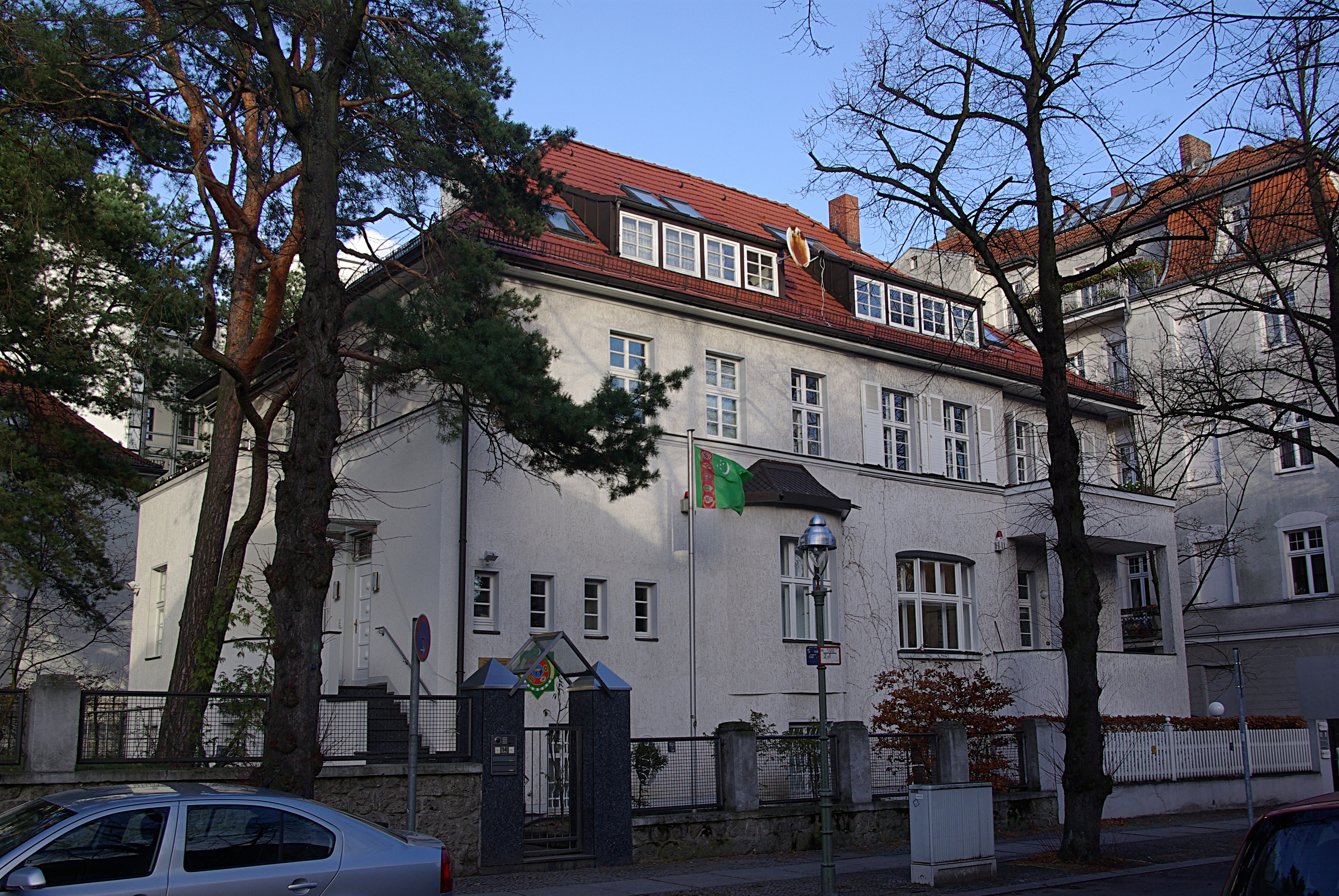
Embassy in Berlin

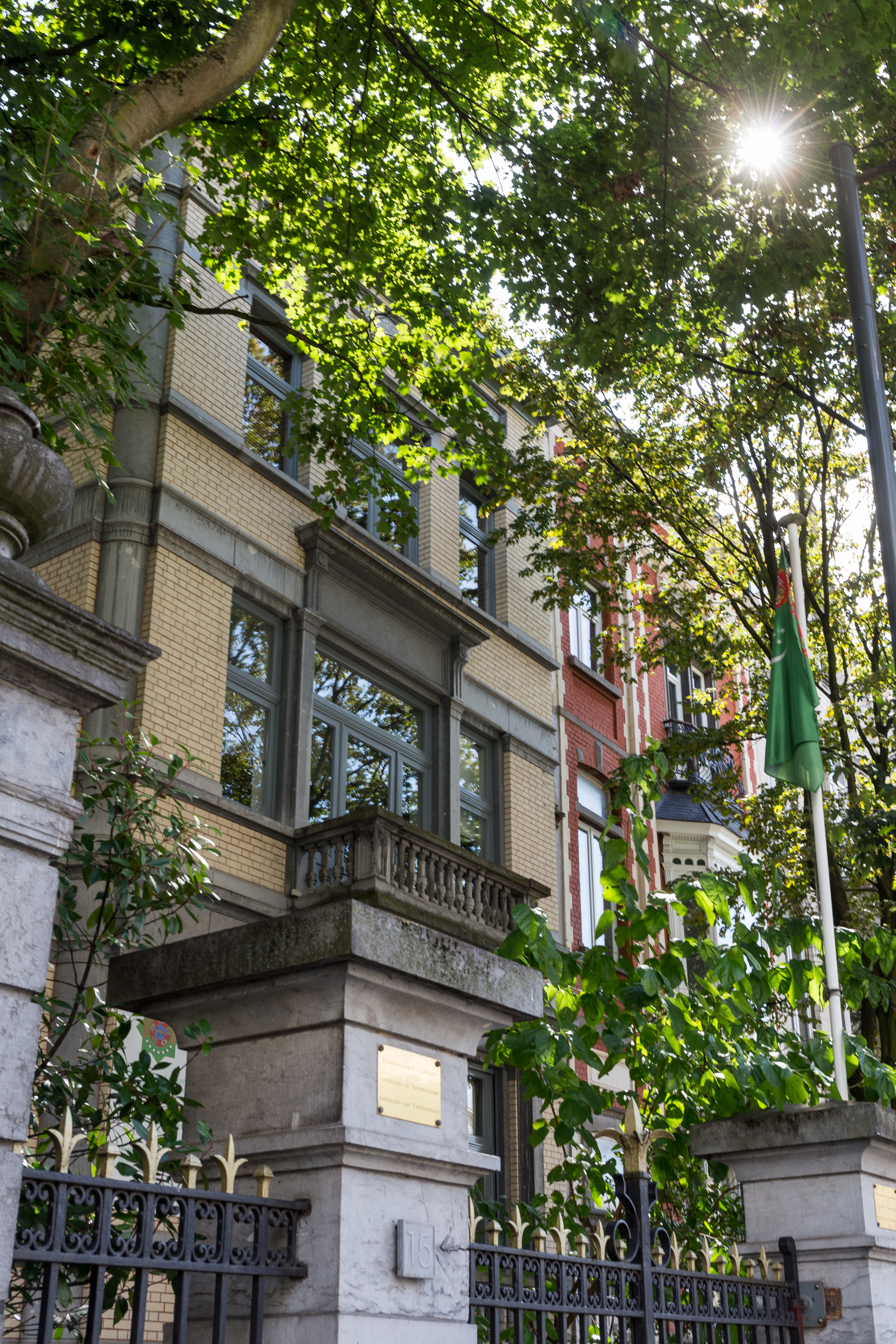
Embassy in Brussels

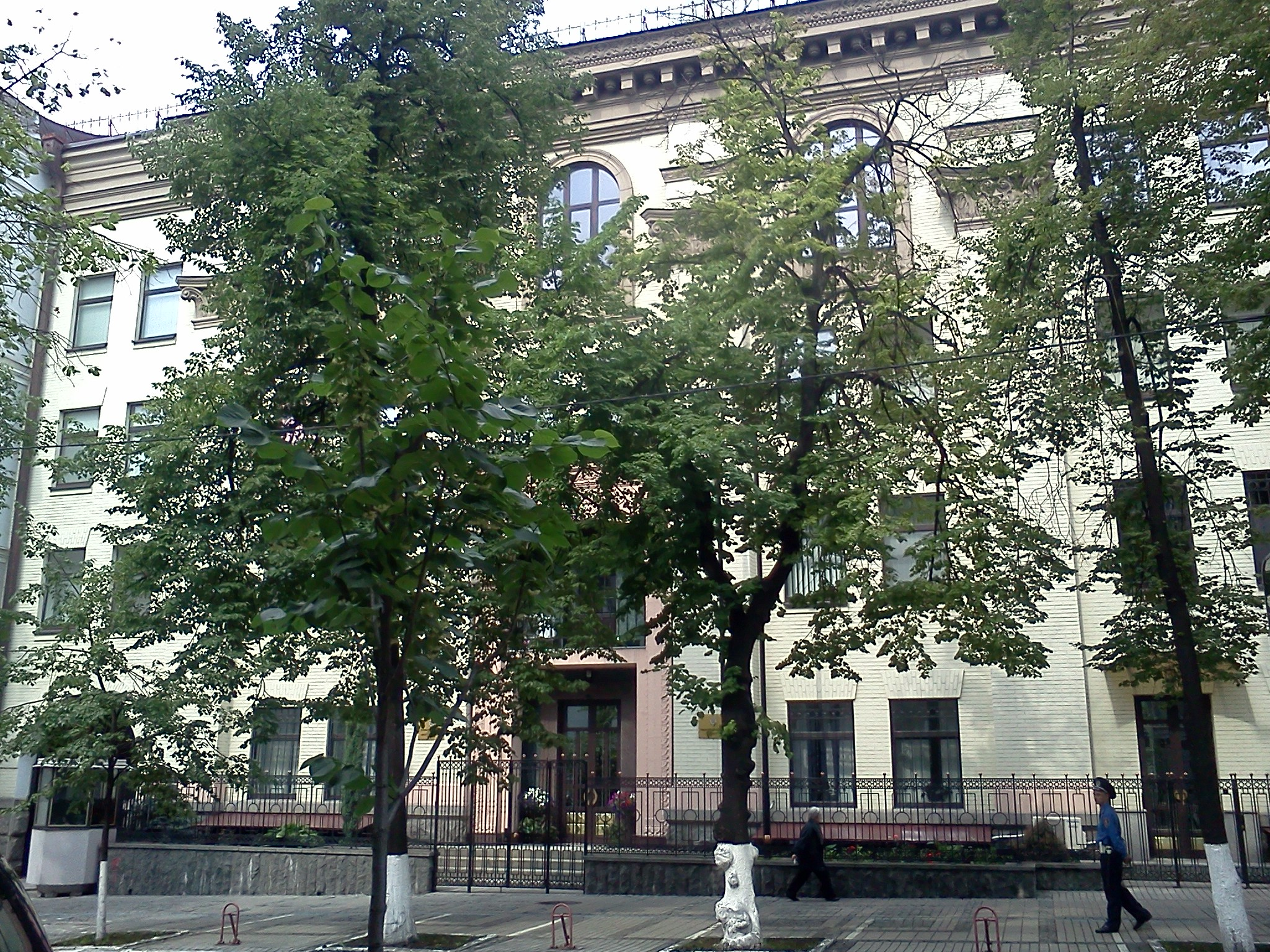
Embassy in Kyiv

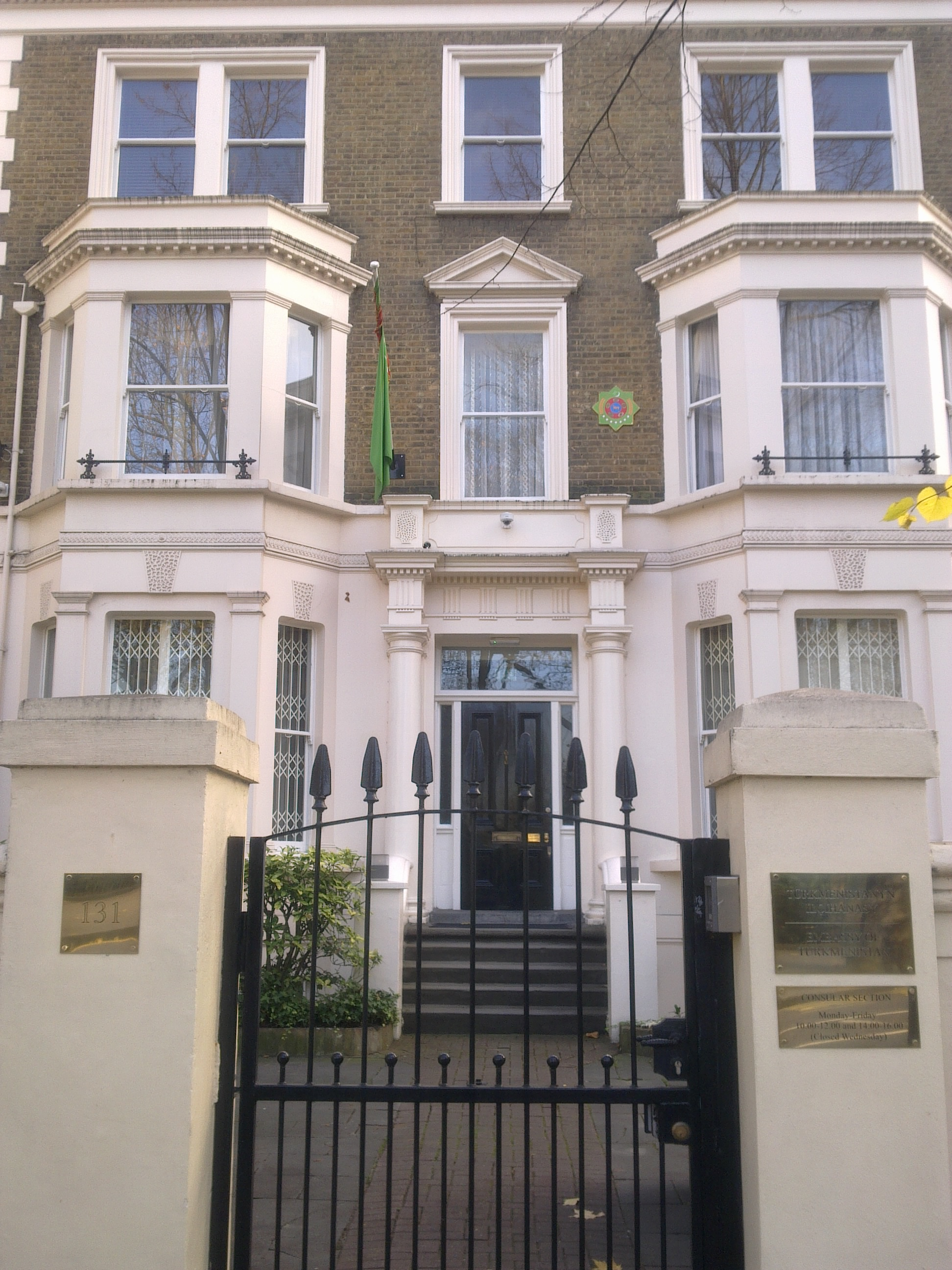
Embassy in London

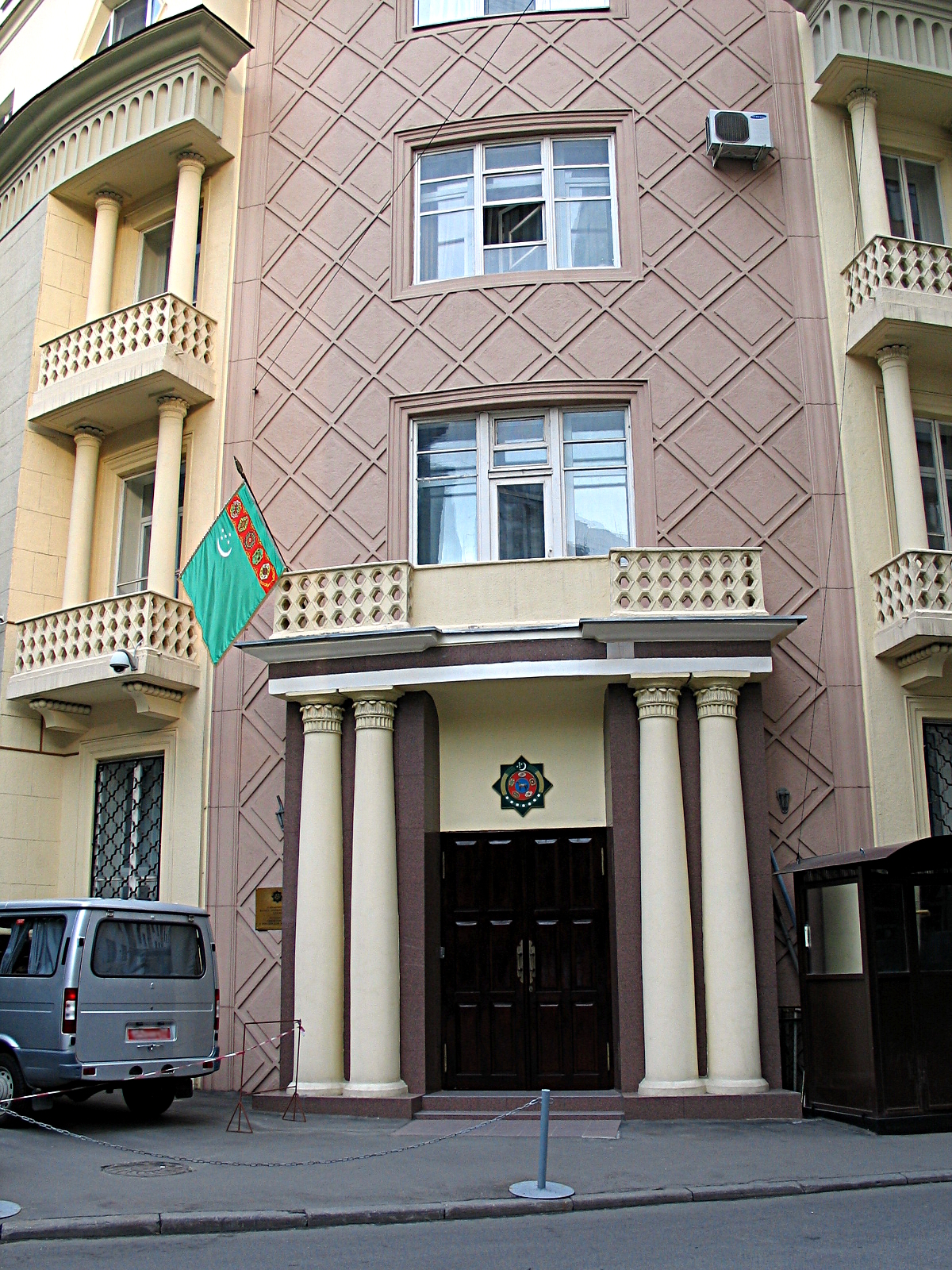
Embassy in Moscow

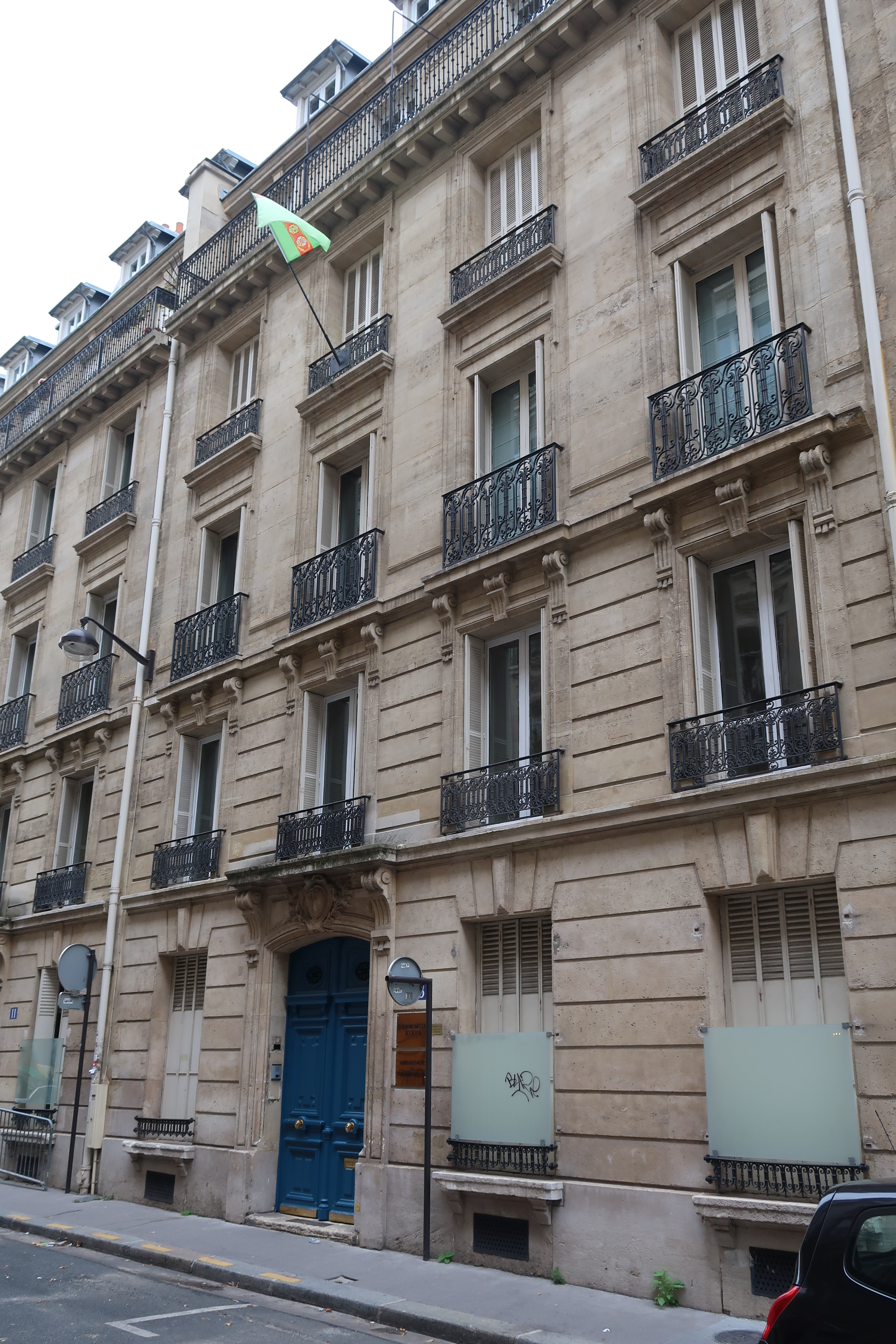
Embassy in Paris

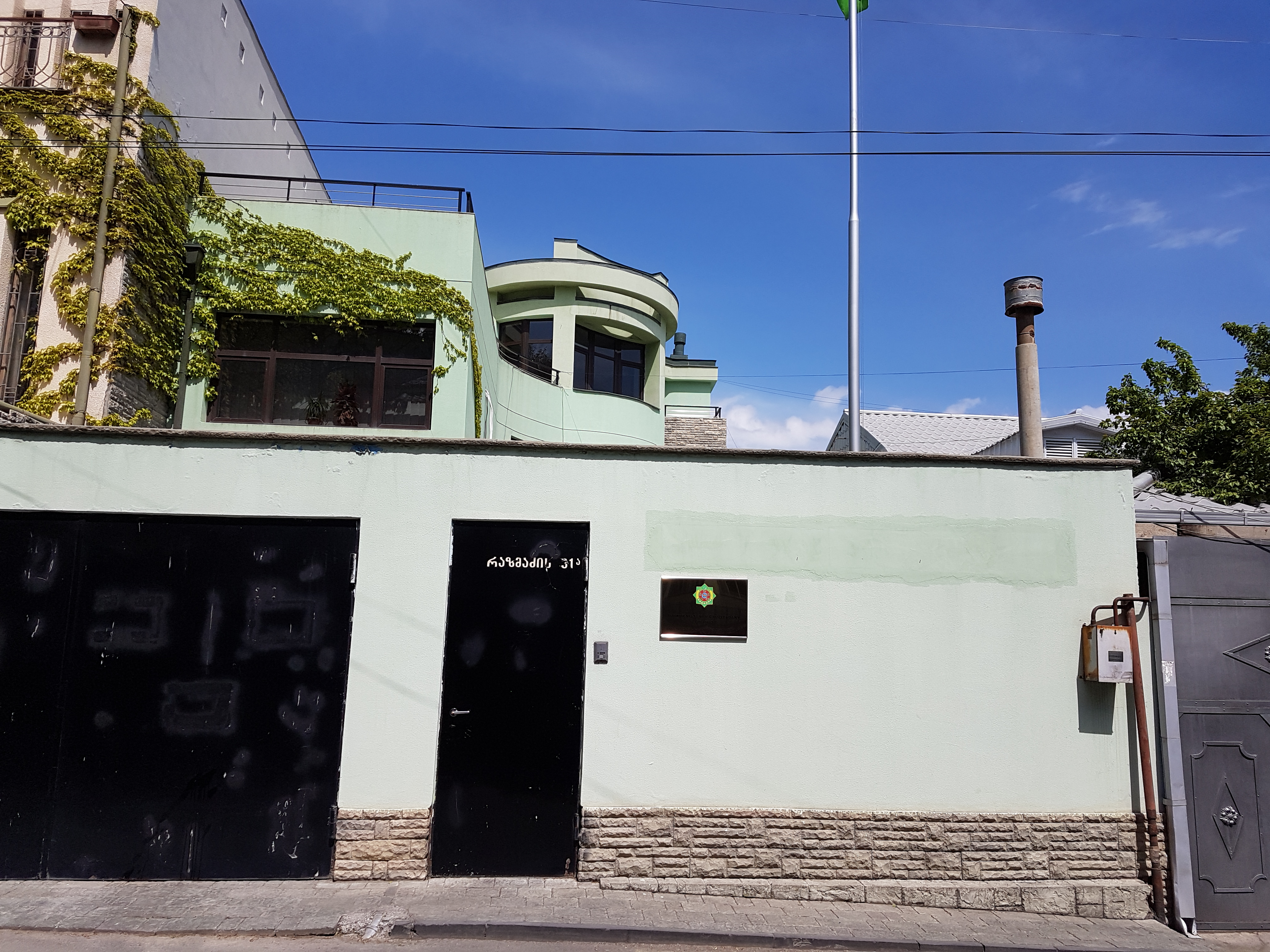
Embassy in Tbilisi

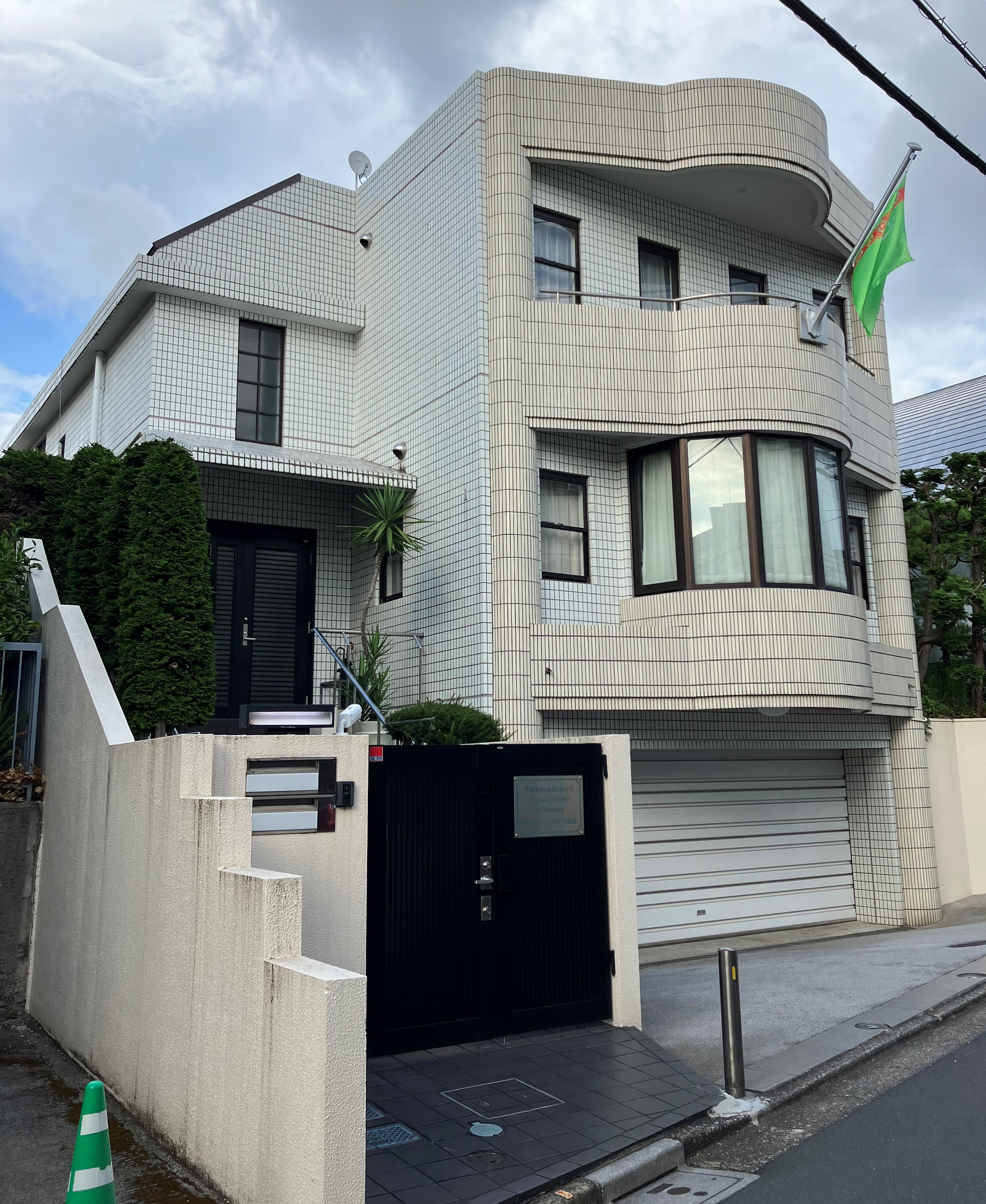
Embassy in Tokyo

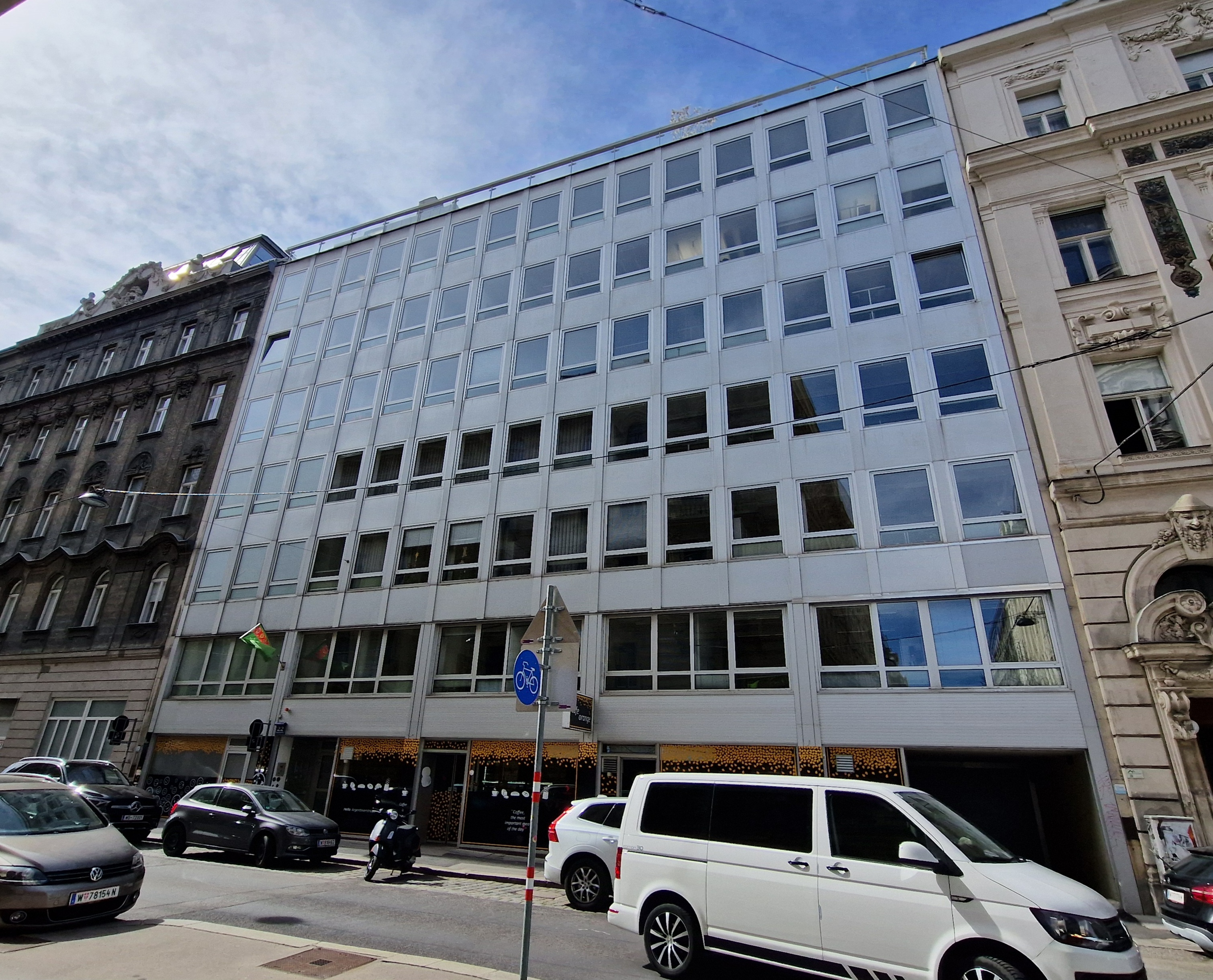
Embassy in Vienna

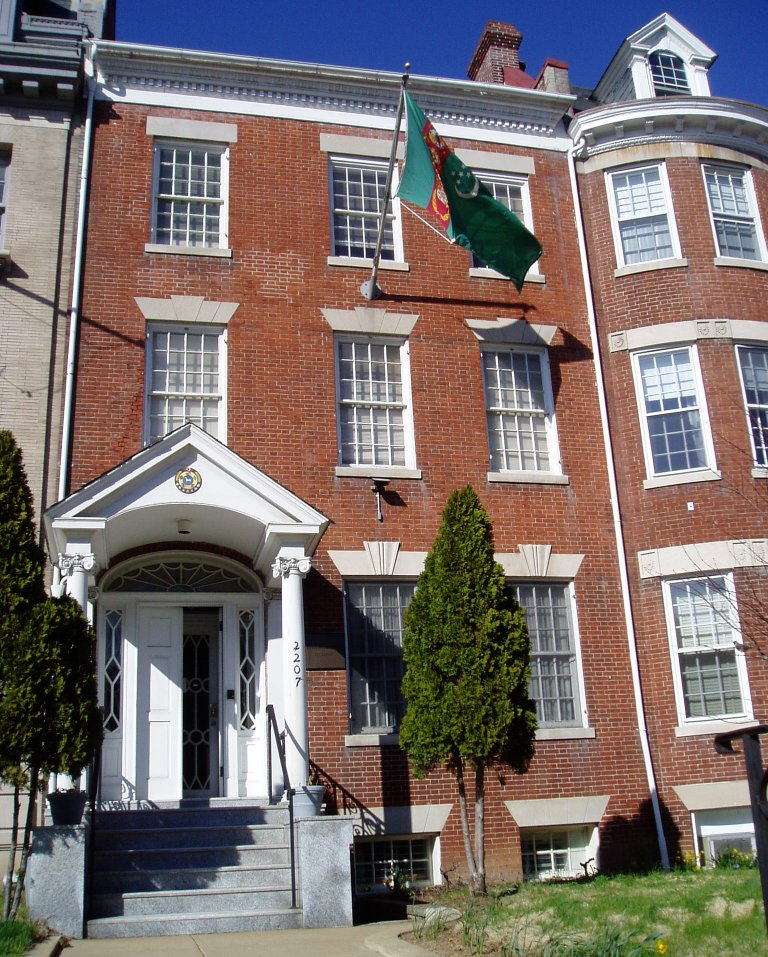
Embassy in Washington, D.C.
