= Saparmyrat Batyrow =

Turkmen politician

Saparmyrat Batyrow (born 1954; also known as Saparmyrat Batyrov or Saparmurat Batyrov) is the Turkmen Minister of Textile Industry.

Batyrow was a presidential candidate in the 2012 Turkmenistani presidential election, in which he received 0.19% of the votes. He served in the army from 1973 to 1975. Since 2010, he has been director of the Geoktepe cotton spinning factory, a part of the Ministry of Textile Industry of Turkmenistan. In the past, he has held various appointments, mainly in the Textile Ministry.

Batyrow was awarded the Turkmenistanyn Garassyzlygynyn 20 yyllygyna Jubilee Medal (20th Anniversary Jubilee Medal of Turkmen Independence), and is married with 5 children.
