= 1994 Turkmen parliamentary election =

- 11 December 1994
- All 50 seats in the Assembly; 26 seats needed for a majority
- Turnout: 99.77%
Party	Leader	Vote %	Seats
TDP	Saparmurat Niyazov	100	50
This lists parties that won seats. See the complete results below.

Parliamentary elections were held in Turkmenistan on 11 December 1994, the first since independence. All 50 seats were won by the former Communist Party, which had rebranded as the Democratic Party of Turkmenistan and remained the sole legal party.

== Background ==
On 27 October 1991 Turkmenistan became the last Central Asian Republic to declare independence from the Soviet Union. Shortly afterwards, the Communist Party of Turkmenistan rebranded itself as the Democratic Party of Turkmenistan (DPK). This change had little practical connotations, as Gorbachev's reforms towards a more democratic polity had failed to penetrate into Turkmenistan and Turkmen president Saparmurat Niyazov chose to maintain his iron-grip following independence. Niyazov is noted to have said "We did not smash the former power structures all at once, which could have created a power vacuum and led to disturbances. We chose the path of steady, gradual transformation [...] Moreover, our government has resolutely suppressed attempts to pursue destructive notions on the crest of the wave of pseudo-reform and Glasnost." Under the new constitution, Turkmenistan was to have a presidential system of government and Niyazov took over the role. On 15 January 1994 a referendum was held on the prolongation of President Niyazov's term of office until 2002, with a claimed 99.99% of voters voting in support.

== Electoral system ==
Following the promulgation of the new constitution, the Supreme Soviet was replaced with a Parliament (Mejlis), with the number of seats reduced from 175 to 50. A People's Council (Halk Malshaty) was also created, which consisted of the president, members of the Mejlis, 60 People's Advisors (Khalk Vekilleri) elected from each administrative district (Etrap), the Chair of the Supreme Court, Council of Ministers, and other high-ranking officials of the judicial branch and the state administration. The highest representative body, it was set to convene once a year. A new electoral law was adopted on 13 May 1994 without any significant deviations from the Soviet precedent. Universal suffrage was guaranteed to all citizens above 18 years provided they were not serving a prison-term or were of unsound mind. Any political party or a social organization or a group with over 200 registered members was allowed to nominate candidates, as long as they were above 25 years of age and possessed unconditional devotion to Turkmenistan.

A 23-member Central Election Commission (CEC) was tasked with overseeing the elections, with help from subordinate commissions. A two-round system was decided to be used. To indicate support, voters had to leave the names untouched; else, they had to strike them off. On a successful election, the candidate had to give up government appointments.

== Candidates ==
In reality, Turkmenistan had no other party apart from DPK; Niyazov attempted to open a "Peasant's Party" — as propaganda — whose failure was exhibited by the state as the reluctance of Turkmens to have a multi-party state. Only 54 candidates were proposed for the 50 constituencies — all other candidates withdrew or were disqualified. Of these, three failed to register and one backed out after registration. Thus, 50 candidates ran for 50 seats; 45 men and five women. 21 were aged between 31 and 40 years, 22 between 41 and 50 years, and the rest were older. 45 were Turkmen, 2 Russian, and 3 Uzbek.

=== Campaign ===
Posters with pictures and short biographs were plastered across prominent venues — expenses were borne by the Election Commission. The local commissions arranged for face-to-face meetings with constituents. These meetings would be discussed in local newspapers, and the candidates effusively praised; particular emphasis was given on how they enjoyed "unanimous support".

== Conduct ==
The elections took place on 11 December from 08:00 to 18:00. Multiple poling stations were set up in each electoral district. The ballots were printed in Turkmen and Russian, including the name of the candidate, profession, place of work, and residence address. The Organization for Security and Co-operation in Europe requested to send observers but no response was received from the Turkmen government. However, observers from Commission on Security and Cooperation in Europe and US Embassy diplomats were allowed.

== Results ==
Official statistics record a 99.77% voter turnout, at par with other elections. 78 votes (0.0039%) were struck off as invalid.

Party	Votes	%	Seats
Democratic Party of Turkmenistan	2,008,701	100.00	50
Total	2,008,701	100.00	50
Valid votes	2,008,701	100.00	
Invalid/blank votes	78	0.00	
Total votes	2,008,779	100.00	
Registered voters/turnout	2,013,423	99.77	
Source: Nohlen et al.

== Aftermath ==
The inaugural session of the newly elected parliament was held on 26 December. Sakhat Muradov was reappointed as chairman.
