= Magtymguly Youth Organisation of Turkmenistan =

Political party in Turkmenistan

Magtymguly Youth Organisation of Turkmenistan Türkmenistanyň Magtymguly adyndaky Ýaşlar guramasy
- Chairperson: Yazmukhammet Öwezberdiýew
- Founded: 16 November 1991; 34 years ago
- Headquarters: Ashgabat, Garaşsyzlyk St. 104. 744000
- Membership: 909,765 (2016)
- Ideology: Statism; Nationalism; Youth interests
- Position: Catch-all
- Colours: Green; Red
- Mother party: Democratic Party of Turkmenistan
- Newspaper: Ýaşlar
- Website: yashlar.gov.tm

The Magtymguly Youth Organisation of Turkmenistan (Turkmen: Türkmenistanyň Magtymguly adyndaky Ýaşlar guramasy) is a registered social and political organization in Turkmenistan. It held seats in the Mejilis of Turkmenistan of the sixth convocation (2013–2018). Despite this organization having the appearance of a non-governmental organization, in reality, Magtymguly Youth Organisation was closely linked and controlled by the government.

This organization is named after the famous Turkmen poet and philosopher Magtymguly Pyragy, and was founded in November 1991 as a continuation of Turkmen branch of the Komsomol. The organization holds various cultural events, scientific and practical conferences, as well as thematic meetings, seminars among student youth, rural youth, including those with the participation of persons with disabilities. During the Niyazov era, the organization is a part of the Movement for National Revival (Galkynysh), which was also controlled by Niyazov.

Following the results of the 2013 parliamentary elections, the organization, like other parties and organizations (excluding the Democratic Party of Turkmenistan, which has dominated the country since 1991), entered the Mejlis of Turkmenistan for the first time.
