= Turkmen State Medical University =

Turkmen medical university

Coordinates: 37°52′42″N 58°21′59″E

Myrat Garryyev Turkmen State Medical University
- Myrat Garryýew adyndaky Türkmenistanyň Döwlet lukmançylyk uniwersiteti
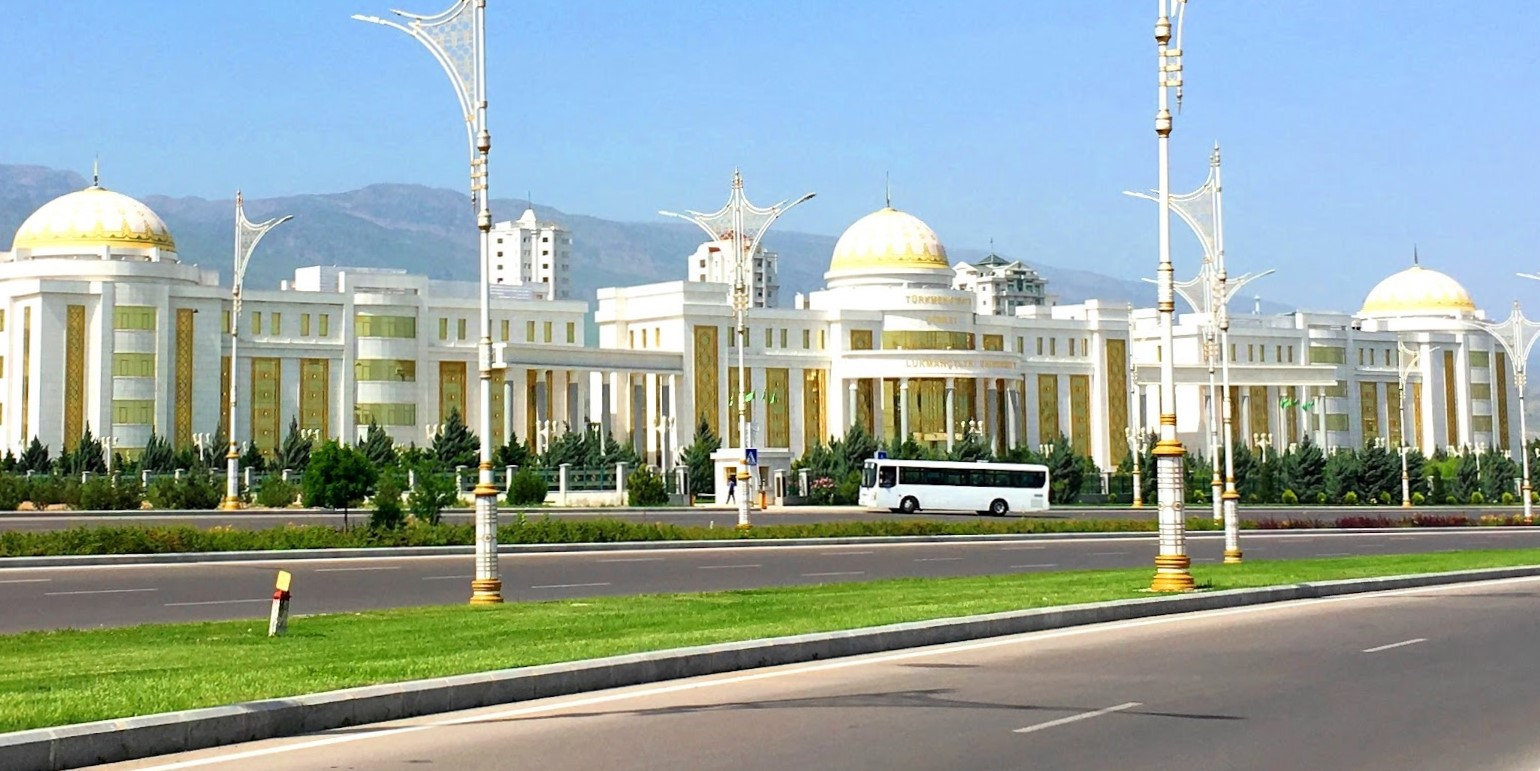
- Type: State University
- Established: 1931
- Rector: Nargozel Myratnazarova
- Students: 3,000
- Location: Archabil Avenue, Ashgabat, Turkmenistan
- Campus: Urban
- Website: www.tdlu.edu.tm

Turkmen State Medical University named after Myrat Garryev (Turkmen: Myrat Garryýew adyndaky Türkmenistanyň Döwlet lukmançylyk uniwersiteti) is a Turkmen medical university. Founded in 1931, it is the only medical university in Turkmenistan with more than 3,000 students. It is located in Ashgabat. The university reports to the Ministry of Health and the Ministry of Education of Turkmenistan. The current rector is Nargozel Myratnazarova.

== History ==
It was founded as Turkmen State Medical Institute on December 29, 1931. In 2010 Turkmen Medical Institute became the Turkmen State Medical University. On September 1, 2010, a new building at the State Medical University opened; it is located near the "Palace of ice".

In March 2019, by the Resolution of the Mejlis of Turkmenistan, the Turkmen State Medical University was named after a political and public figure - Academician of the Academy of Sciences of Turkmenistan, Deputy Chairman of the Council of Elders of Turkmenistan Myrat Orazgulyevich Garryyev.

=== Name ===
- Turkmen State Medical Institute (1932—1981)
- Turkmen Order of Friendship of Peoples State Medical Institute (1981—1997)
- State Medical Institute of Turkmenistan (1997—2010)
- Turkmen State Medical University (2010-2019)
- Turkmen State Medical University named after Myrat Garryev (2019–present)

== Faculty ==
- Medical
- Pediatrics
- Dentistry
- Pharmacy
- Preventive medicine
- Military Medicine

=== Military faculty ===
Military students studying at the Military Medical Faculty gain practical experience in the field of military medicine via the Ashgabat Trauma Center. Graduates become doctors and nurses in the Armed Forces of Turkmenistan.

== University centers ==
The following centers operate at the university:

- Dental Training and Production Center
- Scientific and Clinical Center for Eye Diseases
- Educational and Scientific Center for Maternal and Child Health Protection
- Research Center for Medical Biotechnology
- Research Center for Sports Medicine

== Honorary awards ==
- In 1981, the institute was awarded the Order of Friendship of Peoples "for merits in the development of public health, medical science and training of highly qualified specialists".
- In 2011, the university received the European Quality Award from the European Business Assembly nominations committee “for achieving high quality educational services”.
- In 2012, the university was included in the Avicenna Directories of the World Health Organization.
- In 2022, the university was included in the World Directory of Medical Schools.

== Links ==
- Official web-site
- Information at World Derictory of Medical Schools
