= Democratic Party of Turkmenistan =

Ruling party of Turkmenistan since 1991

Democratic Party of Turkmenistan Türkmenistanyň Demokratik Partiýasy
- Leader: Ata Serdarow
- Founder: Saparmurat Niyazov
- Founded: 16 December 1991
- Preceded by: Communist Party of Turkmenistan
- Headquarters: Ashgabat
- Newspaper: Galkynyş gazeti
- Youth wing: Magtymguly Youth Organisation of Turkmenistan
- Membership: 211,000 (2019)
- Ideology: Turkmen nationalism Authoritarianism Militarism; Populism; Economic statism; Resource nationalism; Historical (1990–2006): Niyazovism; Turkmen nationalism; Ethno-nationalism; Conservatism; Socialism; Neo-Stalinism; Economic statism; Rentier economics; Anti-communism; Anti-Islamism; Anti-colonialism; Militarism; Isolationism; Personalism; Fascism (accused)
- Political position: Big tent
- Colours: Green Gold
- Slogan: Döwlet adam üçindir ('The state is for the people')
- Assembly of Turkmenistan: 65 / 125

Website
- tdp.gov.tm

The Democratic Party of Turkmenistan (Turkmen: Türkmenistanyň Demokratik Partiýasy, Turkmen pronunciation: [tʏɾkmønʏθːɑnɯŋ dɛmokɾɑtɪk pɑɾtɪjɑθɯ], TDP) is a political party in Turkmenistan founded in 1991. It has been the ruling party of the country since its foundation.

The party was led by former Soviet provincial party leader Saparmurat Niyazov from the dissolution of the Soviet Union in the early 1990s until his death in 2006. In 2013, President Gurbanguly Berdimuhamedow suspended his party membership for the duration of his presidency. The current leader is Ata Serdarow. The party's rule is described as authoritarian or totalitarian.

== History ==
The TDP was created following the dissolution of the Soviet Union as a successor party to the Communist Party of Turkmenistan. The internal structure of the old party was effectively unchanged in the transition, as was the old guard. The TDP has faced limited and sporadic challenges from alternative political parties in the past but have never faced a significant challenge during an election because of the often repressive nature of politics in the country. Opposition parties are usually crushed before they make any significant grounds in public opinion. This has been the case even after the formal legalisation of opposition parties in 2010.

== Policies ==
Due to the lack of opposition parties to contest for government, the TDP controls most, if not all, industries of significant revenue directly. Central planning is a key element of party policy and serves as the basis of functionality for government services. The party's ideology of "Turkmen nationalism" was theorised by former party leader Saparmurat Niyazov for the purpose of an authoritarian state ideology in Turkmenistan.

== Chairmen ==
No.	Picture	Name (Birth–Death)	Took office	Left office	Notes
Chairman
1		Saparmurat Niyazov (1940–2006)	16 December 1991	21 December 2006	Died in office
2		Gurbanguly Berdimuhamedow (born 1957)	4 August 2007	18 August 2013	Acting chairman: 21 December 2006 – 4 August 2007
3	—N/a	Kasymguly Babaýew (born 1966)	18 August 2013	2 April 2018	
4	—N/a	Ata Serdarow (born 1964)	2 April 2018	Incumbent	

== Election results ==
Turkmenistan elects on the national level a head of state - the president - and a legislature. Elections in Turkmenistan have been widely criticised for being completely fraudulent and attempting to give an appearance of legitimacy to what is in reality a dictatorship.

=== Presidential elections ===
The last presidential election was held in 2022.

Election year	Candidate	1st round		2nd round		Results
Election year	Candidate	# Votes	% Votes	# Votes	% Votes	Results
1992	Saparmurat Niyazov	1,874,357	99.51%	—N/a		Won
2007	Gurbanguly Berdimuhamedow	2,357,120	89.23%	—N/a		Won
2012	Gurbanguly Berdimuhamedow	2,806,265	97.14%	—N/a		Won
2017	Gurbanguly Berdimuhamedow	3,090,610	97.69%	—N/a		Won
2022	Serdar Berdimuhamedow	2,452,705	72.97%	—N/a		Won

=== Legislative elections ===
The Assembly is a 125-member legislative body officially led by the president of Turkmenistan. The DPT, not unlike every other facet of political life in Turkmenistan, holds a majority of seats, with accusations that the multi-party system established in the early 2010s only consists of bloc parties, nominally independent but loyal to the DPT. The last election for the assembly was held in 2023.

Election	Leader	Votes	%	Seats	+/–	Position	Government
1994	Saparmurat Niyazov	2,008,701	100%	50 / 50	New	▲1st	Sole legal party
1999	Saparmurat Niyazov	2,224,537	100%	50 / 50	0	1st	Sole legal party
2004	Saparmurat Niyazov	1,915,000	100%	50 / 50	0	1st	Sole legal party
2008	Gurbanguly Berdimuhamedow	2,594,658	100%	125 / 125	▲75	1st	Sole legal party
2013	Kasymguly Babaýew		37.6%	47 / 125	▼78	1st	Coalition
2018	Kasymguly Babaýew			55 / 125	▲8	1st	Coalition
2023	Ata Serdarow			65 / 125	▲10	1st	Majority

== See also ==
- Elections in Turkmenistan
- People's Council of Turkmenistan
- Assembly of Turkmenistan
- Politics of Turkmenistan
