= Ministry of Health (Turkmenistan) =

Government ministry of Turkmenistan

Ministry of Health and Medical Industry of Turkmenistan
- Saglygy goraýyş we derman senagaty ministrligi

Agency overview
- Formed: 1991
- Jurisdiction: President of Turkmenistan
- Headquarters: Archabil Hwy, Ashgabat
- Minister responsible: Nurmuhammet Amannepesow
- Website: www.saglykhm.gov.tm

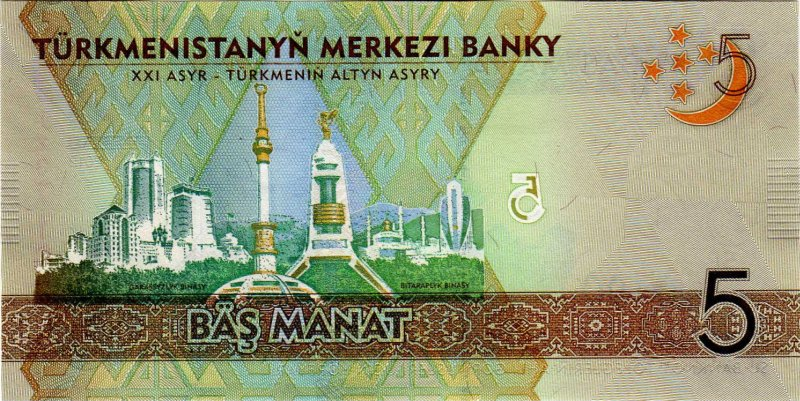
Ministry of Health building at 5 manat

The Ministry of Health and Medical Industry of Turkmenistan (Turkmen: Türkmenistanyň Saglygy goraýyş we derman senagaty ministrligi), is an agency of the Turkmenistan's government, headquartered in Ashgabat. As of 2013, Nurmuhammet Amannepesow is the minister.

== List of ministers ==
- Aksoltan Ataýewa (5 August 1992 – 9 March 1994)
- Gurbangeldy Kadamov (9 March 1994 – 21 July 1995)
- Chary Kulyýew (21 July 1995 – 15 December 1997)
- Gurbanguly Berdimuhamedow (15 December 1997 – 21 December 2006)
- Byashim Sopyev (21 December 2006 – 14 February 2007)
- Ata Serdarow (27 February 2007 – 9 April 2010)
- Gurbanmamed Ilyasov (9 April 2010 – 5 July 2013)
- Nurmuhammet Amannepesow (5 July 2013 – present)
