= Gurbanguly Berdimuhamedow =

President of Turkmenistan from 2007 to 2022

His Excellency; Arkadag; National Leader of the Turkmen People; Gurbanguly Berdimuhamedow
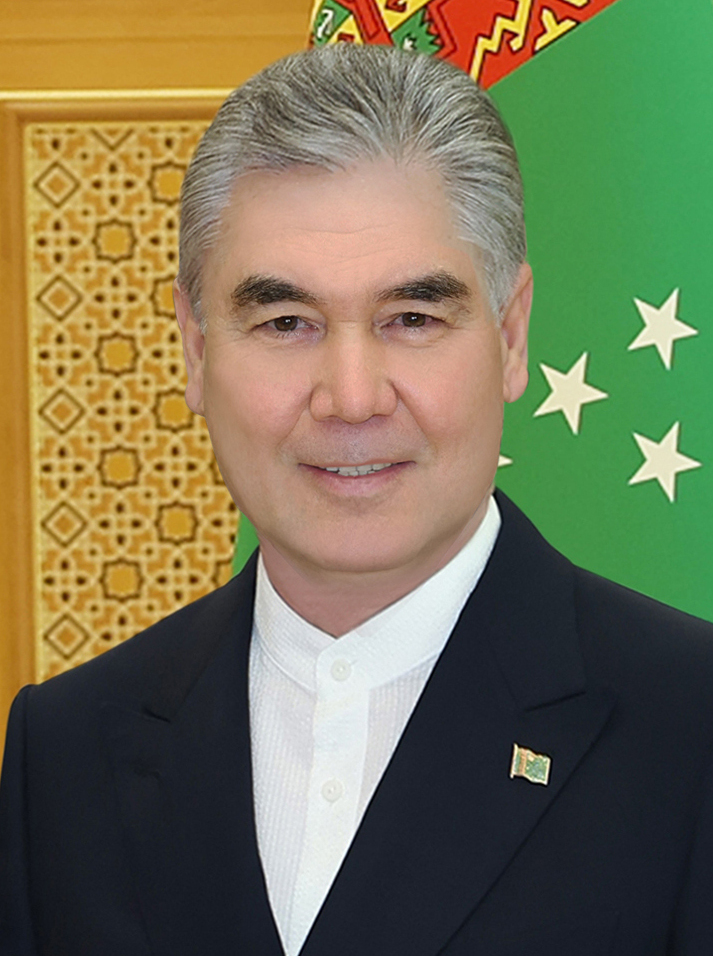
- Berdimuhamedow in 2025

Chairman of the People's Council of Turkmenistan
- Incumbent
- Assumed office 14 April 2021 (Note: The role of the People's Council changed from upper legislative chamber to the country's top governing body on 21 January 2023. Berdimuhamedow was granted the title "National Leader of the Turkmen People" concurrent with this change.)
- Preceded by: Position established

2nd President of Turkmenistan
- In office 14 February 2007 – 19 March 2022; Acting: 21 December 2006 – 14 February 2007
- Deputy: Himself (2006–2007); Raşit Meredow (2007–2022)
- Preceded by: Saparmurat Niyazov
- Succeeded by: Serdar Berdimuhamedow

2nd Chairman of the Democratic Party
- In office 4 August 2007 – 18 August 2013; Acting: 21 December 2006 – 4 August 2007
- Preceded by: Saparmurat Niyazov
- Succeeded by: Kasymguly Babaýew

3rd Deputy Chairman of the Council of Ministers of Turkmenistan
- In office 1 March 2001 – 14 February 2007
- President: Saparmurat Niyazov; Himself (acting)
- Preceded by: Orazgeldi Aýdogdiýew
- Succeeded by: Raşit Meredow

Minister of Health
- In office 15 December 1997 – 21 December 2006
- President: Saparmurat Niyazov
- Preceded by: Chary Kulyýew
- Succeeded by: Byashim Sopyev

Personal details
- Born: Gurbanguly Mälikgulyýewiç Berdimuhamedow; 29 June 1957 (age 69) Babarap, Turkmen SSR, Soviet Union
- Party: Independent (since 2013)
- Other political affiliations: Democratic (before 2013)
- Spouse: Ogulgerek Berdimuhamedowa
- Children: 4, including Serdar
- Parents: Mälikguly Berdimuhamedow (father); Ogulabat Kurrayeva (mother)
- Education: Turkmen State Medical Institute
- Profession: Dentist and lawyer

Military service
- Allegiance: Turkmenistan
- Branch/service: Turkmen Ground Forces
- Years of service: 2007–present
- Rank: Army general
- De facto leader of Turkmenistan: ← (First in role); Currently in role

Gurbanguly Mälikgulyýewiç Berdimuhamedow (Note: Turkmen: Гурбангулы Мәликгулиевич Бердимухамедов, pronounced [ɢʊɾbɑnʁʊˈlɯ mælɪk'ɢʊlɯjɛβɪtʃ bɛɾdɯmʊxɑmɛˈdoβ]; Russian: Гурбангулы Мяликгулыевич Бердымухамедов, romanized: Gurbanguly Malikgulyyevich Berdymukhamedov) (Note: Gurbanguly Berdymuhamedov, Berdymukhammedov; Although Gurbanguly Mälikgulyýewiç Berdimuhamedow is the only Turkmen form, and Turkmen, written with Latin alphabet, is the only official language of Turkmenistan, Western sources generally use the Russian form "Гурбангулы" or "Курбанкулы Мяликгулыевич Бердымухам(м)едов", using various transcriptions.) (Note: The English version of the website of the presidency uses the spelling Gurbanguly Berdimuhamedov.) (born 29 June 1957) is a Turkmen politician, lawyer and former dentist who is the de facto leader of Turkmenistan, formally serving as chairman of the People's Council of Turkmenistan since 2021. He previously served as the second president of Turkmenistan from 2006 to 2022, when he entered into a power-sharing arrangement with his son, Serdar, the current president.

A lawyer and former dentist, Berdimuhamedow served in the government of the president, Saparmurat Niyazov, as the minister of health in 1997 and as the deputy cabinet chair in 2001. He became acting president following Niyazow's death on 21 December 2006 and subsequently won the 2007 presidential election. He faced no meaningful opposition and won by an overwhelming margin with 89% of the vote. In 2012, he was re-elected for a second term with 97% of the vote and he was re-elected again in 2017 with 97.7% of the vote. He was among the candidates elected to the People's Council of Turkmenistan on 28 March 2021, as a member from Ahal Region. He reportedly received 100% of votes from the electors. On 14 April 2021, he was unanimously elected chairman of the People's Council, the upper chamber of the Turkmen parliament.

Like his predecessor, Berdimuhamedow headed an authoritarian regime and is the subject of a cult of personality. Rights groups have described Turkmenistan under Berdimuhamedow as one of the most repressive countries in the world, accusing Berdimuhamedow, his relatives, and his associates of possessing and exercising unlimited power over all aspects of public life.

Berdimuhamedow stepped down as president on 19 March 2022, being succeeded by his son, Serdar, who won a snap election deemed as neither free nor fair, making Turkmenistan the first Central Asian country to be ruled by a dynastic system in modern times. The People's Council was subsequently re-formed as the country's top leadership body in January 2023, with Serdar then reappointing his father as its chairman and granting him the title "National Leader of the Turkmen People".

== Early years ==
Berdimuhamedow was born on 29 June 1957 in Babarap, in what is now Gökdepe District, Ahal Province, to Mälikguly Berdimuhamedowiç Berdimuhamedow (1932–2021) and Ogulabat Kürräýewna Kürräýewa (1937–2023). He is the only son in a family of six children. Berdimuhamedow’s father worked as a senior Interior Ministry officer in a prison guard detachment. He retired as a colonel of police. Berdimuhamedow's grandfather, Berdimuhamed Annaýew, was a local teacher who served in the Red Army during World War II as part of the 748th Rifle Regiment of the 206th Rifle Division of the 2nd Ukrainian Front. In September 1943, his unit was one of the first to cross the Dnieper River. He was later killed in the 1948 Ashgabat earthquake.

=== Professional career ===
Berdimuhamedow graduated from the Turkmen State Medical Institute in 1979 and entered a career in dentistry. He also received a PhD in medical sciences in Moscow. By 1992 he had become part of the dentistry faculty at the Medical Institute. In 1995, during the rule of Saparmyrat Nyýazow, he became head of the dentistry center of the Ministry of Health and Medical Industry.

== Political rise ==
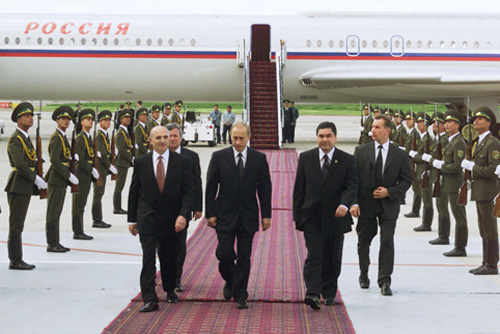
Berdimuhamedow with Russian President Vladimir Putin at Ashgabat Airport, April 2002

He was appointed to the government as Minister of Health in 1997. In 2001 he was appointed as one of several deputy chairmen of the Cabinet of Ministers (also referred to as Deputy Prime Minister, despite the lack of a Prime Ministerial post in Turkmenistan), in this case responsible for health, science, education, and sports. In April 2004, Nyýazow suspended Berdimuhamedow's salary for three months because healthcare workers were not being paid.

The Health Ministry was responsible for carrying out Nyýazow's order to close all hospitals outside of the national and provincial capitals in 2005.

== President of Turkmenistan (2006–2022) ==
Following Nyýazow's death in December 2006, the State Security Council of Turkmenistan appointed Berdimuhamedow acting president. The council stated in its announcement that Öwezgeldi Ataýew, who, as the chairman of the Assembly of Turkmenistan was to have become the acting president, was not appointed "in view of the fact that the prosecutor-general had instituted criminal proceedings against him".

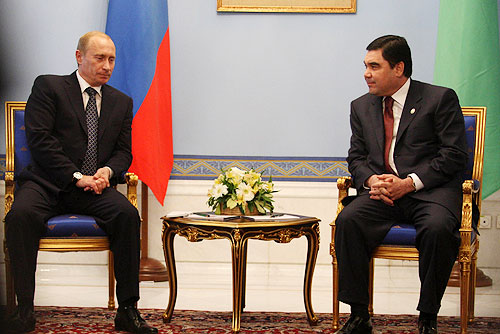
Gurbanguly Berdimuhamedow and Vladimir Putin in Tehran, 2007

Article 60 of the Turkmen Constitution stipulated that the acting president "may not stand for election to the Presidency", which would have barred Berdimuhamedow from running in the 2007 presidential elections. However, on 24 December 2006, the People's Council voted to remove this provision, making him eligible for the election as one of the six chosen candidates, all members of the Democratic Party of Turkmenistan. Berdimuhamedow was supported by the political elite, and the official results showed him as winning 89% of the vote. Berdimuhamedow's appointment as interim president and subsequent run for president, however, violated the constitution.

In his first presidential trip abroad, Berdimuhamedow visited Saudi Arabia in mid-April 2007. There he performed the Umrah pilgrimage and met with King Abdullah. He then visited Russia and President Vladimir Putin at the end of the same month.

After taking office, Berdimuhamedow reversed several of Nyýazow's more eccentric policies. Internet cafés offering free and uncensored web access opened in Ashgabat, compulsory education was extended from nine to ten years and classes in sports and foreign languages were re-introduced into the curriculum, and the government announced plans to open several specialised schools for the arts. He called for reform of education, health care and pension systems, and government officials of non-Turkmen ethnic origin who had been sacked by Nyýazow were allowed to return to work. He also restored the pensions of 100,000 elderly people whose pensions Nyýazow had slashed in the face of an unspecified budget crisis. Later on, he reopened the Turkmen Academy of Sciences, which had been closed by Nyýazow.

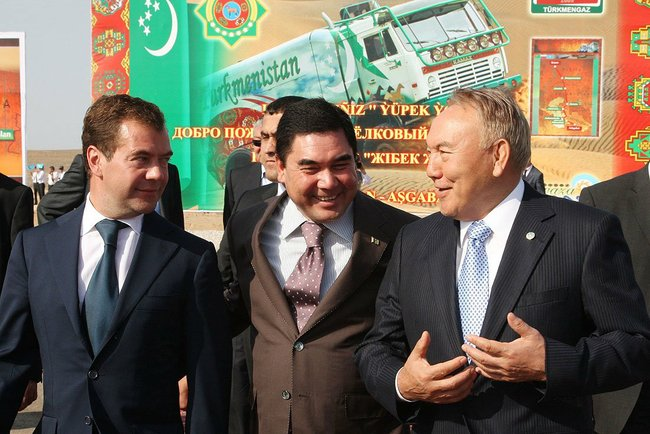
With President Dmitry Medvedev and President of Kazakhstan Nursultan Nazarbayev, September 2009

In 2015, work on TAPI began under his government.

In February 2017, he was reelected to a third term as President of Turkmenistan (seven-year term) with nearly 98% of the votes in his favour and with an eligible voter turnout of 97%. In October 2017, he offered a top Turkmen-bred variety of the Central Asian shepherd dog to Vladimir Putin.

Berdimuhamedow served as president of the National Olympic Committee of Turkmenistan.

In 2020, Berdimuhamedow presided over the COVID-19 pandemic in Turkmenistan. He was among eight world leaders to have received the satiric Ig Nobel Prize in Medical Education "for using the COVID-19 viral pandemic to teach the world that politicians can have a more immediate effect on life and death than scientists and doctors can". On 10 November of that same year, he unveiled a golden statue of his favourite dog breed, the Central Asian shepherd.

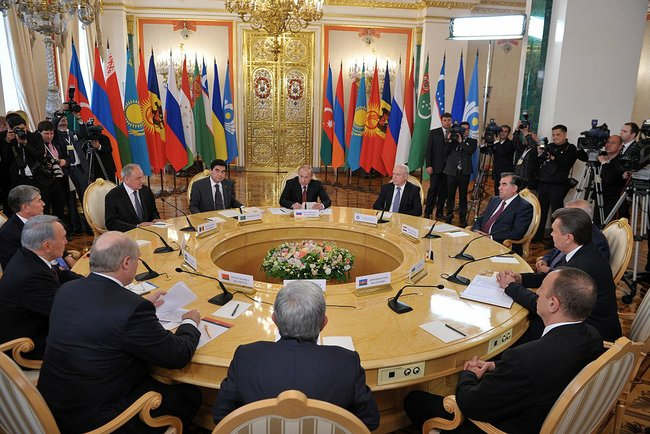
Informal meeting of the CIS heads of state in May 2012

Berdimuhamedow replaced the Interior Minister Mammetkhan Chakiyev with his deputy Ovezdurdy Khojaniyazov on 1 July 2021. Khojaniyazov has little public profile to speak of, but one of his most recent positions, as of May at least, was as deputy head of the Awaza tourist recreation zone. The previous interior minister, Isgender Mulikov, was arrested, sentenced to a lengthy prison term on corruption charges, and shown on state television handcuffed in a prison robe with his head shaved.

In July 2021, Berdimuhamedow ordered the deployment of troops and heavy weapons and armour on the Afghanistan–Turkmenistan border, in order to avoid a spillover of the Afghan conflict into Turkmenistan.

In February 2022, it was reported from Reuters that Berdimuhamedow was planning to resign after an early presidential election on 12 March, fuelling speculation that he would be preparing for his son Serdar to succeed him as the next President. Berdimuhamedow did not contest the election, which was subsequently won by Serdar, establishing Turkmenistan as the first Central Asian country to transfer power dynastically from father to son. Serdar was inaugurated as the next President on 19 March.

=== Totalitarianism ===
External videos
- Turkmenistan's president announces end of free gas, electricity, water, and salt
- Turkmen president visits local village

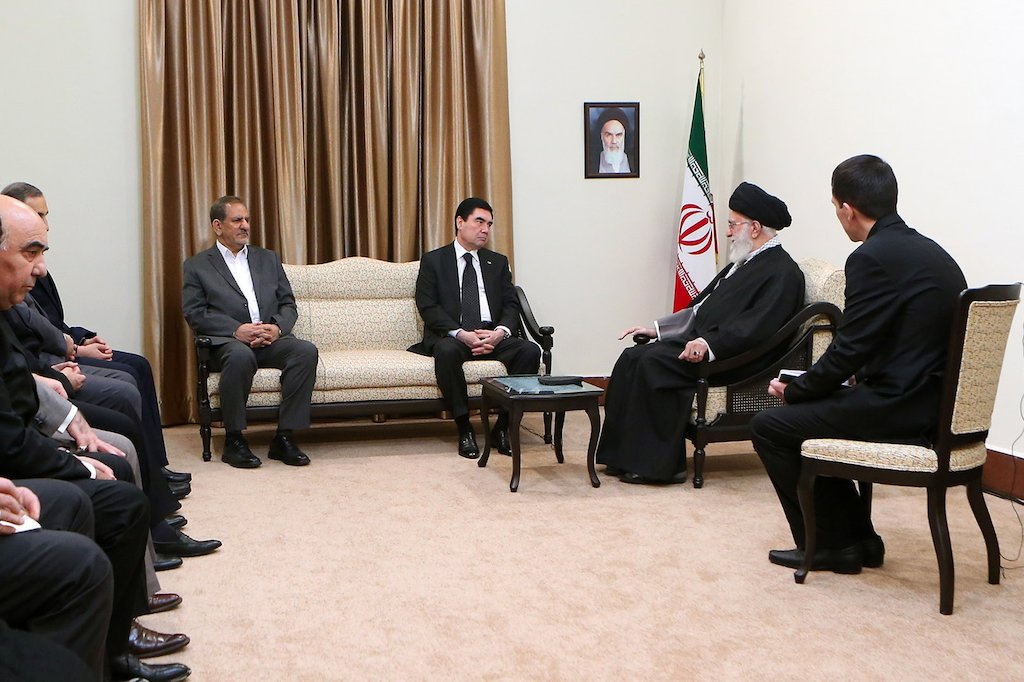
Iranian supreme leader Ali Khamenei receives Berdimuhamedow in his house, 2015

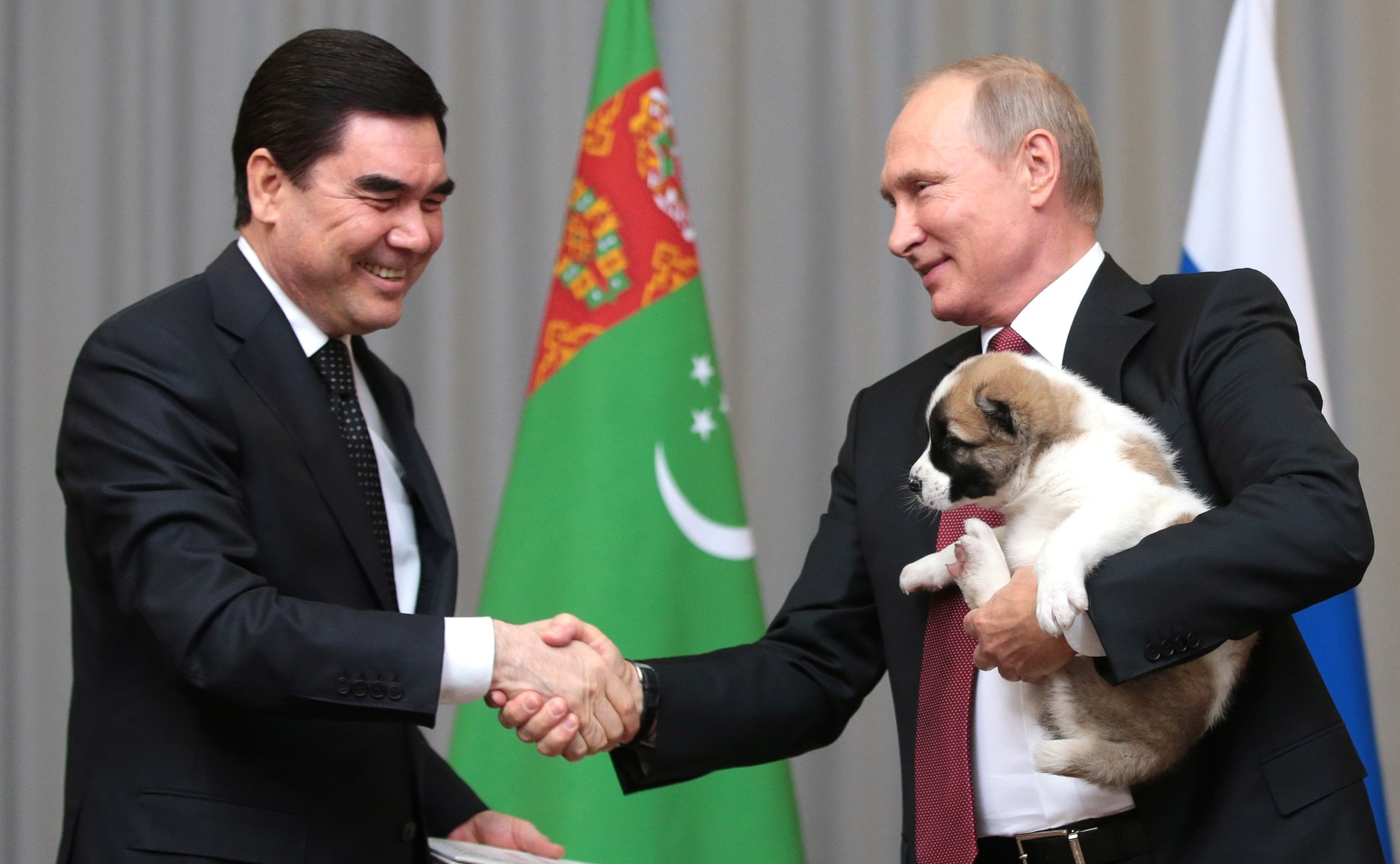
Vladimir Putin and Berdimuhamedow in 2017

Upon taking office, Berdimuhamedow eased travel restrictions and reopened libraries in rural areas. He also took steps to curb Nyýazow's extensive personality cult. He called for an end to the elaborate pageants of music and dancing that formerly greeted the president on his arrival anywhere, and said that the Turkmen "sacred oath", part of which states that the speaker's tongue should shrivel if he ever speaks ill of Turkmenistan or its president, should not be recited multiple times a day but reserved for "special occasions". He also gave up his right to rename any landmarks, institutions, or cities, restored the traditional names of the months of the year and days of the week (Nyýazow had renamed them after himself and his mother, among other things), and announced plans to move the gold rotating statue of Nyýazow from Ashgabat's central square.

Despite these changes, Berdimuhamedow's regime remained rigidly authoritarian; indeed, in 2007, he ruled out any move toward Western-style democracy. Freedom House rated Berdimuhamedow's Turkmenistan as one of the most repressive and "closed" regimes in the world. It has ranked Turkmenistan near the bottom of its Freedom in the World rankings since the country's independence, a state of affairs that has continued since Berdimuhamedow took office. In 2017, the country was one of 11 with the lowest aggregate scores for political and civil rights. Human Rights Watch noted that Berdimuhamedow not only has complete control over public life and the media, but presides over a regime that does not tolerate "alternative political or religious expression."

Reporters Without Borders (RWB) has ranked Turkmenistan near the bottom of its Press Freedom Index for most of Berdimuhamedow's tenure, as it did under Nyýazow. In 2017, RWB ranked Turkmenistan 178th out of 180 countries surveyed, ahead of Eritrea and North Korea. RWB noted that internet access is heavily censored in Turkmenistan, and that satellite dishes have been removed by government officials.

In 2008, he dismissed Akmyrat Rejepow, the longtime chief of the presidential security detail and one of the main proponents of Nyýazow's personality cult. In 2011, he sang a song on a video posted to YouTube.

In May 2013, he fell off his horse during a race. The fall was censored on TV but leaked online, and mocked on an episode of HBO's Last Week Tonight with John Oliver in 2019. Journalists leaving the country following the accident reported that their electronic devices were searched for traces of footage of the incident.

In July 2013, Jennifer Lopez publicly apologised for singing “Happy Birthday!” to Berdimuhamedow during a sponsored concert, stating she was not aware of the human rights issues in Turkmenistan prior to the show. In August 2013, Berdimuhamedow suspended his Democratic Party of Turkmenistan membership for the duration of his presidency, ostensibly to remain "above partisan politics" and "promote a multiparty system."

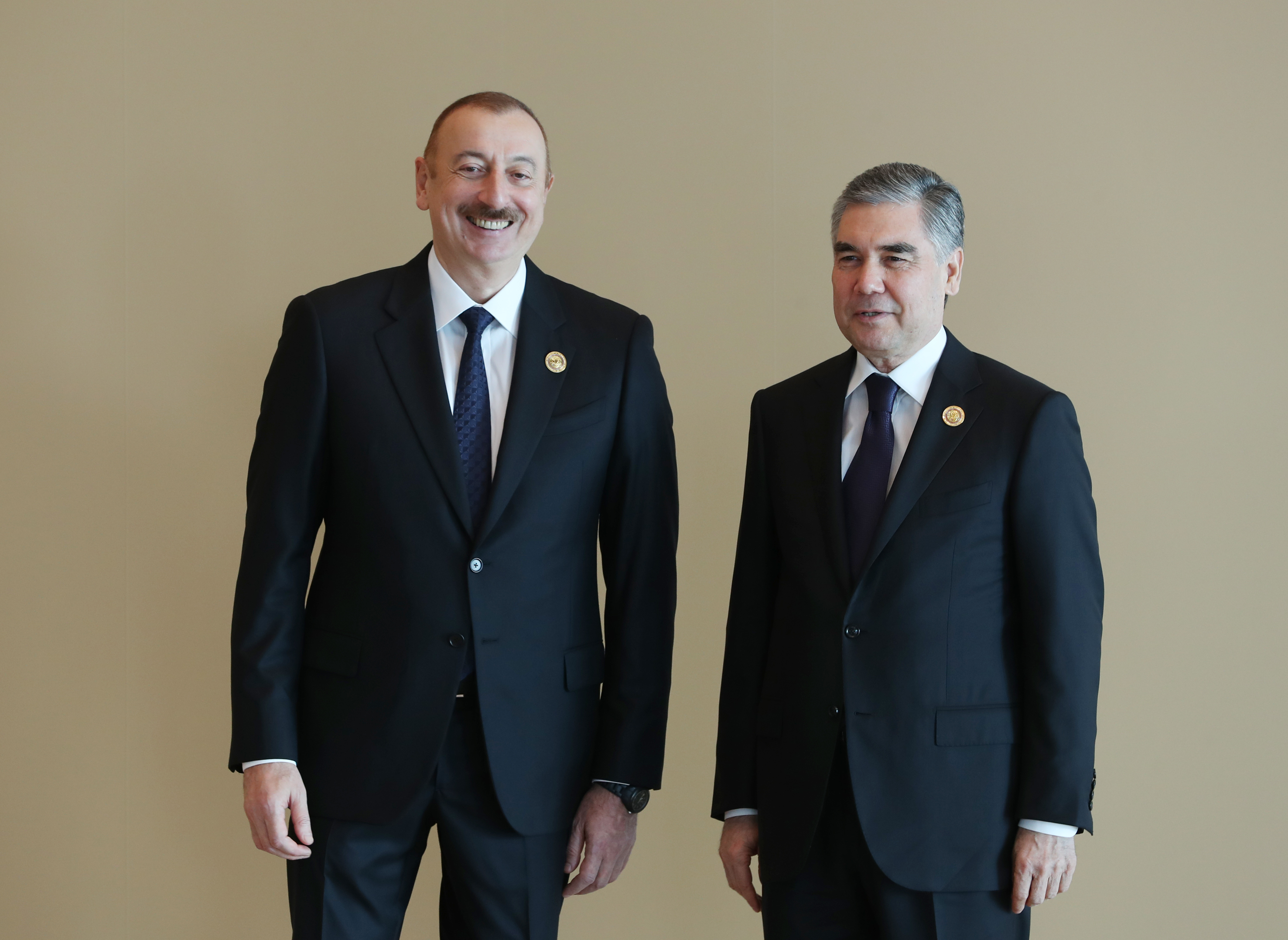
Berdimuhamedow with Azerbaijani President Ilham Aliyev at the 18th Summit of Non-Aligned Movement in Baku, 2019

In 2015, a golden statue of Berdimuhamedow riding a horse atop a white-marble cliff was erected in Ashgabat.

The Turkmenistan Parliament abolished term limits for the presidency in September 2016, which allowed Berdimuhamedow to run for a third term.

In January 2018, Berdimuhamedow ordered the impounding of black cars in the capital because he considered the colour white to be "lucky". Police seized dark-coloured vehicles in Ashgabat and their owners were told they must pay to have them repainted silver or white. The capital, known as the 'City of White Marble', holds the world record for the highest concentration of white-marble buildings. Berdimuhamedow is a known lover of the colour white, living in a white palace and travelling in white limousines. It was later reported that the ban extended to vehicles of all colours except white.

In July 2018, he appeared in a rap video with his grandson, Kerimguly Berdimuhamedow, with lyrics in both Turkmen and English. He had previously lifted weights on camera, and also acted as DJ.

By decree of Berdimuhamedow in January 2019, the government gradually phased out state funding of the Academy of Sciences of Turkmenistan over a period of three years.

=== Violation of individual rights ===
In 2010, the Ukrainian magazine Obozrevatel named Berdimuhamedow the fifth-worst dictator in the world out of 23 highlighted. In the Press Freedom Index (Reporters Without Borders), Turkmenistan ranks 176 out of 178.

Turkmenistan has more political prisoners than any of the other former countries of the former Soviet Union.

=== Corruption ===
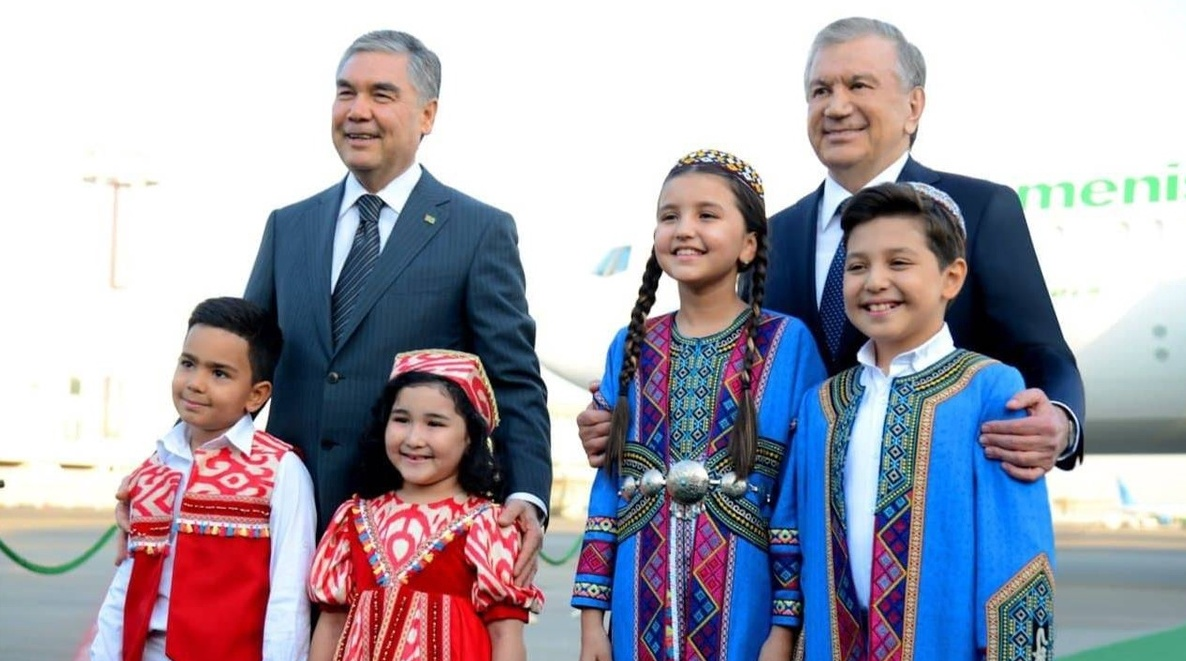
Presidents of Uzbekistan and Turkmenistan at the reception ceremony at the airport named after Islam Karimov, 2021

The country's economy is under total state control. Numerous attempts to attract foreign investors into the country often end in lawsuits in international courts. In 2018, the International Center for the Settlement of Investment Disputes (arbitration, part of the World Bank group of organisations) received claims against Turkmenistan from Sece Inşaat (Turkey) and investment company Unionmatex Industrieanlagen GmbH (Germany).

In 2019, the Belarusian construction company Belgorkhimprom also filed a similar claim with the court, to which Turkmenistan should pay about $200 million.

Investors talk about discrimination by the Turkmen authorities, politicised bureaucracy, and a high level of corruption.

In the Transparency International Corruption Perception Index, Turkmenistan ranked 161 among 180 countries in 2018. This is the lowest rating among countries in Eastern Europe and Central Asia.

In 2019, Turkmenistan ranked 164th among 180 countries in the ranking of economic freedom.

=== Cult of personality ===
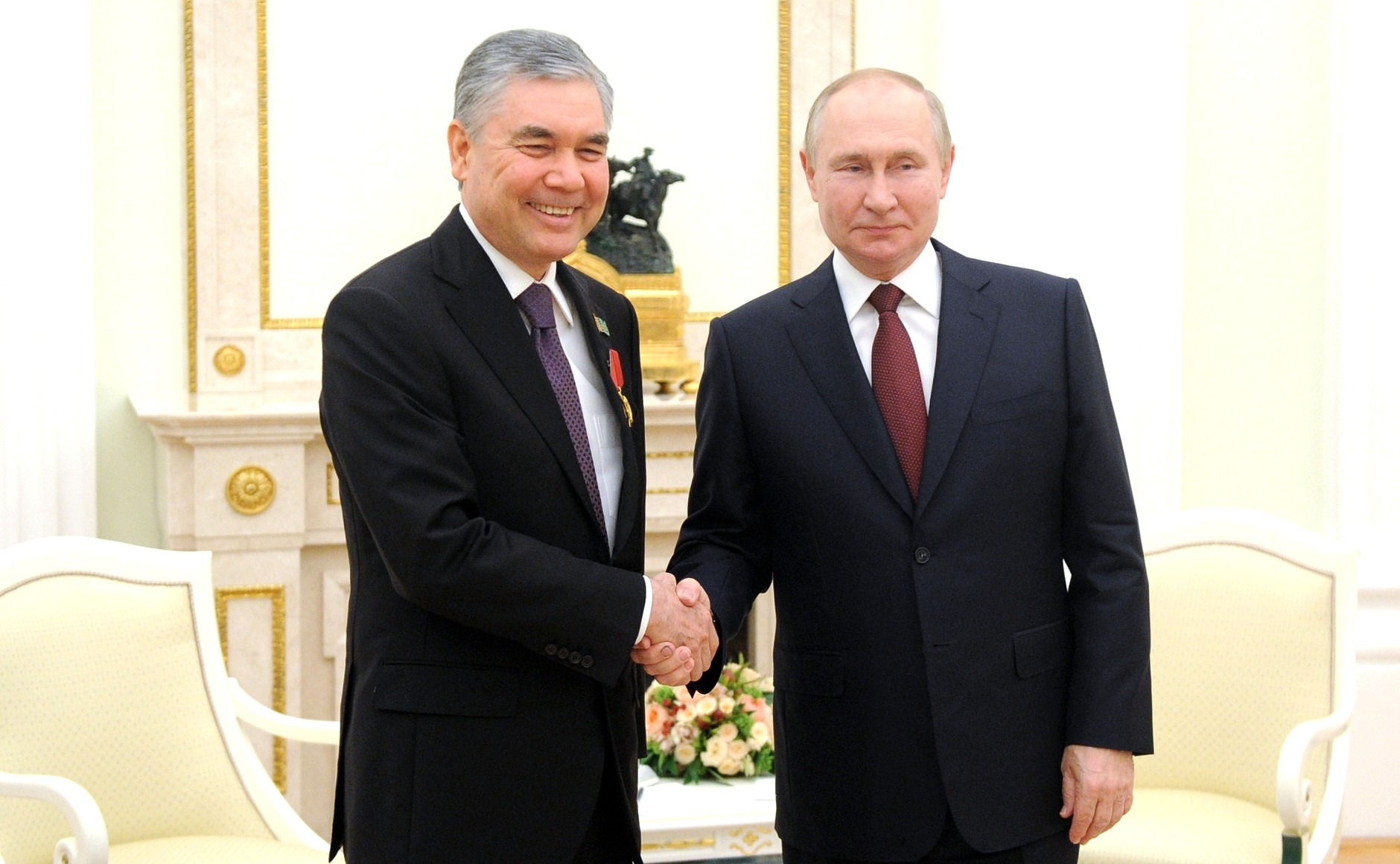
Berdimuhamedow and Putin in 2022

Berdimuhamedow uses the honorific title Arkadag, translating to "protector" in the Turkmen language.

Berdimuhamedow's grandfather and father both serve as part of his cult of personality. His grandfather, Berdimuhamed Annayev, has since 2018 been a posthumous recipient of the Russian Order of Honour, being one of two awards he holds (the other being the Soviet Order of the Badge of Honour). The Berdimuhamed Annayev 1st Specialized Military School of the Ministry of Defence is named in his honour. A museum in the defence ministry is also named after him. In May 2020, a special delegation from Russia led by Deputy Minister of Defence Alexander Fomin brought the banner of Annayev's unit to Ashgabat, being trooped through the square in front of the Halk Hakydasy Memorial Complex during the inaugural Victory Day Parade in the capital.

On 1 September 2009, Secondary School No. 27 was renamed after Berdimuhamed Annayev and was opened with his son at the opening ceremony. In October 2012, the Main Drama Theater of Turkmenistan staged a play based on Berdimuhamedow's book about his grandfather called "Good Name Imperishable". Military Unit 1001 of the Ministry of Internal Affairs is named in honour of Berdimuhamedow's father, Malikguly Berdimuhamedow. In addition, in the town of Yzgant, the Palace of Culture is named after Berdimuhamedow's father, and a bust of him stands in front of it.

On 20 December 2022, the National Council passed a decree naming the new capital of Ahal Province "Arkadag" in honour of Berdimuhamedow. Additionally, three buildings were named in honour of Berdimuhamedow or members of his family: a health and rehabilitation center in his honour, the horse breeding academy after his great-uncle, and a pedagogical school after his grandfather.

The 21 January 2023 presidential decree appointing Berdimuhamedow chair of the People's Council contains the following paragraph as justification for his appointment as National Leader:

"Considering the tremendous merits in establishing a solid foundation for a democratic and secular state with rule of law, all-around development and strengthening the international prestige of independent neutral Turkmenistan, strengthening the unity of society, harmony and cohesion of the people during long years of state and social work, recognition as a prominent statesman and politician, who has received great honor, great respect, and esteem of the Turkmen people, high organizational skills in wise management demonstrating an outstanding example of competence, decisiveness, and leadership, successfully implementing the humane policy of "The state is for the man!" in the era of the Renaissance of the new era of the powerful state..."

Portraits of Gurbanguly Berdimuhamedow are displayed in businesses and government offices, and during his presidency were affixed to the front bulkhead of airliners of the national airline. In February 2023, a new magazine, Arkadagly Ýaşlar ("Youth with Arkadag") began publication. On 30 September 2023 the Assembly of Turkmenistan passed a law creating the Arkadag medal, a state award to be granted to citizens and non-citizens who have made "a weighty contribution to development of social, public, humanitarian, charitable, volunteer activity and in the organisation of medical services, rehabilitation as well as financial and material aid, consultation and the technical aid to children and the youth, who are in need of assistance."

== Post-presidency and National Leader ==
The People's Council of Turkmenistan (Turkmen: Halk Maslahaty) was restored in September 2020. While still serving as president, Berdimuhamedow stood for election from Ahal Province and won a seat on 28 March 2021. He was subsequently unanimously elected chairperson of the People's Council despite that being a violation of the constitution.

On 21 January 2023, Berdimuhamedow's son, as president, reappointed Berdimuhamedow to the chairmanship of the reorganised People's Council (viz.). Via a separate "constitutional law" signed into effect 21 January 2023, President Serdar Berdimuhamedow also appointed his father "national leader" (Turkmen: Milli Lider) of Turkmenistan. This appointment accords the elder Berdimuhamedow the right to speak out on any matter of public interest, as well as immunity from prosecution (also extending to members of his family), personal protection by national security agencies, and financial support from the government. New laws were quickly promulgated that named the new People's Council the "supreme organ of state authority" in Turkmenistan, making its chairman a supreme leader outranking the president.

Berdimuhamedow visited Moscow in November 2022 at the invitation of the speaker of the Russian upper house, Valentina Matvienko. He subsequently made additional trips abroad and met with visiting foreign delegations. His first foreign visit as National Leader was to the United Arab Emirates in February 2023.

== Honours ==
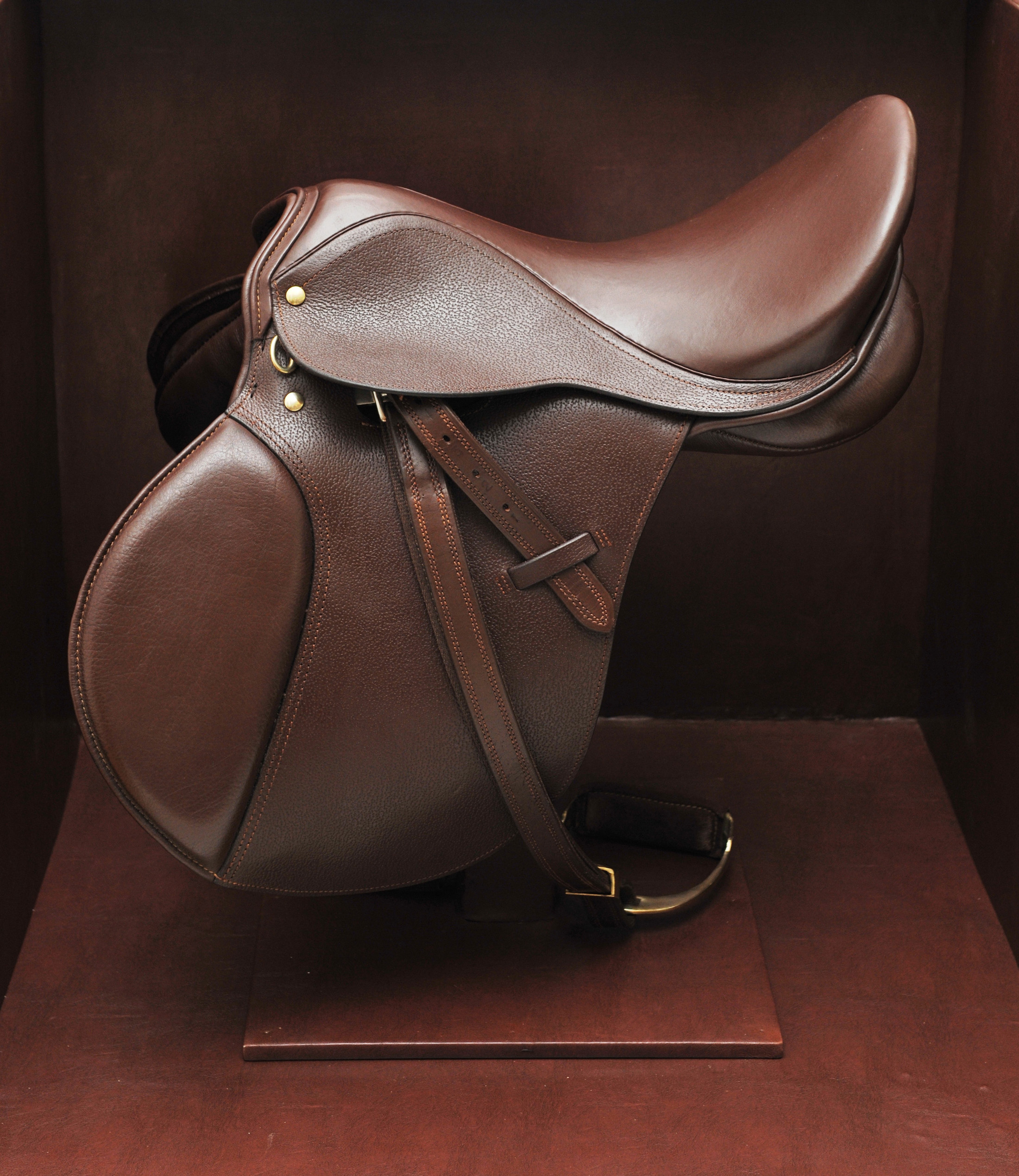
A specially handcrafted horse saddle given to him as a gift from Indian Prime Minister Narendra Modi in July 2015.

=== Domestic awards ===
- 1994 – Star of President Order
- 2016 – Medal «Türkmenistanyň Garaşsyzlygynyň 25 ýyllygyna» (25 Years of Turkmenistan's Independence)
- 2019 – «Hormatly il ýaşulusy» (Honorary Elder of the State)
- 2021 – «Türkmenistanyň ussat halypa seýsi» (Master Equestrian of Turkmenistan)
- 2022 – Skillful Diplomat of Turkmenistan

=== Foreign awards ===
- 2007 – Saudi Arabia: Order of King Abdulaziz
- 2007 – United Arab Emirates: Order of Zayed
- 2007 – Uzbekistan: Order of Distinguished Service
- 2008 – Kazakhstan: Medal "10 years of Astana"
- 2010 – Tajikistan: Order of Ismoili Somoni
- 2011 – Bahrain: Order of Sheikh Isa bin Salman Al Khalifa
- 2012 – Turkey: First Class of the Order of the State of Republic of Turkey
- 2013 – Serbia: Order of the Republic of Serbia
- 2014 – China: Honorary Professor, Beijing Medical University
- 2014 – Azerbaijan: Order of Sheikh-ul-Islam
- 2015 – South Korea: Honorary Doctorate, Sungkyunkwan University
- 2015 – Japan: Honorary Doctorate, University of Tsukuba
- 2016 – Islamic Republic of Afghanistan: Gazy Mohammad Akbar Khan Medal
- 2016 – Pakistan: Honorary Doctor of Political Science, Quaid-i-Azam University
- 2016 – Moldova: Order of the Republic
- 2017 – Gagauzia: Order of Gagauz-Yeri
- 2017 – Kazakhstan: Order of Dostyk
- 2017 – Russia: Order of Alexander Nevsky
- 2017 – Russia: Order of Dyslyk
- 2018 – Malaysia: Certificate of Award "for development of mass media", Asia-Pacific Broadcasters Association
- 2022 – Kazakhstan: Order of the Golden Eagle
- 2022 – Russia: Order "For Merit to the Fatherland"

==== Supranational ====
- 2022 – Organization of Turkic States: 2022 Supreme Order of Turkic World

== Personal life ==
=== Family ===
According to a cable from the U.S. embassy in Ashgabat, Berdimuhamedow is married and has three daughters (two legitimate, Oguljahan Atabaýewa and Gülşan Amanowa, and one illegitimate) and one son, Serdar Berdimuhamedow, the current president of Turkmenistan.

One of his sons-in-law, Yhlasgeldi Amanov, reportedly headed the Turkmen State Agency for Management and Use of Hydrocarbon Resources in London and was reportedly later assigned to the Turkmenistan Embassies in Berlin and London, and as of 23 November 2019 was Turkmenistan's consul general in Dubai. According to the diplomatic cable, the other son-in-law is also a diplomat, with a prior posting in Paris, but later assigned to Brussels. However, other sources indicate that the identities were reversed in the diplomatic cable, and that the Atabayevs were posted to London and Berlin, not the Amanovs.

Daughter Oguljahan is vice president and executive director of the Gurbanguly Berdimuhamedow Charitable Fund for Children.

According to the same leaked cables, Gurbanguly Berdimuhamedow has a mistress, Marina, a Russian nurse, whom he supposedly met earlier in his dentist career. They have a daughter together. Berdimuhamedow's wife has been living in London since 2007. Serdar served in the Armed Forces and the Assembly of Turkmenistan, and held a series of high government posts, leading to appointment as a deputy chairman of the Cabinet of Ministers before his election to the presidency. At least three of Berdimuhamedow's grandchildren have studied in Switzerland. According to a biography of Berdimuhamedow's father, Malikguly, published in 2012, Berdimuhamedow has five sisters.

On 18 April 2021, Gurbanguly Berdimuhamedow's father, Mälikguly Berdimuhamedow, reportedly died at the age of 89. Gurbanguly Berdimuhamedow's mother, Ogulabat Berdimuhamedowa (née Kürräýewa), died in April 2023 at the age of 86.

The Berdimuhamedow family makes extensive use of a fleet of five VIP-configured Boeing airplanes.

=== Hobbies ===
According to Turkmen propaganda, Berdimuhamedow likes to write books, or songs, act as a DJ and engage in health activities during spare time.

In 2019, Berdimuhamedow was awarded the highest award of the International Cycling Union (UCI) for his country’s commitment to the sport.

=== Health ===
On 20 July 2019, the YouTube channel of a Turkmen opposition media outlet published false reports that Berdimuhamedow had died while on holiday at the age of 61. He was said to have been on leave since 15 July. These reports were published by multiple regional media outlets on the next day. The Turkmen Ambassador to Kyrgyzstan, Shadurdy Mereov, and the Kyrgyz Ministry of Foreign Affairs denied these claims on 21 July. According to Chronicles of Turkmenistan, Berdimuhamedow went to Germany because his mother was receiving medical treatment there, and her condition was critical.

== Electoral history ==
Electoral history of Gurbanguly Berdimuhamedow
Year	Office	Party	Votes received				Result
Year	Office	Party	Total	%	P.	Swing	Result
2007	President of Turkmenistan	TDP	2,357,120	89.07%	1st	—N/a	Won
2012	President of Turkmenistan	TDP	2,806,265	97.14%	1st	+8.07	Won
2017	President of Turkmenistan	IND	3,090,610	97.69%	1st	+0.55	Won

== See also ==
- Politics of Turkmenistan
- FK Arkadag

== Notes ==
Political offices
Preceded by Orazgeldi Aýdogdyýew	Vice-President of Turkmenistan; 2001–2007	Succeeded by Raşit Meredow
Preceded by Saparmyrat Nyýazow	President of Turkmenistan; 2007–2022	Succeeded by Serdar Berdimuhamedow
Preceded by Orazgeldi Aydogdiyev	Chairman of the People's Council of Turkmenistan; 2021–present	Incumbent
Party political offices
Preceded by Saparmyrat Nyýazow	Leader of the Democratic Party of Turkmenistan; 2007–2013	Succeeded by Kasymguly Babaev
