= People's Council of Turkmenistan =

Supreme constitutional authority in Turkmenistan

- Halk Maslahaty
- Emblem of Turkmenistan

Agency overview
- Formed: 21 January 2023 (current form)
- Preceding agency: 1992–2008 (the highest representative body), 2021–2023 (upper chamber)
- Type: Supreme constitutional authority
- Jurisdiction: Government of Turkmenistan
- Headquarters: Ashgabat
- Agency executives: Gurbanguly Berdimuhamedow, Chairman; Kasymguly Babaýew, Chief of Staff
- Website: https://maslahat.gov.tm/en

The People's Council of Turkmenistan (Turkmen: Halk Maslahaty, [xɑlq mɑθlɑxɑt̪ɯ]; "People's Council") is Turkmenistan's independent "representative body" exerting supreme constitutional authority. It includes in its membership, but is not considered part of, the legislature. Among other things, it is empowered to amend the constitution. Its chairman is appointed by the president and is designated the "National Leader". State media referred to the People's Council as the "supreme representative organ of people's power", a title similar to the "supreme organ of state power" of the Supreme Soviet of the USSR and of Soviet Turkmenistan. From 2021 to 2023 it was the upper chamber of Turkmenistan's Parliament, the "National Council" (Turkmen: Milli Geňeş).

== Composition ==
As of 22 January 2023 the full membership and size of the People's Council were unclear, but Turkmen state media declared it would include "representatives of state organs, society, regions, including wise elders, youth being the country's future." According to official state media, the People's Council will include:

- its Chairman
- the President of Turkmenistan
- Speaker of the Assembly of Turkmenistan
- Chairperson of the Supreme Court
- Secretary of the State Security Council
- Deputies of the Assembly
- Members of the Cabinet of Ministers
- Ombudsman
- Prosecutor General
- Minister of Justice
- Governors of provinces and districts, and mayors (häkim) of cities
- Chairpersons of people's councils of provinces, districts, and cities
- Chairpersons (arçyn) of councils of cities and towns that are district capitals
- Heads of political parties, labour unions, and other societal organisations
- Representatives of society, including elders proposed by the people's councils of provinces and the city of Ashgabat.

By law the president of Turkmenistan chairs the council in the event of incapacitation of the chairperson. The former deputy chairperson was identified in Turkmen state media as chief of staff (Russian: управляющий делами) in February 2023.

On 18 July 2023 the People's Council adopted a resolution forming an Elders Council (Turkmen: Ýaşulular geňeşi, Russian: Совет старейшин).

== Authority ==
The law governing the People's Council stipulates that it will

1) review and approve proposals on issues on adoption of the Constitution or Constitutional laws of Turkmenistan, their amendment and augmentation;
2) review and approve basic directions of domestic and foreign policy of the state, as well as programs and laws on the political, economic, social, and cultural development of the country;
3) hear annual addresses of the President of Turkmenistan;
4) review issues of peace and security;
5) fulfill the right of legislative initiative;
6) fulfill any other authorities foreseen in Turkmen law.

== History ==
The Halk Maslahaty was originally the highest representative body in Turkmenistan (Article 45 of the 1992 Constitution). It was abolished in the new constitution of 2008.

The original council had 2,507 members, some of whom were elected. All candidates at the elections of 7 April 2003 (turnout 89.3%) belonged to the Democratic Party of Turkmenistan. Like the Assembly of Turkmenistan (the parliament), it was led by the President, who was constitutionally the head of both the legislative and the executive branches of government.

Turkmenistan's administration was based on Halk Maslahatys on different levels. Each province (welaýat) of Turkmenistan had its own (originally 80-member, now 40-member) welaýat halk maslahaty, whose members are elected directly in constituencies. Their influence has been fairly limited even on paper and probably even more so in practice, taking into account that Turkmenistan is a dominant-party state ruled mostly by its president. On lower administrative levels, district and city halk maslahatys existed, as well.

The national-level Halk Maslahaty was abolished when President Gurbanguly Berdimuhamedow introduced a new constitution in 2008, its powers being returned to the Assembly and the President. In October 2017, however, President Gurbanguly Berdymukhammedov reorganised the Council of Elders into a new People's Council.

In September 2020 the Turkmenistan Parliament adopted a constitutional amendment creating an upper chamber and thus making the Parliament bicameral. The People's Council became the upper chamber. It consists of 56 members, 48 of whom are elected indirectly (i.e., by electors, not by popular ballot) and 8 of whom are appointed by the president. Together with the previous unicameral parliament, the 125-seat Mejlis, as the lower chamber, the Parliament was called the National Council (Turkmen: Milli Geňeş). Elections to the upper chamber were held 28 March 2021. Elections to the Mejlis were last held 25 March 2018.

Outside observers consider the Turkmen legislature to be a rubber stamp parliament.

In 2022 the Halk Maslahaty was officially renamed Döwlet Maslahaty ("Government Council").

In January 2023 both chambers of parliament proposed to abolish the Halk Maslahaty as a legislative organ, to reform it as an independent representative body, and to place all legislative authority in a unicameral Assembly (Mejlis). This proposal was adopted in a joint session of the National Council on 21 January 2023.

=== Results of 2021 election ===
Turkmen official media reported that 231 out of 240 eligible electors came from the Halk Maslahatys of the five provinces and Ashgabat city, meaning 98.7% of eligible electors participated in the 2021 election. They included 37 from Ahal province, 38 from Lebap province, and 39 each from the other provinces and the city of Ashgabat. One hundred twelve candidates competed for 48 seats. Twenty-seven per cent of the winning candidates were women. President Gurbanguly Berdimuhamedow was among candidates elected to the People's Council as a member from Ahal province. He reportedly received 100% of votes from the electors. On 14 April 2021, Berdimuhamedow was unanimously elected chairman of the People's Council.

Party	Seats	+/–
Independents	45	+45
Democratic Party of Turkmenistan	3	+3
Total	48	+48
Source: CEC

On 14 April 2021, President Berdimuhamedow appointed eight additional members: Kasymguly Babaýew, Guwançmyrat Agaýew, Batyr Orazmämmedow, Dünýägözel Gulmanowa, Merettagan Taganow, Serdar Gaýypow, Merdan Halnazarow, and Çarygeldi Babanyýazow.

== Committees ==
The People's Council prior to 2023 was organised into five committees. Chairmen were elected on 14 April 2021 as follows:

Committee	Chairman	Deputy Chair
Protection of Human Rights and Freedoms	Merettagan Taganow	Dünýägözel Gulmanowa
Economics, Finance, and Social Policy	Guwançmyrat Agaýew	Merdan Halnazarow
Science, Education, Digital System, Sports and Culture	Bahar Seýidowa	
Regional Development, Environmental Protection, and Agroindustrial Policy	Çarygeldi Babanyýazow	Batyr Orazmämmedow
International Affairs	Mähri Bäşimowa	

== See also ==
- Assembly of Turkmenistan
- National Council of Turkmenistan
- Politics of Turkmenistan
