= Magtymguly Avenue =

Avenue in Ashgabat, Turkmenistan

- Native name: Magtymguly şaýoly (Turkmen)
- Former name(s): Merv Prospect (1881-1890?); Kuropatkin Prospect (1890?-1924); Freedom Prospect (1924-1953); Stalin Prospect (1953-1961); Freedom Prospect (1961-1991)
- Namesake: Magtymguly Pyragy
- Maintained by: City of Ashgabat
- Location: Ashgabat, Turkmenistan

Magtymguly Avenue (Turkmen: Magtymguly şaýoly) is an avenue in Ashgabat, Turkmenistan. It is considered to be the longest and most prominent avenue in the capital.

== Origins and description ==
When it was originally created in the early 1880s, Magtymguly Avenue, then named Merv Prospect (Russian: Мервский проспект), ran through the entire city and then merged with the road leading to Merv. It was subsequently renamed Kuropatkin Prospect (Russian: Куропаткинский проспект) in honor of General Aleksey Kuropatkin. Later, during the Soviet period, the avenue was known as Freedom Prospect (Russian: проспект Свободы), on which were hosted military and civilian parades on the occasion of many holidays, with most being held on Revolution Day (November 7), Victory Day (May 9), and International Workers' Day (May 1). From 1953 to 1961, following Joseph Stalin's death, the street was named Stalin Prospect (Russian: проспект Сталина). During the period of Niyazov's rule when Ashgabat streets were assigned four-digit numbers, Magtymguly was given the number 2033.

In 1971, a monument designed by architects V. Vysotin and V. Kutumov to the 16th century Turkmen poet Magtymguly Pyragy (who would later become the avenue's namesake), was installed on the avenue on the site of the demolished Bahá'í temple. Following the dissolution of the USSR in December 1991, the thoroughfare was immediately renamed Magtymguly Avenue in honor of Magtymguly Pyragy by order of President Saparmurat Niyazov. Over the next two to three years, a large fountain was installed on the avenue, and maple and acacia trees also appeared along its path. On this avenue in October 1992 the first Turkmen Independence Day Parade took place, which saw troops of the Ashgabat Garrison of the newly formed Armed Forces of Turkmenistan march past the reviewing stand from which President Niyazov observed the parade.

== Landmarks and Buildings along the avenue ==
- State Russian Drama Theatre named after Pushkin
- Turkmen State Institute of Transport and Communications
- Main Drama Theater named by Saparmurat Turkmenbashi
- State Circus of Turkmenistan
- Ashgabat Cinema
- Inspiration Alley
- Ashgabat Park
- Ministry of Internal Affairs
- Ministry of National Security
- State Border Service
- "Gul Zemin" Mall
- "Tashkent" Park
- Turkmen-Turkish Commercial Bank
- Ashgabat Vine Facility
- Cultural Center of Iran
- Central State Archive of Turkmenistan
- Institute of the Caspian Sea
- U.S Embassy
- Ashgabat Brewery
- Central Physiology Scientific and Clinical Hospital
- Bayram Han Park

=== Monuments ===
- Alabay Statue

== See also ==
- Archabil Avenue
- Bitarap Turkmenistan Avenue
- Saparmurat Turkmenbashi Avenue
- Independence Square
- Galkynysh Square
