= Durdy Bayramov =

Turkmen academician and artist (1938–2014)

- Durdy Baýramow
- Born: Durdy Bayramov; 14 April 1938; Baýramaly, Turkmen SSR, USSR (now Turkmenistan)
- Died: 14 February 2014 (aged 75); Ashgabat, Turkmenistan
- Education: Shota Rustaveli Turkmen State College of Arts; Surikov Art Institute
- Occupations: Academician; artist
- Known for: Painting; works on paper
- Movement: Realism
- Spouse: Dunyagozel "Gozel" Bayramova

Durdy Bayramov (Turkmen: Durdy Baýramow, Cyrillic: Дурды Байрамов; 14 April 1938 – 14 February 2014) was a Turkmen academician and artist who was awarded the highest honorary title in his country: "People's Artist of Turkmen SSR". In his native Turkmen language, Durdy Bayramov's name is simply "Durdy Bayram" (without the Slavic-style "ov" suffix added to Russify names during the Soviet era). The name "Bayram" means "celebration" in Turkic languages.

== Early life and education ==
Bayramov was born in Baýramaly in the Turkmen Soviet Socialist Republic, then part of the Soviet Union, on April 14, 1938. He lost both parents at a young age and lived as a homeless child before being placed in an orphanage in Serdar (then known as Kyzyl-Arvat), where he was raised. Growing up, Bayramov endured starvation and the many hardships that accompanied World War II and the post-war devastation. Later, he benefited from the guidance of exceptional teachers who recognized his talent and supported the young artist in his efforts to become a professional painter. His first art teacher was Gennadiy Brusentsov, a Russian artist who taught at the Shota Rustaveli Turkmen Art College in Ashgabat. Bayramov and Brusentsov developed a lifelong friendship, with Brusentsov acting as Bayramov’s mentor over the years. Brusentsov’s portrait of a young Bayramov, titled Young Soccer Player, is in the collection of the State Tretyakov Gallery in Moscow. Bayramov painted three significant portraits of his teacher, with the most famous one being Portrait of My First Teacher, created in 1997-98.

Another great influence on Durdy Bayramov’s life and artistic career was art instructor Dmitry Mochalsky, his professor at the prestigious Surikov Art Institute in Moscow, which Bayramov attended between 1959 and 1965. Mochalsky was a recipient of the highest honorary title in arts in the former Soviet Union—People’s Artist of the USSR—and was widely respected for his “ability to highlight the essential, while setting aside the extraneous details.” He passed that approach on to many of his students, including Durdy Bayramov.

== Career ==
=== 1960s ===
Upon completion of his formal education in 1965, Bayramov joined the USSR Union of Artists and began his career as a professional artist. The landscape genre was the first to captivate Durdy Bayramov. Many of his early landscape works (some dating to his student years) earned high praise from critics. His celebrated painting Peaceful Land (1969) is considered a classic example of Turkmen landscape painting.

In 1966, Bayramov married his beloved muse, Dunyagozel “Gozel” Ilyasova, who would be one of his most frequently painted subjects and remain an inspiration for his work throughout his life. Bayramov devoted to her an entire series of works on paper titled Gozel, which includes 53 portraits of Gozel and four flower drawings dedicated to her.

From 1965–1968, Bayramov served as an art instructor at the Shota Rustaveli Turkmen State College of Arts in Ashgabat.

=== 1970s ===
Bayramov’s first major artistic honours arrived when he was named winner of the Turkmen SSR Lenin Komsomol prize in 1970 and of the USSR in 1972. In 1971, he completed what is considered the first Turkmen self-portrait, a work formerly held in the collections of the USSR Union of Artists in Moscow.

During this time, Bayramov pioneered the Second World War as a theme among Turkmen painters. His painting Frontline Assistance captured the deep patriotism of ordinary Turkmen women willing to sacrifice their most prized possessions to help soldiers. Another theme developed by Bayramov during this period was the process of making Turkmen carpets. This theme is seen in his famous work titled Turkmen Carpet Makers (1971), which depicts women at work in a carpet factory. This masterpiece of Soviet-era Turkmen art was first exhibited at the State Museum of Oriental Art in Moscow in 1971 and was later acquired by the State Tretyakov Gallery in 1979.

From 1971 until 1973, eager to assist up-and-coming artists, Bayramov returned to his position as art instructor at the Shota Rustaveli Turkmen State College of Arts in Ashgabat.

In the mid-1970s, Bayramov embarked on what was to become his most celebrated series, Cultural Figures. This series contains portraits of individuals recognized by Bayramov as having made important contributions to Turkmen cultural heritage during the late twentieth and early twenty-first centuries. The creation of Cultural Figures would span more than four decades and result in more than 150 individual portraits.

=== 1980s ===
In 1980, Bayramov was named an Honoured Art Worker of the Turkmen SSR, and in 1984 he was awarded second prize and a Laureate Diploma for the contest commemorating the 60th anniversary of the Turkmen SSR and Communist Party of the TSSR. He remained highly productive throughout the 1980s despite personal hardships associated with perestroika (ca. 1985–1991), which caused a scarcity of basic household goods and food products for many people. Bayramov persevered and worked tirelessly, trying to lose himself in his art. He continued to expand his artistic repertoire through an increased focus on portraits and still lifes, especially flowers.

In 1985, Bayramov began work on one of his most celebrated thematic compositions—his monumental tribute to the great Spanish artists of the past titled Golden Mist. This work would not be completed until 2001.

Throughout the 1980s, Bayramov’s popularity and renown grew as a result of numerous solo exhibitions, including those held in Moscow, Russia (1980, 1984); Berlin, German Democratic Republic (1981); Ulyanovsk, Russia (1984); Ashgabat, Turkmenistan (two exhibitions in 1986 alone); and Budapest, Hungary (1986).

=== 1990s ===
Following continued critical and popular success at home and abroad, in 1991 Bayramov was awarded the highest artistic title in his home country: People’s Artist of Turkmenistan.

In 1998, Bayramov was appointed an Academician of the National Academy of Arts of Kyrgyzstan, along with fellow artists Suhrob Kurbanov, Tahir Salahov, Turgunbai Sadykov, and Erbolat Tolepbai. In conjunction with the presentation of this award, Bayramov contributed works to the International Exhibition of the Academicians of Kyrgyzstan at the Academy of Arts in Bishkek.

=== 2000s ===
Throughout the 2000s, Bayramov continued to travel and work extensively both within Turkmenistan and around the world. This included trips to Ukraine, where he held a solo exhibition in the Kyiv National Museum of Russian Art in 2000, Russia (2003), Thailand (2004), Turkey (2002 and 2004), Maldives (2004), the United Arab Emirates (multiple trips between 2003 and 2007), Netherlands (2008), Italy (2009), Belgium (2010), and France (2010). In 2008, Bayramov celebrated his 70th birthday and his 50-year milestone as an artist with two retrospective exhibitions of his work in Ashgabat, Turkmenistan.

Based on his lifetime artistic achievements and contributions to the culture of Turkmenistan, in 2008 Bayramov was awarded the “For the Love of the Motherland” medal, presented to him by the President of Turkmenistan.

=== 2010s ===
Bayramov continued his prolific artistic output into the 2010s, creating more than ninety oil paintings between 2010 and 2014.

In 2012, Bayramov spent six months in Canada where he created a well-known series of landscape paintings titled Canadian Autumn. In 2014, Bayramov’s paintings were displayed in Toronto, Ontario, Canada, marking the first exhibition of his work in North America. An inaugural exhibition of Bayramov’s photographs took place in Toronto in 2015. Titled Through the Eyes of Durdy Bayramov: Turkmen Village Life, 1960s-80s, the exhibition featured black-and-white photographs and was a Featured Exhibition in Scotiabank's CONTACT Photography Festival. The corresponding catalogue was published by the Durdy Bayramov Art Foundation in association with the Asian Cultural History Program of the Smithsonian Institution.

In 2015, a solo exhibition of Durdy Bayramov’s works was held at the World Bank Art Program in Washington, DC, with the support of the Embassy of Turkmenistan in the US. The opening of this exhibition coincided with celebrations of the 24th anniversary of Independence and the 20th anniversary of the Neutrality of Turkmenistan.

== Artistic style ==
Durdy Bayramov created more than 5,000 artworks during his prolific career, including oil paintings and works on paper. He was also a passionate photographer, though he considered this activity a part of his artistic process and never attempted to exhibit his photographs. For this reason his considerable photographic work would not be exhibited until after his death.

Bayramov worked extensively across four genres: portraits, still lifes, landscapes, and thematic compositions, though he has long been best known for his portraits. As early as 1975, it was noted that “although he paints genre pictures and landscapes, one could say that portraiture claims his special attention.” Among his contemporaries, he was considered to be the “unsurpassed master of the portrait genre.” Bayramov penetrated deep into the character and inner life of his subjects to reflect their diverse personalities on canvas, while emphasizing their best qualities. Bayramov said he did this by “always looking for that special spark that exists within each person.” He sought to harmonize the contextual discoveries of Impressionism, the attention to detail of Classical Realism, and Turkmenistan’s rich artistic traditions. Bayramov found inspiration in people from all walks of life, regardless of their social, economic, or ethnic background. His subjects include a wide variety of individuals, from villagers to scientists, strangers to family members, children to seniors. Bayramov’s empathetic nature and close rapport with his subjects helps to explain his success in this genre.

Although Bayramov is best known for his portraiture, his work in the still life and landscape genres is also highly respected. Flowers held a special place in Bayramov’s still life works. He was particularly passionate about painting the rich colours and textures of the red poppies that carpet the foothills of Turkmenistan every spring. The depiction of fruit in Bayramov’s still lifes symbolizes the abundance of nature and his love for his native land’s fruit in particular. He often depicted apples, melons, pomegranates, etc. arranged on traditional Turkmen carpets, which feature göl woven motifs and vibrant colours, and on Turkmen ornamental felts called ''keche''.

== Foundation ==
Durdy Bayramov Art Foundation
- Founded: January 26, 2015
- Founder: Keyik Bayramova
- Location: 2647 Bayview Avenue, Toronto, Ontario, Canada

Durdy Bayramov Art Foundation is a non-profit organization located in Toronto, Ontario, Canada, dedicated to celebrating the life and legacy of the Turkmen artist Durdy Bayramov (1938-2014). The Foundation is committed to building on Bayramov’s advocacy for art education by expanding knowledge and art appreciation through collections-based research, publication, as well as facilitating access for scholars and the general public to the collections, library, and archives of the Bayramov Museum.

The Durdy Bayramov Art Foundation was established in 2015 in Toronto, Canada. The headquarters of the Foundation is located within the building that Durdy Bayramov lived in during his six-month of residency in Canada in 2012, giving this location special significance. The Foundation’s Board of Directors includes Durdy Bayramov’s wife and four daughters. The Foundation’s logo features a stylized version of Durdy Bayramov’s signature.

The Durdy Bayramov Art Foundation celebrates the life and legacy of Durdy Bayramov, an orphan-turned-passionate advocate for young artists, through cultural programming and art initiatives. Reflecting his commitment to supporting aspiring artists—including providing art supplies to those unable to afford them—the Foundation prioritizes youth programming and operates a scholarship program for promising young artists who lack other opportunities to pursue their artistic interests.

The Durdy Bayramov Art Foundation actively engages the public through exhibitions, events, and educational outreach activities. This includes educational programs, such as a collaboration in 2015 with the Community MicroSkills Development Centre in Toronto in carrying out Language Instruction for Newcomers to Canada (LINC) classes that utilized art to help familiarize recent immigrants to Canada with Canadian culture and the English language. The Foundation has also collaborated with the Smithsonian Institution’s Asian Cultural History Program, the Embassy of Turkmenistan in Washington, D.C., and the Textile Museum of Canada in carrying out lectures on Turkmen art, the history and cultural heritage of Turkmenistan, and Durdy Bayramov’s life and significance in the art world.

In 2015 the Foundation held its inaugural exhibition at the Bayramov Museum, titled Through the Eyes of Durdy Bayramov: Turkmen Village Life, 1960s-80s. This was the world’s first exhibition of Bayramov’s black-and-white photographs and was a Featured Exhibition in the CONTACT Photography Festival. The corresponding exhibition catalogue was published by the Durdy Bayramov Art Foundation in association with the Asian Cultural History Program, Smithsonian Institution.

The Foundation also collaborates with external institutions in producing exhibitions. The most recent solo exhibitions have taken place in: The Embassy of Turkmenistan in Washington, DC, February 19 – March 8, 2016. The World Bank headquarters in Washington, DC, carried out with the World Bank Art Program, November 17–30, 2015.

== Death and legacy ==
In February 2014, Durdy Bayramov was diagnosed with liver cancer. He died on February 14, 2014. He is survived by his spouse, Gozel Bayramova, four daughters, and seven grandchildren.

In 2015, the Durdy Bayramov Art Foundation was established in Toronto, with the aim of advancing Bayramov's legacy in art and education. To further this mission, the Foundation opened the Bayramov Museum. Located in Toronto, the museum contains the world's largest collection of Bayramov's works and hosts permanent and temporary exhibitions of Bayramov's art.

Durdy Bayramov is widely recognized as one of Central Asia's most important painters. His art can be found in many private collections, as well as in museums, galleries, and cultural institutions around the world, including:

- Durdy Bayramov Art Foundation, Toronto, Ontario, Canada
- Dresden Gallery, Dresden, Germany
- Museum of Fine Arts, Ashgabat, Turkmenistan
- Museum of Fine Arts, Mary, Turkmenistan
- Museum of Fine Arts, Turkmenabat, Turkmenistan
- Museum of Fine Arts, Balkanabat, Turkmenistan
- The State Tretyakov Gallery, Moscow, Russia
- The State Museum of Oriental Art, Moscow, Russia
- Museum of Fine Arts of Karelian Republic, Petrozavodsk, Russia
- Museum of Fine Arts, Komsomolsk-on-Amur, Russia
- Primorye State Art Gallery, Vladivostok, Russia
- Tyumen Regional Museum of Fine Arts, Tyumen, Russia
- The T. Sadykov Museum of the National Academy of Arts, Bishkek, Kyrgyzstan
- The State Museum of Arts of Uzbekistan, Tashkent, Uzbekistan
- The Kyiv National Museum of Russian Art, Kyiv, Ukraine
- The Lugansk Regional Museum of Fine Arts, Lugansk, Ukraine
- Museum of Fine Art, Kmitov, Ukraine

== Solo exhibitions ==
- 2016 Durdy Bayramov, Toronto, Ontario, Canada. “Classical Turkmen Music Days in Canada”. Ismaili Centre, Toronto
- 2016 Durdy Bayramov, Ashgabat, Turkmenistan. Turkmen State Institute of Transport and Communications, with support of the Ministry of Culture, Ministry of Education, and museums in Ashgabat (within a framework of the "Year of Honoring Heritage, Transforming the Motherland")
- 2016 Durdy Bayramov, Washington, DC, United States. Embassy of Turkmenistan in Washington, D.C.
- 2015 Durdy Bayramov, Washington, DC, United States. World Bank Art Program
- 2015 Durdy Bayramov, Toronto, Ontario, Canada. “Through the Eyes of Durdy Bayramov: Turkmen Village Life, 1960s-80s” (world’s first exhibition of Durdy Bayramov’s photography)
- 2014 Durdy Bayramov, Toronto, Ontario, Canada. “My life belongs to art and art belongs to the people”
- 2013 Durdy Bayramov, Ashgabat, Turkmenistan (exhibition devoted to the 75th birthday of Durdy Bayramov)
- 2008 Durdy Bayramov, Exhibition Hall of the Artists Union, Ashgabat, Turkmenistan (exhibition celebrating Durdy Bayramov’s 70th birthday and a 50-year milestone as an artist)
- 2008 Durdy Bayramov, Museum of Fine Arts, Ashgabat, Turkmenistan
- 2003 Durdy Bayramov, Ashgabat, Turkmenistan
- 2000 Durdy Bayramov, Kyiv National Museum of Russian Art, Kyiv, Ukraine
- 1998 Durdy Bayramov, Ashgabat, Turkmenistan
- 1986 Durdy Bayramov, Budapest, Hungary
- 1986 Durdy Bayramov, Ashkhabad, Turkmen Soviet Socialist Republic. “Ashkhabad – Kunya Urgench – Ashkhabad”
- 1986 Durdy Bayramov, Ashkhabad, Turkmen Soviet Socialist Republic
- 1984 Durdy Bayramov, Ulyanovsk, Russia
- 1981 Durdy Bayramov, Berlin, German Democratic Republic
- 1980 Durdy Bayramov, Moscow, Russia
- 1978 Durdy Bayramov, Ashkhabad, Turkmen Soviet Socialist Republic
- 1975 Durdy Bayramov, Kyiv, Ukraine
- 1971 Durdy Bayramov, Halle (Saale), German Democratic Republic
- 1970 Durdy Bayramov, Ashkhabad, Turkmen Soviet Socialist Republic. “Through India”

== Awards and Distinctions ==
- 2011 Jubilee medal “20th Anniversary of Independence of Turkmenistan”
- 2009 Byashim Nurali Prize, Artists Union of Turkmenistan
- 2008 President of Turkmenistan's medal “For the Love of the Motherland”
- 1998 Academician of the National Academy of Arts of the Kyrgyz Republic
- 1991 People’s Artist of Turkmen SSR
- 1984 Second Prize and Laureate Diploma for the contest commemorating the 60th anniversary of the Turkmen SSR and Communist Party of TSSR
- 1980 Honoured Art Worker of Turkmen SSR
- 1978-1979 Second Prize and Laureate Diploma for the art contest of Turkmen SSR painters
- 1975 Third Prize and Laureate Diploma for the nationwide contest entitled “Women’s Portrait”, Moscow, USSR
- 1974 Gold Medal, Exhibition of Achievements of National Economy (VDNKh), Moscow, USSR
- 1974 Honorary Certificate, Supreme Council and Council of Ministers of Turkmen SSR
- 1974 Second Prize and Laureate Diploma for the contest commemorating the 50th anniversary of the Turkmen SSR
- 1972 USSR Lenin Komsomol Prize; Laureate Second Prize and Laureate Diploma, National Exhibition of Young Artists of USSR
- 1970 Turkmen SSR Lenin Komsomol Prize
- 1965 Honorary Certificate, Supreme Council of Turkmen SSR
