= Third inauguration of Gurbanguly Berdimuhamedow =

Inauguration of Turkmeni president

Inauguration of Gurbanguly Berdimuhamedow
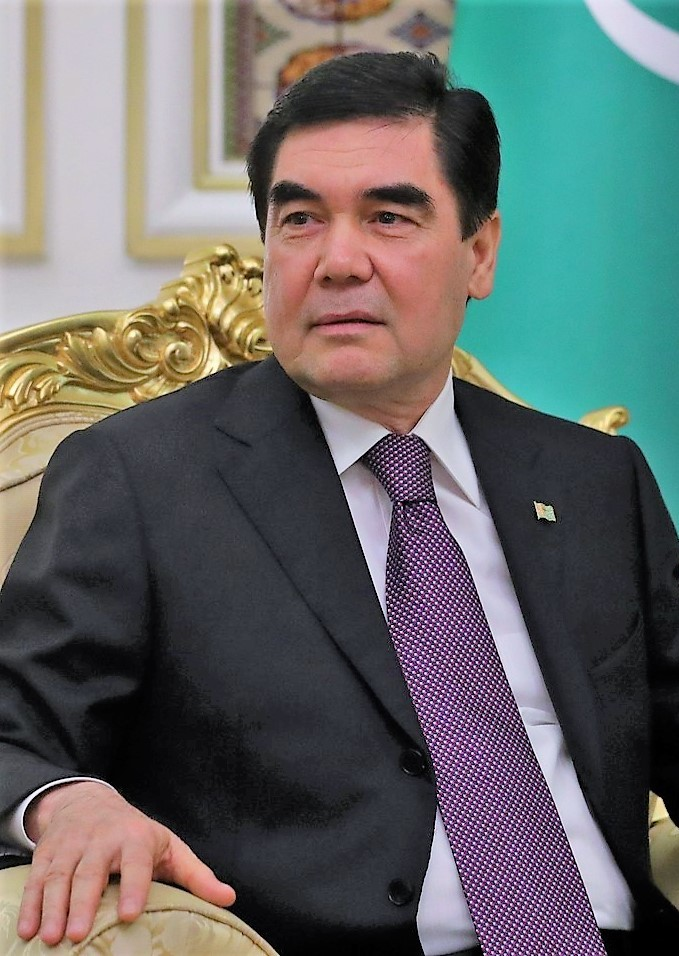
- Date: 17 February 2017
- Location: Ruhyýet Palace, Ashgabat
- Participants: President-elect Gurbanguly Berdimuhamedow

The third inauguration of Gurbanguly Berdimuhamedow as the President of Turkmenistan took place on Friday, 17 February 2017 inside the halls of the Ruhyýet Palace, in Ashgabat, Turkmenistan. It marked the commencement of the third seven-year term of Gurbanguly Berdimuhamedow. He secured a third term in office by winning 97.69 percent of the vote in the national elections that took place on February 12, 2017.

== Official ceremony ==
=== First part ===
The State Flag of Turkmenistan, the Presidential Standard, the Constitution of Turkmenistan and the Quran were carried into the hall by the soldiers of the Independent Honor Guard Battalion of the Ministry of Defence to the sounds of marching music. Then, Berdimuhamedow was invited to the podium to take the oath of office.

=== Final part ===
The inauguration ceremony ended with the president's assumption as Supreme Commander in Chief of the Armed Forces. Berdimuhamedow left the palace to receive the guard of honour at the Oguzkhan Presidential Palace. After receiving the report from the commander of the guard of honour, the National anthem of Turkmenistan was played, and a 21-gun salute sounded. The troops of the Armed Forces then took the National oath of Turkmenistan. The inaugural military parade then took place on Galkynysh Square near the presidential palace. After reviewing the parade, Berdimuhamedow, proceeded to the palace to assume his duties as head of state.

== Congratulations from foreign leaders ==
The president was congratulated by foreign leaders such as President of Russia Vladimir Putin.
