= Ruhyýet Palace =

Palace in the capital city of Ashgabat in Turkmenistan

- Ruhyýet köşgi
- Ruhyýet Palace during Independence Day celebrations
- Interactive map of the Ruhyýet Palace area
- Alternative names: Palace of Congresses and Arts, Rukhiyet Palace

General information
- Type: Congress and cultural center
- Location: Ashgabat, Turkmenistan
- Coordinates: 37.9325°N 58.3778°E
- Construction started: 1995
- Completed: 1999
- Inaugurated: 2000
- Client: Government of Turkmenistan

Design and construction
- Main contractor: Bouygues

Ruhyýet Palace (Ruhyýet köşgi), also known as the Palace of Congresses and Arts, is the seat of government in Ashgabat, the capital of Turkmenistan. The palace serves as a venue for official state events, international forums, meetings, and presidential inaugurations.

== History ==
The palace was commissioned by President Saparmurat Niyazov and constructed between 1995 and 1999 by the French construction company Bouygues, which has been responsible for numerous major building projects in Turkmenistan since the country's independence in 1991. The palace was inaugurated in 2000.

In 2008, the largest fountain complex in Turkmenistan was constructed in front of the palace.

== Architecture ==
The palace is located at Independence Square in central Ashgabat, adjacent to the Oguzkhan Presidential Palace, the Mejlis (parliament) building, and the Ministry of Defense headquarters. The building features a white marble facade, a signature characteristic of Ashgabat's urban landscape, which holds the Guinness World Record for the highest concentration of white marble-clad buildings.

The design combines traditional Turkmen motifs with modern architectural elements. The interior features lavish halls with intricate decorations, showcasing Turkmenistan's cultural heritage through traditional art, carpets, and ornamental designs. Among the palace's notable features is a giant handwoven Turkmen carpet called "President", created in 1998, which measures 294 square metres (14 × 21 m) and weighs 1,105 kilograms.

== Functions ==
=== Presidential inaugurations ===
The palace serves as the traditional venue for presidential inaugurations. Notable ceremonies held at Ruhyýet Palace include:

- The third inauguration of Gurbanguly Berdimuhamedow on 17 February 2017
- The inauguration of Serdar Berdimuhamedow on 19 March 2022, marking the transfer of power from his father

During inauguration ceremonies, the president-elect takes the oath of office on the Constitution of Turkmenistan and the Quran, and is presented with the presidential badge of office by Turkmen elders.

=== International summits ===
The palace has hosted major international gatherings, including sessions of the Caspian Summit. The first summit of the Caspian littoral states was held in Ashgabat on 23–24 April 2002, attended by the presidents of Azerbaijan, Iran, Kazakhstan, Russia, and Turkmenistan. The sixth Caspian Summit was also held in Ashgabat on 29 June 2022.

=== State events ===
The palace hosts sessions of the Dovlet Maslahaty (State Council) and other major governmental meetings. Regional Ruhyýet Palaces in the cities of Türkmenbaşy, Daşoguz, Türkmenabat, and Mary are connected via digital systems to participate in national forums held at the main palace in Ashgabat.

The palace also hosts exhibitions, concerts, cultural celebrations, and international conferences, including the annual International Oil and Gas Conference.

== Depiction on currency ==
The palace has been depicted on multiple Turkmenistani manat banknotes. It appears on the reverse of the 10,000 manat note from the 2000 series, alongside the Neutrality Monument and national coat of arms. The palace is also depicted on the reverse of the 20 manat banknote from the 2009 series, which features a portrait of Gorogly, the hero of Turkmen epics, on the obverse.

== Gallery ==
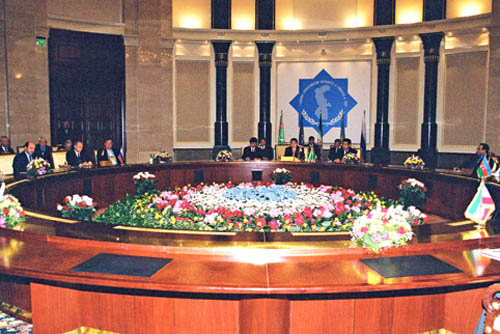
Meeting of the heads of Caspian states, 2002

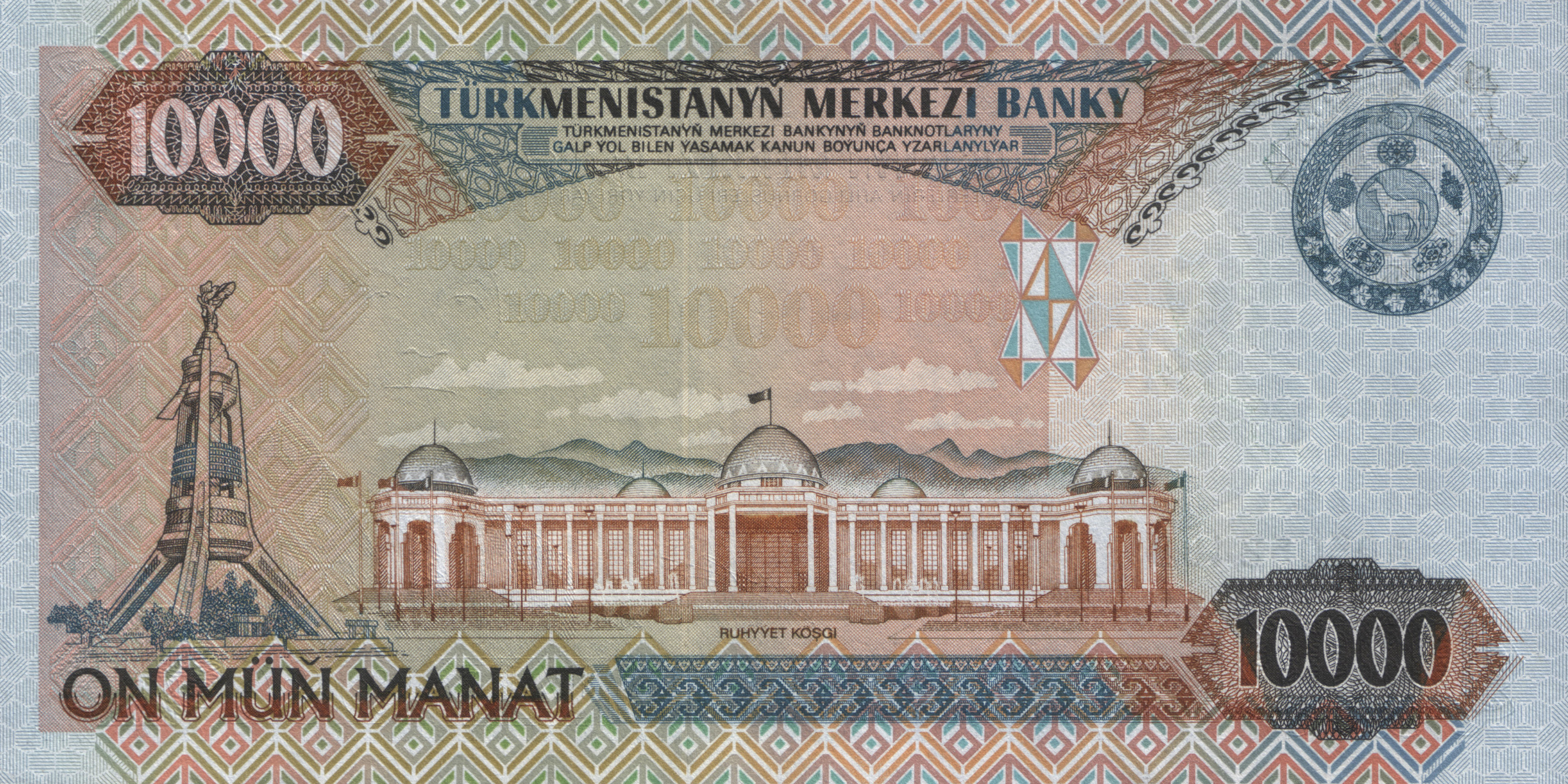
10,000 manat banknote (2000)

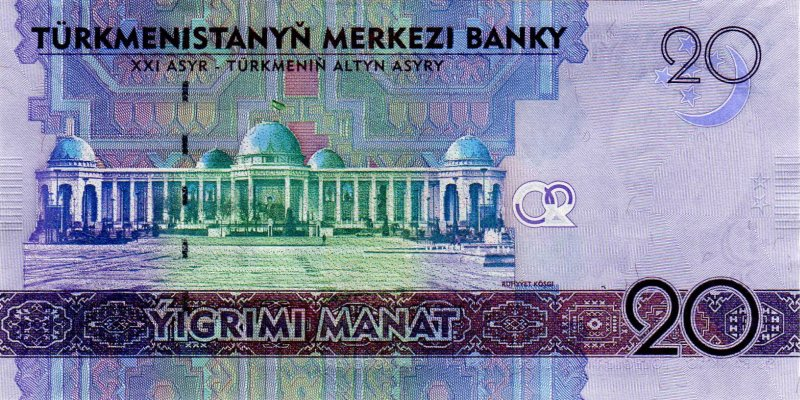
20 manat banknote (2012)

== See also ==
- Architecture in Central Asia
- Oguzkhan Presidential Palace
- Independence Square, Ashgabat
- Bouygues
- Caspian Summit
- Turkmen Carpet Museum
