= State Library of Turkmenistan =

National library of Turkmenistan

Coordinates: 37°56′11″N 58°22′43″E

- Döwlet kitaphanasy
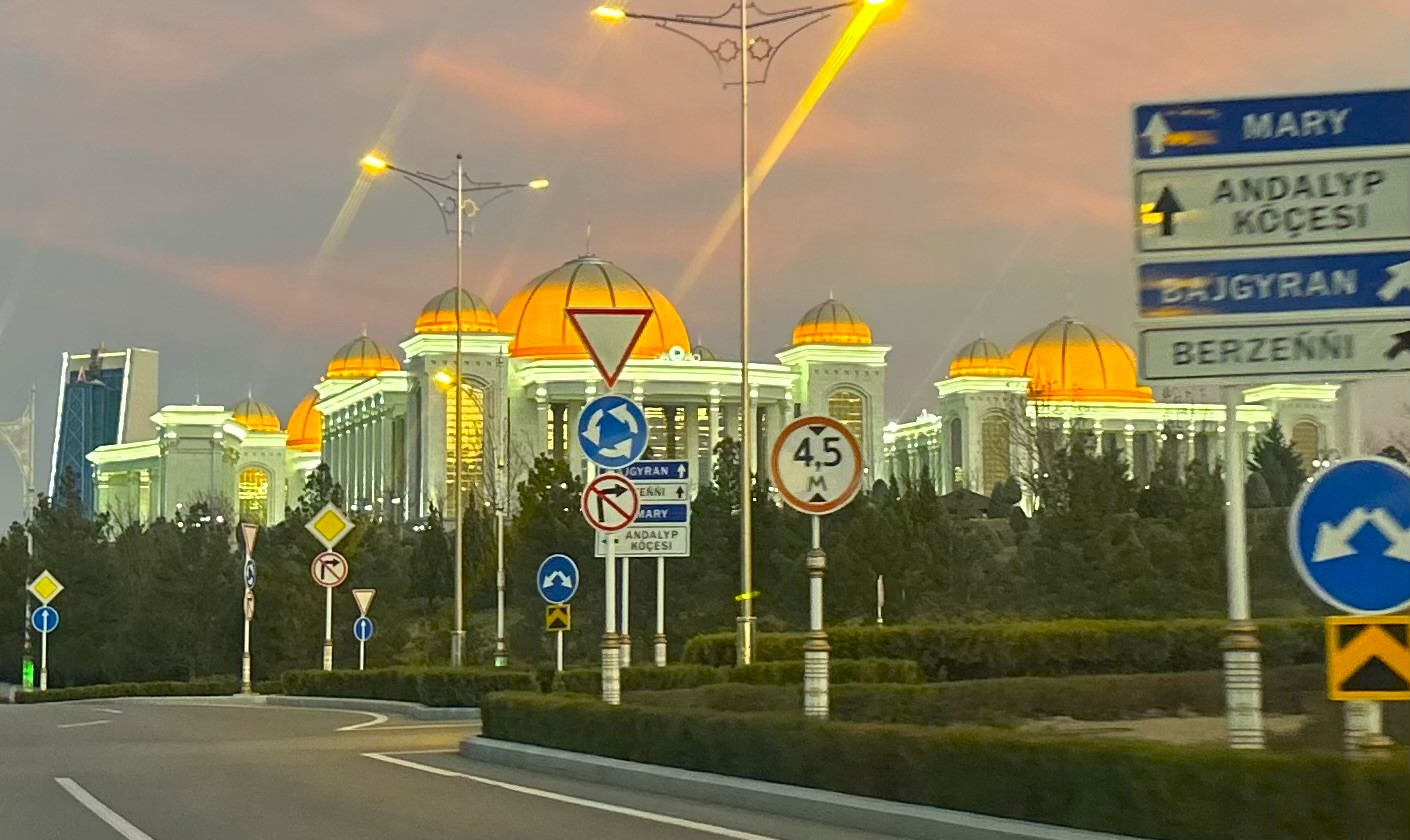
- Location: Archabil Avenue 12, Ashgabat, 744000, Turkmenistan
- Type: National library
- Established: 1895 (131 years ago)

Collection
- Items collected: Books, journals, newspapers, magazines, sound and music recordings, patents, databases, maps, stamps, prints, drawings and manuscripts
- Size: 5 600 000

Access and use
- Access requirements: Registration

Other information
- Website: https://dovletkitaphana.gov.tm/

The State Library of Turkmenistan (Turkmen: Döwlet kitaphanasy) officially named the State Library of the State Cultural Center of Turkmenistan (Turkmen: Türkmenistanyň Döwlet medeniýet merkeziniň Döwlet kitaphanasy) is the national library of Turkmenistan, located in Ashgabat and founded in 1895. The library is located on Archabil Avenue.

== Names ==
- Transcaspian Regional Public Library (under the Russian Empire)
- State Republican Library of the Turkmen SSR named after Karl Marx (under the USSR)
- Andalib National Library (1992-1997)
- National Library named after the Great Saparmurat Turkmenbashi (1997-2013)
- State Library of Turkmenistan (since 2013)

== History ==
=== Turkmen Soviet Socialist Republic ===
The library was founded in 1892 and began serving its first readers in May 1895.

The name of the library changed during different historical periods. In 1976, a new specialized building in Ashkhabad was built for it.

=== Turkmenistan ===
On December 24, 1992, the library was granted the status of a national institution.

As of 2006, the library had a collection of 5 million items including books, maps, manuscripts, dissertations, journals, and newspapers; there were about 22,000 members. Book exhibitions were regularly held both in its premises and provincial libraries. Yet, the library played an insignificant role in society, and as of 2007, remained the only Central Asian library not to join the Library Assembly of Eurasia.

In 2005, the library received funds to replace its card catalogs with an online public access catalog (OPAC); as of 2012, no progress has been made. Internet literacy among librarians remained low, as of 2012. Statistics on the publication of books in Turkmenistan remain unavailable, and the national bibliography has been stale for years.

On February 16, 2007, a complex of new buildings was commissioned in Ashgabat, which includes the State Cultural Centre of Turkmenistan . This complex, consisting of three parts, houses the new building of the State Library. The new State Library building is equipped with facilities to serve up to 1,100 readers simultaneously.

On April 25, 2013, the National Library under the Ministry of Culture of Turkmenistan was renamed to the State Library of the State Cultural Center.

Since 2016, the centralized libraries under the Ministry of Culture of Turkmenistan have been operating a Unified Electronic Library System.

== Inventory ==
The State Library of Turkmenistan currently holds over 5.6 million items in its collection and operates 17 departments. The building houses books, journals, newspapers, magazines, sound and music recordings, patents, databases, maps, stamps, prints, drawings and manuscripts.

The State Library of Turkmenistan is also the official and central repository of the country.

== Usage ==
State Library of Turkmenistan in 2009

Any Turkmen and foreign citizen may get a reader card by submitting their identification documents such as passport or Birth certificate. It is permitted to temporarily borrow books to read at home.

== See also ==
- List of national libraries

== Links ==
- Official website
