= Turkmenistan Cultural Centre =

State Cultural Centre of Turkmenistan
- Döwlet medeniýet merkezi
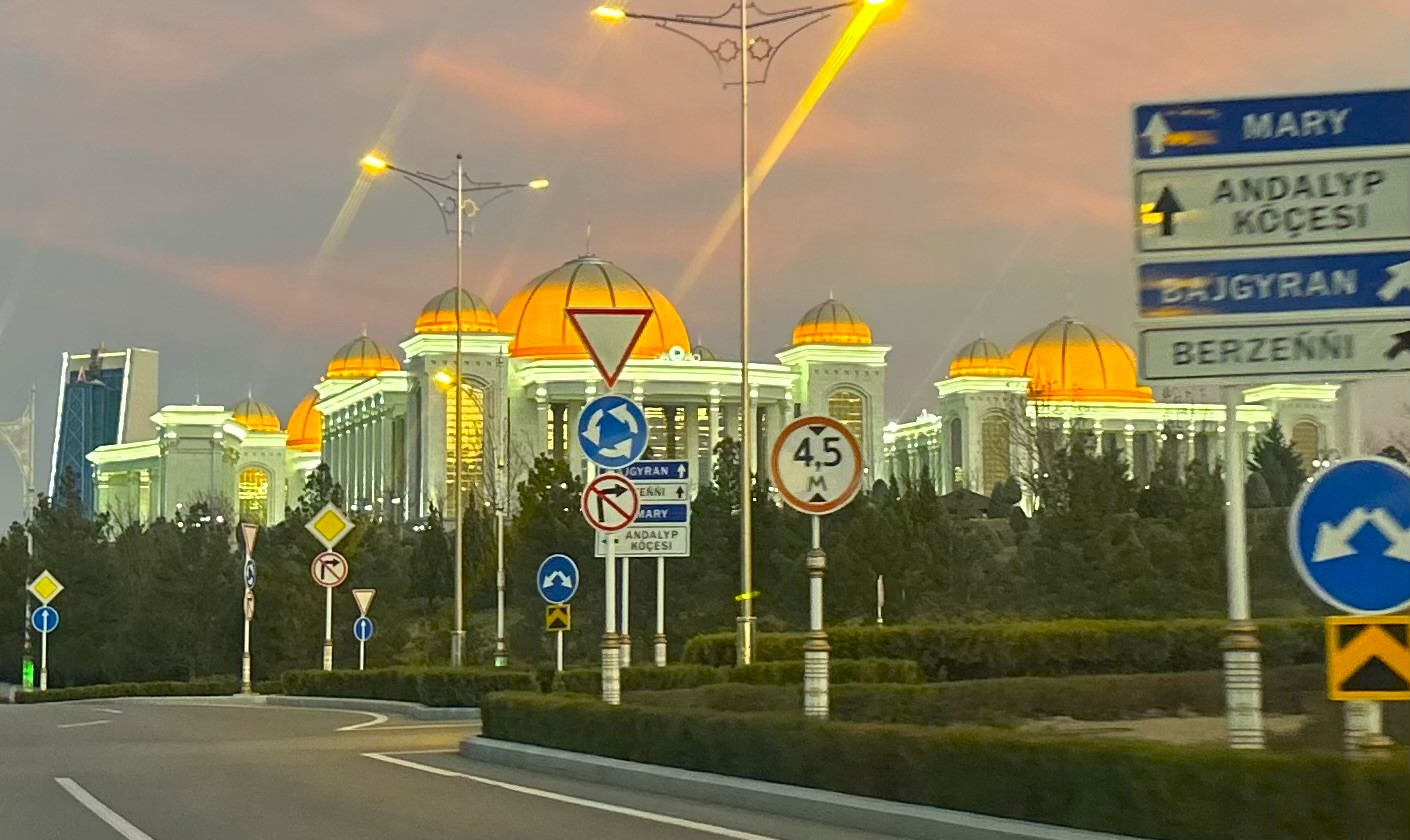
- The State Cultural Centre of Turkmenistan
- Interactive map of the State Cultural Centre of Turkmenistan area
- Former names: State Cultural Centre of Turkmenistan named after Saparmurat Turkmenbashi the Great
- Alternative names: SCCT

General information
- Location: Archabil avenue, Ashgabat, Turkmenistan
- Coordinates: 37.8772°N 58.3822°E
- Completed: 2007

The State Cultural Centre of Turkmenistan (Döwlet medeniýet merkezi) is a multipurpose performance facility in the Ashgabat, Turkmenistan. Located at Archabil avenue, it was founded by the first President of Turkmenistan Saparmurat Niyazov. It is a place for a wide variety of cultural performances. It was opened in 2007. In the past, bore the name of Saparmurat Turkmenbashi the Great.

== Performance and other facilities ==
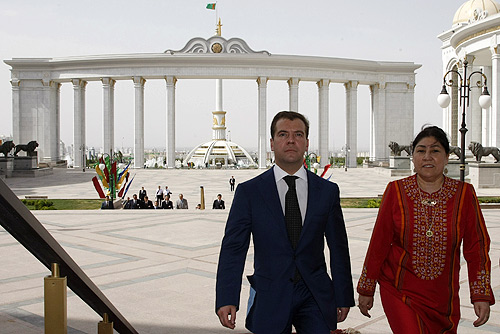
Dmitriy Medvedev in State Cultural Centre of Turkmenistan

State Cultural Centre of Turkmenistan performs educational, museum education and leisure and entertainment functions, conducts activities officially, state and international levels, a variety of political and cultural promotions, international conferences and exhibitions.

In April 2013, the President of Turkmenistan signed a resolution changing the name under the Ministry of Culture of Turkmenistan National Cultural Center of the Great Saparmurat Turkmenbashi, renaming it to the State Cultural Centre of Turkmenistan.

== Structure ==
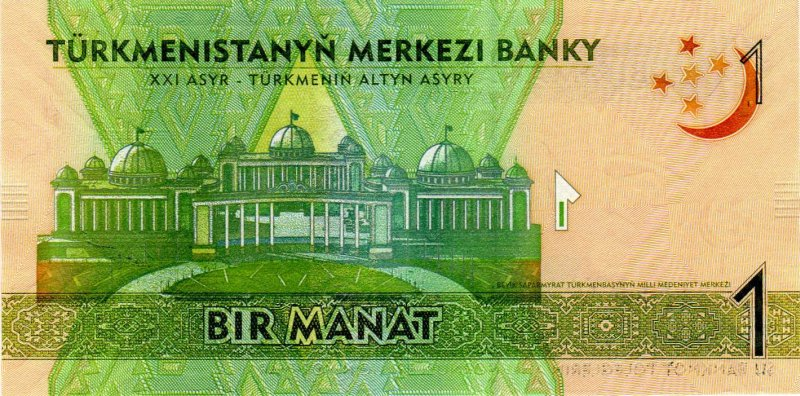
Turkmenistan banknote picturing State Cultural Centre of Turkmenistan

In the structure of the SCCT:

- National Library of Turkmenistan
- The State Museum of the State Cultural Center of Turkmenistan
- Department of the Museum of the first President of Turkmenistan
- Mukam Palace
