= Ashgabat cinema =

Movie theater in Ashgabat

Coordinates: 37°56′58″N 58°22′23″E

- Interactive map of Ashgabat cinema
- Location: Magtymguly avenue 115, Ashgabat
- Type: Movie theater

Construction
- Opened: 2008
- Renovated: 2011

The Ashgabat cinema (Turkmen: Aşgabat kinoteatry) is a movie theater in Ashgabat. The theater is on Magtymguly Avenue near the Kopetdag Stadium. Opened on June 29, 2011, it is the first 3D cinema in Turkmenistan.

== History ==
The initiator of the first 3D-cinema was the President of Turkmenistan. A tender for the construction of the Central Bank of Turkmenistan announced in January 2008.

In September it was announced that the Turkish construction company "Ichkale", commissioned by the state concern "Turkmennebitgazgurlushik" build in the center of Ashgabat new modern cinema. The project cost more than U.S. $20 million. In the future, the facility was taken over by the French construction company Vinci.

The opening ceremony of the building took place on June 29, 2011 with the participation of President of Turkmenistan Gurbanguly Berdimuhamedov.

== Feature ==
In the cinema, two halls, a large (500 seats) and small (70 seats). "Ashgabat" is the first movie theater in Turkmenistan where it is possible to watch movies in digital format 3D. Total area of cinema center is about 4.5 million square meters. The facade of the building is faced with white marble and gray granite and decorated with stained glass. The complex operates an internet cafe, a shop for the sale of books and souvenirs and an outdoor cafe. It is located in front of the main entrance area for special events. In the cinema, demonstrated mainly documentaries about Turkmenistan. There is an unspoken requirement about films exclusively in the Turkmen language.

== Programming and events ==
The cinema predominantly shows new releases.

The cinema often becomes a venue for the Days of Culture of foreign countries.

In November 2024, the cinema became a venue for showing competition films of the Korkut Ata Film Festival of the Turkic World.
