= Amangeldy Hydyr =

Turkmenistani painter (born 1951)

Amangeldy Hydyr (born 1951 in Arapjik, Balkan Province, Turkmenistan) is a Turkmenistani painter.

Hydyr's works are noted for originality and mainly focus on the nature and ancient history of Turkmenistan. Trees and bushes, birds and animals and stonework are common features. His works have been described as having a "style, softness of color spectrum and peculiar individuality of perception of the outer world".

Hydyr became a member of Painters Union of Turkmenistan in 1988 and regularly displays his artwork in international expositions. His work is particularly appreciated in Moscow where he has taken part in many exhibitions including his artwork "My Turkmenistan" (1997) and "In the Karakym desert" (1998). One exhibition in Turkmenistan in 2006 featured some 100 of his paintings at the Exhibition Hall of the Ministry of Culture in Ashgabat. A number of his paintings have been acquired by the Turkmen Museum of Fine Arts and other museums in Balkanabat and some 55 pictures have been purchased in private collections in Turkmenistan, the United States, Russia, Germany and Poland.
