= 1992 Turkmenistan presidential election =

- 21 June 1992
- Registered: 1,887,183
- Turnout: 99.82%
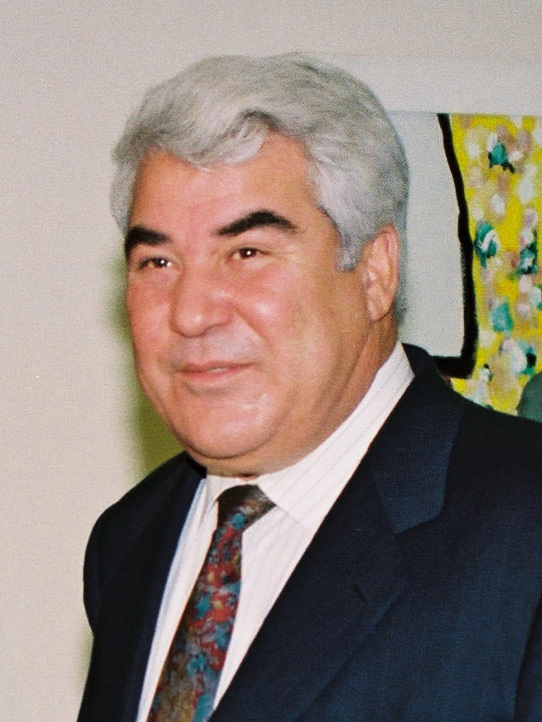
Nominee	Saparmurat Niyazov
Party	TDP
Popular vote	1,874,357
Percentage	99.51%
- Results by region
President before election
Saparmurat Niyazov
TDP
Elected President
Saparmurat Niyazov
TDP

Presidential elections were held in Turkmenistan on 21 June 1992, the first since independence. The sole candidate was Saparmurat Niyazov, who had served as the first Secretary of the Central Committee of the Communist Party of the Turkmen SSR since 21 December 1985. Other candidates were not allowed to participate in the elections.

According to official data, 99.5% of voters voted in favour of Niyazov, with voter turnout at 99.8%.

== Background ==
The post of President of the Turkmenistan SSR was introduced in the second half of 1990, before independence and the official adoption of the new constitution of the independent Turkmenistan. Niyazov had been the only candidate in the October 1990 elections, in which it was reported 98.3% of voters voted for him. After Turkmenistan gained independence as a result of the collapse of the USSR, Niyazov proposed to the Supreme Council that national elections should be held.

== Results ==
Candidate	Party	Votes	%
Saparmurat Niyazov	Democratic Party of Turkmenistan	1,874,357	99.51
Against		9,236	0.49
Total		1,883,593	100.00
Valid votes		1,883,593	99.99
Invalid/blank votes		231	0.01
Total votes		1,883,824	100.00
Registered voters/turnout		1,887,183	99.82
Source: Nohlen et al.

== Aftermath ==
The next presidential elections were due to be held in 1999, but following a referendum on the presidential term in 1994, Niyazov's term of office was extended until 2002. The 2002 elections were never held as Niyazov was declared President for life by the Mejlis of Turkmenistan on 28 December 1999. The next presidential elections were held only in February 2007, after the death of Niyazov.
