= Ashgabat Ice Palace =

Stadium in Turkmenistan

National Olympic Sports Palace
- "Milli olimpiýa sport köşgi" hojalyk jemgyýeti
- Interactive map of National Olympic Sports Palace
- Location: Turkmenistan Ashgabat, Archabil Avenue, 14
- Coordinates: 37.8779°N 58.3750°E
- Capacity: 928
- Field size: 60×30 meters

Construction
- Built: 2006
- Opened: May 2006
- Cost: $21.5 million USD
- Architect: Bouygues

Tenants
- Burgut, Shir, Oguzhan, Alp Arslan

National Olympic Sports Palace or Ashgabat Ice Palace (Milli olimpiýa sport köşgi) is an ice sports arena with a 1000-seat capacity located in the southern part of Ashgabat on Archabil Avenue. It was opened on May 18, 2006. The arena was intended for ice hockey, figure skating, and other ice sports. The building covers an area of about 8,000 m^{2} (86,000 sq ft). Currently, all Ashgabat-based hockey clubs and a figure skating group train at the venue.

== History ==
In November 2024, construction of the Ice Palace began on the southern outskirts of Ashgabat.

In 2006, the French company Bouygues completed the construction of the first Ice Palace in Turkmenistan. The opening ceremony of the Ice Palace was attended by government officials, members of the Parliament of Turkmenistan, ministry heads, leaders of public organizations, ambassadors of accredited diplomatic missions, athletes, and students from Ashgabat universities and schools. A group of famous French figure skaters, including World Vice-Champion Brian Joubert (2006), was invited to participate in the opening ceremony.

Currently, the palace hosts games and training sessions for Ashgabat's hockey teams and the Turkmenistan men's national ice hockey team

== Description ==
The main feature of the sports complex is the ice arena, which meets the European standard for hockey rinks (60 m × 30 m (197 ft × 98 ft)). Up to 150 people can skate at the same time. The arena has seating for 1,000 spectators. The complex includes an ice production facility, a skate sharpening workshop, a sports equipment rental station, and a garage for ice maintenance vehicles with snow-removal equipment.
