= Main Drama Theater (Ashgabat) =

- Baş drama teatry
- Türkmenistanyň Beýik Saparmyrat Türkmenbaşy adyndaky Baş drama teatry
- Interactive map of Main Drama Theater
- Address: Magtymguly şaýoly, 78; Ashgabat; Turkmenistan
- Coordinates: 37.94326°N 58.3878°E
- Owner: Ministry of Culture of Turkmenistan

Construction
- Opened: 2005
- Architect: Bouygues

The Main Drama Theatre of Turkmenistan (Turkmen: Türkmenistanyň Baş Drama Teatry) is a major theatre in Ashgabat, Turkmenistan, designed and built by the French construction company Bouygues. Its repertoire is mainly based on the plays of classical and modern Turkmen playwrights, presented in the Turkmen language. The theatre troupe consists of folk and popular artists of Turkmenistan. It is considered the main theater in the country.

The theatre opened in October 2005, and was initially named in honor of then-President of Turkmenistan Saparmurat Niyazov., officially called Main Drama Theatre after Saparmurat Turkmenbashi the Great.

== Links ==
- Theatres and Cinema Centers
