= Turkmen Museum of Fine Arts =

Art museum in Turkeministan

Coordinates: 37°56′07″N 58°22′29″E

The Museum of Fine Arts is an art museum in Ashgabat, Turkmenistan. It was founded in 1927 by Russian sculptor A.A Karelin and in 1939 it attained the status of the Museum of Fine Arts.

The museum has more than 6,000 works in its collection, including paintings, sculptures, jewellery, costumes and graphic works by Turkmen, Russian and foreign artists.

The museum features artwork by such artists as Ivan Cherinko, Durdy Bayramov, Byashim Nurali, Husein Huseinov, Amangeldy Hydyr, I. Ilisl, Izzat Klychev, S. Babicov and a notable collection of European paintings including Italian, Dutch, Flemish, German and English.
