= Galkynysh Square, Ashgabat =

Square in Ashgabat, Turkmenistan

Galkynysh Square
- Native name: Galkynysh meýdany (Turkmen)
- Type: Square
- Location: Ashgabat, Turkmenistan

Construction
- Completion: 6 January 2011

Other
- Known for: Proximity to the Presidential Palace

Galkynysh Square (Square of Revival) is a square in Ashgabat, Turkmenistan. It sits at the intersection of Turkmenbashi and Galkynysh Avenues.

Landmarks on or near the square include:

- Palace of Congresses
- Oguzkhan Presidential Palace
- Nusai Hotel
- Monument to the Constitution

== See also ==
- Independence Square, Ashgabat
- List of city squares
