= Monument to the Constitution =

Monument in Ashgabat, Turkmenistan

Coordinates: 37°53′55″N 58°19′20″E

Monument to the Turkmenistan Constitution
- Konstitusiýa binasy
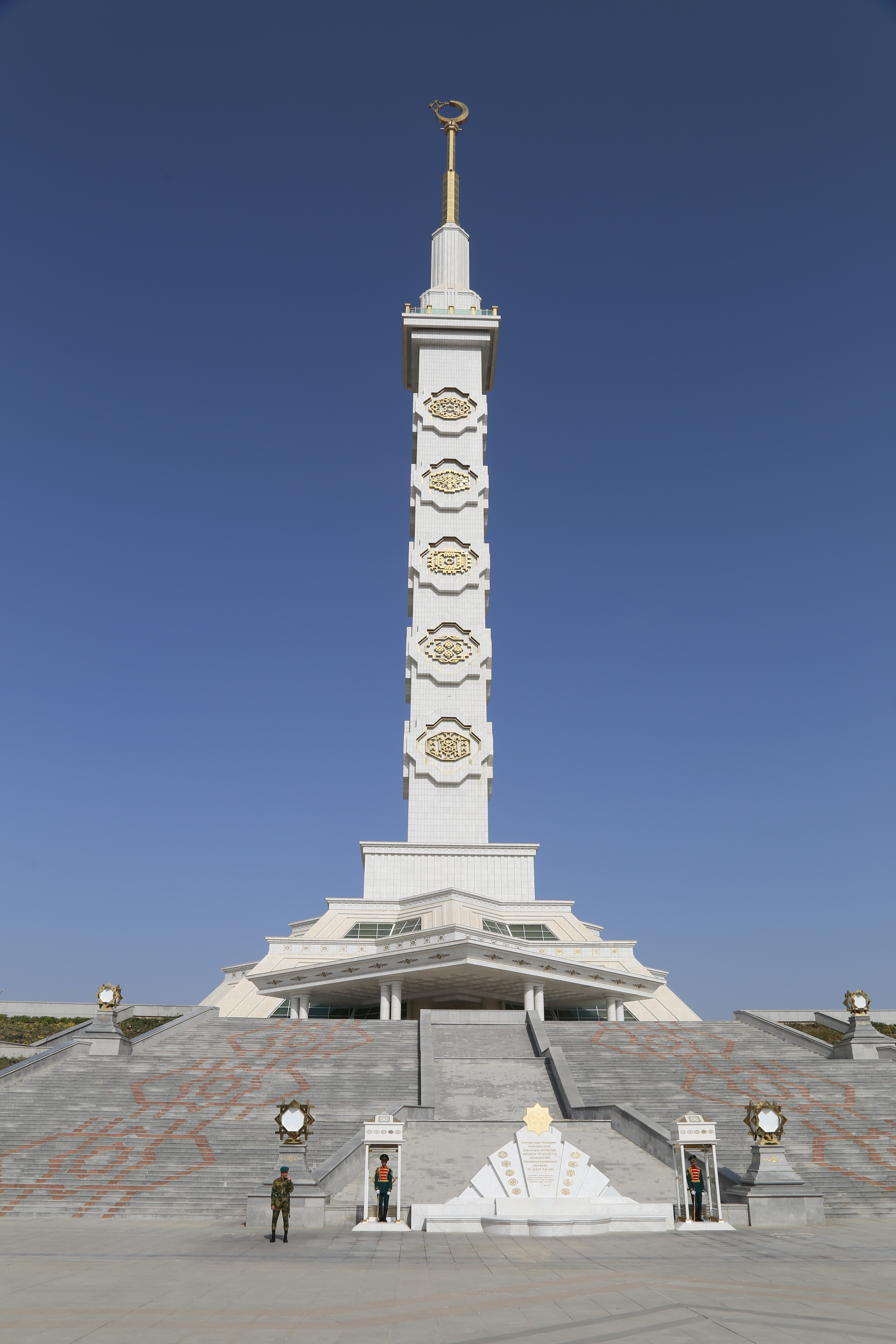

General information
- Type: Monument
- Location: Archabil avenue

Height
- Height: 185 m (607 ft)

Design and construction
- Architect: Polimeks

Monument to the Turkmenistan Constitution (Turkmen: Türkmenistanyň Konstitusiýa binasy) is a monument located in Ashgabat, Turkmenistan. Its height of 185 meters makes it the second-tallest building in Turkmenistan. The monument is decorated with marble. Built to honor the 20th anniversary of the Constitution of Turkmenistan, it was constructed between 2008 and 2011 on the Archabil avenue, by the Turkish construction company Polimeks.

== History ==
Turkmenistan was formerly the Turkmenistan Soviet Socialist Republic as a part of the Soviet Union. Following the dissolution of the Soviet Union and the independence of Turkmenistan, they granted themselves a new constitution in 1992. In 2008, to build towards the 20th anniversary of the constitution, the government of Turkmenistan announced the erection of the monument. Ahead of the official unveiling, an opening ceremony was planned. Students and state workers were drafted in for the ceremony and obliged to take part in 40 days of dress rehearsals often without water or being required to stand in heavy rain. It was formally opened by the President of Turkmenistan, President Gurbanguly Berdymukhamedov.

== Gallery ==
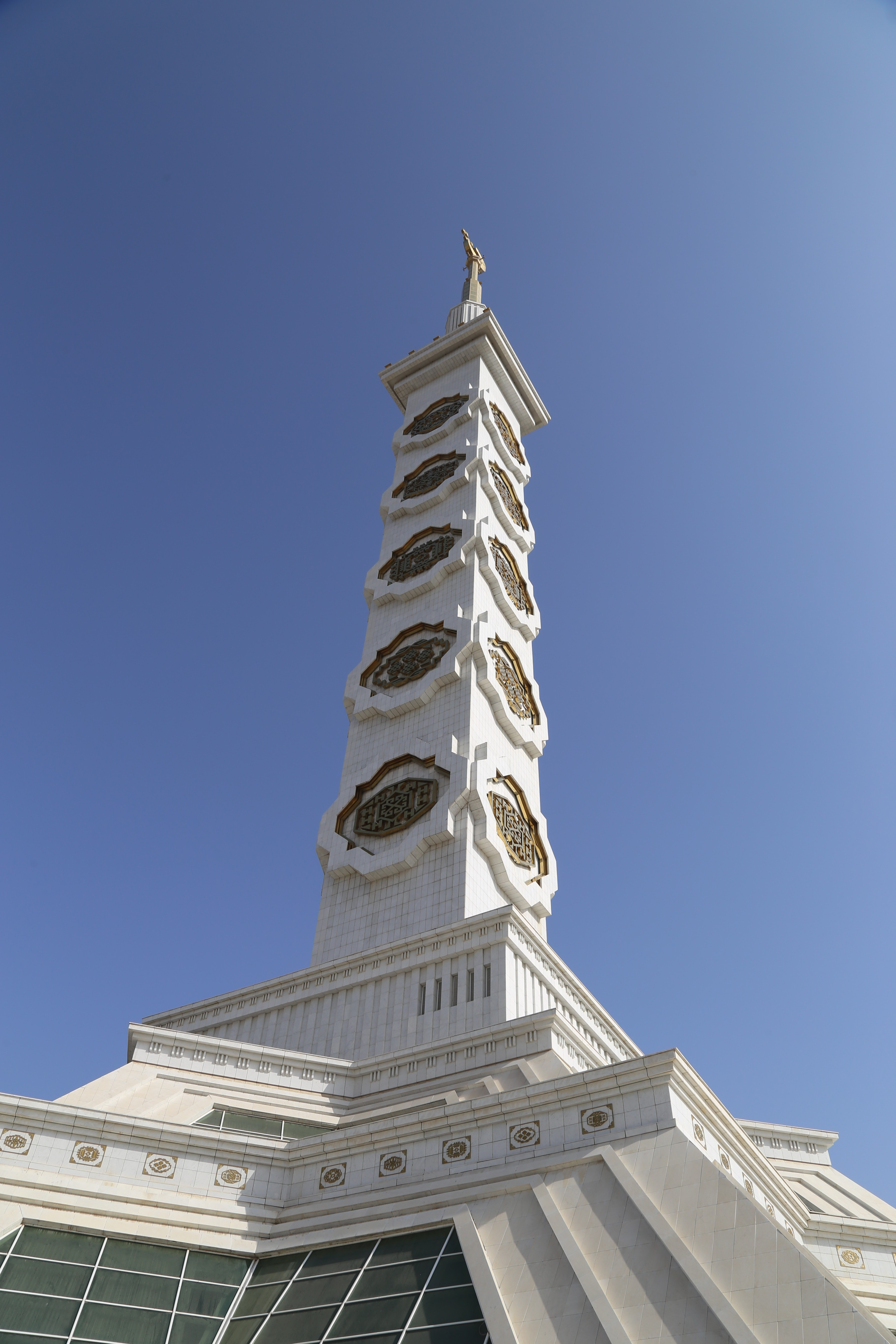
Closeup
