= Alp Arslan National Drama Theatre =

Alp Arslan National Drama Theatre of Turkmenistan
- Interactive map of Alp Arslan National Drama Theatre of Turkmenistan
- Address: Archabil avenue, 46; Ashgabat; Turkmenistan
- Coordinates: 37.8852°N 58.3522°E
- Capacity: 200 + 800 seats
- Type: Youth theatre

Construction
- Rebuilt: 2006
- Architect: GAP Insaat

The Alp Arslan National Drama Theatre of Turkmenistan (Turkmen: Türkmenistanyň Alp Arslan adyndaky milli drama teatry), known as the Alp Arslan National Youth Theatre of Turkmenistan (Turkmen: Alp Arslan adyndaky milli Ýaşlar teatry) until 2015, is located on Archabil avenue of Ashgabat.

== History ==
In the past, the theatre was sited in a former cinema building.

In 2006, the theatre relocated to a new four-storey, 9,000 square metres (97,000 sq ft), building in the south of Ashgabat. It was built by Turkish company GAP Insaat and inaugurated on 21 October 2006. The cost of the building was $17 million.

== Description ==
The theatre walls are lined with Italian marble, the facade is decorated with tall columns and stained glass windows. The building has four elevators. The theatre scene has two spinning halls with 800 and 200 seats. The area of the main stage is more than 400 square metres. On the square in front of the theatre is a monument to Turkmen ruler Alp Arslan.

== Links ==
- About the theatre
