= Saparmurat Turkmenbashi Avenue =

Street in Ashgabat, Turkmenistan

Saparmurat Turkmenbashi the Great Avenue
- Native name: Beýik Saparmyrat Türkmenbaşy şaýoly (Turkmen)
- Location: Ashgabat, Turkmenistan
- Postal code: 744000

Saparmurat Turkmenbashi the Great Avenue (Turkmen: Beýik Saparmyrat Türkmenbaşy şaýoly) is the main avenue and one of the largest arteries of Ashgabat.

== Characteristics ==
Saparmurat Turkmenbashi the Great Avenue starts from the Ashgabat railway station square and going from north to south through the city. On the south side it ends at the Kopet Dag, which goes into Howdan highway.

On the avenue there are various institutions of Turkmenistan, including the Turkmen State University, the Military Institute, the Ashgabat Olympic Stadium. There is the OSCE center in Turkmenistan. At the southern end of the avenue at the intersection with an Archabil Avenue located Park of Independence, which is the Monument of Independence.

Until 2012, from the Ashgabat Railway Station on avenue was organized by trolleybus.

== History ==
After the founding of Ashgabat in 1881 street was named in honor of General Mikhail Annenkov, under whose leadership was built Trans-Caspian railway passing through the city. After the establishment of USSR it was called Street of the October Revolution, and then was renamed the Lenin Avenue. After gaining independence of Turkmenistan, avenue was renamed in honor of the leader of Turkmenistan, Saparmurat Turkmenbashi the Great, and in 2001 became one of the few roads, which not got dimensional designation.

Frequent earthquakes determined the image of the city in the first decades of existence: straight streets, one-story adobe buildings, orchards. However, after the 1948 Ashgabat earthquake that destroyed up to 98% of the city, it was decided to build it again. In general, retaining the old plan, the builders have expanded and straightened streets and erected at their home in the South-Stalinist architectural style, which is found in many resort towns of the Soviet Union.

In independent Turkmenistan to demonstrate the onset of the Golden Age, the city began to actively rebuild, including significant changes undergone Turkmenbashi Avenue. Some buildings of the Stalin era were replaced with new marble palaces, was created by the big Independence Park, next to which there were new high-rise buildings. Residential complexes on the avenue, built in the late Soviet period, have undergone external changes, during which stoned facades composite marble tiles and ornate exterior decoration added. Full reconstruction subjected to Olympic Stadium.
