= Ashgabat (park) =

Park in Ashgabat, Turkmenistan

Coordinates: 37°56′20″N 58°23′25″E

Ashgabat Park
- Interactive map of Ashgabat Park
- Type: Urban park
- Location: Ashgabat, Turkmenistan
- Created: 1890
- Status: Open all year

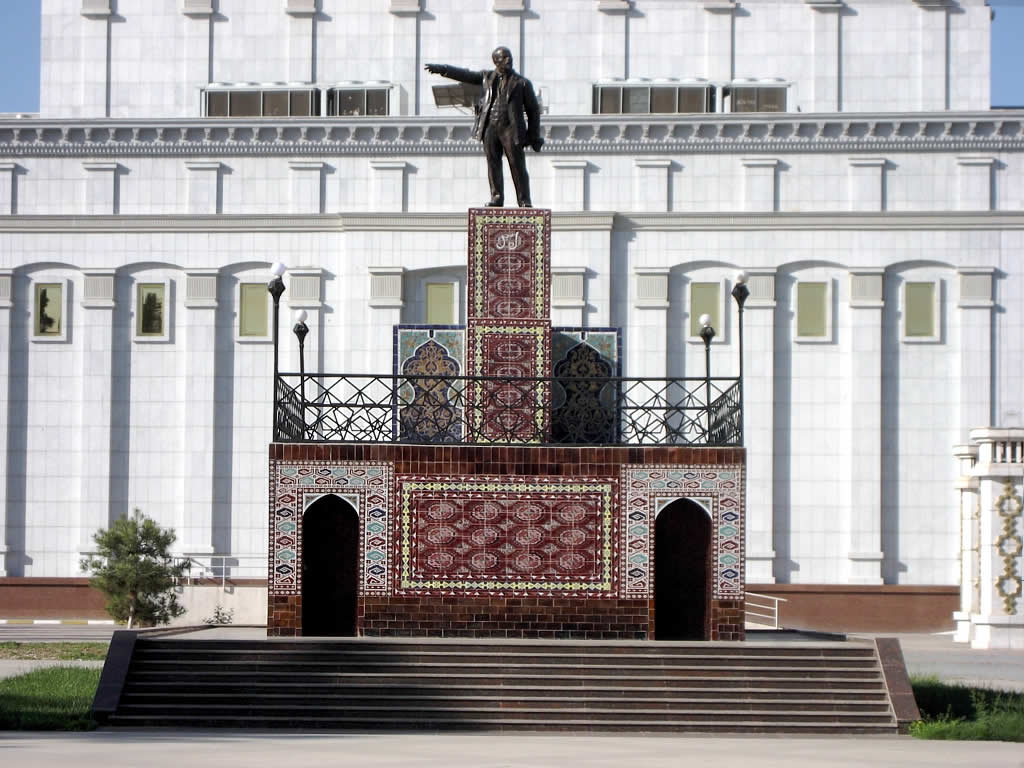
Lenin statue in Ashgabat, Turkmenistan.

Ashgabat Park (Turkmen: Aşgabat seýilgähi) is among the oldest public parks at the center of Ashgabat in Turkmenistan. Located between the Kuliyev, Azadi streets and Mahgymguly, Saparmurat Turkmenbashi avenues. Today covers an area of 7 hectares.

== History ==
Laid in 1887 and initially called "The City Summer Garden, it was founded in 1890 as Officer Park, in the park was located building of Nobility Assembly of Russian Empire. In the USSR was called Lenin Park, and was known by the locals as First Park. Post the declaration of Turkmen independence, the park was given the name of "Ashgabat". In 2014 was opened after reconstruction.

== Design ==
In the park there are trees aged 100 years or more. Along the main avenue, on both sides there are various attractions, gazebos and pavilions. The park installed major figures of dinosaurs. Visitors can eat at various restaurants, cafes and mobile food outlets. The park has an amphitheater built cultural center of the park, where concerts of classical, folk and pop music.
