= Husein Huseinov =

Turkmen artist (born 1951)

Husein Huseinov (born 22 September 1951 in Ashgabat) is a Turkmen painter and art director in films.

== Biography ==
In 1977 he graduated from the Art Faculty of the All-Union State Institute for Cinematography in Moscow. In 1982 he joined the USSR Union of Artists and from 1992 regularly appeared on the artistic scene in Baku, Azerbaijan.

In the late 1990s he attained a scholarship and moved to Innsbruck, Austria. He currently resides in his native city of Ashgabat. Huseinov has also worked on more than ten films and theatrical productions.

== Style ==
Huseinov is primarily a landscape painter depicting the desert and vast steppes of his native Turkmenistan alternating between abstract and figurative representations of this landscape and the human beings living in it. His landscape paintings are a mixture of childhood memories and ancient Silk Road images. The same motives (ancient artefacts, mosaics, textiles) are to be found in his still lifes. From time to time he also explores sculptural techniques like for instance objects of cardboard paper and collages.

== Achievements ==
Huseinov has participated in exhibitions held in Russia, France, United Kingdom, Germany, Turkey and Iran, where in 1997 his work featured in Tehran. Much of his artwork has been purchased by the Turkmen Museum of Fine Arts, the Moscow Directorate for Artistic Exhibitions, and by private collectors internationally.

He is a recipient of the Honorable Artist of Turkmenistan and was awarded the State Award of the USSR. He is a member of the Amsterdam-based Academy of Russian Arts.
