= Byashim Nurali =

Soviet painter (1900–1965)

- Born: Byashim Yusupovich Nurali ca. 1900; Turkmenistan
- Died: ca. 1965 n/a
- Occupation: primitive painter

Byashim Yusupovich Nurali (1900–1965) was a Turkmen primitive painter active during Soviet times. One of the first Turkmen painters, he was killed in an air crash. Nurali was also an art teacher. His works can be found in the Saparmurat Turkmenbashi Fine Arts Museum in Ashgabat.
