= 1994 Turkmen presidential term referendum =

A referendum on extending President Saparmurat Niyazov's term until 2002 was held in Turkmenistan on 15 January 1994. Official results showed that the proposal was approved by 99.99% of voters with a 100% turnout.

== Background ==
In 1985, Saparmurat Niyazov, then the first secretary of the Ashgabat Communist Bloc, was handpicked by Soviet leader Mikhail Gorbachev into elite politics as a replacement for Muhammad Gapusov, the First Secretary of the Communist Party of Turkmenistan. This replacement was part of the Central Asian purges in the wake of the Uzbek cotton corruption scandal. In January 1990 Niyazov was elected to the Supreme Soviet of the Turkmen Soviet Socialist Republic and was appointed as its chairman. Two months later, Niyazov was elected by the Supreme Soviet to the new office of president. Following in the footsteps of his predecessor(s), Niyazov prevented Gorbachev-era reforms from having any tangible effect on what was among the most conservative federal republics of USSR. Opposition groups were routinely disbanded and members exiled on charges of anti-Soviet activities.

In October 1990 his presidency was "unanimously" confirmed by the masses. A year later he led Turkmenistan to secede from the Soviet Union despite an initial reluctance, and decreed a new constitution that promulgated a presidential government. The political atmosphere of the newly independent state remained as conservative as before, with Niyazov finding "classic, democratic formulas [..] that worked out in some prosperous Western country" unsuitable for Turkmenistan. In 1992 Niyazov was re-elected unopposed as president, receiving over 98% of the vote. Following these victories, Niyazov went further in manifesting a totalitarian regime based on a cult of personality.

== Question ==
Voters were asked to decide whether to prolong the term of President Niyazov by six years, until 2002. The question was worded "Do you support extending the term of President Saparmurat Niyazov until 2002?"

== Results ==
According to official statistics, 100% of the registered voters (1,959,637) participated in the referendum.

Choice	Votes	%
For	1,959,408	99.99
Against	212	0.01
Total	1,959,620	100.00
Valid votes	1,959,620	100.00
Invalid/blank votes	17	0.00
Total votes	1,959,637	100.00
Registered voters/turnout	1,959,637	100.00
Source: Nohlen et al.

== Aftermath ==
The promised elections were not held in 2002 as Niyazov had himself declared President for life by the Assembly on 28 December 1999. He would rule until his death in 2006.
