= Language Instruction for Newcomers to Canada =

Canadian language education programme

The Language Instruction for Newcomers to Canada (LINC; French: Cours de langue pour les immigrants au Canada, CLIC) program is a free language education programme—funded and regulated by the Canadian government's Department of Immigration, Refugees and Citizenship—that offers full-time and part-time English- (excluding Quebec) and French-language lessons to adult permanent residents (or those with approval-in-principle) and Convention refugees.

The LINC is not available for Canadian citizens, refugee claimants, temporary residents (e.g., foreign students, foreign workers, or visitors). The program is designed to meet English language needs, ranging from day-to-day living to job searching. This includes improving reading, writing, listening, and speaking skills.

Language classes are facilitated by local immigrant-service agencies; for example, ISSofBC is a community organization that provides LINC in British Columbia. The program is primarily provided in English; the French-language program, CLIC, is provided by institutions such as:

- Educacentre College in Vancouver, BC
- La Cité des affaires (affiliated with Collège La Cité) in Ottawa
- Collège Mathieu in Gravelbourg, Saskatchewan
- Collège Boréal in Southern Ontario
- L'École des adultes Le Carrefour (affiliated with the Conseil des écoles publiques de l'Est de l'Ontario)

LINC classes are based the Canadian Language Benchmarks (CLB; Niveaux de compétence linguistique canadiens), the official national standards for the assessment/measurement of adult immigrants' ability in English (or French) as a second language.
