= Exhibition Hall of the Ministry of Culture =

Coordinates: 37°55′44″N 58°22′44″E

Sergi köşgi
- Interactive map of the Sergi köşgi area

General information
- Location: Garaşsyzlyk avenue, 104, Ashgabat, Turkmenistan
- Opened: 2008
- Owner: Turkmenistan Government

Design and construction
- Architecture firm: Bouygues

The Exhibition Hall of the Ministry of Culture (Turkmen: Sergi köşgi) is an important government building in Ashgabat, Turkmenistan. It is operated by the Turkmen Ministry of Culture and regularly hosts displays including exhibitions, conferences and theatrical and drama performances in the arts. The three floors building was erected in 2005, by French company Bouygues.
