= Archabil Hotel Ashgabat =

Arçabil Hotel Ashgabat
- Arçabil Hotel Ashgabat
- Interactive map of the Arçabil Hotel Ashgabat area

General information
- Type: Hotel
- Location: Ashgabat, Turkmenistan
- Coordinates: 37°53′22.44″N 58°20′43.22″E
- Construction started: 2003
- Completed: 2004
- Opening: 2004

Height
- Antenna spire: 95 m (312 ft)

Technical details
- Floor count: 16

Design and construction
- Developer: Bouygues Turkmen Group

Other information
- Number of rooms: 148

Website
- Official website

Arçabil Hotel (former President Hotel) is a five star hotel located in the Ashgabat, Turkmenistan, along the Archabil Freeway on 18 km far from Ashgabat Airport and 12 km far from Ashgabat Railway Station.

== History ==
The President Hotel was renamed into the Archabil Hotel in May 2014.
