= 1990 Turkmenistan presidential election =

1990 Turkmen presidential election
- 27 October 1990
- Registered: 1,805,782
- Turnout: 96.71%
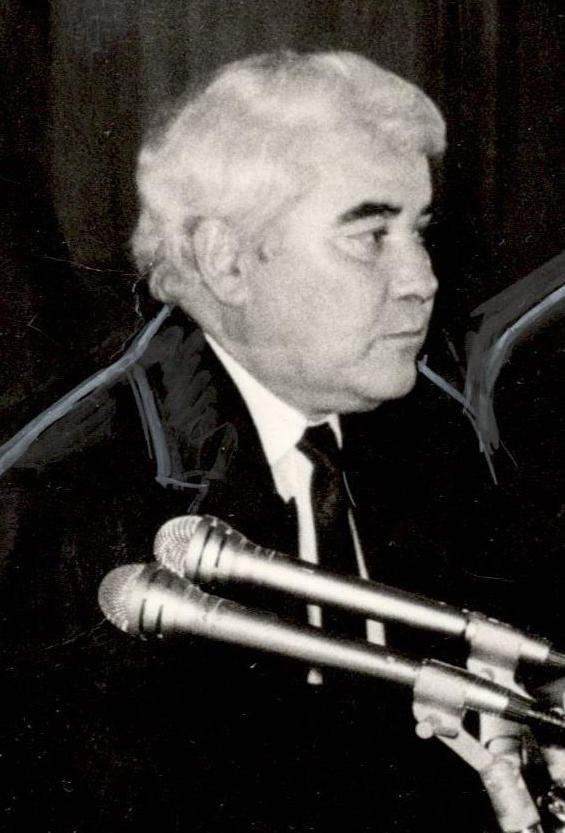
Nominee	Saparmurat Niyazov
Party	Communist Party
Popular vote	1,716,278
Percentage	98.29%
- Results by region
Elected President
Saparmurat Niyazov
Communist Party

Presidential elections were held for the first time in the Turkmen SSR on 27 October 1990. The only candidate was Saparmurat Niyazov, who won 98% of the vote. Voter turnout was 97%.

== Results ==
Candidate	Party	Votes	%
Saparmurat Niyazov	Communist Party of Turkmenistan	1,716,278	98.29
Against		29,790	1.71
Total		1,746,068	100.00
Valid votes		1,746,068	99.98
Invalid/blank votes		307	0.02
Total votes		1,746,375	100.00
Registered voters/turnout		1,805,782	96.71
Source: Nohlen et al.
