= Archabil Avenue =

Motorway in Ashgabat, Turkmenistan

Archabil avenue
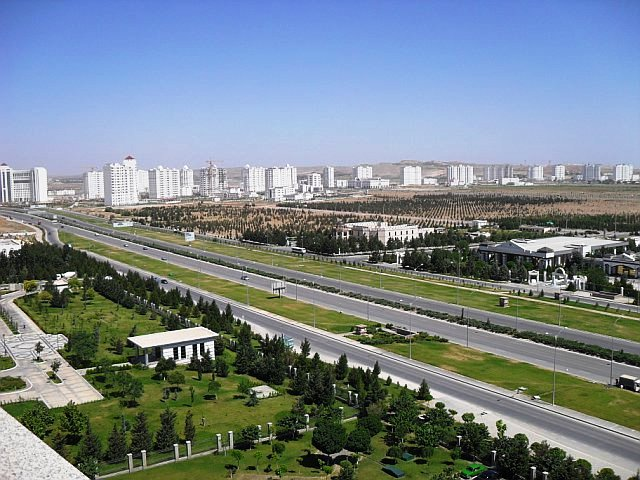
- Native name: Arçabil şaýoly (Turkmen)
- Length: 25 km (16 mi)
- Location: Ashgabat, Turkmenistan
- Postal code: 744000

Archabil Avenue (Turkmen: Arçabil şaýoly) is a motorway in Ashgabat, Turkmenistan. The eight-lane motorway has a length of 25.5 kilometres, and contains a dividing strip of more than 30 metres width.

== History and architecture ==
Archabil Avenue was built in 2004 by the Turkish company GAP Insaat. The avenue hosts the majority of Turkmenistan's ministry and departmental offices. Many newly built cultural and business centres are located on the avenue. In April 2013, additional construction activities on the highway commenced, undertaken by the Russian firm "Vozrozhdeniye."

== Notable buildings and structures ==
- Turkmen State Institute of Oil and Gas
- State Cultural Centre of Turkmenistan
- National Olympic Sport Palace
- Turkmen State Medical University named after Myrat Garryyev
- Ministry of Healthcare and Medical Industry of Turkmenistan
- Ashgabat Cancer Center
- UAE Embassy in Turkmenistan
- Embassy of China in Turkmenistan
- UN Regional Center for Preventive Diplomacy
- Ashgabat Flagpole
- National Dramatic Theatre named after Alp Arslan
- National Museum of Turkmenistan
- Ministry of Education of Turkmenistan
- Ministry of Foreign Affairs of Turkmenistan
- Monument to the Constitution of Turkmenistan
- Ministry of Justice of Turkmenistan
- Alem Cultural and Entertainment Center
- Ministry of Trade and Foreign Economic Relations
- Archabil Hotel
- State Concern "Türkmengaz"
- Ministry of Building and Architecture
- Turkmenistan National Space Agency
- Ministry of Agriculture and Ecological Protection
- State Statistical Committee
- State Agency of "Turkmenautotransport"
- Ministry of Industry and Communications
- State Customs Service
- Ministry of Finance and Economy
- Ministry of Railway Transport
- Ministry of Industry and Construction Production of Turkmenistan

== Links ==
- Project in ILK Construction
