= Institute of Telecommunications and Informatics of Turkmenistan =

Largest institution of higher education in Turkmenistan

Coordinates: 37.9308°N 58.3871°E

- Türkmenistanyň Telekommunikasiýalar we informatika instituty
- Established: 1992
- Rector: Nurnepes Kuliev
- Students: 1,350
- Location: Magtymguly avenue 68; Ashgabat; Turkmenistan, Ashgabat, Turkmenistan
- Campus: Urban
- Website: https://itit.edu.tm/

Institute of Telecommunications and Informatics of Turkmenistan (Turkmen: Türkmenistanyň Telekommunikasiýalar we informatika instituty) is the largest institution of higher education in Turkmenistan, located in the capital of Ashgabat. Founded in 1992, prepares professionals and higher vocational education for railway transport and other sectors of the economy. Its rector was Nurnepes Annaevich Kuliev, until the university was abolished.

== History ==
Turkmen State Institute of Transport and Communications (Turkmen: Türkmen döwlet ulag we aragatnaşyk instituty) - forge highly qualified personnel for the entire system of transport and communications of the country. At the 4 faculties of the Institute trained more than 1,350 students. In the departments of the institute has more than 140 faculty members.

In Ashgabat, September 1, 2009, was commissioned a new building of the institute. The complex consists of a multi-storey office tower, eight academic buildings, several gyms.

Turkmen State Institute of Transport and Communications liquidated on June 12, 2019. Institute of Telecommunications and Informatics of Turkmenistan became its legal successor. The new university transfers to the jurisdiction of the Ministry of Education of Turkmenistan and designates it as the legal successor of the abolished Turkmen State Institute of Transport and Communications. Nurnepes Annaevich Kuliev became a rector of the new educational institution. He has held a similar position in the abolished institute.

== Faculties ==
The Institute of Telecommunications and Informatics has 5 faculties, which, in total, train in 21 specialties.

== Links ==
Official site
