= Presidential Palace, Ashgabat =

Official residence of the president of Turkmenistan

Coordinates: 37.9343°N 58.3806°E

Presidential Palace
- Prezidentyň Köşgi (Turkmen)
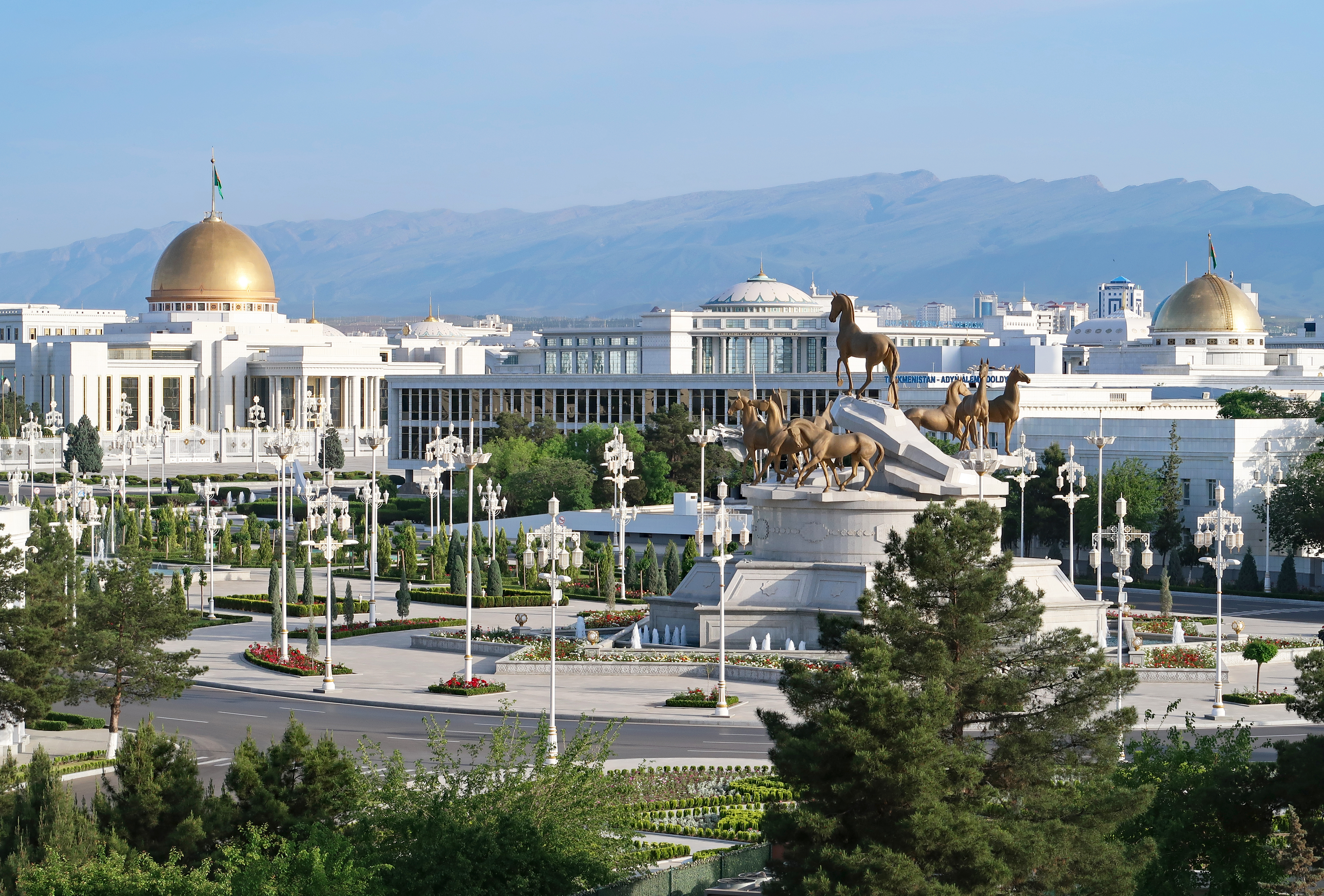
- The Presidential palace in left of the image

General information
- Location: Ashgabat, Turkmenistan
- Current tenants: Serdar Berdimuhamedow, President of Turkmenistan
- Construction started: 2008
- Completed: 2011
- Opening: 18 May 2011
- Owner: Presidential Administration, Government of Turkmenistan

Design and construction
- Main contractor: Bouygues

Presidential Palace (Turkmen: Prezidentyň Köşgi) is the official residence and principal workplace of the president of Turkmenistan, located on Independence Square in the capital city of Ashgabat in Turkmenistan. This building was built in May 2011, replacing the role of the smaller Oguzhan Presidential Palace, built in 1997 located nearby.

The palace is part of a larger complex also containing the Oguzhan Köşgi ('Oguzhan Presidential Palace') which is on the west side of the complex bordered by the Independence Square. The complex is bordered on the north by Köşk Köçesi ('Palace Street', former Karl Marx Street) and on the south by Galkynyş Köçesi ('Renaissance Street'). This street runs all the way to the southeastern tip of the complex bordering Galkynyş meýdany ('Renaissançe Square'). On the east it is bordered by the Beýik Saparmyrat Türkmenbaşy Street.

== Turkmenbashy Palace ==
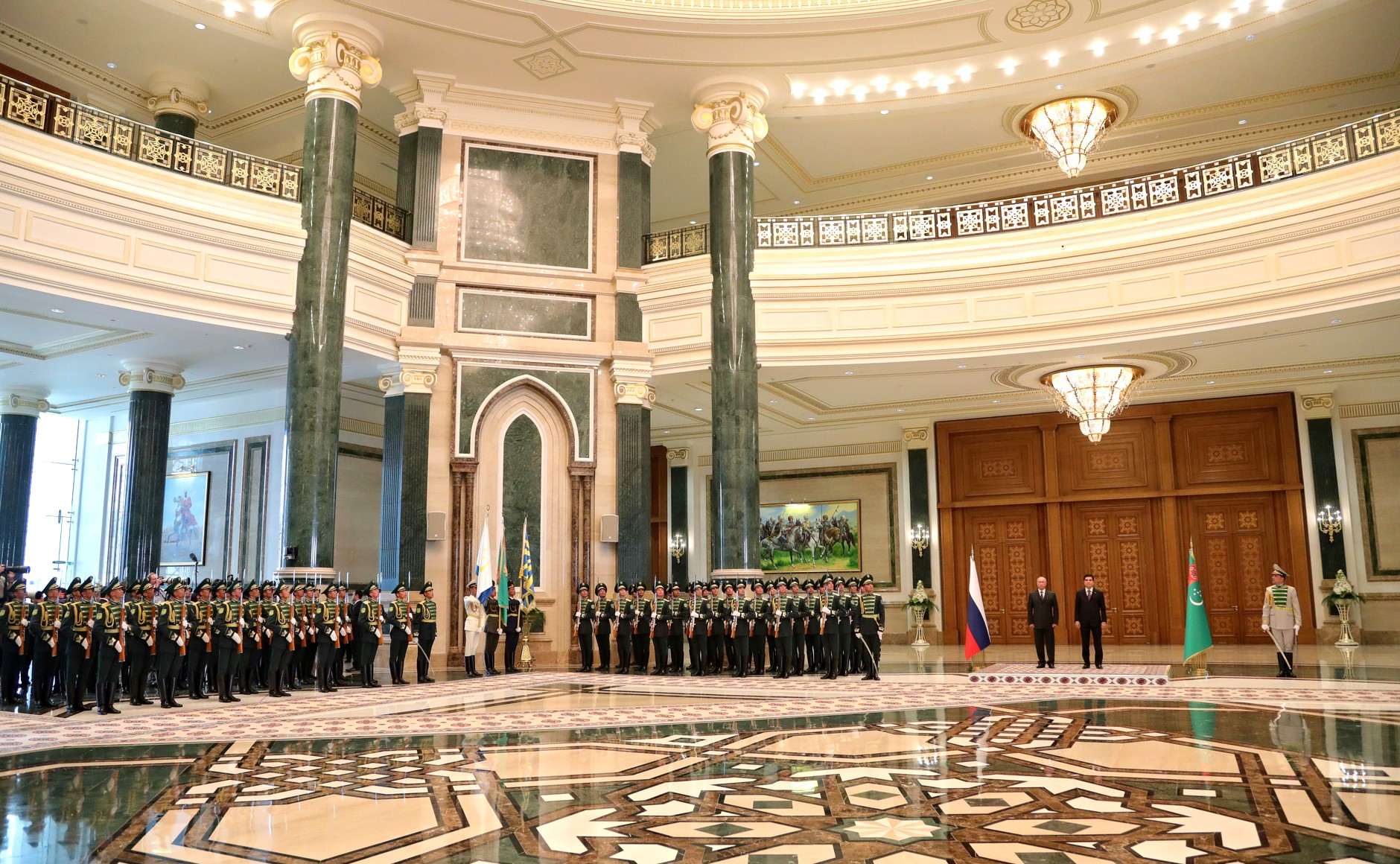
The main ceremonial hall of the palace used for the welcoming ceremonies of foreign leaders.

French construction firm Bouygues built the Oguzhan Presidential Palace in 1997 for then-President of Turkmenistan Saparmyrat Nyýazow. The original presidential palace was once notable for its flamboyant appearance, but it was subsequently overshadowed in architectural stature by large buildings in oil-rich Kazakhstan, and even impoverished Tajikistan.

== Evolution ==
Bouygues subsequently built a new palace. Construction began in 2008, and ended 18 May 2011. President Gurbanguly Berdimuhamedov attended the opening. The cost of a new palace $250 million.

=== Halls of the palace ===
Welcoming ceremonies of arriving dignitaries are held in the central hall of the palace. Called the Golden Hall, it is intended for high-level bilateral talks. Gorkut Ata Hall is another conference hall. Seljuk Han Hall is the site of the signing of bilateral agreements and intergovernmental agreements. The Bayram Han Hall is used for press conferences and press briefings. The Magtymguly Hall is used for a variety of meetings and cultural events. The palace complex also features a separate banquet hall used for entertaining visiting heads of state and of international organisations.

== Numismatics ==
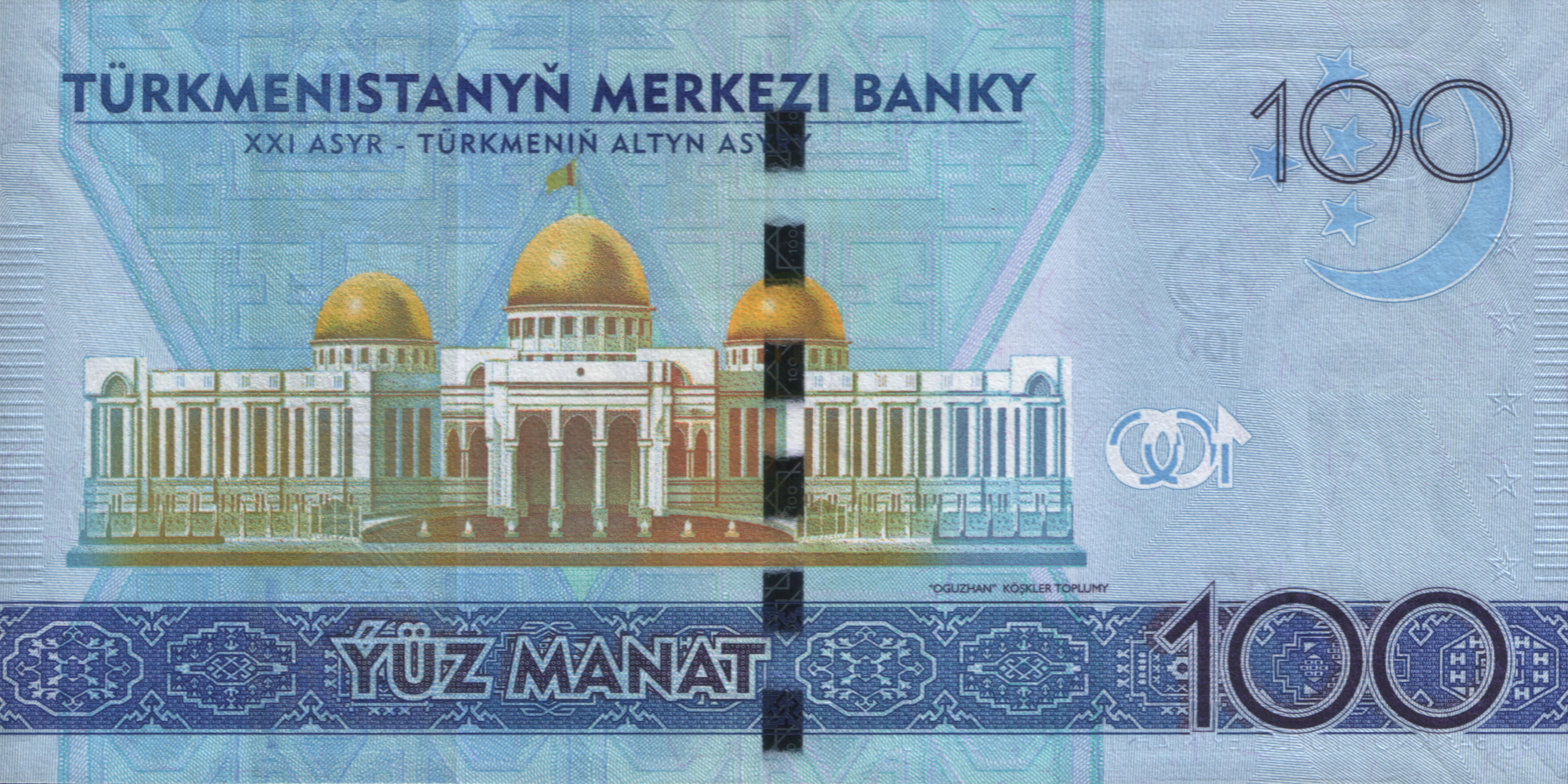
100 manat 2014
