= Independence Square, Ashgabat =

Square in Ashgabat, Turkmenistan

Independence Square
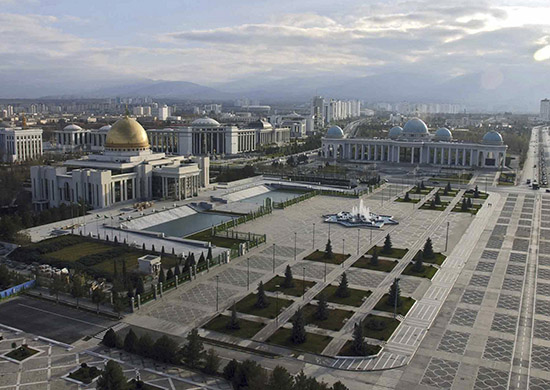
- Independence Square

- Location within Turkmenistan
- Native name: Garaşsyzlyk meýdany (Turkmen)
- Former names: Karl Marx Square; Neutrality Square; Turkmenbashy Square
- Type: Square
- Location: Ashgabat, Turkmenistan
- Coordinates: 37°56′06″N 58°22′46″E

Other
- Known for: The Central Square in Ashgabat

Independence Square (Turkmen: Garaşsyzlyk meýdany) is a square in Ashgabat, Turkmenistan. The identification number of the square is 2000.

== Development ==
By June 2009, the square was renovated, with new fountains, original lamps and benches, being built over the course of six months. In October 2014, President Gurbanguly Berdimuhamedov acquainted with the progress of landscaping on the square, taking a bike ride through the central part of the square.

In September 2021, in honor of the 30th anniversary of Turkmen independence, the largest flat screen TV Central Asia was placed on the government tribune. It coincided with the complete renovation of the government tribune.

On 16 September 2021, a new complex of the State Tribune was opened, built on Kopetdag Avenue in the south of Ashgabat. The former tribune in Independence Square will be reconstructed and renamed into the Business Reception Center of the Oguzkhan Presidential Palace.

== Events ==
The annual Turkmen Independence Day Parade, as well as welcome ceremony for foreign dignitaries visiting Ashgabat are held on the square. Festivities on New Year's Eve occurs on the square. In 2004, Turkmen leader Saparmurat Niyazov ordered that an original fountain be built on the square. In May 2007, a "Star Show" took place on the square dedicated to the Day of Workers of Culture and Arts and the poetry of Magtymguly Fragi, with three powerful telescopes being installed on the central square for people to look into the lens.

== Landmarks ==
- Oguzhan Presidential Palace
- Ruhyyet Palace
- Ministry of Defense headquarters
- Mejlis of Turkmenistan
- Center of the Social Organizations of Turkmenistan
- Turkmen State Library
- Ministry of Textile Industry
- National Olympic Committee of Turkmenistan
- Ashgabat Olympic Swimming Pool
- State Puppet Theatre
- Saparmurar Turkmenbashi Military Academy
- Pushkin Russian-Turkmen Secondary School
- Foreign Economic Relations' State Bank
- Embassy of the Kazakhstan
- Embassy of China

== Gallery ==
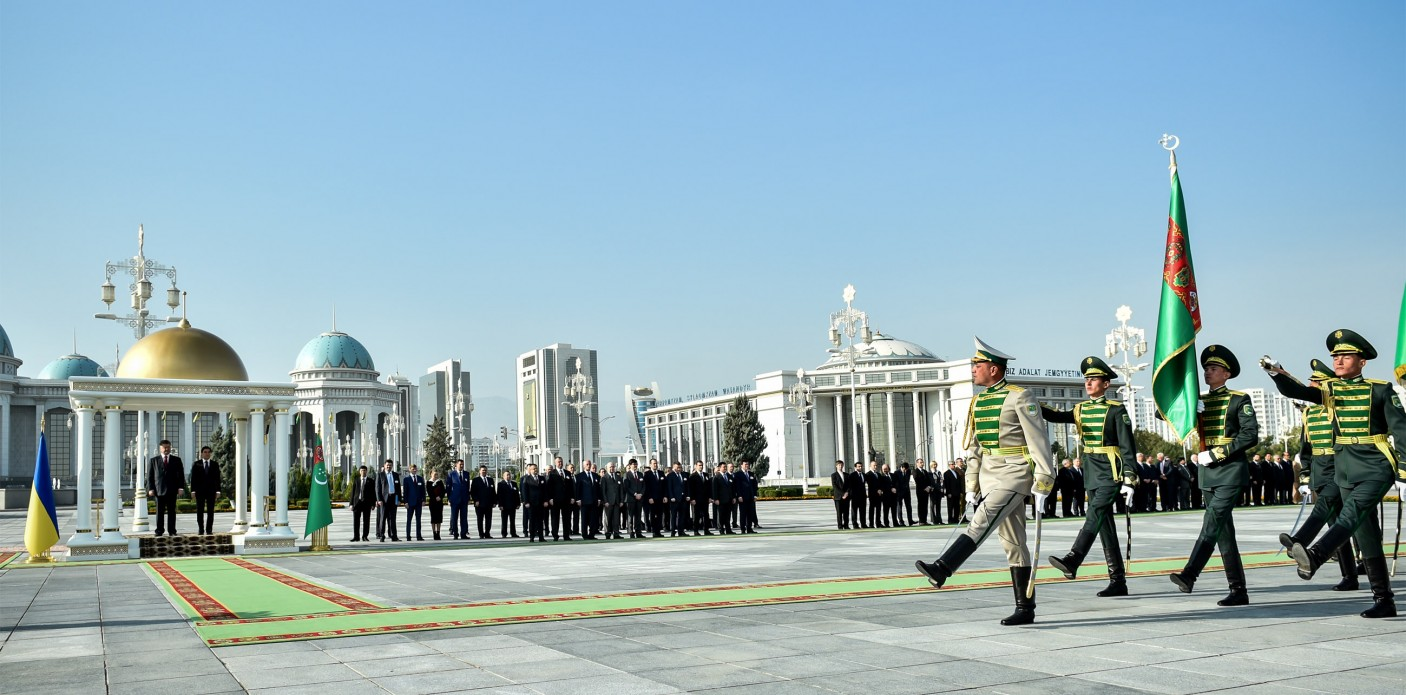
A state welcoming ceremony on the square.

Ruhyýet Palace

Ministry of Defense

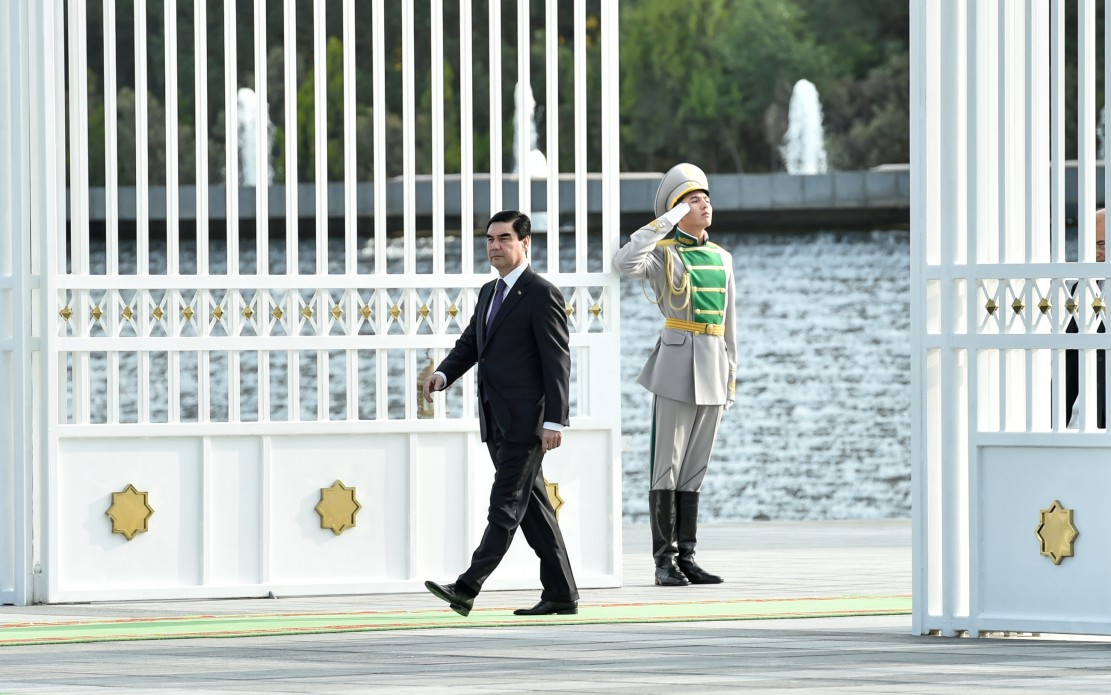
Gurbanguly Berdimuhamedow walking outside the Oguzkhan Presidential Palace and onto the square.

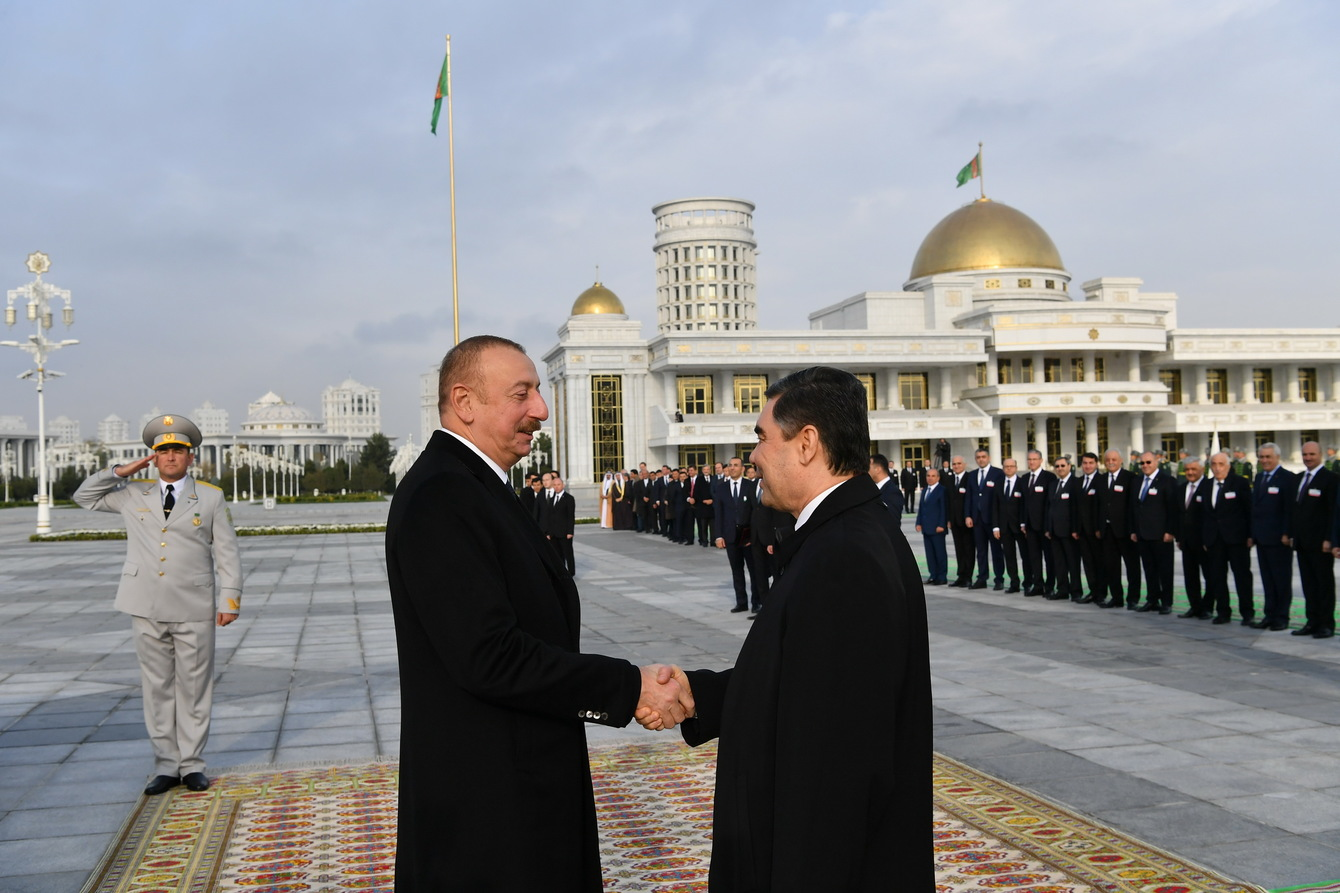
Berdimuhamedow and Ilham Aliyev in front of the Ceremony Field and Protocol Building.

== See also ==
- Ashgabat
- List of city squares
