= President of Turkmenistan =

Head of state and government

- Türkmenistanyň prezidenti
- Emblem of Turkmenistan

- Standard of the president of Turkmenistan

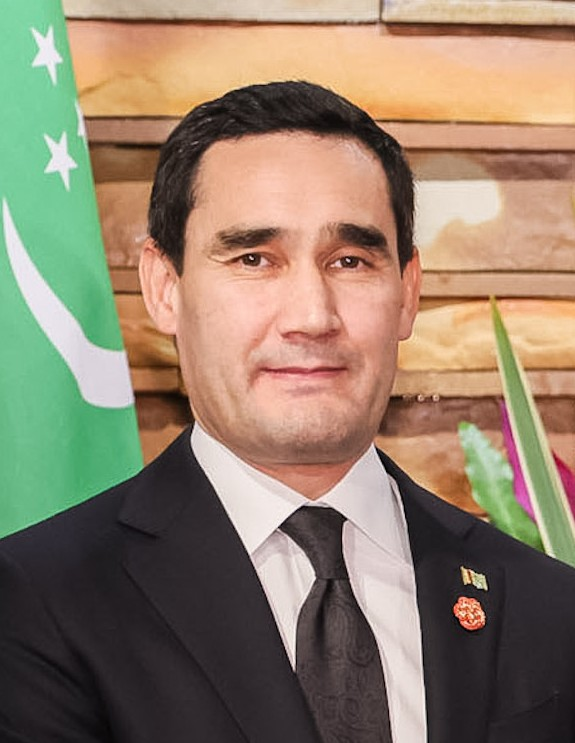
- Incumbent; Serdar Berdimuhamedow since 19 March 2022
- Style: Mr President (informal); Distinguished President of Turkmenistan (formal); His Excellency (diplomatic)
- Type: Head of state Head of government Supreme Commander-in-Chief
- Member of: Cabinet of Ministers (De facto Chairman of the Cabinet of Ministers); State Security Council; CIS Council of Heads of State
- Residence: Oguzhan Presidential Palace
- Seat: Ashgabat
- Appointer: Direct popular vote
- Term length: Seven years, renewable
- Constituting instrument: Constitution of Turkmenistan (1992)
- Formation: 2 November 1990; 36 years ago (Turkmen SSR); 27 October 1991; 35 years ago (Turkmenistan)
- First holder: Saparmyrat Nyýazow
- Succession: Chairman of the Assembly of Turkmenistan
- Deputy: Deputy Chairman of the Cabinet of Ministers of Turkmenistan
- Salary: 442,800 Turkmenistani manat/120,000 USD annually

The president of Turkmenistan (Turkmen: Türkmenistanyň prezidenti) is the head of state and head of government of Turkmenistan. The president is also the chairman of the Cabinet of Ministers of Turkmenistan, the supreme commander in chief of the Armed Forces of Turkmenistan and the chairman of the State Security Council.

Serdar Berdimuhamedow is the current president of Turkmenistan, the third in the history of the country since it gained independence with the dissolution of the Soviet Union in 1991. He succeeded his father, Gurbanguly Berdimuhamedow when the latter stepped down in 2022 after a reign of 15 years, the first president to do so. In the 2022 election, Berdimuhamedow received 72.97% of the country's popular vote against nine other candidates. International observers have criticized the honesty of this election. The country passed reforms in 2016 eliminating term limits for the presidency and removing the previous age requirement of below 70, as well as extending the term from five to seven years.

== Requirements for presidents, removal from office, and succession ==
Requirements for candidates for president of Turkmenistan include the following:

- Must have been born in Turkmenistan
- Must be fluent in Turkmen
- Must be at least 40 years old
- Must have resided in Turkmenistan for the past 15 consecutive years
- Must be employed

The powers of the president of Turkmenistan may be terminated in accordance with article 57 of the Turkmen constitution in the event of:

- Inability to perform their duties due to illness
- Violation of the constitution and public laws
- A vote of no confidence in the president

Should the president be removed from office as well as in the event of death or resignation, the chairman of the Assembly is legally appointed as acting president, with elections being held no later than 60 days after the fact. This has never taken place; in 2006, when Turkmenistan's only presidential vacancy occurred due to Nyýazow's death in office, the State Security Council of Turkmenistan transferred the right to act as President to the first deputy chairman of the Cabinet of Ministers on an ad-hoc basis. The requirement that an acting president does not have the right to run for president was also dropped.

== Residence ==
The Oguzkhan Presidential Palace is the principal residence/workplace of the president, located on Independence Square in Ashgabat. The various halls of the palace are used to receive foreign leaders and sign presidential decrees. Former President Saparmyrat Nyýazow owned a private residence in an official residence in Arshabil, a town 28 kilometres outside of Ashgabat.

== Transport and security ==
The president of Turkmenistan utilises a specially made Boeing 777-200LR, painted in the national colours, during international and regional visits. These planes are provided by Turkmenistan Airlines. The president employs a Mercedes-Benz S-Class vehicle to transport him throughout the capital city. On some occasions, the vehicle is escorted by a mounted troop from the armed forces. The president also utilises trains to transport them from one place to another.

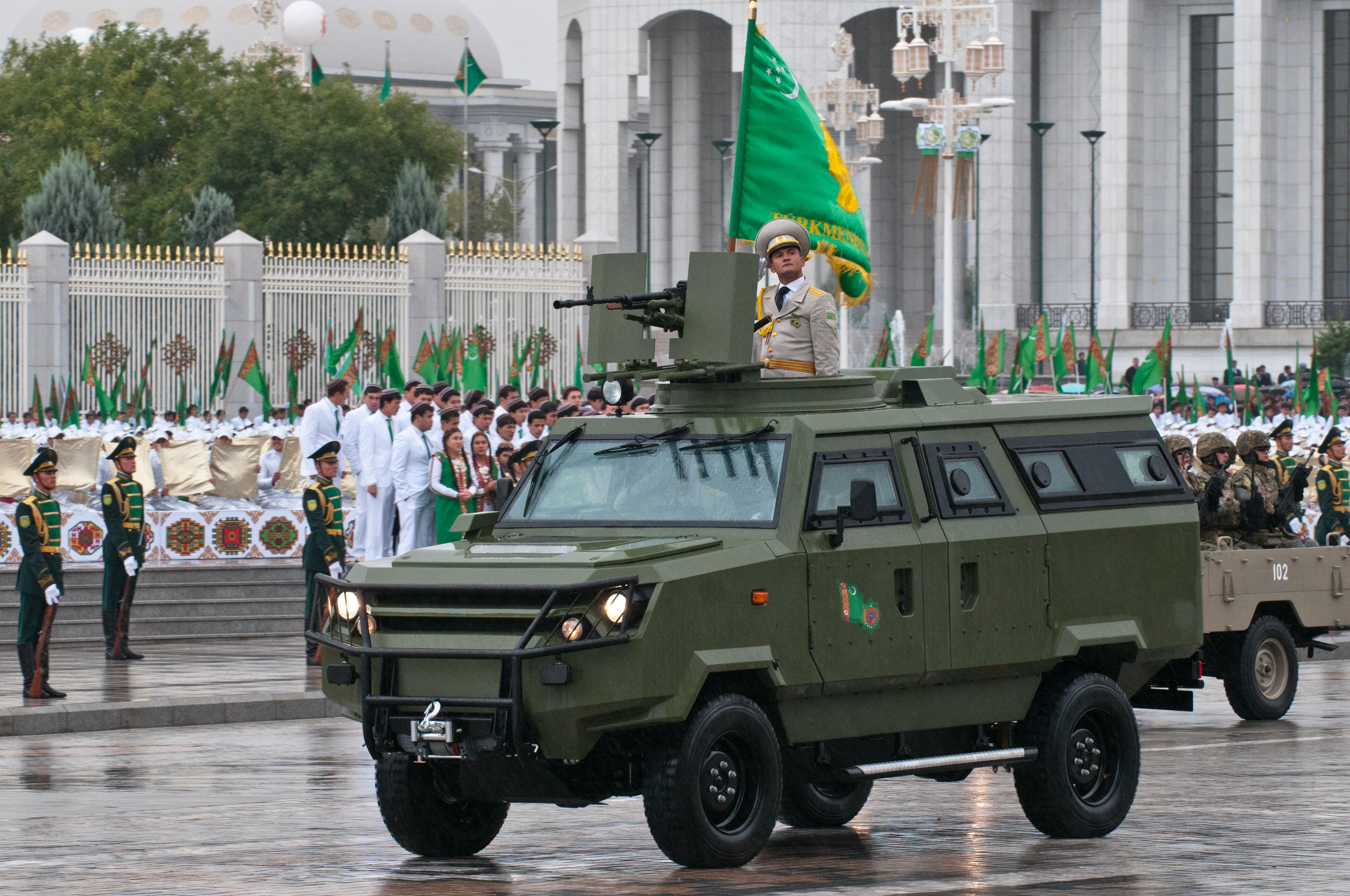
A vehicle of the security service in 2011.

The Presidential Security Service (Prezidentiniň howpsuzlyk gullugy) is responsible for ensuring the protection and security of the president. Established in November 1990, it is a direct reporting body of the President of Turkmenistan. In the early 1990s, the Presidential Security Service was removed from the National Security Committee and transformed into an independent body. On 23 September 1994, the Law of Turkmenistan "On the operative-search activity" came into force, according to which one of the main tasks of the service is to ensure the security of the President of Turkmenistan. During state visits to foreign countries, the service provides at least 10 agents to protect the president. The Presidential Security Service is organised in the following way:

- Secretariat
- Duty Division
- 1st Division (Personal guard of the president)
- 2nd Division
- 3rd Division
- 4th Division
- Special Operations Regiment
  - 1st Battalion
  - 2nd Battalion
  - 3rd Battalion

The Presidential Security Service is currently composed of 2,000 employees.

== List of presidents of Turkmenistan ==
Political parties

Communist Party of Turkmenistan (CPT)
Democratic Party of Turkmenistan (DPT)

Other affiliations

Independent

Status

Denotes acting president

Symbols

^{T} Term extension referendum

^{†} Died in office

No.	Portrait	Name (born–died)	Elected	Term of office			Political party
No.	Portrait	Name (born–died)	Elected	Took office	Left office	Time in office	Political party
1		Saparmurat Niyazov (1940–2006)	1990	2 November 1990	21 December 2006^{[†]}	16 years, 49 days	CPT (until 16 December 1991)
1		Saparmurat Niyazov (1940–2006)	1992; 1994^{[T]}	2 November 1990	21 December 2006^{[†]}	16 years, 49 days	DPT
2		Gurbanguly Berdimuhamedow (born 1957)	—	21 December 2006	14 February 2007	55 days	DPT (until 18 August 2013)
2		Gurbanguly Berdimuhamedow (born 1957)	2007; 2012	14 February 2007	19 March 2022	15 years, 33 days	DPT (until 18 August 2013)
2		Gurbanguly Berdimuhamedow (born 1957)	2017	14 February 2007	19 March 2022	15 years, 33 days	Independent
3		Serdar Berdimuhamedow (born 1981)	2022	19 March 2022	Incumbent	4 years, 247 days	DPT

== See also ==
- List of leaders of Turkmenistan
- Prime Minister of Turkmenistan
- Deputy Chairman of the Cabinet of Ministers of Turkmenistan
- State Security Council of Turkmenistan
- Republican Party of Turkmenistan
