= Detainment of Pygamberdy Allaberdyev =

Possible false detainment of Turkmen lawyer

Pygamberdy Allaberdyev is a lawyer from Turkmenistan, who was sentenced to a 6-year prison term on hooliganism charges but was released after 2 years. In May 2022, the Working Group on Arbitrary Detention at the United Nations concluded that Turkmenistan had violated international human rights law in detaining Allaberdyev, as his detention was likely related to his pro-democracy work. On December 10, 2022, he was released as part of a mass amnesty related to Turkmenistan's Day of Neutrality.

== Activism and career ==
Allaberdyev worked in Balkanabat for the oil and gas government office. During that time, he publicly opposed planned amendments to Turkmenistan's constitution and began planning a pro-democracy rally for 14 September 2020. Nine days before the rally was scheduled to take place, he was arrested.

== Arrest and trial ==
Allaberdyev was arrested after a man accosted him in a grocery store, with the man accusing him of starting the altercation. The International Commission of Jurists wrote, “This conflict is believed to be staged as a justification to detain the lawyer.” Turkmen authorities alleged that he was in contact with activists abroad, and questioned him on this issue. His house was searched. No defense lawyers were present during the interrogation or allowed to see Allaberdyev until the day of the trial. Ten lawyers refused to defend Allaberdyev in court, and he refused a government appointed lawyer. The trial, closed to Allaberdyev's relatives and the public, was held on 29 September 2020 and no witnesses were called.

== International response ==
Various organizations have used Allaberdyev's case to call attention to the situation of human rights in Turkmenistan.

On 14 September 2020, the International Commission of Jurists issued a statement asking for Allaberdyev's release, or for him to be charged "with a cognizable crime consistent with international human rights law." The statement emphasized that Turkmenistan is party to the International Covenant on Civil and Political Rights.

On 24 September 2020, The Council of Bars and Law Societies of Europe issued a letter expressing "serious concern" over Allaberdyev's detention.

On 22 October 2020, Human Rights Watch and nine other organizations demanded that, "Turkmenistan's authorities should immediately and unconditionally release ... [Allaberdyev, who is] imprisoned on bogus charges that appear to be in retaliation for his alleged ties with activists abroad."

In October 2021, Freedom Now and Vinson & Elkins LLP submitted a petition to the UN for Allaberdyev's release.

In July 2022, the Human Rights Institute of the International Bar Association and the non-governmental organization Lawyers for Lawyers issued a joint letter, "call[ing] upon the Turkmen authorities to immediately and unconditionally release Mr Allaberdyev, quash his conviction and accord him an enforceable right to reparation, in accordance with international law."

In 2022, the Working Group on Arbitrary Detention of the United Nations ruled that Allaberdyev's detention was in violation of international law.
