= Neutrality Monument =

Monument in Ashgabat, Turkmenistan

Coordinates: 37.8822°N 58.3333°E

Monument of Neutrality
- Bitaraplyk binasy (Turkmen)
- Interactive map of Monument of Neutrality
- Location: Bitarap Turkmenistan Avenue, Ashgabat, Turkmenistan
- Builder: Polimeks
- Type: Arch
- Height: 95 m (312 ft)
- Completion date: 1998

The Monument of Neutrality (Turkmen: Bitaraplyk binasy) is a monument and observation tower located in Ashgabat, Turkmenistan. The three-legged arch, which became known locally as "The Tripod", was 75 metres (246 ft) tall and was built in 1998 on the orders of President Saparmurat Niyazov to commemorate the country's official position of neutrality. It was constructed by Turkish construction firm Polimeks at a cost of $12 million.

Originally located in central Ashgabat, the monument was one of the tallest buildings in the city, being taller than the nearby Presidential Palace. It was topped by an illuminated 12-metre (39 ft) tall gold-plated statue of Niyazov which rotated to always face the sun. The monument features a panoramic viewing platform for visitors, accessible by inclined elevators built into the arch's legs.

In 2010, the monument was dismantled and moved to the suburbs in the city's southern end, where it was reassembled and still stands.

== Removal ==
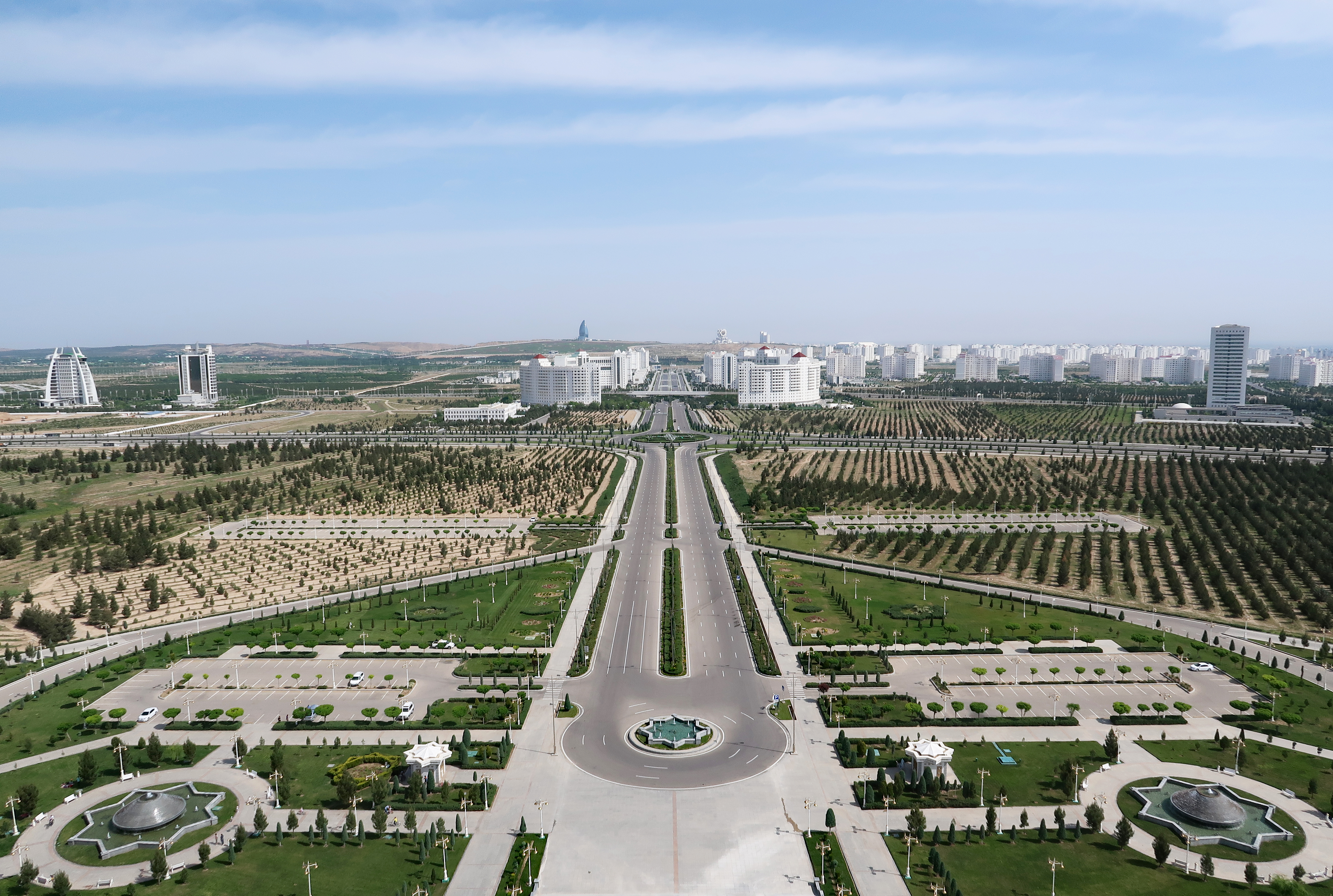
View of Ashgabat from Arch of Neutrality

On 18 January 2010, Niyazov's successor, President Gurbanguly Berdimuhamedow, signed a decree to dismantle and move the monument out of central Ashgabat. There were reports that it would be dismantled as early as 2008, but Berdimuhamedow did not approve the move until 2010. The dismantling was officially said to be a move to improve urban design in Ashgabat, but is seen as part of Berdimuhamedow's campaign to remove the excesses of the personality cult that Niyazov had created during his two decades of totalitarian rule. Niyazov also named cities and infrastructure after himself, and ordered the construction of an "ice palace" and a 40-metre (130 ft) tall pyramid, but the monument and its gold-plated statue have been described as the most notorious symbol of his legacy.

In 2010, Berdimuhamedow appointed Polimeks to dismantle the monument and move it to the suburbs in Ashgabat's southern end. The removal of Niyazov's statue was completed on 26 August 2010, although it was then placed back after the monument was moved. The statue no longer rotates, but the viewing platform is still usually open for visitors.

== Renovation ==
Starting in February 2025, the Neutrality Monument in Ashgabat will undergo renovation as part of preparations for the 30th anniversary of Turkmenistan’s neutrality and the designation of 2025 as the International Year of Peace and Trust. The project includes improvements to the surrounding area, landscaping with suitable greenery, modernization of transport infrastructure with innovative technologies, and an upgraded lighting system. The design will also incorporate elements reflecting the colors of the UN flag.

== Gallery ==
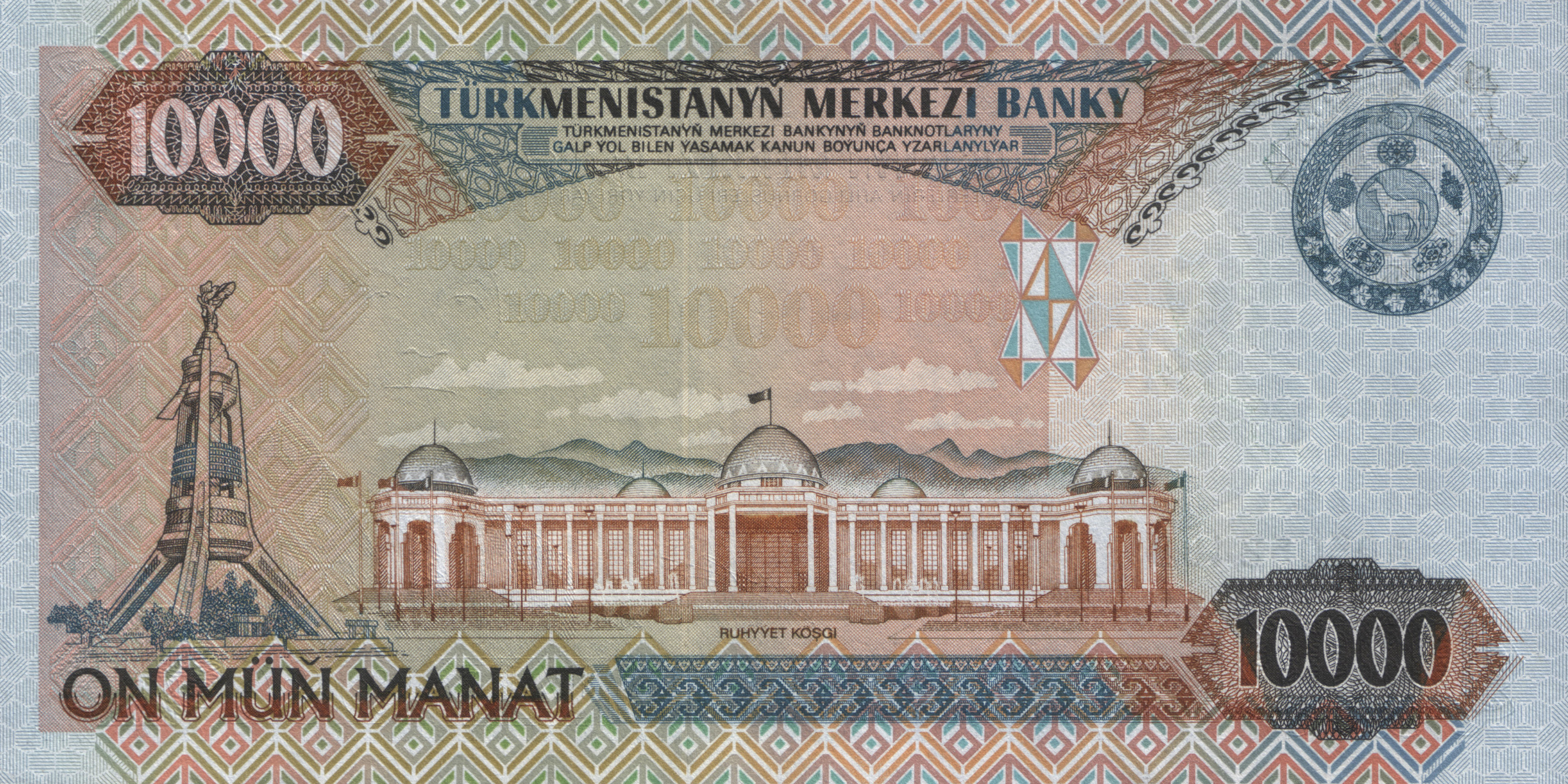
10000 manat

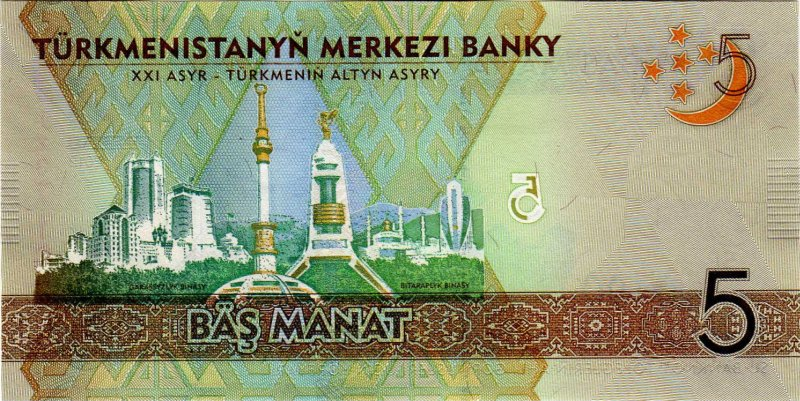
5 manat

Summit of the Neutrality monument, featuring a golden statue of Saparmyrat Nyýazow with the flag of Turkmenistan in the foreground

Golden statue of Saparmyrat Nyýazow

== See also ==
- De-Stalinization
