= Bitarap Turkmenistan Avenue =

Main road in Ashgabat, Turkmenistan

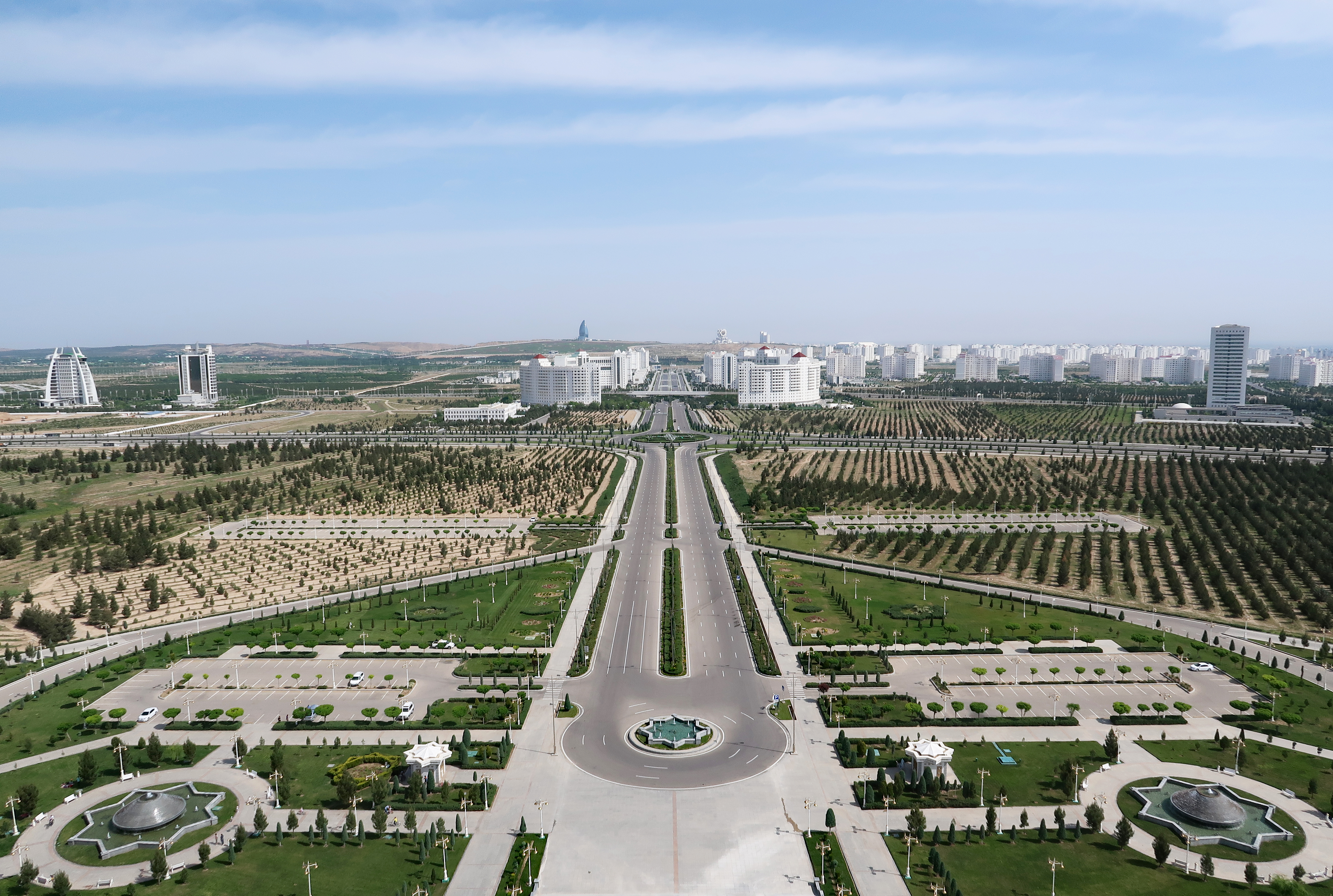
- View of Ashgabat from Arch of Neutrality to Bitarap Turkmenistan Avenue
- Interactive map of Bitarap Turkmenistan Avenue
- Native name: Bitarap Türkmenistan şaýoly (Turkmen)
- Location: Ashgabat, Turkmenistan
- Postal code: 744000

Bitarap Turkmenistan Avenue (Turkmen: Bitarap Türkmenistan şaýoly, lit. 'Neutral Turkmenistan Avenue') is the main avenue and one of the largest roads of Ashgabat. Bitarap Turkmenistan is historically called Podvoiskogo Street. In 2011, it was reconstructed by the Turkish company Polimeks. Prospect originates from the Neutrality Monument. White marble houses, modern supermarkets, office buildings, and infrastructure were built along the avenue. Prospect intersects Chandybil highway, Archabil highway and 10 Yyl Abadançylyk Avenue.

== Characteristics ==
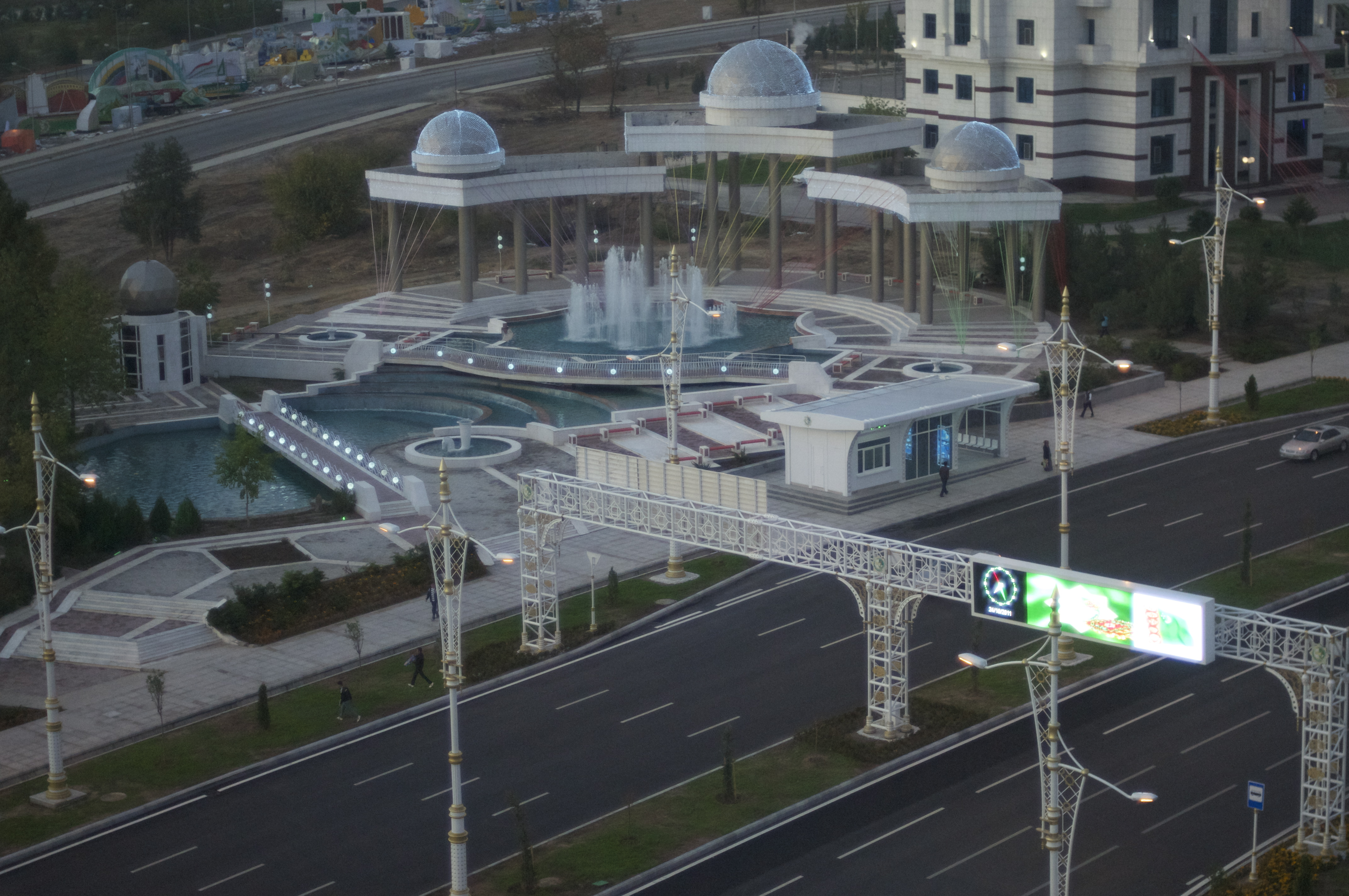

The road is 30 meters in width and consists of 8 lanes, with each direction of traffic comprising four lanes. The avenue has a side walk, bouquets dividing strip, and ancillary roads. The roadway curbs and sidewalks are paved with granite. Bus stops with air-conditioned rooms, a kiosk and a telephone booths furnished in Turkmen style are present throughout the tracks. Trees and shrubs have been planted along the avenue. The street is well equipped with a LED traffic light system along with several overhead and underground passages.

== Notable buildings and structures ==
- Neutrality Monument
- State Association "Turkmenatlary"
- Oguzkent Hotel
- Ministry of Culture of Turkmenistan
- Dayhanbank
- Central Bank of Turkmenistan
- Turkmen State News Service
