= Grand Turkmen Hotel =

Hotel in Ashgabat, Turkmenistan

Coordinates: 37°56′25″N 58°22′39″E

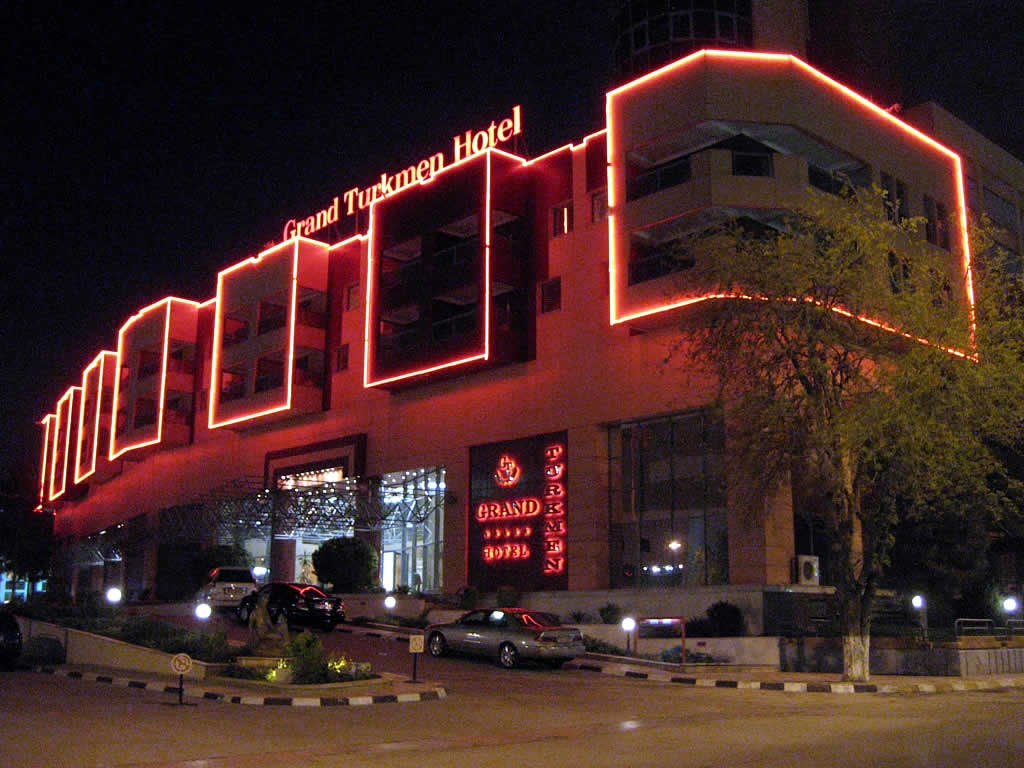

The Grand Turkmen Hotel is a five-star hotel in Ashgabat, Turkmenistan. Built in 1995 as the Sheraton Grand Turkmen, it has 120 rooms on 6 floors, and is located close to the administrative centre of the city, 15 minutes from the airport. Nearby are the Central Bank of Turkmenistan, Parliament of Country (Mejlis), Cabinet of Ministers, ministries, establishments, museums and theatres, and shops and markets within a 1 km radius. The hotel has two restaurants, a bar, casino, health club, swimming pool and tennis court.

The hotel is an important location for international conferences and many notable politicians, particularly Russian, have stayed at the hotel.

In 2015 the hotel underwent a major remodeling, including being lined with white marble.
