= Independence Monument (Turkmenistan) =

Monument in Ashgabat, Turkmenistan

Coordinates: 37°52′52.38″N 58°22′53.20″E

- Garaşsyzlyk binasy
- Interactive map of Independence Monument
- Location: Ashgabat, Turkmenistan
- Designer: Polimeks
- Height: 118 metres (387 ft)
- Beginning date: 2000
- Opening date: 2001
- Dedicated to: Independence from USSR

Independence Monument

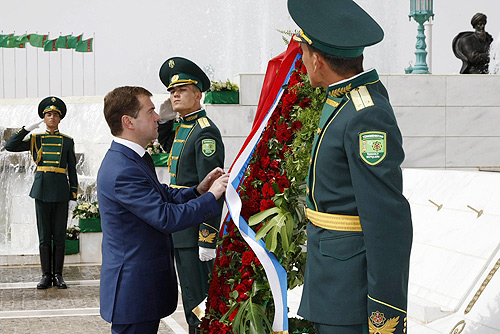
Dmitry Medvedev laying a wreath at the monument in 2008.

The "Independence Monument" is a monument located in Ashgabat, Turkmenistan. The design of this building was inspired by traditional Turkmen tents and the traditional headgear worn by Turkmen girls. Elements of the building commemorate the independence date of Turkmenistan, 27 September. These elements include a 91-metre (299 ft) reinforced concrete tower with a 27-metre (89 ft) high golden gilt steel construction on top of the tower, along with an observation terrace with a diameter of 10 metres (33 ft). Within the building, there are exhibition halls where important works of art representing Turkmenistan history are displayed. The Monument of Independence sits on a total area of 84,500 m^{2} (910,000 sq ft), surrounded by green landscaping that encompasses a cascaded pool and 27 heroic statues of Turkmen leaders, centered on a golden statue of Saparmurat Niyazov.

== Information ==
The monument was erected by the Turkish company Polimeks in 2001, to the tenth anniversary of the Independence of Turkmenistan.

By tradition, foreign guests plant a young tree on the Alley of Honorary Guests near the Independence Monument.

== Currency ==
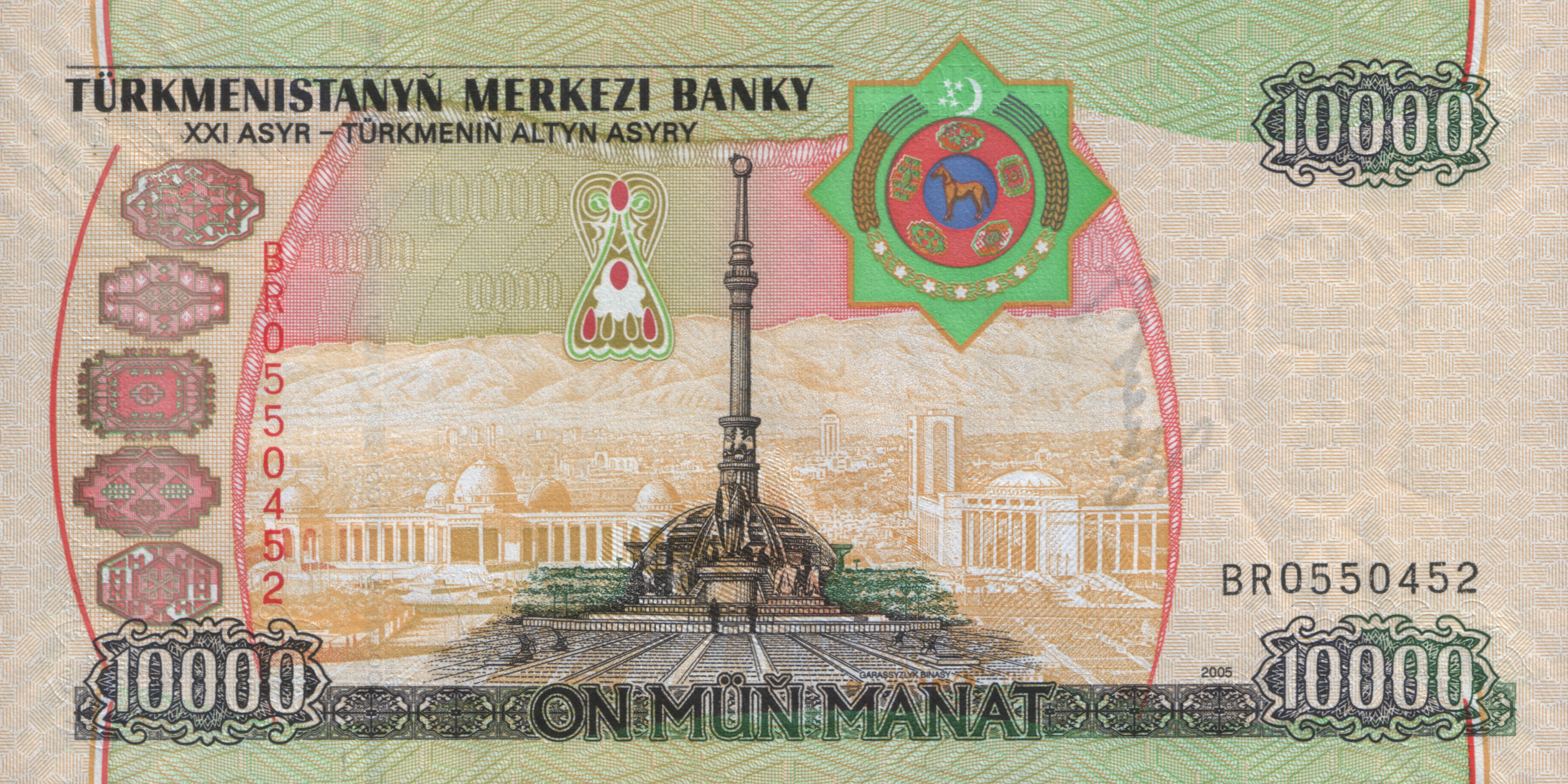
10,000 manats

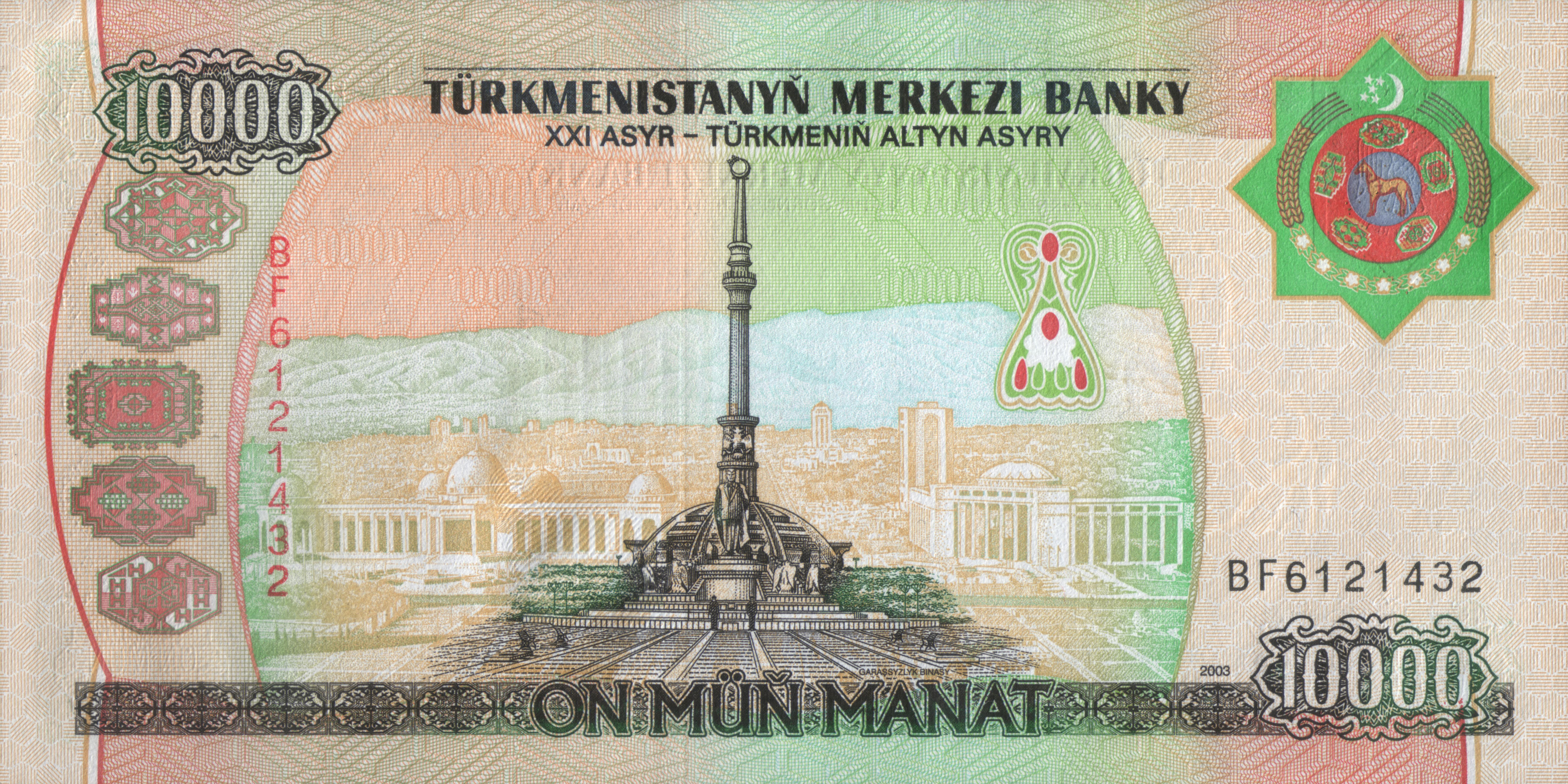
10,000 manats

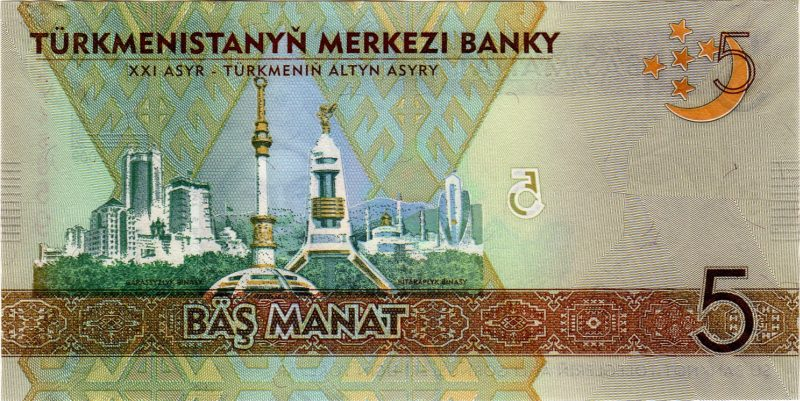
5 manats (2009 year)

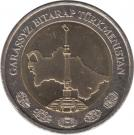
2 manat coin
