= Turkmen manat =

Currency of Turkmenistan

Manat
Türkmen manady (Turkmen)
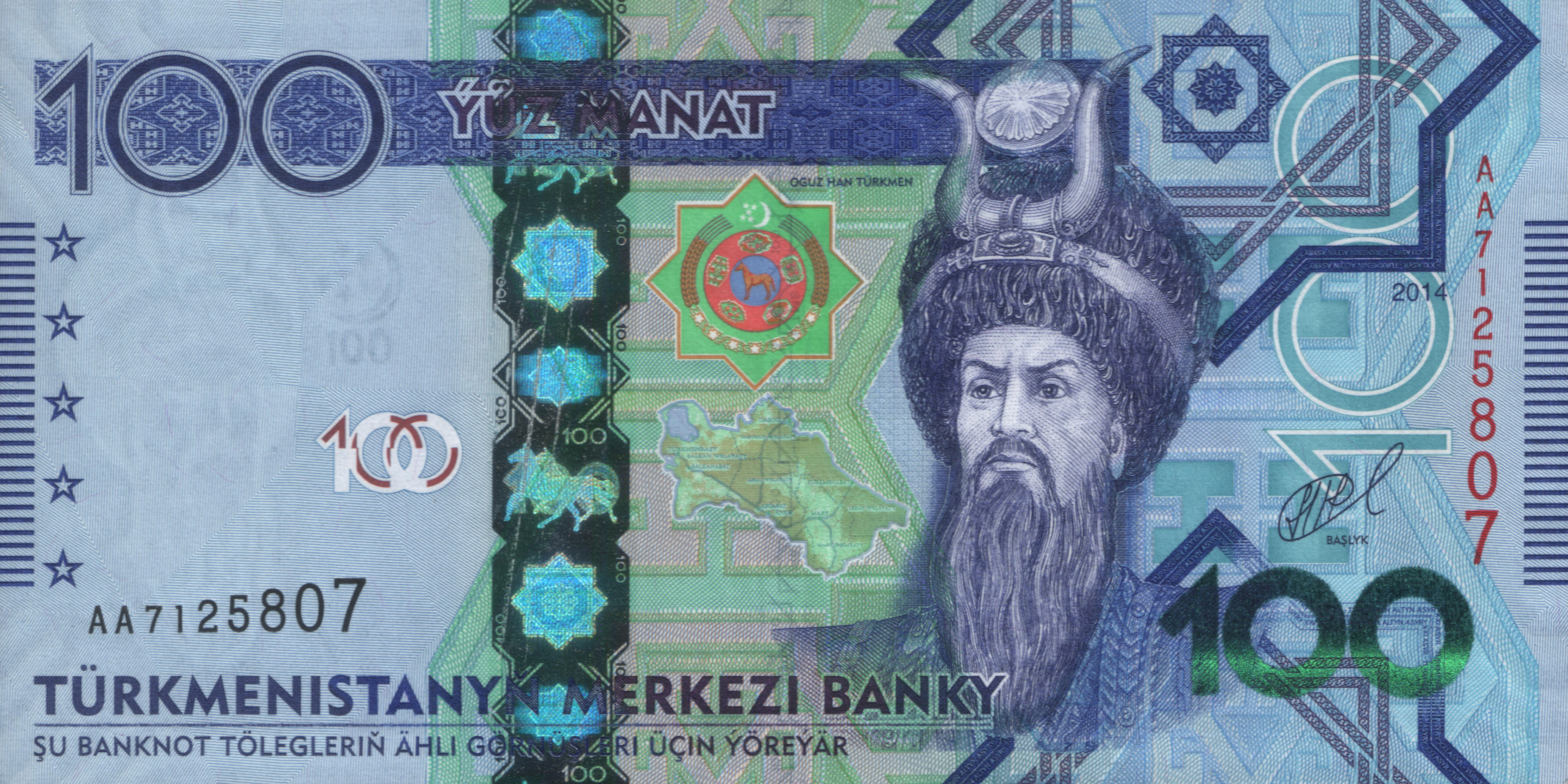
- 100 manat banknote

ISO 4217
- Code: TMT (numeric: 934)
- Subunit: 0.01

Unit
- Unit: manat
- Plural: The language(s) of this currency do(es) not have a morphological plural distinction.
- Symbol: m

Denominations
- Subunit
- 1/100: tenge
- Symbol
- tenge: t
- Banknotes
- Freq. used: 1, 5, 10, 20, 50, 100 and 200 manats
- Rarely used: 500 manats
- Coins
- Freq. used: 10, 20, 50 tenge, 1, 2 manats
- Rarely used: 1, 2, 5 tenge

Demographics
- User(s): Turkmenistan

Issuance
- Central bank: Central Bank of Turkmenistan
- Website: www.cbt.tm
- Printer: De La Rue
- Website: De La Rue
- Mint: Royal Mint
- Website: The Royal Mint

Valuation
- Inflation: 8.5%
- Source: The World Factbook, 2012 est.
- Pegged with: US dollar (USD); US$1 = 3.50 manats

The manat (Turkmen: manat; abbreviation: m; code: TMT) is the currency of Turkmenistan. The original manat was introduced on 1 November 1993, replacing the ruble at a rate of 1 manat = Rbls 500. The manat is subdivided into 100 tenge (Turkmen: teňňe).

Due to heavy inflation a new manat was introduced on 1 January 2009 at the rate of 5,000 old manats to 1 new manat.

== Etymology ==
The word "manat" is derived from the Russian word монета ("moneta") meaning "coin," which derived from Latin Monēta. It was used as the name of the Soviet currency in Turkmen (Turkmen: манат) and in Azerbaijani.

== Coins ==
In 1993, coins were introduced in denominations of 1, 5, 10, 20, and 50 tenge. The 1, 5, and 10 tenge were struck in copper-plated-steel, with the higher denominations in nickel-plated-steel. This first series of coins was short lived as their metal value soon became worth more than their actual face value. After a period of high inflation, new coins of 500 and 1,000 manats were introduced in 1999. All coins of this period had to depict the incumbent president by law.

Coins of the Turkmen manat (First manat)
Image		Value	Diameter (millimeters)	Composition	Description		Date of issue
Obverse	Reverse	Value	Diameter (millimeters)	Composition	Obverse	Reverse	Date of issue
		1 tenge	16 mm	Copper-plated steel	Saparmurat Niyazov	Value in center of flower-like design within circle	1993
		5 tenge	19.5 mm	Copper-plated steel	Saparmurat Niyazov	Value in center of flower-like design within circle	1993
		10 tenge	22.5 mm	Copper-plated steel	Saparmurat Niyazov	Value in center of flower-like design within circle	1993
		20 tenge	20.9 mm	Nickel-plated steel	Saparmurat Niyazov	Value in center of flower-like design within circle	1993
		50 tenge	24 mm	Nickel-plated steel	Saparmurat Niyazov	Value above Cornucopia with a goat head	1993
		500 manat	20.9 mm	Nickel-clad steel	Saparmurat Niyazov	Denomination, date below	1999
		1,000 manat	24 mm	Nickel-clad steel	Saparmurat Niyazov	Denomination, date below	1999
These images are to scale at 2.5 pixels per millimetre. For table standards, see the coin specification table.

During the monetary reform of 2009, new coins of 1, 2, 5, 10, 20, and 50 tenge were issued with bimetallic 1 and 2 manats following in 2010. The 1, 2, and 5 tenge coins are nickel-plated steel while the 10, 20, and 50 tenge coins are struck in brass. Instead of depicting the current head of state, the coins feature a map of Turkmenistan with the Independence Tower superimposed in front of it. All circulating coins of Turkmenistan are struck by the Royal Mint.

Coins of the Turkmen manat (Second manat)
Image		Value	Diameter (millimeters)	Composition	Description		Date of issue
Reverse	Obverse	Value	Diameter (millimeters)	Composition	Reverse	Obverse	Date of issue
		1 tenge	16 mm	Nickel-plated steel	Monument of Independence superimposed on the map of Turkmenistan, the text Turkmen: Garaşsyz Bitarap Türkmenistan, meaning "Independent Neutral Turkmenistan"	Denomination and date	2009
		2 tenge	18 mm	Nickel-plated steel	Monument of Independence superimposed on the map of Turkmenistan, the text Turkmen: Garaşsyz Bitarap Türkmenistan, meaning "Independent Neutral Turkmenistan"	Denomination and date	2009
		5 tenge	20 mm	Nickel-plated steel	Monument of Independence superimposed on the map of Turkmenistan, the text Turkmen: Garaşsyz Bitarap Türkmenistan, meaning "Independent Neutral Turkmenistan"	Denomination and date	2009
		10 tenge	22 mm	Brass	Monument of Independence superimposed on the map of Turkmenistan, the text Turkmen: Garaşsyz Bitarap Türkmenistan, meaning "Independent Neutral Turkmenistan"	Denomination and date	2009
		20 tenge	24 mm	Brass	Monument of Independence superimposed on the map of Turkmenistan, the text Turkmen: Garaşsyz Bitarap Türkmenistan, meaning "Independent Neutral Turkmenistan"	Denomination and date	2009
		50 tenge	26 mm	Brass	Monument of Independence superimposed on the map of Turkmenistan, the text Turkmen: Garaşsyz Bitarap Türkmenistan, meaning "Independent Neutral Turkmenistan"	Denomination and date	2009
		1 manat	27 mm	Bimetallic: copper-nickel center in brass ring	Monument of Independence superimposed on the map of Turkmenistan, the text Turkmen: Garaşsyz Bitarap Türkmenistan, meaning "Independent Neutral Turkmenistan"	Denomination and date	2010
		2 manat	28 mm	Bimetallic: brass center in copper-nickel ring	Monument of Independence superimposed on the map of Turkmenistan, the text Turkmen: Garaşsyz Bitarap Türkmenistan, meaning "Independent Neutral Turkmenistan"	Denomination and date	2010
These images are to scale at 2.5 pixels per millimetre. For table standards, see the coin specification table.

== Banknotes ==
=== First manat (TMM, 1993—2009) ===
First Turkmen manat
- 500 manat banknote of the first manat.

ISO 4217
- Code: TMM

Denominations
- Banknotes: 1, 5, 10, 20, 50, 100, 500, 1,000, 5,000, and 10,000 manat
- Coins: 1, 2, 5, 10, 20, and 50 tenge, 500 and 1,000 manat

Demographics
- User(s): Turkmenistan

Valuation
- Inflation: 992.39%
- Source: Statista, 1996 est.
- This infobox shows the latest status before this currency was rendered obsolete.

In 1993, manat notes were introduced in denominations of 1, 5, 10, 20, 50, 100, and 500 manat, replacing the Soviet ruble. These were followed by notes for 1,000 manat in 1995 and 5,000 and 10,000 manat in 1996. In 2005, a new series of notes was introduced in denominations of 50, 100, 500, 1,000, 5,000, and 10,000 manat. All notes, with exception of the 1 and 5 manat banknotes bear a portrait of former president Saparmurat Atayevich Niyazov Turkmenbashi. All Turkmen banknotes are produced by the De La Rue printing and banknote company.

Banknotes of the Turkmenistan manat (First manat)
Image		Value	Dimensions (millimeters)	Main Color	Description		Date of issue	Date of first issue	Watermark
Obverse	Reverse	Value	Dimensions (millimeters)	Main Color	Obverse	Reverse	Date of issue	Date of first issue	Watermark
		1 manat	120 × 60 mm	Orange and red	Ylymlar academy, Aşgabat	Ilarslanyn Ýadygarligi mausoleum	1993		
		5 manat	125 × 62.5 mm	Blue	Bazçylyk Okuw Polytechnic Institute, Aşgabat	Abu Seýidiň mausoleum	1993		
		10 manat	133 × 66 mm	Brown	Turkmenistan Relationship building (Aşgabat), President Saparmurat Niyazov (1940–2006)	Tekesiň mausoleum	1993		
		20 manat	139 × 69 mm	Blue and white	National library (Aşgabat), President Saparmurat Niyazov	Astanababa mausoleum	1993; 1995		
		50 manat	144 × 72 mm	Orange and brown	Soviet Honor monument, President Saparmurat Niyazov	Anew mosque	1993; 1995		
		100 manat	150 × 75 mm	Blue and orange	Prezident Köşgi (President's Palace, Aşgabat), President Saparmurat Niyazov	Sultan Sanjariň mausoleum	1993; 1995		
		500 manat	156 × 78 mm	Red and violet	National theatre (Aşgabat), President Saparmurat Niyazov	Törebeg Hanymyň mausoleum	1993; 1995		
		1,000 manat	156 × 78 mm	Green and red	Prezident Köşgi (President's Palace, Aşgabat), President Saparmurat Niyazov	National emblem of Turkmenistan	1995		
		5,000 manat	156 × 78 mm	Violet	Prezident Köşgi (President's Palace, Aşgabat), President Saparmurat Niyazov	National emblem of Turkmenistan	1996		
		10,000 manat	156 × 78 mm	Blue and brown	Prezident Köşgi (President's Palace, Aşgabat), President Saparmurat Niyazov	National emblem of Turkmenistan	1996; 1999; 2000		
		10,000 manat	156 × 78 mm	Blue and brown	Türkmenbaşi Köşgi (Turkmenbashi's Palace, Aşgabat), President Saparmurat Niyazov	Saparmurat Haji mosque	1998; 1999		
		10,000 manat	156 × 78 mm	Blue and brown	Türkmenbaşi Köşgi (Turkmenbashi's Palace, Aşgabat), President Saparmurat Niyazov	Neutrality Monument, Ruhyýet Palace, Aşgabat	2000		
		10,000 manat	156 × 78 mm	Light brown	Türkmenbaşi Köşgi (Turkmenbashi's Palace, Aşgabat), President Saparmurat Niyazov	Monument of Independence and Peace, Aşgabat	2003; 2005		

=== First manat (second issue) ===
In 2005, a new series of manat banknotes was introduced. They had originally been intended to replace the first manat at a fixed rate, with 1 equal to 1,000 of the first manat, but the revaluation was postponed and this issue was released to circulate with previous manat issues. The series of notes was introduced in denominations of 50, 100, 500, 1,000, 5,000, and 10,000 manats. Two new coins were also introduced in only two denominations, 500 and 1,000 manats. Both the first and second issue manat banknotes circulated in tandem until the issue of the redenominated issue in 2009.

Banknotes of the first manat, second issue
Image		Value	Dimensions	Main colour	Description			Date of			Ref.
Obverse	Reverse	Value	Dimensions	Main colour	Obverse	Reverse	Watermark	printing	issue	withdrawal	Ref.
		50 manat	144 × 72 mm	Purple	Emblem of Turkmenistan, Saparmurat Niyazov	Yanardag, Aşgabat Hippodrome	Saparmurat Niyazov and his signature	2005	c. 2005	31 December 2010	
		100 manat	150 × 75 mm	Red	Emblem of Turkmenistan, Saparmurat Niyazov	Central Bank building, Ashgabat	Saparmurat Niyazov and his signature	2005	c. 2005	31 December 2010	
		500 manat	156 × 78 mm	Brown	Emblem of Turkmenistan, Saparmurat Niyazov	Turkmen jewellery	Saparmurat Niyazov and his signature	2005	c. 2005	31 December 2010	
		1,000 manat	156 × 78 mm	Green	Emblem of Turkmenistan, Saparmurat Niyazov	Oguzhan Presidential Palace, Aşgabat	Saparmurat Niyazov and his signature	2005	c. 2005	31 December 2010	
		5,000 manat	156 × 78 mm	Blue	Emblem of Turkmenistan, Saparmurat Niyazov	Oguzhan Presidential Palace, Aşgabat	Saparmurat Niyazov and his signature	2005	c. 2005	31 December 2010	
These images are to scale at 0.7 pixel per millimetre (18 pixel per inch). For table standards, see the banknote specification table.

=== Second manat (since 2009) ===
After hyperinflation significantly devalued the currency, a new manat with a fixed exchange rate was introduced, replacing the old manat on a ratio of 5,000 old manats = 1 new manat. Banknotes in this series were printed in denominations of 1, 5, 10, 20, 50, 100, and 500 manats. As part of an effort by the Turkmen government to dismantle Niyazov's extensive cult of personality and help politically disambiguate the current rule, only the highest valued banknote, 500 manats, bears a portrait of the former leader. The 500 manat note has yet to be released into circulation. The other denominations feature images of buildings in Ashgabat or technological achievements (TurkmenSat 1) and portraits of Ahmed Sanjar, Oghuz Khan, Magtymguly Pyragy and other figures in Turkmen history.

In December 2025, polymer banknotes in denominations of 1, 5, 10, and 200 manats were issued to commemorate the 30th anniversary of Turkmenistan's declaration of neutrality.

Banknotes of the second manat
Image		Value	Dimensions	Main colour	Description			Date of			Ref.
Obverse	Reverse	Value	Dimensions	Main colour	Obverse	Reverse	Watermark	printing	issue	withdrawal	Ref.
		1 manat	120 × 60 mm	Green and orange	Emblem of Turkmenistan, Togrul Beg Türkmen	Turkmenistan Cultural Centre, Ashgabat	Togrul Beg Türkmen, crescent moon and five stars from the flag, denomination	2009; 2012; 2014	1 January 2009	Current	
		1 manat	120 × 60 mm	Green and orange	As above, with the 2017 Asian Indoor and Martial Arts Games logo	Ashgabat International Airport, TurkmenSat 1	Togrul Beg Türkmen, crescent moon and five stars from the flag, denomination	2017	17 September 2017	Current	
		1 manat	120 × 60 mm	Green and orange	As above, with the 25th anniversary of neutrality logo	Turkmenbashi International Seaport, TurkmenSat 1	Togrul Beg Türkmen, crescent moon and five stars from the flag, denomination	2020	12 December 2020	Current	
		1 manat	120 × 60 mm	Green and orange	As above, with the 30th anniversary of neutrality logo	Turkmenbashi International Seaport, TurkmenSat 1	Togrul Beg Türkmen	2025	1 December 2025	Current	
		5 manat	126 × 63 mm	Brown	Emblem of Turkmenistan, Soltan Sanjar Türkmen	Independence and Neutrality Monuments, Ashgabat	Soltan Sanjar Türkmen, crescent moon and five stars from the flag, denomination	2009; 2012	1 January 2009	Current	
		5 manat	126 × 63 mm	Brown	As above, with the 2017 Asian Indoor and Martial Arts Games logo	Ashgabat Velodrome	Soltan Sanjar Türkmen, crescent moon and five stars from the flag, denomination	2017	17 September 2017	Current	
		5 manat	126 × 63 mm	Brown	As above, with the 25th anniversary of neutrality logo	Independence and Neutrality Monuments, Ashgabat	Soltan Sanjar Türkmen, crescent moon and five stars from the flag, denomination	2020	12 December 2020	Current	
		5 manat	126 × 63 mm	Brown	As above, with the 30th anniversary of neutrality logo	Independence and Neutrality Monuments, Ashgabat	Soltan Sanjar Türkmen	2025	12 December 2025	Current	
		10 manat	132 × 66 mm	Red	Emblem of Turkmenistan, Magtymguly Pyragy	Central Bank building, Ashgabat	Magtymguly Pyragy, crescent moon and five stars from the flag, denomination	2009; 2012	1 January 2009	Current	
		10 manat	132 × 66 mm	Red	As above, with the 2017 Asian Indoor and Martial Arts Games logo	Martial Arts Arena, Ashgabat	Magtymguly Pyragy, crescent moon and five stars from the flag, denomination	2017	17 September 2017	Current	
		10 manat	132 × 66 mm	Red	As above, with the 25th anniversary of neutrality logo	Central Bank building, Ashgabat	Magtymguly Pyragy, crescent moon and five stars from the flag, denomination	2020	12 December 2020	Current	
		10 manat	132 × 66 mm	Red	As above, with the 30th anniversary of neutrality logo	Central Bank building, Ashgabat	Magtymguly Pyragy	2025	1 December 2025	Current	
		20 manat	138 × 69 mm	Purple	Emblem of Turkmenistan, Görogly Beg Türkmen	Rukhyet Palace, Ashgabat	Görogly Beg Türkmen, crescent moon and five stars from the flag, denomination	2009; 2012	1 January 2009	Current	
		20 manat	138 × 69 mm	Purple	As above, with the 2017 Asian Indoor and Martial Arts Games logo	Main Indoor Arena, Ashgabat	Görogly Beg Türkmen, crescent moon and five stars from the flag, denomination	2017	17 September 2017	Current	
		20 manat	138 × 69 mm	Purple	As above, with the 25th anniversary of neutrality logo	Rukhyet Palace, Ashgabat	Görogly Beg Türkmen, crescent moon and five stars from the flag, denomination	2020	12 December 2020	Current	
		50 manat	144 × 72 mm	Green	Emblem of Turkmenistan, Gorgut Ata Türkmen	Assembly of Turkmenistan building, Ashgabat	Gorgut Ata Türkmen, crescent moon and five stars from the flag, denomination	2009; 2014	1 January 2009	Current	
		50 manat	144 × 72 mm	Green	As above, with the 2017 Asian Indoor and Martial Arts Games logo	Indoor Athletics Arena, Ashgabat	Gorgut Ata Türkmen, crescent moon and five stars from the flag, denomination	2017	17 September 2017	Current	
		50 manat	144 × 72 mm	Green	As above, with the 25th anniversary of neutrality logo	Assembly of Turkmenistan building, Ashgabat	Gorgut Ata Türkmen, crescent moon and five stars from the flag, denomination	2020	12 December 2020	Current	
		100 manat	150 × 75 mm	Blue	Emblem of Turkmenistan, Oguz Khan Türkmen	Oguzhan Presidential Palace, Ashgabat	Oguz Khan Türkmen, crescent moon and five stars from the flag, denomination	2009; 2014	1 January 2009	Current	
		100 manat	150 × 75 mm	Blue	As above, with the 2017 Asian Indoor and Martial Arts Games logo	Olympic Stadium, Ashgabat	Oguz Khan Türkmen, crescent moon and five stars from the flag, denomination	2017	17 September 2017	Current	
		100 manat	150 × 75 mm	Blue	As above, with the 25th anniversary of neutrality logo	Oguzhan Presidential Palace, Ashgabat	Oguz Khan Türkmen, crescent moon and five stars from the flag, denomination	2020	12 December 2020	Current	
		200 manat	150 × 75 mm	Olive Green	Emblem of Turkmenistan, Map of Turkmenistan, Arkadag Monument, 30th anniversary of neutrality logo	Arkadag City Administration building	Arkadag Monument, moon and five stars from the national flag	2025	1 December 2025	Current	
		500 manat	156 × 78 mm	Orange	Emblem of Turkmenistan, Saparmurat Niyazov	Türkmenbaşy Ruhy Mosque, Gypjak	Saparmurat Niyazov, crescent moon and five stars from the flag, denomination	2009	Never issued		
These images are to scale at 0.7 pixel per millimetre (18 pixel per inch). For table standards, see the banknote specification table.

=== Exchange rates ===
The exchange rate is fixed.

- Before Apr 2009: US$1 = 1.04 manat
- Apr 2009 - Jan 2015: US$1 = 2.85 manats
- Jan 2015 onwards: US$1 = 3.5 manats

A black market for exchange rate exists as cash exchanges are forbidden by law in Turkmenistan. The parallel exchange rate varied between 40–41m per U.S. dollar as of 10 April 2021.

Current TMT exchange rates
From Google Finance:	AUD CAD CHF CNY EUR GBP HKD JPY USD RUB
From Yahoo! Finance:	AUD CAD CHF CNY EUR GBP HKD JPY USD RUB
From XE.com:	AUD CAD CHF CNY EUR GBP HKD JPY USD RUB
From OANDA:	AUD CAD CHF CNY EUR GBP HKD JPY USD RUB

== See also ==
- Economy of Turkmenistan
- Azerbaijani manat

== Notes ==
First manat
Preceded by: Russian rouble Reason: independence from the USSR; Ratio: 1 first manat = 500 roubles	Currency of Turkmenistan; 1 November 1993 – 31 December 2008	Succeeded by: Second manat Reason: inflation Ratio: 1 second manat = 5,000 first manats

Second manat
Preceded by: First manat Reason: inflation Ratio: 1 second manat = 5,000 first manats	Currency of Turkmenistan; 1 January 2009 –	Succeeded by: Current
