= Turkmen Puppet Theatre =

Turkmen State Puppet Theatre
- Interactive map of Turkmen State Puppet Theatre
- Address: Garashsyzlyk Avenue, 73; Ashgabat; Turkmenistan
- Capacity: 200 + 300 seats
- Type: Puppet theatre

Construction
- Rebuilt: 2005
- Years active: Since 2005
- Architect: Polimeks

The Turkmen State Puppet Theatre (Turkmen: Türkmen Döwlet gurjak teatry) is located on Garashsyzlyk Avenue of Ashgabat. It was built in 2005 by Turkish company Polimeks. Is the only puppet theater in Turkmenistan. The repertoire of the troupe has nearly 40 plays.

== History ==
The building was built in 2004–2005 by Turkish construction company Polimeks in Avenue Garashsyzlyk. The cost of the building - $15 million. Building area Puppet Theater 7600 square meters. Performances are held in two halls with 300 and 200 seats.
