= 50 manat =

Banknote denomination

50 manat - (Azerbaijani: Əlli manat, Turkmen: Elli manat) is a denomination of banknotes used in Azerbaijan and Turkmenistan.

== Features of banknotes ==
Countries	Image		Dimensions	Main Color	Description		Date of issue
Countries	Obverse	Reverse	Dimensions	Main Color	Obverse	Reverse	Date of issue
(Azerbaijan)			125×63	Red Grey	Maiden's Tower	the inscription "AZƏRBAYCAN MİLLİ BANKI" and the denomination of "ƏLLİ manat"	1993
(Turkmenistan)			144×72	Brown	The portrait of Saparmurat Niyazov, Memorial Monument of the soldiers of Turkmenistan fallen during Great Patriotic War	The mosque in Anau	1993
(Turkmenistan)			144×72	Violet (color)	Portrait of Saparmurat Niyazov	Akhal-Teke	2005

== Banknotes in circulation ==
Countries	Image		Dimensions	Main Color	Description		Date of issue
Countries	Obverse	Reverse	Dimensions	Main Color	Obverse	Reverse	Date of issue
(Azerbaijan)			148 × 70	Yellow	Youth, steps (as a symbol of progress), the Sun (as a symbol of power and light), as well as chemical and mathematical signs (as a symbol of science)	The map of Azerbaijan on the background of national carpet ornaments	2005
(Turkmenistan)			148 × 70	Green, Grey	Youth, steps (as a symbol of progress), the Sun (as a symbol of power and light), as well as chemical and mathematical signs (as a symbol of science)	The map of Azerbaijan on the background of national carpet ornaments	2009
(Turkmenistan)			144×72	Green, Grey	The portrait of Gorkut Ata	The building of the National Assembly of Turkmenistan	2014

== See also ==
- Azerbaijani manat
- Turkmenistani manat
