= Azerbaijani manat =

Currency of Azerbaijan

Manat
Azərbaycan manatı (Azerbaijani)
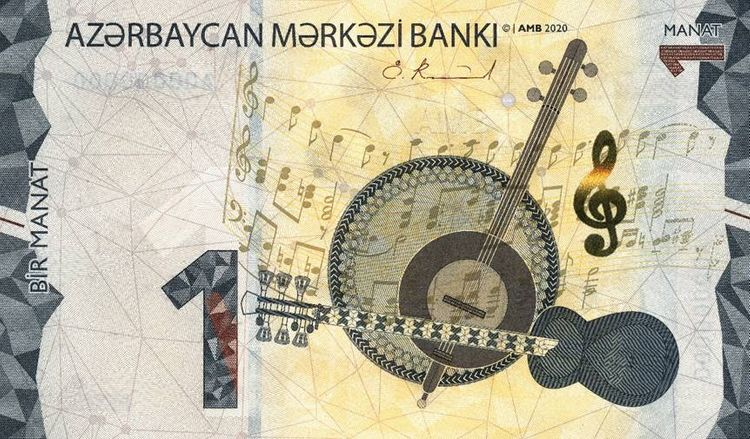

ISO 4217
- Code: AZN (numeric: 944) before 2006: AZM, AYM
- Subunit: 0.01

Unit
- Unit: manat
- Plural: The language(s) of this currency do(es) not have a morphological plural distinction.
- Symbol: ₼

Denominations
- Subunit
- 1/100: Gapik
- Banknotes
- Freq. used: ₼1, ₼5, ₼10, ₼20, ₼50, ₼100
- Rarely used: ₼200, ₼500
- Coins: 1, 3, 5, 10, 20, 50 gapiks

Demographics
- Replaced: Russian ruble
- User(s): Azerbaijan

Issuance
- Central bank: Central Bank of Azerbaijan
- Website: www.cbar.az

Valuation
- Inflation: 8.8%, December 2023

The manat (ISO code: AZN; sign: ₼; abbreviation: m) is the currency of Azerbaijan. It is subdivided into 100 gapiks.

The first iteration of the currency emerged in the Azerbaijan Democratic Republic and its successor, the Azerbaijan Soviet Socialist Republic, with the issues happening in 1919–1923. The currency underwent hyperinflation, and was eventually substituted by the Transcaucasian ruble, which, in its turn, was converted to the Soviet ruble.

When Azerbaijan gained independence from the Soviet Union, it substituted the Soviet ruble with the manat, which also went through a period of high inflation in the first years, rendering the coinage obsolete. The current manat in circulation has existed since the redenomination in 2006, when old manats (AZM) were substituted with lower face values and new design. The currency has mostly been pegged to the US dollar, at what is now the rate of ₼1.70 to US$1.

The Azerbaijani manat symbol was added to Unicode as U+20BC ₼ MANAT SIGN in 2013. A lowercase m was used previously, and may still be encountered when the manat symbol is unavailable.

== Etymology ==
The word "manat" is derived from the Latin word "monēta" and the Russian word "монета" ("moneta") meaning "coin". It was used as the name of the Soviet currency in Azeri (Azerbaijani: манат) and in Turkmen.

== First manat, 1919–1923 ==
The Azerbaijan Democratic Republic and its successor, the Azerbaijani Soviet Socialist Republic issued their own currency between 1919 and 1923. The currency was called the manat (منات) in Azerbaijani and the ruble (рубль) in Russian, with the denominations written in both languages (and sometimes also in French) on the banknotes. The manat replaced the first Transcaucasian ruble at par, and was replaced by the second Transcaucasian ruble after Azerbaijan became part of the Transcaucasian Soviet Federal Socialist Republic. No subdivisions were issued, and the currency only existed as banknotes.

=== Banknotes ===
The Democratic Republic issued notes in denominations of 25, 50, 100, 250, and 500 manats, whilst the Soviet Socialist Republic issued notes in denominations of 5, 100, 1,000, 5,000, 10,000, 25,000, 50,000, 100,000, 250,000, 1 million, and 5 million manats.

== Second manat, 1992–2006 ==
The second manat was introduced on 15 August 1992. It had the ISO 4217 code AZM and replaced the Russian ruble which itself replaced the Soviet ruble at a rate of RUR 10 to 1 manat.

From early 2002 to early 2005, the exchange rate was fairly stable (varying within a band of 4,770–4,990 manats per US dollar). Starting in the spring of 2005 there was a slight but steady increase in the value of the manat against the US dollar; the reason most likely being the increased flow of petrodollars into the country, together with the generally high price of oil on the world market. At the end of 2005, one dollar was worth 4,591 manats. Banknotes below 100 manats had effectively disappeared by 2005, as had the gapik coins.

=== Coins ===
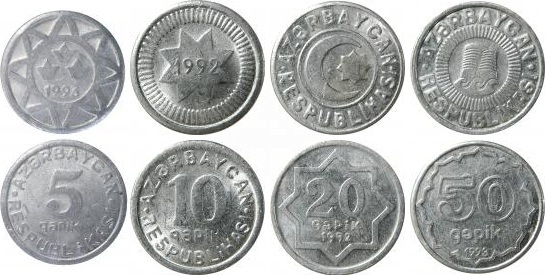
Gapik coins of the second manat

Coins were issued in denominations of 5, 10, 20, and 50 gapiks, dated 1992 and 1993. Although brass and cupronickel were used for some of the 1992 issues, later issues were all in aluminium. These coins were rarely used in circulation.

=== Banknotes ===
The following banknotes were issued for this currency

- 1, 5, 10, 250 manats (all first issued on 15 August 1992)
- 50, 100, 500, 1,000 manats (all first issued in early 1993)
- 10,000 manats (first issued in August 1994)
- 50,000 manats (first issued in May 1996)

| Image | | Value | Size (mm) | Main colours | Description | | Print |
| Obverse | Reverse | Value | Size (mm) | Main colours | Obverse | Reverse | Print |
|---|---|---|---|---|---|---|---|
| | | 1 manat | 125×63 | pink | Maiden Tower in Baku | inscription «AZƏRBAYCAN MİLLİ BANKI» | 1992 |
| | | 1 manat | 125×63 | yellow, blue | Maiden Tower in Baku | inscription «AZƏRBAYCAN MİLLİ BANKI» and denomination «BİR manat» | 1993 |
| | | 5 manats | 125×63 | brown, violet | Maiden Tower in Baku | inscription «AZƏRBAYCAN MİLLİ BANKI» and denomination «BEŞ manat» | 1993 |
| | | 10 manats | 125×63 | brown | Maiden Tower in Baku | inscription «AZƏRBAYCAN MİLLİ BANKI» | 1992 |
| | | 10 manats | 125×63 | teal | Maiden Tower in Baku | inscription «AZƏRBAYCAN MİLLİ BANKI» and denomination «ON manat» | 1993 |
| | | 50 manats | 125×63 | red, grey | Maiden Tower in Baku | inscription «AZƏRBAYCAN MİLLİ BANKI» and denomination «ƏLLİ manat» | 1993, 1999 |
| | | 100 manats | 125×63 | pink, blue | Maiden Tower in Baku | inscription «AZƏRBAYCAN MİLLİ BANKI» and denomination «YÜZ manat» | 1993, 1999 |
| | | 250 manats | 125×63 | green | Maiden Tower in Baku | inscription «AZƏRBAYCAN MİLLİ BANKI» | 1992, 1999 |
| | | 500 manats | 125×63 | brown, blue and orange | Portrait of Nizami Ganjavi | inscription «AZƏRBAYCAN MİLLİ BANKI» and denomination «BEŞ YÜZ manat» | 1993, 1999 |
| | | 1,000 manats | 125×63 | brown and blue | Portrait of Mahammad Amin Rasulzade | inscription «AZƏRBAYCAN MİLLİ BANKI» and denomination «min 1000 manat» | 1993, 1999 |
| | | 1,000 manats | 125×63 | blue | Oil industry theme | inscription «AZƏRBAYCAN MİLLİ BANKI» and denomination «MİN 1000 manat» | 2001 |
| | | 10,000 manats | 130×65 | brown | Palace of the Shirvanshahs | inscription «AZƏRBAYCAN MİLLİ BANKI» and denomination «ON MİN 10 000 manat» | 1994 |
| | | 50,000 manats | 132×66 | green | Momine Khatun Mausoleum | inscription «AZƏRBAYCAN MİLLİ BANKI» and denomination «ƏLLİ MİN 50 000 manat» | 1995 |

== Third manat, 2006 ==
On 1 January 2006, a new manat (ISO 4217 code AZN, also called the "manat (national currency)") was introduced at a ratio of 1 new manat to 5,000 old manats. From 1 October 2005, prices were indicated both in new manats and in old manats to ease the transition. Coins denominated in qəpik, which had not been used from 1993 onward due to inflation, were reintroduced with the re-denomination. The former manat (ISO code 4217 AZM) remained in use through to 31 December 2006.

=== Symbol ===
The new banknotes and Azerbaijani manat symbol, ₼, were designed by Robert Kalina in 2006, and the symbol was added to Unicode (U+20BC) in 2013, after failed addition proposals between 2008 and 2011. The final Azerbaijani Manat symbol design was inspired by the design of the Euro sign (€), based on an initial proposal by Mykyta Yevstifeyev, and resembles a single-bar Euro sign rotated 90° clockwise. The manat symbol is displayed to the right of the amount in Azeri and Turkmen.

=== Code ===
The new manat was initially assigned the code AYM on being added to the ISO 4217 standard on 1 June 2005, with an effective date of 1 January 2006. However, this was removed and replaced by AZN on 13 October 2005 as it did not comply with the ISO 4217 currency coding standardization rules (which state that currency codes must begin with the ISO 3166-1 alpha-2 code for the relevant country).

=== Coins ===
Coins in circulation are 1, 3, 5, 10, 20 and 50 gapiks. Most coins closely resemble the size and shape of various euro coins. Most notably the bimetallic 50 gapik (similar to the €2 coin) and the 10 gapik (Spanish flower, like the 20 euro cent coin). Coins were first put into circulation during January 2006 and do not feature a mint year.

Coins of the manat (2006)
| Image | Value | Technical parameters | | | Description | | | Issued from |
| Image | Value | Diameter (mm) | Mass (g) | Composition | Edge | Obverse | Reverse | Issued from |
|---|---|---|---|---|---|---|---|---|
| | 1 gapik | 16.25 | 2.80 | Copper-plated steel | Smooth | Map of Azerbaijan; value; lettering: Azərbaycan; Respublikası | Traditional musical instruments; value | 2006 |
| | 3 gapiks | 18.00 | 3.45 | Copper-plated steel | Grooved | Map of Azerbaijan; value; lettering: Azərbaycan; Respublikası | Books and quill; value | 2006 |
| | 5 gapiks | 19.75 | 4.85 | Copper-plated steel | Reeded | Map of Azerbaijan; value; lettering: Azərbaycan; Respublikası | Maiden Tower; value | 2006 |
| | 10 gapiks | 22.25 | 5.10 | Brass-plated steel | Spanish flower | Map of Azerbaijan; value; lettering: Azərbaycan; Respublikası | Nagorno-Karabakh military helmet; value | 2006 |
| | 20 gapiks | 24.25 | 6.60 | Brass-plated steel | Interrupted reeding | Map of Azerbaijan; value; lettering: Azərbaycan; Respublikası | Spiral staircase; geometrical symbols; value | 2006 |
| | 50 gapiks | 25.50 | 7.70 | Outer: Stainless steel | Reeded lettering: AZƏRBAYCAN; RESPUBLIKASI ☾ ★ AZƏRBAYCAN; RESPUBLIKASI ☾ ★ | Map of Azerbaijan; value; lettering: Azərbaycan; Respublikası | Two oil wells; value | 2006 |
| | 50 gapiks | 25.50 | 7.70 | Inner: Brass-plated steel | Reeded lettering: AZƏRBAYCAN; RESPUBLIKASI ☾ ★ AZƏRBAYCAN; RESPUBLIKASI ☾ ★ | Map of Azerbaijan; value; lettering: Azərbaycan; Respublikası | Two oil wells; value | 2006 |
For table standards, see the coin specification table.

=== Banknotes ===
Banknotes in circulation are ₼1, ₼5, ₼10, ₼20, ₼50, ₼100, ₼200, and ₼500. They were designed by Austrian banknote designer Robert Kalina, who also designed the current banknotes of the euro and the Syrian pound. The notes look quite similar to those of the euro, and the choice of motifs was inspired by the euro banknotes.

In 2009, the Azərbaycan Milli Bankı (National Bank of Azerbaijan) was renamed the Azərbaycan Respublikasının Mərkəzi Bankı (Central Bank of Azerbaijan). In 2010, the ₼1 banknote was issued with the new name of the issuing bank, in 2012 a ₼5 banknote was issued with the new name of the issuing bank and in 2017 a 100₼ banknote dated 2013 was issued with the new name of the issuing bank.

In 2011 Azerbaijan's Ministry of Finance announced it was considering issuing notes of ₼2 and ₼3 as well as notes with values higher than ₼100. In February 2013, the Central Bank of Azerbaijan announced it would not introduce higher denomination notes until at least 2014.

In 2018, a ₼200 banknote was issued to commemorate Heydar Aliyev's 95th birthday.

Redesigned ₼1, ₼5, and ₼50 banknotes were introduced in 2021, preserving the same motifs but with updated designs. These circulate in parallel with existing notes.

A new commemorative ₼500 banknote was introduced in 2021.

==== 2005 series ====
| Image | | Value | Dimensions | Main Color | Description | | Year |
| Obverse | Reverse | Value | Dimensions | Main Color | Obverse | Reverse | Year |
|---|---|---|---|---|---|---|---|
| | | ₼1 | 120 × 70 mm | Grey | Theme: Culture Azerbaijani folk music instruments (daf, kamancheh, tar) | Ornaments of regional carpets | 2005 |
| | | ₼1 | 120 × 70 mm | Grey | Theme: Culture Azerbaijani folk music instruments (daf, kamancheh, tar) | Ornaments of regional carpets | 2009, 2017 |
| | | ₼5 | 127 × 70 mm | Orange | Theme: Writing and literature Writers, poets, and books from Azerbaijan, with a written excerpt of the national anthem (Namusunu hifz etmeyə, Bayrağını yükseltməyə, Çümlə gənclər müştaqdır! Şanlı Vətən! Şanlı Vətən! Azərbaycan! Azərbaycan!) and letters from the contemporary Azerbaijani alphabet (ə, ö, ğ, ş) | Rock drawings of Gobustan, samples of Old Turkic script | 2005 |
| | | ₼5 | 127 × 70 mm | Orange | Theme: Writing and literature Writers, poets, and books from Azerbaijan, with a written excerpt of the national anthem (Namusunu hifz etmeyə, Bayrağını yükseltməyə, Çümlə gənclər müştaqdır! Şanlı Vətən! Şanlı Vətən! Azərbaycan! Azərbaycan!) and letters from the contemporary Azerbaijani alphabet (ə, ö, ğ, ş) | Rock drawings of Gobustan, samples of Old Turkic script | 2009, 2017 |
| | | ₼10 | 134 × 70 mm | Teal | Theme: History Old Baku, the Palace of the Shirvanshahs and the Maiden Tower against a background of the Icheri Sheher wall | Ornaments of regional carpets | 2005 |
| | | ₼10 | 134 × 70 mm | Teal | Theme: History Old Baku, the Palace of the Shirvanshahs and the Maiden Tower against a background of the Icheri Sheher wall | Ornaments of regional carpets | 2018 |
| | | ₼20 | 141 × 70 mm | Green | Theme: Karabakh Signs of power (a sword, a helmet and a shield) | Symbol of peace (harybulbul) | 2005 |
| | | ₼50 | 148 × 70 mm | Yellow | Theme: History and future Youth, stairs (as a symbol of progress), the sun (as a symbol of force and light) and chemical and mathematical symbols (as signs of science) | Ornaments of regional carpets | 2005 |
| | | ₼100 | 155 × 70 mm | Mauve | Theme: Economy and development Architectural symbols from antiquity up to today, the manat currency symbol (₼) and symbols of economic growth | Ornaments of regional carpets | 2005 |
| | | ₼100 | 155 × 70 mm | Mauve | Theme: Economy and development Architectural symbols from antiquity up to today, the manat currency symbol (₼) and symbols of economic growth | Ornaments of regional carpets | 2013 |
| | | ₼200 | 160 × 70 mm | Blue | Theme: Modern architecture The Heydar Aliyev Center, Baku | Ornaments of regional carpets | 2018 |

==== 2020 refurbishment ====
| Image | | Value | Dimensions | Main Color | Description | | Year |
| Obverse | Reverse | Value | Dimensions | Main Color | Obverse | Reverse | Year |
|---|---|---|---|---|---|---|---|
| | | ₼1 | 120 × 70 mm | Grey | Theme: Culture Azerbaijani folk music instruments (daf, kamancheh, tar) | Map of Azerbaijan | 2020 |
| | | ₼5 | 127 × 70 mm | Orange | Theme: Writing and literature Writers, poets, and books from Azerbaijan, with the lyrics of the full Azərbaycan marşı | Map of Azerbaijan | 2020 |
| | | ₼10 | 134 × 70 mm | Teal | Theme: History Old Baku, the Palace of the Shirvanshahs and the Maiden Tower against a background of the Icheri Sheher wall | Map of Azerbaijan | 2022 |
| | | ₼20 | 141 × 70 mm | Green | Theme: Karabakh Signs of power (a sword, a helmet and a shield) | Map of Azerbaijan | 2022 |
| | | ₼50 | 148 × 70 mm | Yellow and brown | Theme: History and future Youth, stairs (as a symbol of progress), the sun (as a symbol of force and light) and chemical and mathematical symbols (as signs of science) | Map of Azerbaijan | 2020 |
| | | ₼100 | | Mauve | Theme: Economy and growth | Map of Azerbaijan | 2026 |
| | | ₼500 (commemorative) | 165 × 70 mm | Brown, red, green and blue | Theme: The 2020 Karabakh War Poppies, Khodaafarin stone bridges | Mausoleum of Molla Panah Vagif; Askeran fortress | 2021 |

=== Exchange rates ===
- Before Feb 2015: US$1 = ₼0.78
- Feb - Dec 2015: US$1 = ₼1.05
- Dec 2015 - Apr 2017: Floating exchange rate against the US$
- May 2017 onwards: US$1 = ₼1.7 (fixed)

Current AZN exchange rates
| From Google Finance: | AUD CAD CHF CNY EUR GBP HKD JPY USD RUB TRY GEL |
| From Yahoo! Finance: | AUD CAD CHF CNY EUR GBP HKD JPY USD RUB TRY GEL |
| From XE.com: | AUD CAD CHF CNY EUR GBP HKD JPY USD RUB TRY GEL |
| From OANDA: | AUD CAD CHF CNY EUR GBP HKD JPY USD RUB TRY GEL |

== See also ==
- Central Bank of Azerbaijan
- Turkmenistani manat
- Economy of Azerbaijan
- Banking in Azerbaijan
