= Wedding Palace (Ashgabat) =

Civil registry building in Ashgabat, Turkmenistan

Coordinates: 37°55′35.4″N 58°20′28.6″E

- Bagt köşgi Багт көшги
- Interactive map of Wedding Palace
- Location: Ashgabat, Turkmenistan
- Type: Palace

Construction
- Built: 2009–2011
- Opened: 2011

The Wedding Palace (Turkmen: Bagt köşgi; Багт көшги) is a civil registry building in Ashgabat, Turkmenistan. It was constructed by Turkish company Polimeks. It was built in 2011, commissioned by the Government of Turkmenistan.

== Description ==
The Wedding Palace from afar

The eleven-story building covers an area of over 38,000 square metres (410,000 sq ft). It is a three-tier structure, each side of which has the form of an eight-pointed star. A cube that towers over large columns forms its upper stage and incorporates a ball with a diameter of 32 meters—a symbolic planet Earth with the image of Turkmenistan. Four entrances to the building symbolize the four directions.

The interior of the palace is made in Turkmen style. The center has six rooms for registration of marriage. Three are wedding hall for events, two of which hold 500 people and one which holds 1000. On the ninth floor of the Palace—in the central part of the "ball"—is the Golden Hall for weddings, called "Shamchyrag".

The Palace hosts seven banquet rooms, 36 shops and two cafes, providing all the necessary items of wedding services, including dress shops, decorations, car rental, ethnic jewelry, photo studio, beauty salon and 22-room hotel. The third and fourth floors hold administrative offices and a library. Under the building is a closed parking lot for 300 cars.
