= Gapik =

Monetary unit of Azerbaijan

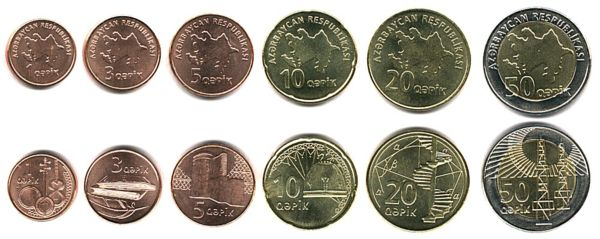
Azerbaijani gapik (qəpik) coins. Top row: obverse, bottom row: reverse.

The gapik (Azerbaijani: qəpik, pronounced [ɡæˈpik]) is a monetary unit of Azerbaijan, equal to 1/100 of the Azerbaijani manat. The 2006 redenomination of the manat introduced coins of 1, 3, 5, 10, 20, and 50 gapiks into circulation.

The 1, 3 and 5 gapik coins are made of copper-covered steel. The 10 and 20 gapik are of brass-covered steel, and the 50 gapik coin is bimetallic.

The word gapik (qəpik) is derived from the Russian word kopeck (копе́йка, from копьё, "spear"), which was a Russian coin since the time of Ivan the Terrible in the 16th century, and is now the monetary subunit of the Russian ruble, Ukrainian hryvnia, Belarusian ruble and the Transnistrian ruble.
