= Redenomination of the Azerbaijani manat =

2006 currency redenomination

The redenomination of the Azerbaijani manat was a reform of Azerbaijan's national currency, manat, when 1 new manat was equated to 5000 old manats. The redenomination was conducted in 2006 in accordance with the February 7, 2005 decree of Azerbaijani president Ilham Aliyev. Alongside banknotes of lower denomination, it re-introduced coins (qapiks) that had existed briefly in 1992–1993. Some banknotes retained their previous denominations, but their design was changed. The older banknotes officially ceased circulation after 1 January 2007, but they can be exchanged at the Central Bank of Azerbaijan and its branches indefinitely, without restrictions or fee.

== Decree ==
The redenomination was initiated by presidential decree No. 189 "On Changing the Nominal Value of Banknotes and the Scale of Prices (Denomination) in the Republic of Azerbaijan" dated 7 February 2005. The cited reasons for the redenomination were the high scale of prices and the low nominal rate of the manat, which "cause difficulties in compiling briefs and reports in the accounting system and statistics, conducting interdepartmental and banking settlements, [and] instill uncertainty in the national currency in the population, particularly the business people". However, after 1994, the manat exchange rate had stabilized and for many years the price of the US dollar fluctuated within 4000 old manats.

The decree on redenomination was published in the state newspaper Azerbaijan on 8 February 2005, issue 29.

== Redenomination ==
Comparison of old and new 1-manat banknotes

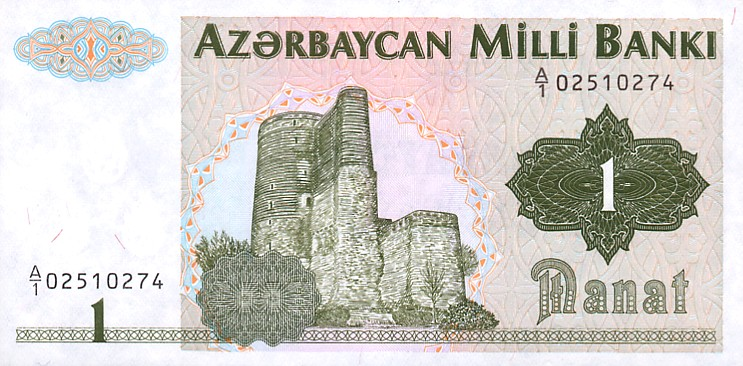
1991–1992

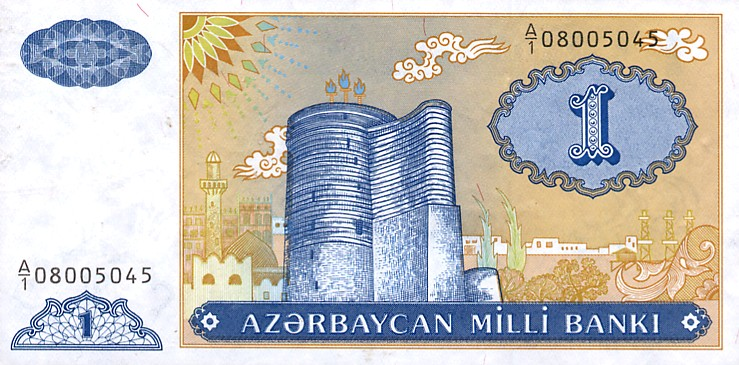
1992–2005

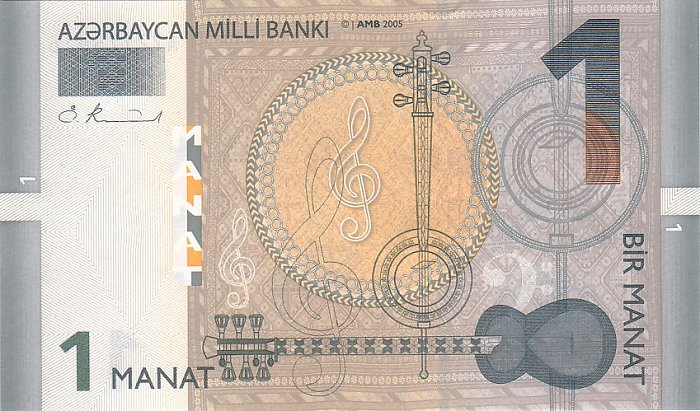
2005–2020

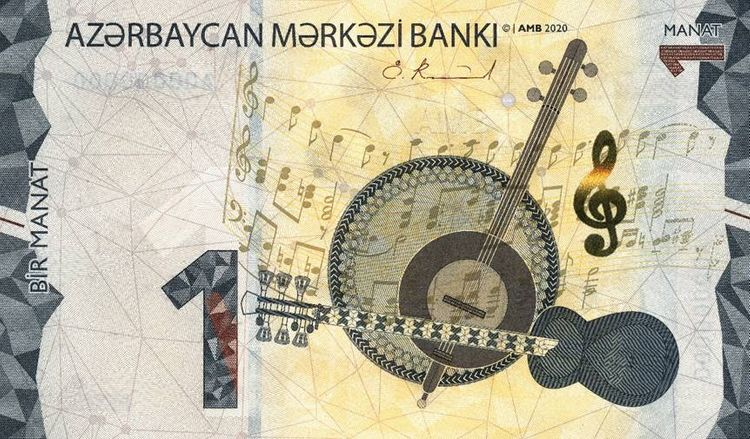
2020

During the redenomination, the banknotes with the face value of 250, 500, 1000, 10,000 and 50,000 manats were withdrawn and replaced by face values of 20 and, later in 2018, 200 manats. Banknotes with a face value of 1, 5, 10, 50 and 100 manats retained their denominations. The largest denomination became 200 manats (excluding commemorative banknote of 500 manats since 2021). The new banknotes received a four-tier protection against counterfeiting, where the first tier is determined by the general population without special equipment, and the fourth tier only by the Central Bank of Azerbaijan. At the same time, metal coins with face values of 1, 3, 5, 10, 20 and 50 qapiks were put into circulation. One new manat was equated to 100 qapiks.

Denominations withdrawn from circulation

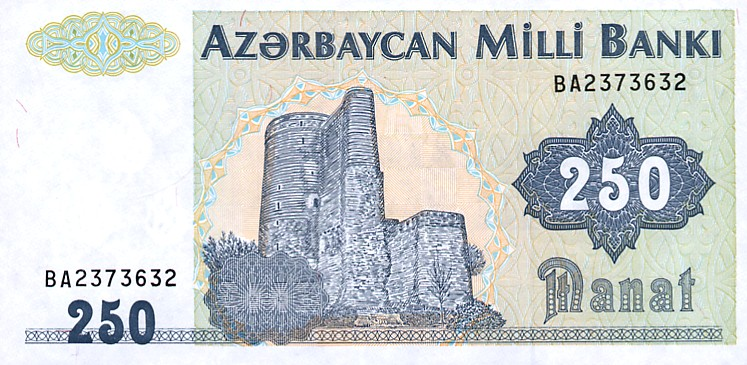
250 manats with Maiden Tower

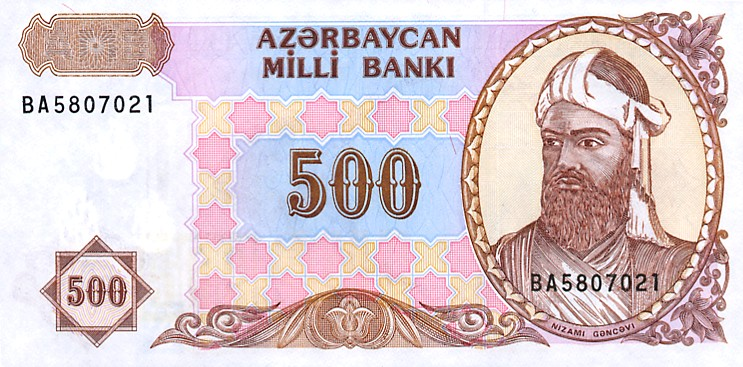
500 manats with Nizami Ganjavi

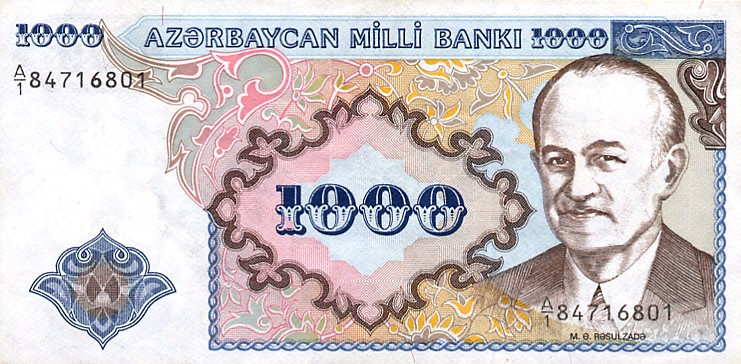
1000 manats with Mahammad Amin Rasulzade

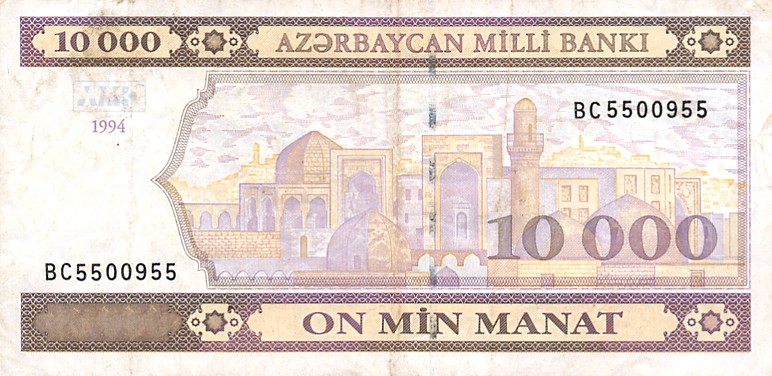
10,000 manats with the Palace of the Shirvanshahs

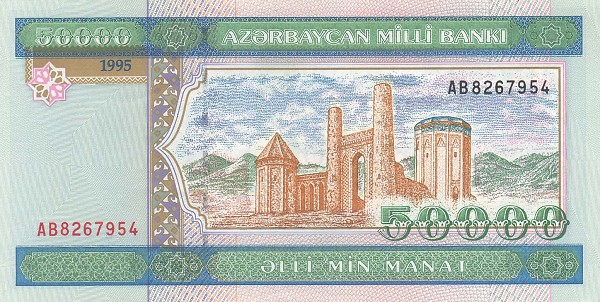
50,000 manats with Momine Khatun Mausoleum
Denominations entered into circulation

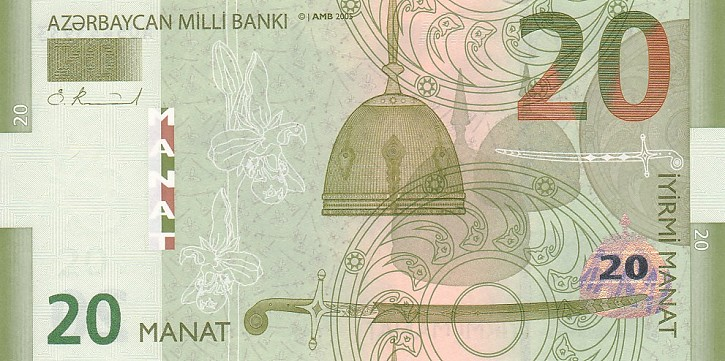
20 manats

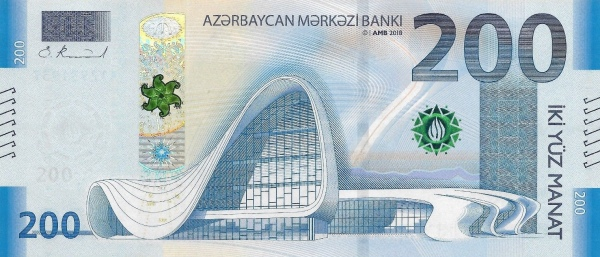
200 manats

All new banknotes were designed by Robert Kalina in patterns similar to the euro, without any portraits of famous people. In January 2006, the official symbol of the Azerbaijani Manat was introduced – ₼. The All-Russian Classifier of Currencies was updated, where the new Azerbaijani manat received the code 944 on 1 January 2006.

New banknotes entered circulation gradually. At first, only banknotes with a face value of one and five manats were issued. The redenomination produced some similarities with the prices of the Soviet era: a loaf of bread in 2005 began to cost 20 qapiks (previously 1000 manats), a fare in the Baku Metro – 5 qapiks (previously 250 manats), a kilogram of meat – 3 manats 60 qapiks (previously 18,000 manats).

== Reactions ==
Initially, the redenomination drew criticism from the population, although retail outlets in Azerbaijan were ordered to show prices in both old and new manats until the end of 2006. Cases of deception or unpreparedness were recorded. For example, in one local bus, the declared fare was "500 old manats or 20 qapiks", although 500 old manats corresponded to 10, not 20 qapiks. A similar case was noted in a post office when paying for electricity bill, where an employee, having received 20,000 old manats, issued a receipt for two, not four new manats, and the complaint was rejected.

Confusion was also caused by a government decree, according to which, when converting old manats to new ones, they should be rounded off without a fraction. As a result, the electricity company Barmek and water company Azersu raised billing prices due to conversion into new manats. After protests, both companies reinstated the old prices.

According to some government sources, the denomination was conducted hastily: "The issue […] has been discussed for about a month and a half, and the decision was made without consulting government experts. Before the reform, we have been arguing for two years that we should prepare for this more carefully, but they did not listen to us".
