= 20 manat =

20 manat - (Azerbaijani: İyirmi manat and Turkmen: ýigrimi manat) is one of the banknotes in Azerbaijan and Turkmenistan.

== Features of banknotes ==
Countries	Image		Dimensions	Main Color	Description		Date of issue
Countries	Obverse	Reverse	Dimensions	Main Color	Obverse	Reverse	Date of issue
(Turkmenistan)			138×69	Green	Portrait of Saparmurat Niyazov, building of National Library	Mausoleum Astana-Baba	1993
(Turkmenistan)			138×69	Green	Portrait of Saparmurat Niyazov, building of National Library	Mausoleum Astana-Baba	1995

== Banknotes in circulation ==
Countries	Image		Dimensions	Main Color	Description		Date of issue
Countries	Obverse	Reverse	Dimensions	Main Color	Obverse	Reverse	Date of issue
(Azerbaijan)			141×70	Green	Sword, Combat helmet, Shield, Khari-bulbul	Map of Azerbaijan against the background of national ornament, the word "Qarabağ" ("Karabakh") in different fonts	2005
(Turkmenistan)			138×69	Violet (color)	Tagta	Ruhyýet Palace	2009
(Turkmenistan)			138×69	Violet (color)	Tagta	Ruhyýet Palace	2012

== See also ==
- Azerbaijani manat
- Turkmenistani manat
