= Central Bank of Turkmenistan =

Turkmen national bank

Coordinates: 37°55′56″N 58°22′29″E

Central Bank of Turkmenistan Türkmenistanyň merkezi banky
- Headquarters: Bitarap Turkmenistan avenue 36, Ashgabat, Turkmenistan
- Established: 1991
- Ownership: 100% state ownership
- Governor: Toyly Owezgulyyevich Malikow
- Central bank of: Turkmenistan
- Currency: Turkmen manat TMT (ISO 4217)
- Website: https://www.cbt.tm

The Central Bank of Turkmenistan (Turkmen: Türkmenistanyň merkezi banky) is the national bank of Turkmenistan. It is located in the centre of Ashgabat. It was established in 1991 and regulates the country's banking system and supervises the national financial policy.

It is located in a distinctive high rise building.

== Board ==
The Board of the Central Bank of Turkmenistan consists of an odd number of people. This includes the Governor, who is the Chairman of the Board, and several Vice-Chairmen. Gadyrgeldi Müşşikow has been the Governor since 9 July 2021.

=== Chairmen ===
- Amandurdy Bordzhakov, 1991–June 1992
- Nazar Saparov, June 1992–June 1993
- Hudajberdy Orazov, June 1993–May 1999
- Seitbay Gandimov, May 1999–May 2002
- Imamdurdi Gandimov, May 2002–September 2002
- Nurberdi Bayramov, September 2002
- Shekersoltan Mukhammedova, September 2002–May 2005
- Jumaniyaz Annaorazov, May 2005–May 2006
- Geldimyrat Abylov, May 2006–April 2008
- Guvanchmyrat Goklenov, April 2008–July 2011
- Tuvakmamed Japarov, July 2011–January 2014
- Gochmyrad Myradov, January 2014–January 2015
- Merdan Annadurdiyev, January 2015–February 2020
- Gadyrgeldi Müşşikow, February 2020–April 2022
- Toyly Owezgulyyevich Malikov, April 2022–current

== Turkmen Horse Day ==
In 2013, the Central Bank of Turkmenistan has issued a new collection of commemorative coins in honor of the Turkmen Horse Day. The gold and silver coins, called "Akhalteke horse of the Turkmen", have a value of US$18. Ancient Akhal-Teke horses, known as "horses from heaven", are part of the national heritage of Turkmenistan, which is considered an international center of horse grooming.

== See also ==
- List of central banks
