= Day of Neutrality =

State holiday in Turkmenistan

Day of Neutrality Turkmen: Bitaraplyk baýramy
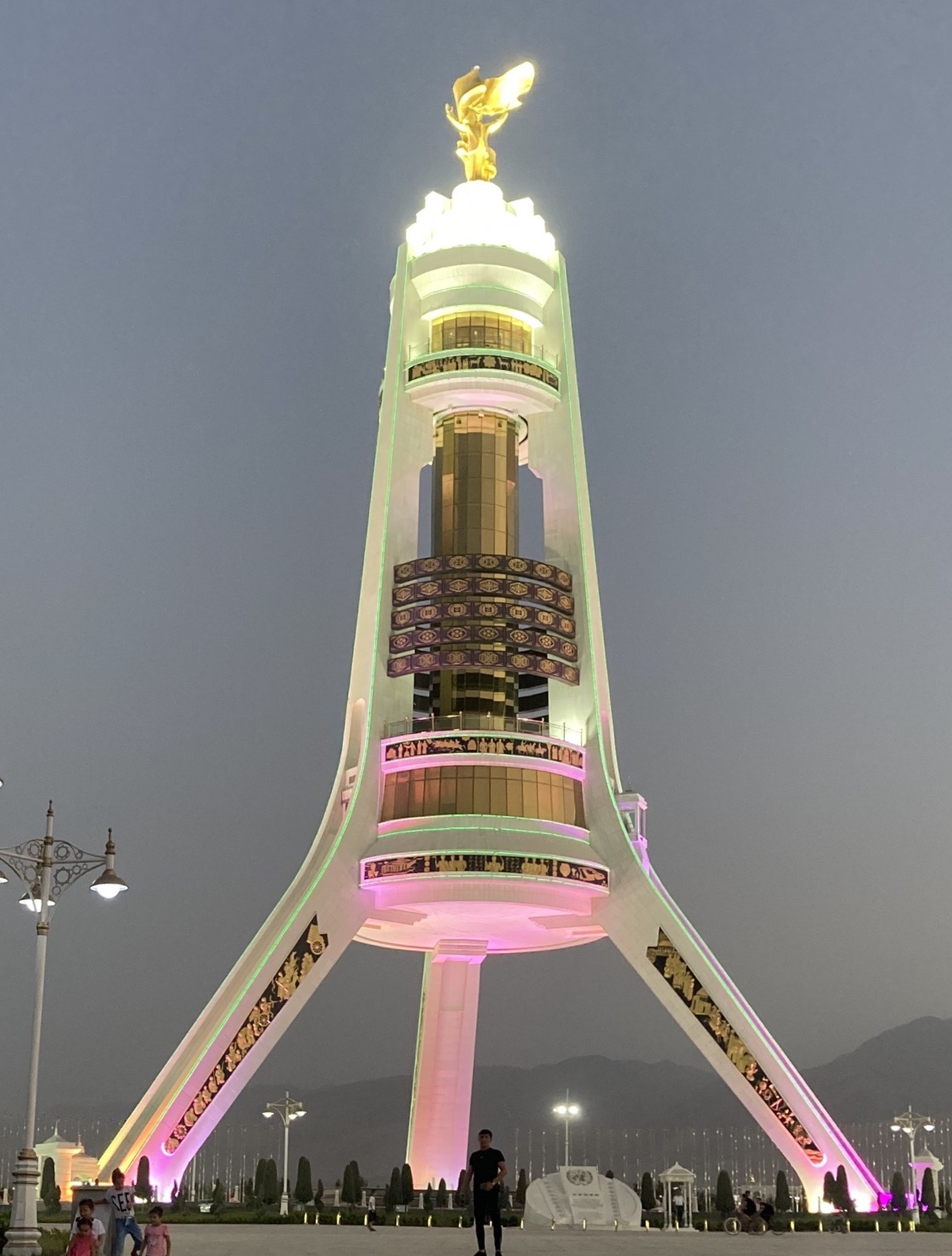
- Neutrality Monument
- Observed by: Turkmenistan
- Type: State
- Significance: The day the adoption of UN General Assembly Resolution №50/80
- Celebrations: Fireworks, Concerts
- Date: December 12
- Next time: 12 December 2026
- Frequency: annual

Neutrality Day of Turkmenistan (Turkmen: Bitaraplyk baýramy) is the second most important state holiday in Turkmenistan. This date is celebrated in Turkmenistan annually on December 12. It coincides with the International Day of Neutrality as well as Students Day (since 2003), which is marked together with Neutrality Day. It has been dubbed as Turkmenistan's "second significant national holiday".

== Background ==
UN General Assembly Resolution number 50/80 was adopted on December 12, 1995, which expressed the hope that "the status of permanent neutrality of Turkmenistan will contribute to peace and security in the region." The resolution calls on UN to respect and maintain the neutrality of Turkmenistan.

== Festivities ==
In Neutrality Day across the Central Asian republic are mass festivities and holiday concerts. Ashgabat hosts international conference. In 2005, on the holiday's 10th anniversary, a parade of the Armed Forces of Turkmenistan led by Colonel Kairam Bairamov was held in the Ashgabat Stadium. In 2012, the country for the first time had all events on this date pushed back to previous days.

=== 25th anniversary of neutrality celebrations ===
2020 celebrated the 25th anniversary of Turkmen neutrality. President Gurbanguly Berdimuhamedow received congratulations from Russian president Vladimir Putin, Chinese leader Xi Jinping and Belarusian president Alexander Lukashenko on the occasion. The president presented Turkmen medals to 20 foreign dignitaries including former United Nations Secretary General Ban Ki-moon, Russian ambassador to Turkmenistan Alexander Blokhin, and former Japanese prime minister Shinzo Abe. The celebrations came under the motto "Turkmenistan - Homeland of Neutrality". An international exhibition beginning on 2 December and ending on Neutrality Day was held at the Expo Centre of the Chamber of Commerce and Industry of Turkmenistan. A Turkmen-funded mosque for 500 people was inaugurated in the Faryab Province of Afghanistan on Neutrality Day.

== See also ==
- Neutrality Monument
