= Polimeks =

Turkish construction company mainly active in Turkmenistan

Polimeks İnşaat ve Sanayi A.Ş.
- Company type: Public
- Industry: Construction
- Founded: 1995
- Headquarters: Istanbul, Turkey
- Key people: Erol Tabanca
- Website: polimeks.com

Polimeks İnşaat ve Sanayi A.Ş. is a Turkish holding company based in Istanbul. Polimeks, established in 1995 and grew to become one of the world's leading construction companies, in recent years transformed into a global investment holding with activities in tourism, real estate, and renewable energy sectors. Polimeks primarily operates in Turkey, Russia, United Kingdom, Turkmenistan and the Netherlands.

== History ==
In January 2013, the company received a contract to build the Ashgabat International Airport. Costing $2.1 billion in labor and operations, this is the largest construction project a Turkish firm has done abroad. This was preceded by the Ashgabat Wedding Palace in 2011.

In 2007 in Moscow, the company built the first Ritz-Carlton hotel in Russia, on the site of the demolished high-rise hotel Intourist, on Tverskaya Street. In Turkey, the company built a hotel in Eskişehir and a paper mill in Kazakhstan.

According to the American magazine Engineering News-Record, Polimeks occupied 62nd place in the 2015 ranking of "225 Largest International Contractors".

== See also ==
- Turkish construction and contracting industry
