= Inspiration Park =

Public park in downtown Ashgabat, Turkmenistan

Coordinates: 37°56′39″N 58°22′38″E

- Interactive map of Inspiration Park
- Type: Urban park
- Location: Ashgabat, Turkmenistan
- Created: 2010
- Status: Open all year

Inspiration Park (Turkmen: Ylham seýilgähi) is a public park in downtown Ashgabat, Turkmenistan. The park opened in 2010. It is located between two major thoroughfares in Ashgabat, Görogly and Magtymguly, and covers an area of 57,000 m^{2}. Against the backdrop of mature trees along an artificial waterfall, there are new seedlings planted, flower beds and flower pots. Two cafés serve the park.

== Monuments ==
The paths in the park are lined with sculptures depicting prominent Turkmen and Muslim poets, thinkers and scholars of antiquity and modernity. Photographs of the sculptures can be seen on the Mapillary website.

Among them are Abu Bakr bin Yahya al-Suli, Abū-Sa'īd Abul-Khayr, Al-Zamakhshari, Mahmud al-Kashgari, Al-Farabi, Avicenna, Abū Rayḥān al-Bīrūnī, Sarakhsi and Jahan Shah. Original works are dedicated to Muhammad ibn Musa al-Khwarizmi, Shemseddin Mervezi, Mahmyt Pälwan, Najm al-Din Kubra and Kadi Burhan al-Din.

The middle section of the park is devoted to extraordinary poets of the 11th through 19th centuries. Among them are Hoja Ahmet Yasawi, Yunus Emre, Döwletmämmet Azady, Gurbandurdy Zelili, Seýitnazar Seýdi, Mämmetweli Kemine, Yūsuf Balasaguni, Imadaddin Nasimi, Fuzuli, Alisher Navoi, Omar Khayyám, Nurmuhammet Andalyp, Mollanepes, Anagylyç Mätäji, Abdul Rahim Khan-i-Khanan and Baýram Han.

In the alley, dedicated to outstanding personalities in the history of Turkmenistan, are busts of Berdi Kerbabayev, Aman Kekilov, Beki Seytakov, Kara Seytliev, Kerim Kurbannepesov, Ata Gowshudow, Nurmyrat Saryhanow, Gurbannazar Ezizow and others.
