= Turkmen literature =

Turkmen literature (Turkmen: Türkmen edebiýaty) comprises oral compositions and written texts in the Old Oghuz Turkic and Turkmen languages. The Turkmens are direct descendants of the Oghuz Turks, who were a western Turkic people, who formed the Oghuz branch of the Turkic language family.

The history of the common Turkic literature spans a period of nearly 1,300 years. The oldest records of written Turkic are found on runic inscriptions, of which the best known are the Orhon inscriptions dating from the seventh century. Later, between the 9th and 11th centuries, a tradition of oral epics, such as the Book of Dede Korkut of the Oghuz Turks—the linguistic and cultural ancestors of the modern Turkish, Turkmen and Azerbaijani peoples—and the Manas Epic of the Kyrgyz people arose among the nomadic Turkic peoples of Central Asia.

Following the Battle of Manzikert, the Turkmen language spread into Anatolia through the migration of the Oghuz Turks, laying the foundation for the development of a written literary tradition in the region.

The earliest development of Turkmen literature is closely associated with the literature of the Oghuz Turks. Turkmens have joint claims to a number of literary works written in Old Oghuz and Persian (by Seljuks in the 11-12th centuries) languages with other people of the Oghuz Turkic origin, mainly of Azerbaijan and Turkey. These works include, among others, the Book of Dede Korkut, Epic of Koroghlu, "Layla and Majnun", and "Yusuf Zulaikha".

There is a consensus, however, that distinctively modern Turkmen literature originated in the 18th century with the poetry of Magtymguly Pyragy. He is considered the father of Turkmen literature. Other prominent Turkmen poets of that era are Döwletmämmet Azady (Magtymguly's father), Nurmuhammet Andalyp, Abdylla Şabende, Şeýdaýy, Mahmyt Gaýyby and Gurbanally Magrupy.

== History ==
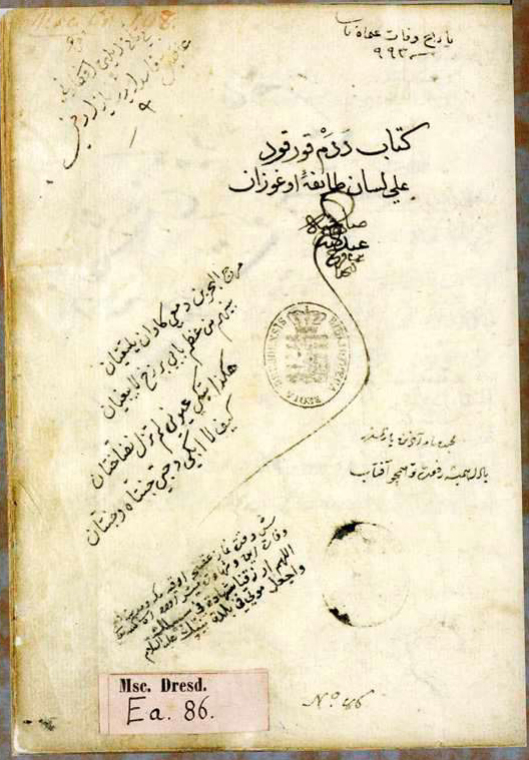
Dresden manuscript of the "Book of Dede Korkut"

Turkmen literature is closely related to the earliest Turkic literature commonly shared by all Turkic peoples. The earliest known examples of Turkic poetry date to sometime in the sixth century AD and were composed in the Uyghur language. Some of the earliest verses attributed to Uyghur Turkic writers are only available in Chinese language translations. During the era of oral poetry, the earliest Turkic verses were intended as songs and their recitation was part of the community's social life and entertainment.

Of the long epics, only the Oğuzname survived in its entirety. The Book of Dede Korkut may have had its origins in the poetry of the 10th century but remained an oral tradition until the 15th century. The earlier written works Kutadgu Bilig and Dīwān Lughāt al-Turk date to the second half of the 11th century and are some of the earliest known examples of Turkic literature.

One of the most important figures of Oghuz Turkic (Turkoman) literature was the 13th century Sufi poet Yunus Emre. The golden age of Turkoman literature is thought to have lasted from the 10th century until the 17th century.

== Emergence of the distinct Turkmen literature ==
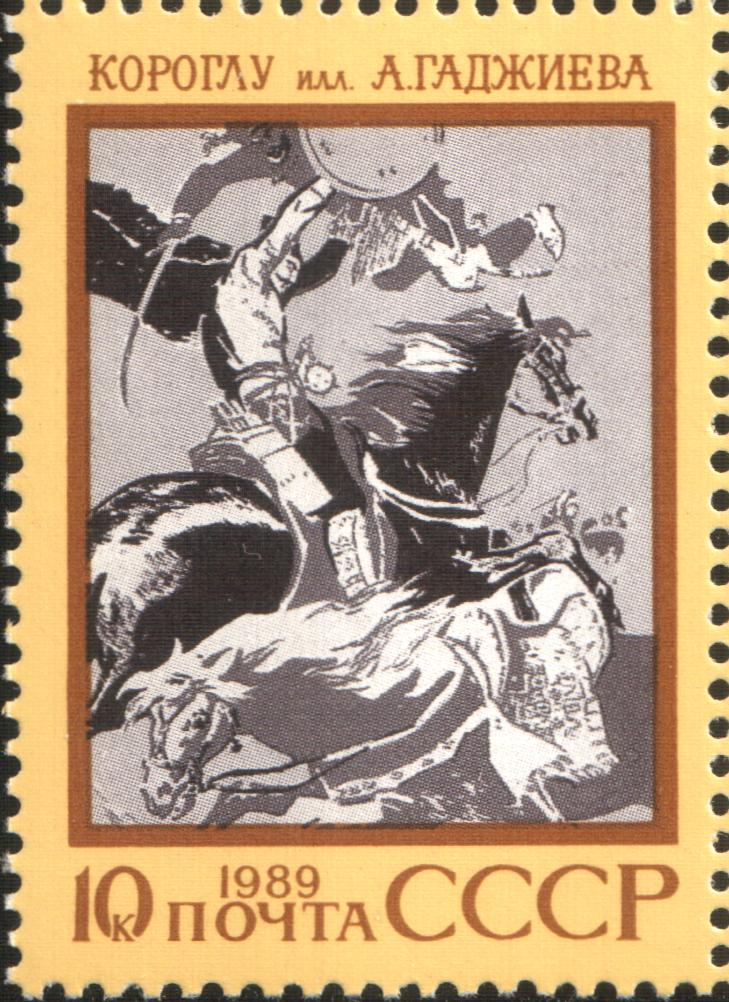
Gorogly by A. Hajiyev

The first use of a near-modern Turkmen language in written literature dates to between the 15th and 16th centuries. Modern Turkmen elements can be seen in the works written in the Chagatai language in common Turkic literature. The influence of the Chagatai language on Turkmen literature remained significant even later. The most ancient instances of distinct Turkmen literature are the religious and moral compositions of the Khorosani Turkmen, Vafayi, called Rownak-ul-Islam (The Light of Islam), (1464), written in poetic form; the verses of Bairam Khan (16th century), the work of Abu al-Ghazi Bahadur, Genealogy of the Turkmens (17th century).

An analysis of the language and content of the anonymous novels recorded in the 19th century - Asly Kerem, Şasenem we Garyp, Görogly, Hürlukga we Hemra, Melike Dilaram, Ibrahim and Edehem, Zeýnal-Arap, Baba Röwşen, etc., show that they were originally written between the 15th and 17th centuries, and were composed according to the so-called "wandering plots" known throughout the East. They glorified the triumph of love, bravery and courage of heroes who overcome obstacles and fight against the forces of evil, personified by fantastic creatures - devs, jinn, peri, etc. These creatures help the heroes solve difficult problems in the novels of Hürlukga we Hemra, Saýatly Hemra, Görogly, and Şasenem we Garyp. The novels of Baba Röwşen, Melike Dilaram and others are about the struggle of the representatives of Islam, Ali and his followers - against the "infidels". The peculiarity of the literary form of these novels is the alternation of prose and poetic passages.

The surviving oral Turkmen folklore - fairy tales, songs, anecdotes, proverbs, sayings, tongue twisters, etc. - along with the heroes of noble origin, are characters from the common people - Aldar Köse, Kelje, Dälije, Aklamyh gyzlary, Gara atly gyz, and others. They emerge victorious in difficult situations thanks to their diligence, dexterity, resourcefulness, and courage. An integral part of the literary process in Turkmenistan has always been the folk poet-improviser or shahir (şahyr), usually illiterate.

== Golden age ==
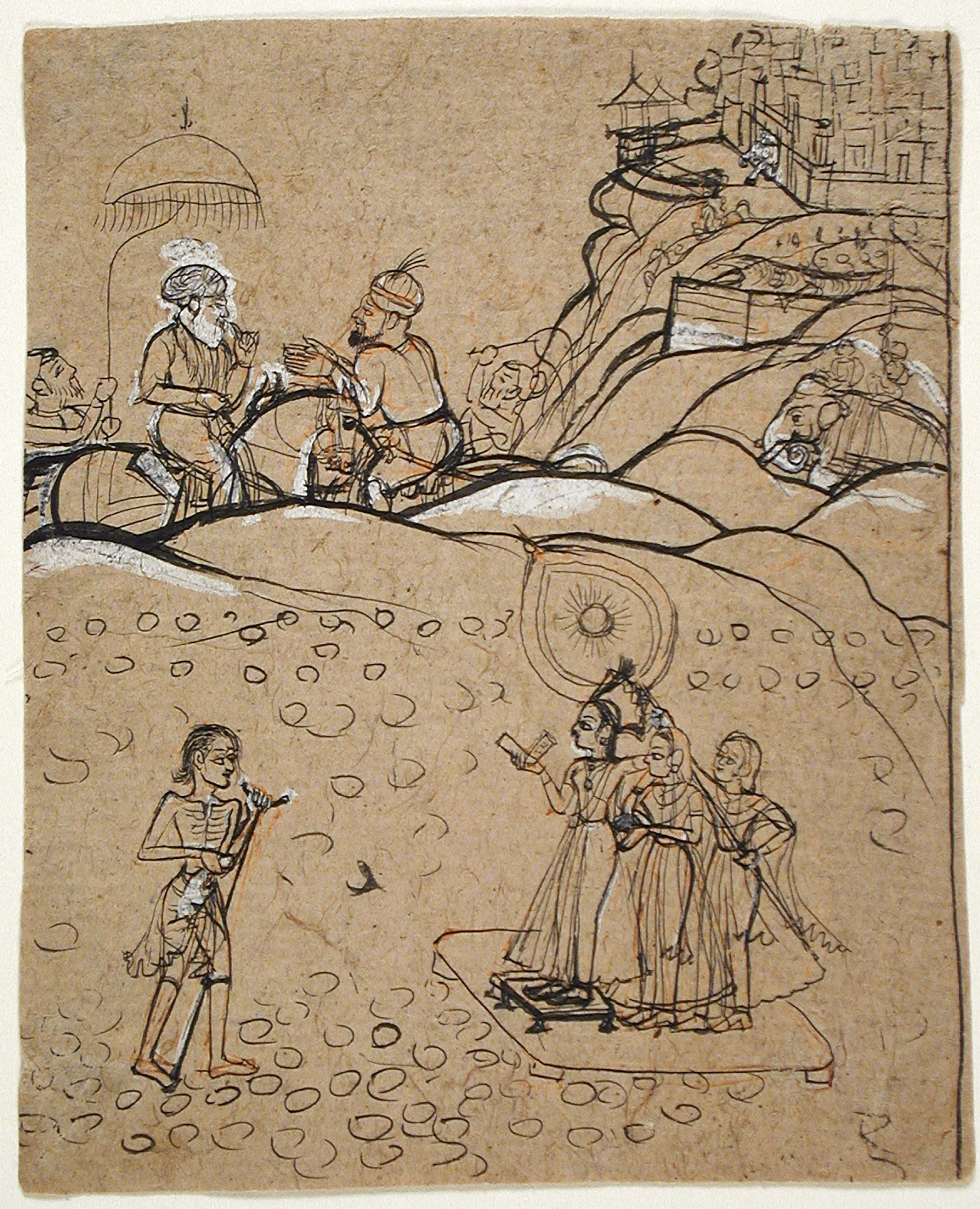
Illustration for the story of "Laila and Majnun"

The 18th and 19th centuries are considered the era when Turkmen poetry flourished, marked by the appearance of poets including Azady, Andalyp, Pyragy, Şeýdaýy, Zelili, and Gaýyby.

Döwletmämmet Azady is known for his religious and didactic treatise Wagzy Azat (Sermon of Azad), written in the form of individual poems and short tales, as well as the poem "Jabyr Ensar" and lyric poems. The poet Andalyp, who lived at the same time, is the author of lyric works and novels such as Yusup and Zulaikha, Laila and Majnun, and Sagd-Vekas. The language of the poetry of Azady and Andalyp is far from the folk language and is oriented towards the canons of oriental court poetry.

=== Magtymguly Pyragy ===
Magtymguly Pyragy, the widely educated poet and philosopher and son of Azady, represented a turning point for Turkmen literature expanding the theme of literary works, addressing the national language and the entire nation. It is widely believed that he wrote nearly 800 poems, although many may be apocryphal. Most of them are constructed as goshgy (folk songs), while other poems are composed as personal ghazals that include Sufi elements. In the 19th century, Makhtumguly's poems spread across Central Asia orally rather than in written form, enabling them to achieve wide popularity among many other people, including Karakalpaks, Tajiks and Kurds.

In his poems, of which over 300 have survived, references to almost all countries, sciences, and literary sources known in his time can be found. He crossed clan and tribal boundaries, and through his works expressed the aspiration of all Turkmens to unite. He used the vernacular language—many of his poetic lines turned into folk proverbs and sayings. The bold disclosure of the contradictions of the era, the deep sincerity, the highly artistic significance of the poetry of Magtymguly made his works a model for others and were imitated later by the best representatives of Turkmen literature.

Magtymguly's collected works are regarded by many Turkmens as a pinnacle of Turkmen literature and are often found in the homes of people in the Turkmen-speaking world, who learn his poems by heart and still use them as proverbs and sayings. His life and poems have become the subjects of much analysis, commentary and interpretation.

The following is an excerpt from Magtymguly's Aýryldym (Separated) poem dedicated to Meňli, a girl he loved in his youth (in original Turkmen and its English translation):

Aýryldym gunça gülümden.
Syýa saçly sünbülimden,
Hoş owazly bilbilimden,
Şirin güftardan aýryldym.

Illeri bar diňli-diňli,
Sowuk suwly, ter öleňli,
Ili — gökleň, ady — Meňli,
Näzli dildardan aýryldym.

Magtymguly, aşyk mestan,
Bagladym şanyna destan,
Menzilgähi bagy-bostan.
Almaly nardan aýryldym.

I am separated from my flower.
From my black hair beauty,
From my nice voice nightingale,
I am separated from my sweet talking love.

She has lands with minarets,
With cold waters and meadows,
She comes from Gokleng, her name is Mengli,
I am separated from my tender lover.

Magtymguly, drunk with love,
I have composed a dastan for you,
The place she lives is full of gardens.
I am separated from my apple pomegranate.

=== Şeýdaýy, Magrupy and others ===
At the end of the 18th century, while maintaining the influence of the Chagatai language, the convergence of written Turkmen with the spoken language began. Creative poetry of the late 18th and early 19th centuries was represented by such names as Şeýdaýy (a fantasy novel Gül we Senuwer, and lyric poems) and Gaýyby with a collection of 400 poems. The novelist Magrupy is the author of the heroic novel Ýusup we Ahmet and the love story "Seýfel Melek".

The following is an excerpt from Magrupy's Ýusup we Ahmet (in original Turkmen and its English translation):

Ahmet beg diýer, meni göze almadyň,
Öwüt edip, belli jogap bermediň,
Özüň bildiň meni adam bilmediň,
Ak patany bergin, Ýusup soltanym

Ýusup beg diýer, bildim, arslan ekeniň,
Jahany titreden pälwan ekeniň,
Boýny ýogyn, gödek oglan ekeniň,
Barabarda ýörgün, Ahmet mürzeýim!

Ahmet bey says, you have not understood me,
You gave advice, but have not given a clear answer,
You thought of yourself neglecting me,
Give me your blessing, my king Yusup

Yusup bey says, I see that you are a lion,
You are hero who shakes the world,
Your are a brave man of mighty stature,
Be virtous, my prince Ahmet!

=== Early 19th century ===
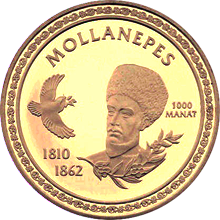
Poet Mollanepes on the commemorative coin of Turkmenistan

The early 19th century is marked by the appearance of a significant number of poets and prose writers writing in the Turkmen language. This includes Şabende, the author of lyric poems and science fiction novels and stories; and works by Şabehrem, Hojaýy Berdi Han, and Nejep Oglan, who praised bravery, selflessness, and heroism in the fight against enemies. The poet Mollanepes is the author of the novel Zöhre we Tahyr, which exposes the treachery of the shahs and courtiers, glorifies the triumph of truth and love. Poems like "Gül we Bilbil" (The Rose and the Nightingale), by Şabende, refers to the masterpieces of Turkmen literature. The poetry of Mollanepes is distinguished by the brightness and power of images, and a rich language.

In the works of poets of the first half of the 19th century, such as Seýdi, Zelili, and Kemine, themes are dominated by social motives. The poet-warrior Seýdi (1758–1830) fought against the Emirate of Bukhara and called on the Turkmen tribes to unite and fight for freedom. Zelili (1790–1844) described the suffering of the Etrek Turkmens, oppressed by the baýs (rich people), mullahs, the Khanate of Khiva, and Iranian rulers. He praised earthly joys and exposed the bribery and cruelty of the ruling classes. The singer, Mämmetweli Kemine (died in 1840), wrote about love of free choice, his native region, and composed numerous funny short tales or anecdotes.

In the middle of the 19th century, poets Dosmämmet, Aşyky, Allazy, Zynhary, Ýusup Hoja, Baýly, Allaguly, and Garaoglan were widely known; however, only a few of their poems have survived. In the 1860s, Abdysetdar Kazy composed the famous historical poem, "Jeňnama", about the battles of the Teke (Turkmens) against the Iranians.

== Literature during the Russian Turkestan era ==
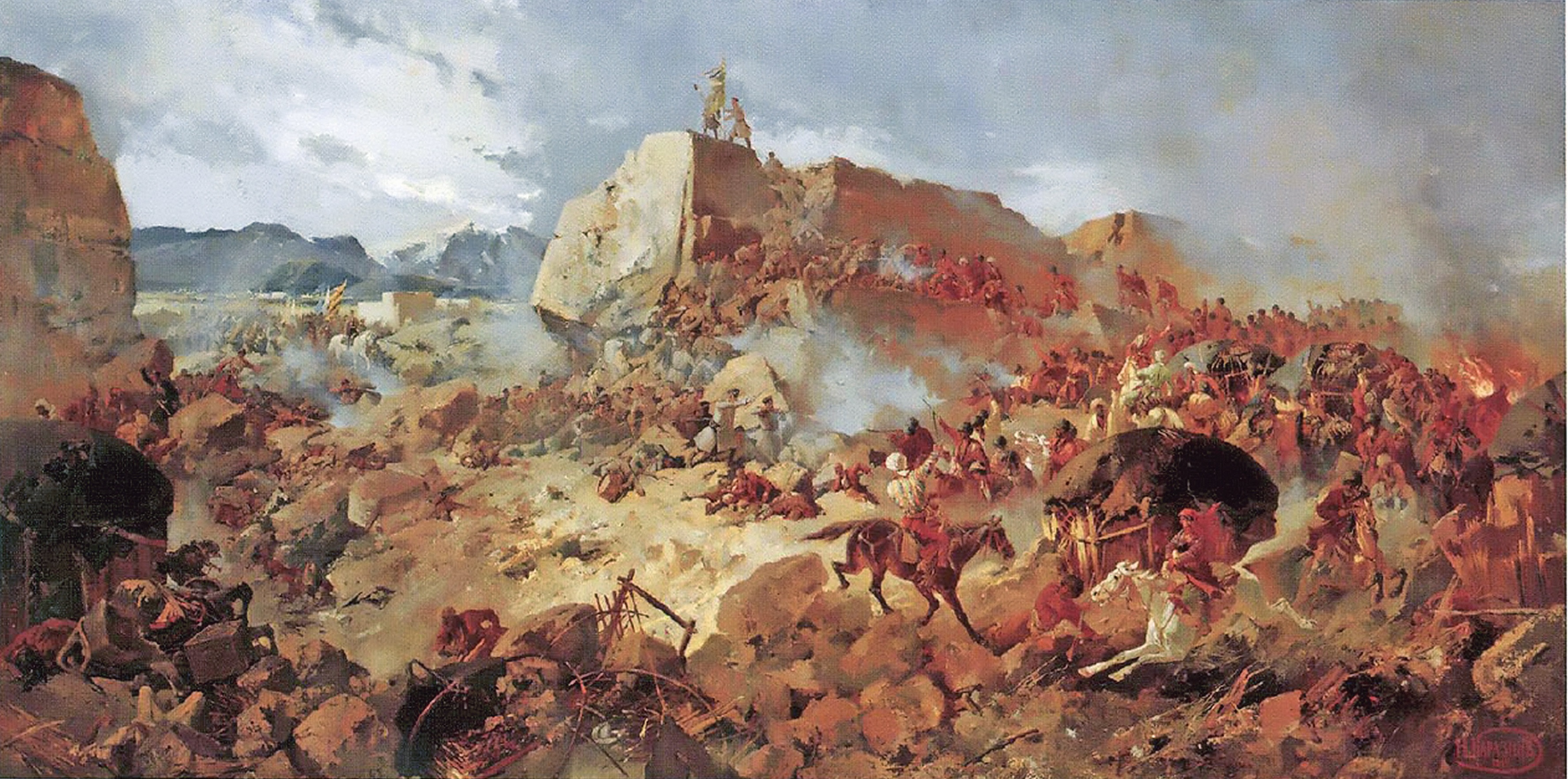
Siege of Geok Tepe

In the 1880s, Turkestan was conquered by the Russians, and the poets Mätäji (1824–1884) and Misgin Gylyç (1845–1905) wrote about the heroic defense of Gokdepe fortress, the last stronghold of the Turkmens who fought against the Tsarist army. They also wrote social and love lyrics.

In the 19th century, the first printed books appeared in the Turkmen language. In the pre-revolutionary schools of Turkestan, an artificial "Central Asian-Chagatai" language was taught, but most of the population was illiterate. The modern Turkmen language began to form at the beginning of the 20th century, based on the Teke dialect of the Turkmen language. In 1913, the first Russian-Turkmen dictionary was published under the editorship of I.A. Belyaev. The Grammar of the Turkmen Language was also published under his editorship in 1915.

== Soviet influence ==
=== Early years after the October Revolution ===
The early 20th century was marked by the emergence of new topics in Turkmen literature—criticism of the ignorance of the Muslim clergy, remnants of the old way of life, propaganda of ideas of enlightenment. These themes are present in the works of the writers Molla Durdy, Biçäre Mohammet Gylyç (died 1922), and others. The Soviet period of Turkmen literature manifested itself in new themes in the works of the shahirs and the first Soviet Turkmen writers and poets. This process was accompanied by overcoming the ideological heritage of Jadidism, and understanding new Soviet images, ideas, and realities.

The first songs about the October Revolution, Lenin and Stalin, and the struggle of the Red Army were composed by the shahirs Bayram and Kermolla. Poets Durdy Gylych (b. 1886) and Ata Salyh (b. 1908) significantly expanded the theme of their songs. They composed songs about the successes of socialist construction and the victories of the world proletariat, the Stalinist constitution and friendship of the peoples of the USSR, collective farm construction, liberated women, hero pilots, defeating enemies. These themes became the basis for the creativity of many famous shahirs of the Soviet period including Halla, Töre, and Oraz Çolak. The Soviet government awarded many of them orders and medals.

In the 20th century, the question was raised several times about the translation of the Turkmen script, which previously existed based on the Arabic alphabet, into other types of alphabets. After the congress of Turkologists in Baku in 1926, the Turkmen script was translated into the Latin alphabet and existed in this form until 1940, when, as in all the Turkic republics of the USSR, the writing was translated into Cyrillic with the addition of some additional letters. In 1993, Turkmenistan again returned to the Latin alphabet, however, Turkmens outside Turkmenistan continue to use the Arabic alphabet.

The first Soviet Turkmen poet, Molla Murt (1879–1930), from the first days of the socialist revolution, glorified socialism in his poems in a simple and understandable language for the people. The first Soviet prose writer Agahan Durdiyev (b. 1904), in his works "In the Sea of Dreams", "Wave of Shock Workers", "Meret", "Gurban", "Beauty in the Claws of the Golden Eagle", wrote about the construction in the Garagum desert, about the problems facing the liberation of the women of the East, etc.

The romance of socialist construction was reflected in the works of other Turkmen writers including Durdy Agamammedov (b. 1904) and his poems and plays about "The collective farm life of Sona", the collective farm system, "the Son of October"; Beki Seytakov (b. 1914) and his humorous poems, "Stories by Akjagul", "Communar", and his poem "On Fire"; Alty Garliyev and his plays Cotton, Annagul, Ayna 1916; the first Turkmen woman, playwright and poet Towshan Esenova (b. 1915) and her comedy from the collective farm life The daughter of a Millionaire, and the poems "Steel Girls", "Lina".

=== Berdi Kerbabayev ===
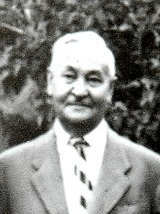
Soviet Turkmen writer, Berdy Kerbabayev

The most prominent figure among the Soviet Turkmen writers is Berdi Kerbabayev, Academician of the Academy of Sciences of the Turkmen SSR, Hero of the Socialist Labour (b. 1894). In the 1920s, he began to publish as a poet-satirist. In the poems "Maiden's World" (1927) and "Fortified, or The Victim of Adat" (1928), he advocated the establishment of Soviet moral norms and deliverance from the remnants of the past. For the first Turkmen revolutionary historical novel The Decisive Step (1947), he was awarded the title of laureate of the USSR State Prize (1948). During the Great Patriotic War, the story "Gurban Durdy" (1942), the poem "Aylar" (1943), and the plays Brothers (1943) and Magtymguly (1943) were written. From 1942 to 1950, he was the chairman of the Writers' Union of Turkmenistan. After the war, Kerbabayev's works about the life of a collective farm village were published—the story "Aysoltan From the Country of White Gold" (1949, USSR State Prize 1951), about the life of oil workers; the novel Nebit-Dag (1957); and the historical novel Miraculously Born (1965) about the Turkmen revolutionary K. Atabayev. Kerbabayev was also involved in translating the works of Russian and Soviet poets and writers into Turkmen.

There are many more poets and writers whose literary creativity was revealed during the years of the USSR: Kemal Ishanov, Saryhanov, Ata Govshudov, Meret Gylyjov, Pomma-Nur Berdiyev, Chary Guliyev, Monton Janmyradov, Ahmet Ahundov-Gurgenli, Seyidov, Hemrayev and others. In general, Turkmen literature of the 1920-1990 period developed within the framework of Soviet culture, mastering the images of socialist realism, adjusted for Turkmen specificity.

The undoubted achievements of the Soviet period include the significant research work carried out by Soviet historians and linguists, who discovered the sources of the oldest literary works in the Turkmen language of the 15th to 16th centuries.

== After Independence ==
In the 1990s, after the proclamation of independence of Turkmenistan, Turkmen literature began reflecting new trends. However, it is impossible to illuminate fully the state and the ways modern Turkmen literature developed and talk about the work of the poets and prose writers of the present. Each of them perceives reality in its own way, each has its own theme and style of presentation.

Agageldi Allanazarov's novel The Seal deals with the emotional experiences of the heroes, traditions and moral foundations of the Turkmen people. The work of Hudayberdi Diwanguliyev, Return to Yekagach, reveals the character of the heroes in difficult conditions, when they, using their deep knowledge and experience, get out of the most difficult situations with honor. It is optimistic and calls for the unification of people's efforts in solving the grandiose tasks of deep scientific knowledge of the world around them.

A distinctive feature of the prose of Komek Guliyev, whose story "Every Fairy Tale Has its Own End" is a peculiar manner of presentation with a soft, good-natured humor, a subtle knowledge of human psychology and a comprehensive disclosure of the characters of their heroes.

Poems and rubayis of Atamyrat Atabayev are permeated with a sensitive concern for the future of the country; they contain deep reflections on the relationship between people in new conditions, in an independent and neutral Turkmen land. They contain bright feelings of filial love for the Motherland, respect for her history and the glorious deeds of her ancestors.

There are countless contemporary poets and writers, such as Orazguly Annayev, Gurbanyaz Dashgynov, Gurbannazar Orazgulyyev and others, whose works are popular not only in Turkmenistan, but in the post-Soviet countries as well.

== See also ==
- Turkmen people
- Turkmen language
- Turkmen culture
- Magtymguly Pyragy
