= Music of Turkmenistan =

The music of contemporary nomadic and rural Turkmen people is closely related other Central Asian folk forms and is descended from Arab and Persian forms of the Middle Ages. Important musical traditions in Turkmen music include traveling singers and shamans called bagshy, who act as healers and magicians and sing either a cappella or accompanied by the dutar, a two-stringed lute. The Central Asian classical music tradition, mugam, is also present in Turkmenistan under the name mukamlar.

== Classical Turkmen folk music ==
According to Soviet musicologist Viktor Belyayev, Turkmen classical folk music is directly descended from Arabic music as taught and performed in Khorezm, particularly in Bukhara, which was the musical center of the Islamic world in the 13th century. The Turkic tribes of Central Asia, including the predecessors of today's Turkmen, abandoned their own culture in the 9th century and shifted to Arab culture, including music, with their adoption of Islam.The Arabic musical tradition at that time bore Greek influences on local music dating to the 4th-century conquest by Alexander the Great as well as some Christian influence from the pre-Islamic period. Belyayev notes later influences of Azerbaijani and Afghan music as well. A terracotta figurine from ancient Merv dating to the 2nd through 4th centuries CE portrays a wandering minstrel bearing an instrument resembling the dutar.

Belyayev also remarked that it is difficult to separate Arab from Persian influence, noting that kidnapped Persian brides were doubtless a source of Persian influence on Turkmen folk music, given the prevalence of certain Persian melodic influences, including the existence of the augmented second in Turkmen music and use of three Persian musical modes.

Gullyyev and Rejepova assert that the epic poem Gorkut Ata reveals the names of early medieval instruments, the gopuz, surnaý, bory, and nagara, but concede that information on Turkmen musical culture of the 9th through 15th centuries is virtually nonexistent. Musician and musicologist Mamed Guseynov, however, notes,

...information on musical instruments contained in the works of al-Farabi, al-Kindi, Ibn Sina, Safi al-Din and al-Urmavi (IX-XIII centuries) [allows reconstruction of] the appearance of more than seventy musical instruments that were widely popular among Turkmens at different times. By the beginning of the XX century, only a few instruments, the most compact and convenient for transportation during migrations, were in demand. These are dutar, gyjak, varieties of tuiduk and gopuz.

Belyayev asserted that Turkmen love of music is rooted in the lack of other entertainment options while pursuing a nomadic lifestyle in the broad steppes.

=== Style ===
Turkmen classical folk music is vocal, the chanting of poems while the singer (Turkmen: bagşy) accompanies himself on a dutar. Poetry is not simply read; it is sung or chanted to music. Belyayev described it as "halfway between declamation and singing." All traditional music thus features lyrics, which in reality are highly structured poems. Belyayev and Uspenskiy identified six major themes of Turkmen folk songs:

- religion,
- disillusionment with life (the dominant theme),
- military, criminal, or hunting subjects,
- love,
- curative (not lacking in shamanist undertones),
- history.

They noted that humorous songs also exist but that "bagşy generally do not sing them."

The Soviet Turkmen Academy of Sciences classified folk music as follows:

- halk aýdymlary (folk songs),
- läle (maidens' songs),
- monjugatdy (fortune-telling songs),
- hüwe (lullabies),
- ýaremazan (caroling),
- oleň (wedding songs),
- agy (mourning songs).

More recently, Turkmen composer and musicologist Suhan Tuýlyýew has reclassified folk music somewhat differently, in two broad categories:
folklore, which includes

- hüwdi (lullabies),
- work songs sung by women while milking livestock (höwlüm) or milling grain (höküdük),
- ritual songs, including monjugatdy, religious songs, wedding songs, laments, plus süýtgazan, sung to bring rain,
- lyrical songs, divided into läle and hymmyl sung by women and love songs sung by men,
- children's songs,
- legends, and

professional music, sung by bagşy and consisting of recitation of dessan, the traditional epic poetry. Turkmen musicologist Şahym Gullyýew generally shares these categories, though he includes lullabies among children's songs (though they are not sung by children), and includes all songs involving legends in professional songs.

Turkmen folk musical tradition generally lacks choral music, dancing, and percussion instruments. The main instrument is the dutar, a strummed, two-string member of the lute family. The primary wind instrument is the tuiduk (Turkmen: tüýdük), a type of flute. The dutar is traditionally played solo; if in a duet, the musicians (Turkmen: dutarçylar) take turns, and normally play in competition to determine which is the better. The appearance of dutars playing in ensemble, or performing purely instrumental music, is a relatively recent phenomenon not in keeping with tradition. Percussion instruments (the tambourine, mainly) are encountered rarely and then primarily in areas heavily influenced by Uzbek musical culture.

Other instruments include the gyjak, a bowed string instrument, and the dilli tuiduk, a reed woodwind.

=== Musical form ===
The principal form follows this structure:

1. başlamak (beginning or introduction)
2. ýappyldak (first movement, slower and usually in a lower register)
3. şirwan (climax or culmination, the middle movement)
4. çykmak (a calming close, the last movement)

Improvisation does not exist in music performed by professional bagshy; these musicians adhere strictly to traditional forms that have been preserved for centuries. The Smithsonian Institution describes performance as "highly structured and harmonically organized", with the pitch of the dutar being raised "as many as seven times" during a performance and the bagshy saving the "most emotionally charged poetry" for the highest pitch.

Turkmen poems consist of separate stanzas, "each itself consisting of four or five lines." The last line of each successive stanza repeats the rhythm of the last line of the first stanza; other lines follow the poem's general rhythm. The fourth stanza contains a radif (Russian: редиф), a feature of Arabic and Persian poetry.

Gullyyew and Rejepowa note the influence of Turkmen poet laureate Magtymguly Pyragy on musical form beginning in the 18th century, when, they postulate, bagşy split into two groups, the dessançy (reciters of poetry) and tirmeçi (singers). In the 19th century bagşy began favoring performance of poetry by Mämmetweli Kemine, Seyitnazar Seydi, Zelili, and Mollanepes.

=== Scales and modes ===
Uspenskiy and Belyayev identified seven basic scales, five of them analogous to Greek scales:

1. Phrygian scale
2. Aeolian scale
3. Dorian scale
4. Mixolydian scale
5. Hypophrygian scale

Scales 6 and 7 have no analogues:
6. A, B flat, C, D, E, F sharp, G, A, B
7. augmented second, A, B flat, C sharp, D, E, mordent

They note that scales 1, 2, 4, 5, and 7 have alternate forms. The origin of these scales is uncertain, but most probably from the ancient Greeks and Arabs with some influence of the Persians, as noted above. Tuýlyýew further described two types of scales, "natural" and "ancient national Turkmen modes".

Many songs use only 5 or 6 notes, and some are limited to 3 or 4 notes. Belyayev concedes that "to the inexperienced ear [Turkmen music] can seem monotonous and uniform" due to the "figurative severity of the coloration and the absence of any calculation of the external effect."

=== Dynamics ===
The bagşy chants loudly, a legacy of performance in the open air of the steppes, and "is devoid of any bravura". Turkologist Ármin Vámbéry described a bagşy producing "gutteral sounds resembling more the trilling of larks than a human singing." Chanting of poetry involves significant tension of the vocal cords and use mainly of the upper register.

== Women's songs ==
British sociologist Carole Blackwell points out the difference between folk songs sung by male bagşy and Turkmen women, each of which fulfills "important but quite different functions." Folk poems chanted by men, mainly dessan poems, in her words depict "epic, historical and mythical events." Women, on the other hand,

sing to express their feelings. The folks songs of Turkmen women...were created in a society that denied women the right to speak freely and valued their subservience and acquiescence...the women expressed feelings of sadness, anger, passon, and hope and found comfort in the realisation that they were not alone.

Types of women's songs include läleler (literally wild flowers), the songs of unmarried girls, which tend toward sadness and tales of woe; toý aýdymlary (literally celebration songs), which are wedding songs; hüwdüler, lullabies; agylar, lamentations sung at funerals; and monjukatdylar, fortune-telling songs, sung during the Novruz holiday. The last category of songs is sung privately, away from men, for many of them "express emotions...that Turkmen women were not supposed to have, or admit to." Although suppressed by Soviet authorities, since Turkmenistan became independent promotion of Turkmen culture has led to some preservation of these folk songs.

== Modern Turkmen classical music ==
Until 1919, music schools did not exist in Turkmenistan. In that year the Proletarian Conservatory of Transcaspian Oblast was founded in Ashgabat, with a branch in Mary starting in 1920. The Turkmen Artistic Technicum, with a music department, opened in 1929 in Ashgabat, and children's music schools opened in several cities in 1935. An opera and ballet studio opened in Ashgabat in 1937. Further, in 1935 a Turkmen department was founded in the Moscow Conservatory, to which gifted children were sent. As Victoria Clement has pointed out, the Soviets sought to control all symbols of power, including music.

By the end of the 1930s graduates of these institutions began composing European-style music, based on European scales and modes but incorporating Turkmen motifs, among them Weli Muhadow, Daňatar Öwezow, and Aman Gulyýew. Following the outbreak of World War II, many Russian and Ukrainian composers and musicians were transferred from cities near the front lines to Central Asia, including Turkmenistan, which exerted a strong European classical influence on Turkmen compositions. European-style operas based on Central Asian themes, such as Shasenem and Garyp, Leyli and Mejnun, and Zohre and Tahir, resulted from these collaborations.

In 1941 the Turkmen State Orchestra of Folk Instruments was founded, which developed modern orchestral arrangements of folk tunes. By the 1950s Soviet Turkmen composers had shifted from producing modern orchestral arrangements of traditional epics to paeans to Soviet power, including Bagt kantatasy (Joy Cantata), Kommunistik partiýa hakynda kantata (Cantata about the Communist Party), Lenin barada oýlanma (Thought of Lenin), and Salam Moskva (Hello, Moscow).

In the 1970s Turkmen composer Nury Halmammedov began to emerge as Turkmenistan's most prominent European-style classical music composer, offering compositions arranged for Western orchestration but, as Turkmen singer Medeniyet Shahberdiyeva, who performed many of his works, remarked, "The rhythms of Nury's works are Turkmen, but the harmony belongs to world musical culture." Halmammedov was not recognized widely, however, until after his death in 1983.

In 2001 then-President Saparmurat Niyazov banned opera as well as ballet in order to "protect Turkmen culture". Opera remained prohibited until 2019.

=== National anthem ===
As a Soviet republic, Turkmenistan's national anthem was "Turkmenistan", composed by Weli Muhadow with words by Aman Kekilow. In 1997, well after independence, the anthem was changed to the "National anthem of Independent, Neutral, Turkmenistan", the music and lyrics of which were allegedly written by President-for-Life Saparmurat Niyazov, but which in reality were written by a composers collective headed by Rejep Allaýarow.

=== Mugam ===
Mugam is a more contemporary, less traditional pan-Central Asian style of classical music, performed in Turkmenistan by a dutarist (Turkmen: dutarçy) and gyjakist (Turkmen: gyjakçy), or by an ensemble of just dutarists (Turkmen: dutarçylar).

== Contemporary popular music ==
During the Soviet period the Güneş Ensemble, a "one-of-a-kind band that blended together progressive rock, jazz, funk, and Turkmen vocals," was the lone popular music group incorporating elements of Turkmen folk music traditions. The group produced about 20 long-play record albums between 1970 and 1986 under the Soviet Union's Melodiya label. Over roughly a decade and a half, Güneş transitioned from a typical group performing Turkmen folk songs and Soviet compositions to a jazz fusion, ethno jazz, and progressive rock set of genres. The ensemble broke up in 1986, after which some of its former members developed a "synth-heavy Turkmen folk music that combined modulated traditional male vocals with incredibly fast-paced arrangements on drum machines and synthesizers."

These genres were banned following independence in 1991, when then-President Saparmurat Niyazov prohibited several art forms, including lip-synching, karaoke, ballet, and opera. Following Niyazov's death in 2006, pop tunes with Turkmen lyrics began circulating Turkmenistan on cassette tapes and CDs, most of them merely covers of foreign hits translated into Turkmen. Today Turkmen pop music consists almost wholly of covers of foreign pop tunes from across the globe, but especially from countries with weak enforcement of intellectual property rights.

== Folk instruments ==
=== Dutar ===
The dutar is the most representative instrument of Turkmen folk music. It is used in many styles, ranging from the mukamlar and saltıklar to the kirklar and navoi. These are performed by professional musicians called sazanda. Dutar means "two strings" in Persian. The word dutar itself is first found in the work “Scientific and Practical Canons of Music”, authored by Zainulabiddin al-Husayni, a Central Asian scholar and musician who lived in the 15th century.

=== Gyjak ===
The gyjak is a bowed stringed instrument adopted by Turkmen folk musicians only in the 19th century, first by the Khiva Turkmen, later in what is today western Turkmenistan, and only toward the end of the century in the Ahal tribal area. The gyjak was traditionally made out of a pumpkin shell or imported coconut hull, and was strung with three silk strings. In the 20th century mulberry wood replaced the pumpkin shell and silk string gave way to metal. The gyjak is tuned in fourths and is played as part of an ensemble with one or more dutars, or as a solo instrument, typically performing songs written for the dutar. Guseynov describes it as possessing a rich timbre and being loud.

=== Tuiduk ===
Tuiduk (Turkmen: tüýdük) is a type of flute. In Turkmen folklore, an ancestral belief posits that Adam, crafted from clay, lacked a soul until the harmonious tunes of the tuiduk, played by Archangel Gabriel, breathed life into him. A Turkmen legend attributes the invention of the tuiduk to the devil. Preserving ancient traditions, a ceremonial ritual invites guests to celebrations, where two tuiduk players face each other, elevating their instruments and harmoniously playing in unison. While doing this they perform magic circular movements which remind that this ritual used to be linked to shamanism. Guyseynov describes the tuiduk as "made of a hollow stem of an umbrella plant called gargygamyş and has six playing holes: five on the front side and one on the back side."

=== Dilli tuiduk ===
The Dilli tuiduk (Turkmen: dilli tüýdük) is a Turkmen woodwind instrument. It is a clarinet-like, single-reed instrument used mainly in Turkmen folk music. The instrument's range is greater than its finger holes would suggest, the upper registers being attained by breath control. Dilli tuiduk of the Turkmen can be carved in a couple of minutes by a shepherd in the springtime, when reeds grow tall. Dilli means "with tongue" in Turkmen and refers to the reed. Guseynov notes, "The dilli tuiduk (tuiduk with a tongue), one of the oldest musical instruments in the history of mankind, is even simpler. Its length does not exceed the size of a pencil. [The] muzzle is made of thin dry reed with a hollow stem, with a notched single reed and three holes.

=== Gargy tuiduk ===
Gargy tuiduk (Turkmen: gargy tüýdük) is a long reed flute whose origin, according to legend, is connected with Alexander the Great. A similar instrument existed in ancient Egypt. Gargy means "reed" in the Turkmen language.

=== Shamanic and folk instruments ===
Shaman bagşy exorcised evil spirits through use of specific instruments, including the dep or deprek, the Central Asian tambourine which descended directly from the Parthian tambourine depicted on rhytons found in ancient Nisa; the jaň, a small bell hung around the neck of the lead sheep in a flock or the lead camel in a caravan; the düwme, miniature tambourines hung on an infant's cradle or stitched to children's and women's clothing to protect them from evil; the üsgülewük, a children's whistle molded from clay in the form of a mountain goat or bird; the gopuz, or Jew's harp, and the şaldyrak, a stick with jingling noisemakers. Guseynov describes the şaldyrak as a rattle consisting of a heavy stone staff topped by a copper ball containing small stones and featuring small bells and jingling metal pendants. Tuýlyýew includes çemçeler or spoons as a folk percussion instrument.

== Bibliography ==
- Belyayev, Viktor and Uspenskiy, Viktor. Туркменская музыка. volume 1. 1928, reprinted 1979. Ashgabat: Turkmenistan.
- Blackwell, Carole. Tradition and Society in Turkmenistan. 2001. Surrey: Curzon. ISBN 0-7007-1354-9
- Broughton, Simon and Sultanova, Razia. "Bards of the Golden Road". 2000. In Broughton, Simon and Ellingham, Mark with McConnachie, James and Duane, Orla (Ed.), World Music, Vol. 2: Latin & North America, Caribbean, India, Asia and Pacific, pp 24–31. Rough Guides Ltd, Penguin Books. ISBN 1-85828-636-0
- Gullyýew, Şahym (Шахым Гуллыев). Туркменская музыка (наследие). 2003. Almaty: Fond Soros-Kazakhstan. ISBN 9965-13-839-7
- Gullyýew, Şahym and Rejepow, G. "Туркменская народная музыкальная культура". 2016. In Dubova, N.A. (Ed.), Туркмены, Moscow: Nauka. ISBN 978-5-02-039192-5
- Tuýlyýew, Suhan Allyýewyç (Сухан Аллыевич Туйлиев). Теория туркменской музыки. 2024. St. Petersburg: Planeta Muzyki. ISBN 978-5-4495-3457-6
- Zhavoronkov, B. and Larionov, V. Композиторы и музыковеды Туркменистана. 1982. Ashgabat: Turkmenistan.
