= Mollanepes Student Theater =

Student Theater named after Mollanepes
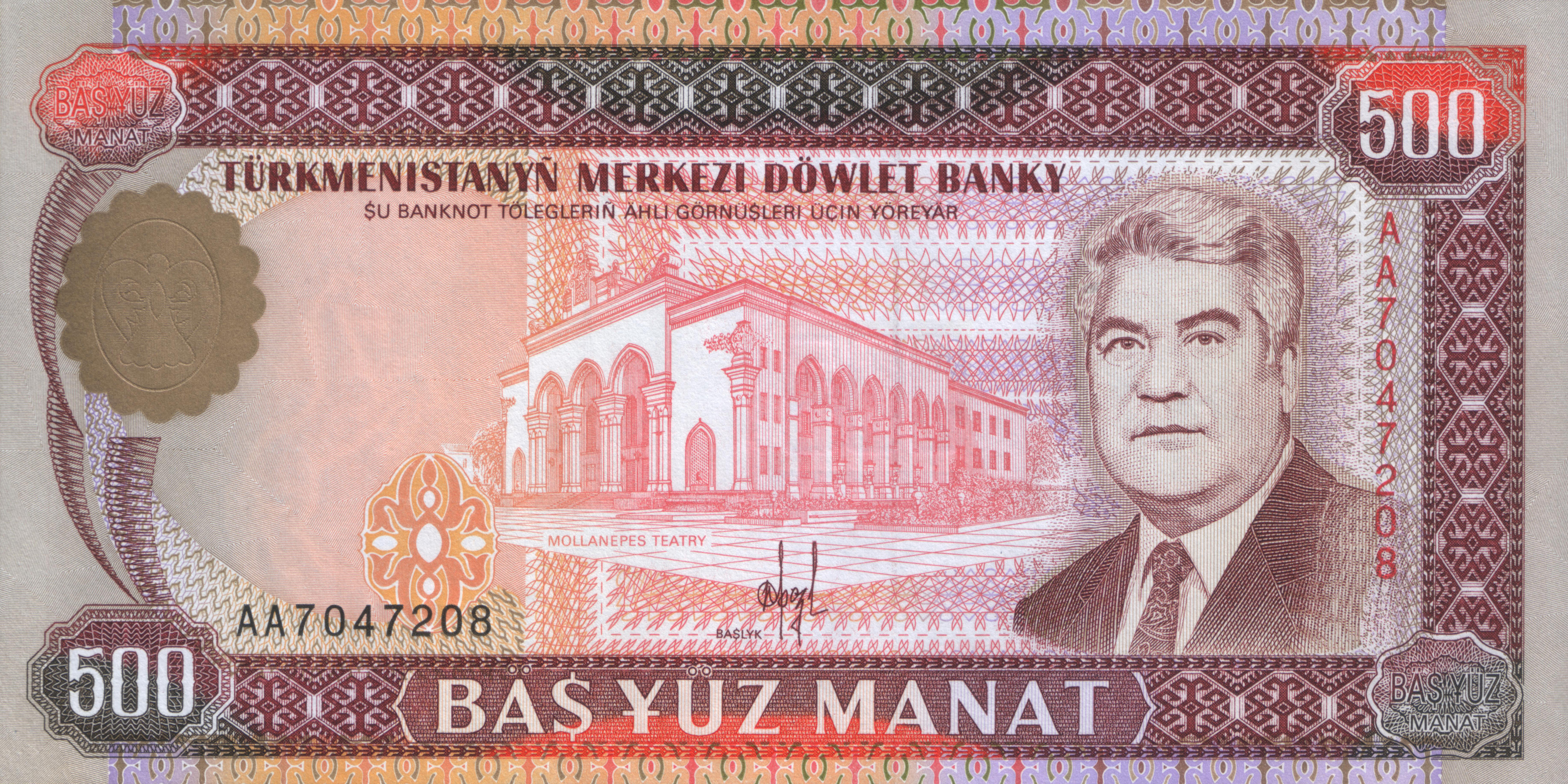
- Mollanepes Student Theater on the 500 Turkmenistani manat banknote.
- Interactive map of Student Theater named after Mollanepes
- Address: Makhtumkuli Avenue 76; Ashgabat; Turkmenistan
- Coordinates: 37°56′32″N 58°23′21″E
- Owner: Ministry of Culture of Turkmenistan
- Type: Drama theatre

Construction
- Opened: 1929
- Rebuilt: 1958
- Architect: A.V. Tarasenko (1958)

Tenant
- Tachmamamet Amangulyyev

The Student Theater named after Mollanepes (Turkmen: Mollanepes adyndaky talyplar teatry) is located on Makhtumkuli Avenue in Ashgabat, Turkmenistan.

== History ==
The theater was organized in 1929 in Ashgabat, on the basis of the national drama studio. It dates back to the first Turkmen Drama Studio since 1926. From the first days of work, it includes in its repertoire works reflecting the struggle of the Turkmen people for a new, socialist society.

During the Eastern Front (World War II) (1941-1945), the theater staged the works of Berdy Kerbabayev, Aman Kekilov, Konstantin Simonov and others, dedicated to the heroic struggle of the Soviet people against the German invaders. In the future, the team continues to create a national repertoire, puts on plays by authors from fraternal republics, works of Russian and world classics.

The current theater building was built in 1958, architect A.V. Tarasenko. Until 1963 it was called Turkmen Drama Theater named after Joseph Stalin.

Important events in the life of the collective were the participation in the Decade of Turkmen Literature and Art (1955) and the tour (1959, 1965, 1974) in Moscow.

The theater was awarded the Order of the Red Banner of Labor (1949), it was awarded the title of academic (1956), then the name of the classic of Turkmen literature Mollanepes (1963).

=== Independent Turkmenistan ===
The Mollanepes Student Theater is located in the building of the former Mullanepes Academic Drama Theater, in which a complete reconstruction was carried out.

In 2007, transformed into the Student Theater of Drama named after Mollanepes. The Student Theater is an experimental theater, and the chief director of the Main Drama Theatre of Turkmenistan, Honored Artist of Turkmenistan Tachmammed Mammetveliyev, took charge of it. He is the main director and director of all the main holiday shows in Ashgabat. Student theater, as a rule, puts on modern plays and is quite popular among the youth of Ashgabat.

== Repertoire ==
Artistic productions are expected for the younger generation, preference is given to plays by contemporary authors. The performances are occupied by students from the acting and directing departments of the Turkmen State Institute of Culture. For students of a creative university, practical work in the theater is helpful for further activities in creating new roles and directorial discoveries.
