= Culture of Turkmenistan =

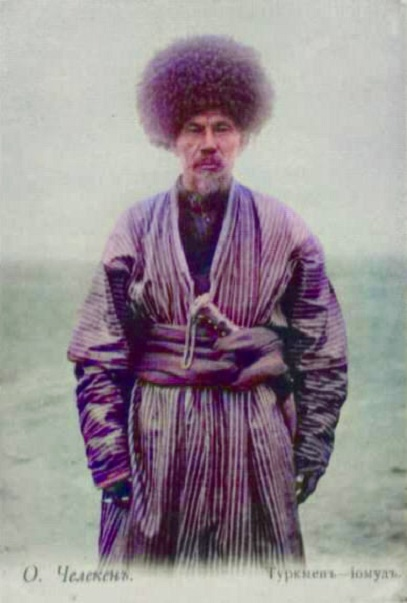
A Yomut Turkmen in a traditional attire, early 20th century.

The Turkmen people have traditionally been nomads and equestrians, and even today after the fall of the USSR attempts to urbanize the Turkmens have not been very successful. They never really formed a coherent nation or ethnic group until they were forged into one by Joseph Stalin in the 1930s. Rather they are divided into clans, and each clan has its own dialect and style of dress. Turkmens are famous for making knotted Turkmen carpets, often mistakenly called "Bukhara rugs" in the West. These are elaborate and colorful hand-knotted carpets, and these too help indicate the distinctions among the various Turkmen clans.

The Turkmens are, broadly speaking, adherents to the Sunni sect of Islam, with the remainder being a mix of Christian and other folk faiths.

A Turkmen man can be identified anywhere by the traditional "telpek" hats, which are large black or white sheepskin hats that resemble afros. Traditional dress for men consists of high, shaggy sheepskin hats and red robes over white shirts. Women wear long sack-dresses over narrow trousers (the pants are trimmed with a band of embroidery at the ankle). Female headdresses usually consist of silver jewelry. Bracelets and brooches are set with semi-precious stones.

== History ==
The Turkmen have a long history in Central Asia. However, not many people know their origins because they do not have a written record. They were historically pastoral nomads and shepherds. In fact, Turkmen people were made up of many tribes in the early 9th century.

== Language ==
Outside the capital, the national language of Turkmen is the most widely encountered. In Ashgabat and Türkmenbaşy, the Russian language is commonly encountered; however, with recent efforts to revive the ancient culture of Turkmenistan, Turkmen is quickly regaining its place as the chief language of the state.

== Literature ==
Two significant figures in traditional Turkmen literature are the poets Magtymguly Pyragy and Mämmetweli Kemine.

== Clothing ==
=== Male clothing ===
==== Koynek ====
Men wear white shirts called Koynek with embroided collars and sleeves depending on age. It can be made from different fabrics. Koynek collars can vary by Chak yaka, Gez yaka, Sopy yaka with the Chak yaka being the most common form used nowadays in ceremonies with other forms being rarely used. and most people only wear western style buttoned shirts nowadays. Religious clergy (Akhun) wear fully white shirts with no embroidery and the collars in modern time have become higher.

==== Balak ====
All sorts of pants are called Balak. Traditional balak are wide and fastened with rope or band and are made from Alataw fabric. Green and blue are worn by younger people, while darker colors are worn by elders. Nowadays, traditional balak are either used in more rural areas or have ceremonial use and they're mostly black and tighter in modern time dance groups. The wearing of Balak is more common among Iranian Turkmens during daily life and is interchangeably used among Pajamas and Kurdish pants. Most younger generations wear tight western pants more than balak.

==== Don ====
Don are robes made of silk or other types of cloth. The most common form is the Gyzyl don, which is red and made of silk. Clothes were traditionally dyed with natural ingredients such as pomegranate and its peel, walnuts and other herbs. There are also other forms of don made from different fabrics and colours. They can have a cross-collar design and be fastened with band or sash, while simpler designs are open in front with a straight collar and can be folded on either sides or left in middle and fastened with sash. Nowadays, the don only has ceremonial use and might be used at home by families of poets and musicians and only the red variety is used. In Afghanistan, Turkmens now rather use Perahan Tumban and wear local types of Chakmen(chapan) over it. In Iran, some families own or sew Don by themself and some shops offer Don to be rented for weddings usually with high costs. Modern Dons are made with high quality fabrics and embroidery and the purpose is ceremonial rather than daily use thus its mostly avoided to wash them fully since it can cause damage.

==== Chakmen ====
In other parts of Central Asia, the chakmen is known as chapan, shekpen and other names; it is open in front with straight collar and usually has a band to fasten it in middle. It has more colour varieties than Don nowadays. It can be made of fur, silk or other fabrics. It had been historically common among high-ranking people. Now in Turkmenistan, elders(aksakgal) usually wear dark blue chakmen in formal settings. In Iran, it is common for Akhun to wear a chakmen over white shirt while uniforms in grey and blue are also popular in modern madrasahs. In Afghanistan, the design of chakmen is different and more similar to Uzbek chapan and has lines coloured in red, blue, white, etc.

=== Female clothing ===
Women wear long floor-length dress called Koynek with a collar on the chest which can be embroided or not-embroided, in more formal settings Chabyt is worn over the koynek which somewhat resembles Chinese Beizi. Chabyt was also historically worn on the head to cover the face, other kinds of clothing such as chakmen, perenji, chadra were also worn over head and married women covered their mouth in the presence of in-laws and elders. Now in Turkmenistan head covering is less common and Yalyk/Yaglyk might be used specially by married women. In Iran, Yalyk is part of daily wear of Turkmen women, women who have gone to Hajj start wearing a white scarf below the Yalyk and women who get married wear a ring like crown on top of head which traditionally increased its height by every time they gave birth but now only one is used.

== Theatre ==
There are 10 state theaters in Turkmenistan: 5 in Ashgabat and 5 in regional centers.

== Music ==
Turkmen music is very similar to Khorasani music.

== Heritage sites ==
Turkmenistan in the list of World Heritage Sites
Image	Name	Location	Notes	Date added	Type
	Ancient Merv	Baýramaly, Mary Region	a major oasis-city in Central Asia, on the historical Silk Road	1995	Cultural
	Köneürgenç	Köneürgenç	unexcavated ruins of the 12th-century capital of Khwarazm	2005	Cultural
	Parthian Fortresses of Nisa	Bagyr neighborhood, Ashgabat	one of the first capitals of the Parthians	2007	Cultural

== Gallery ==
Tekke Turkmen kapunuk (door surround), early 19th century. A kapunuk is designed to surround a door frame, providing a decorative entry to a circular Turkmen yurt.

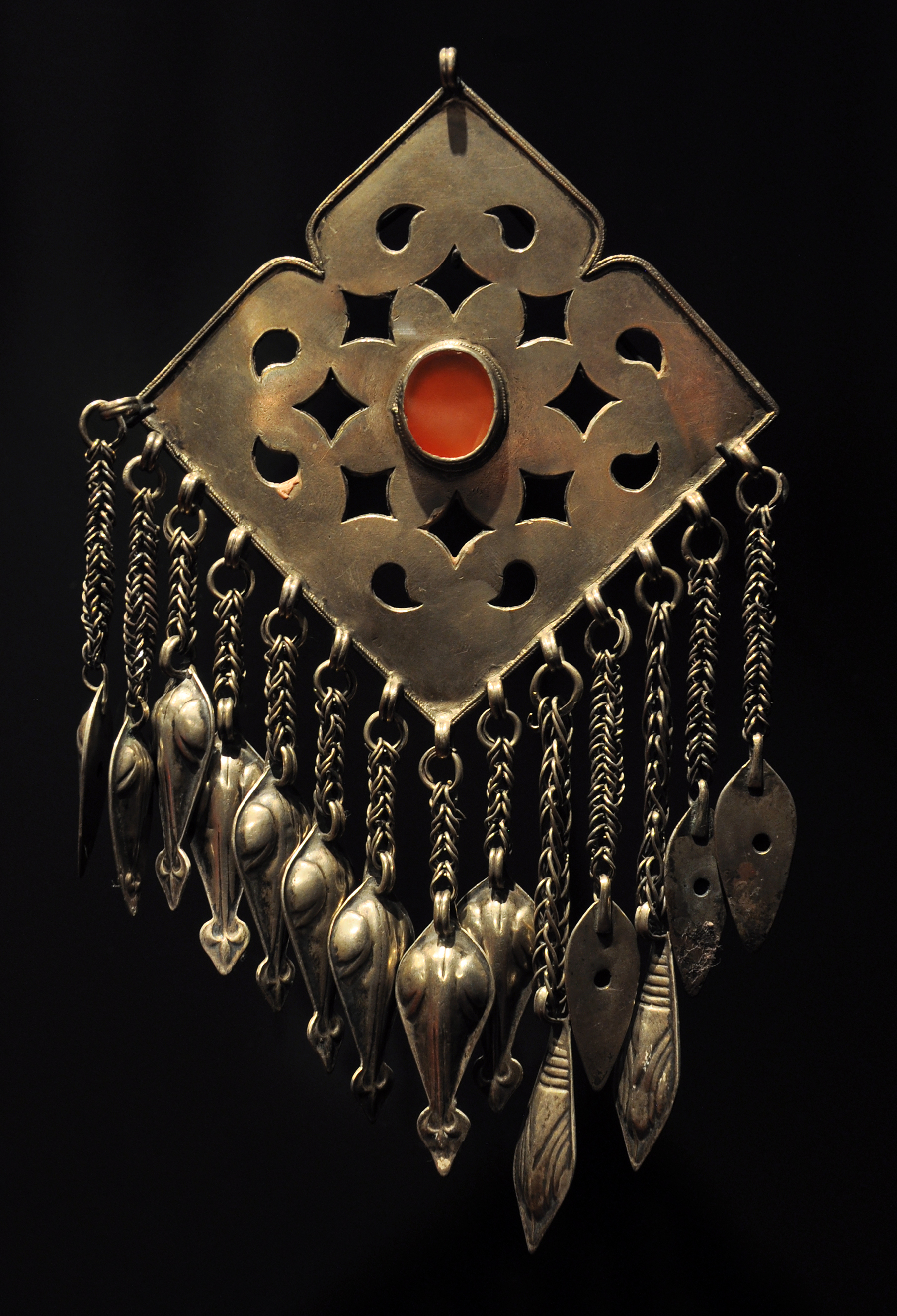
Turkmen woman's jewelry, metal and cornelian, 20th century. Musée du Quai Branly, Paris, France.

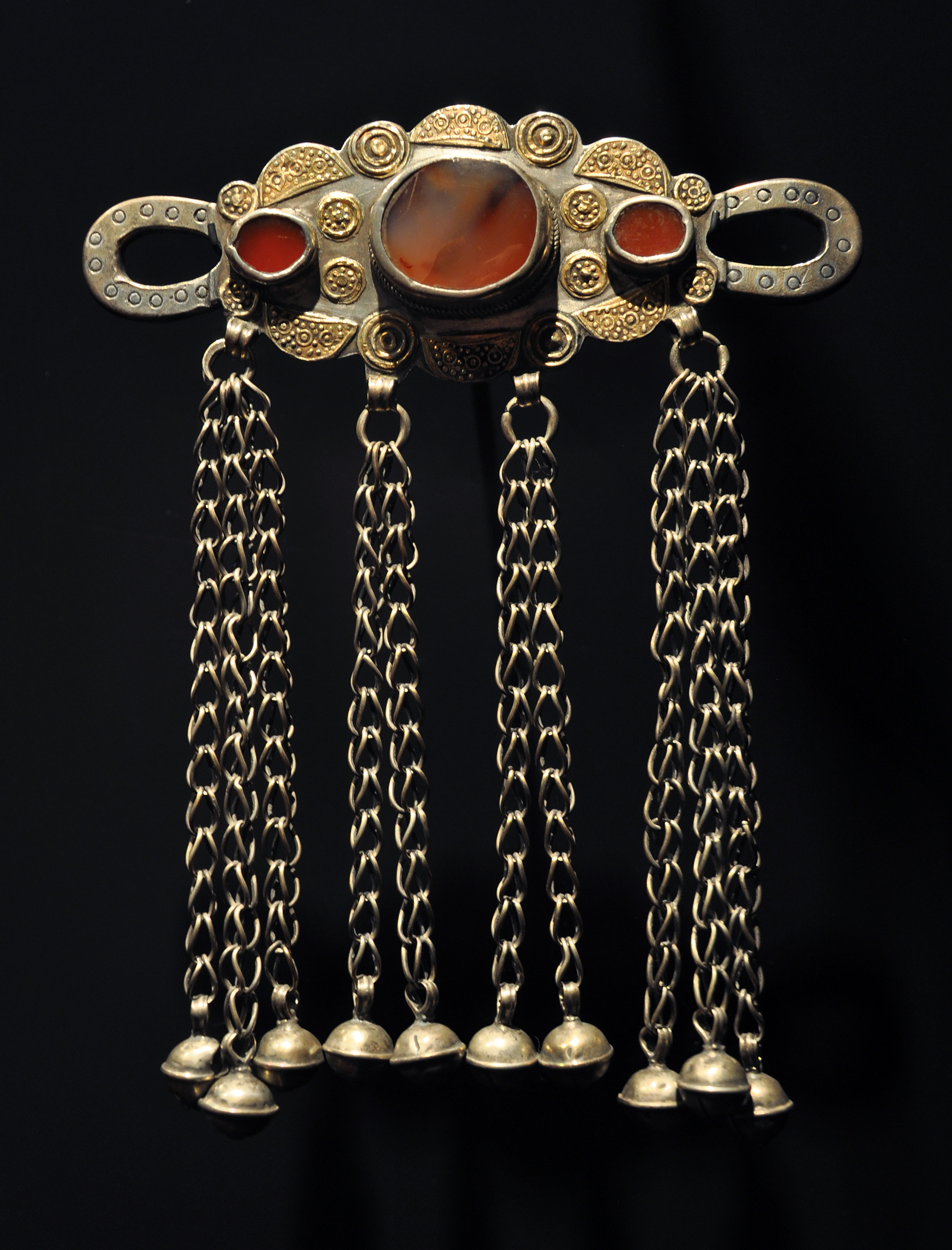
Turkmen woman's jewelry, silver, gold and cornelian, 20th century. Musée du Quai Branly, Paris, France.

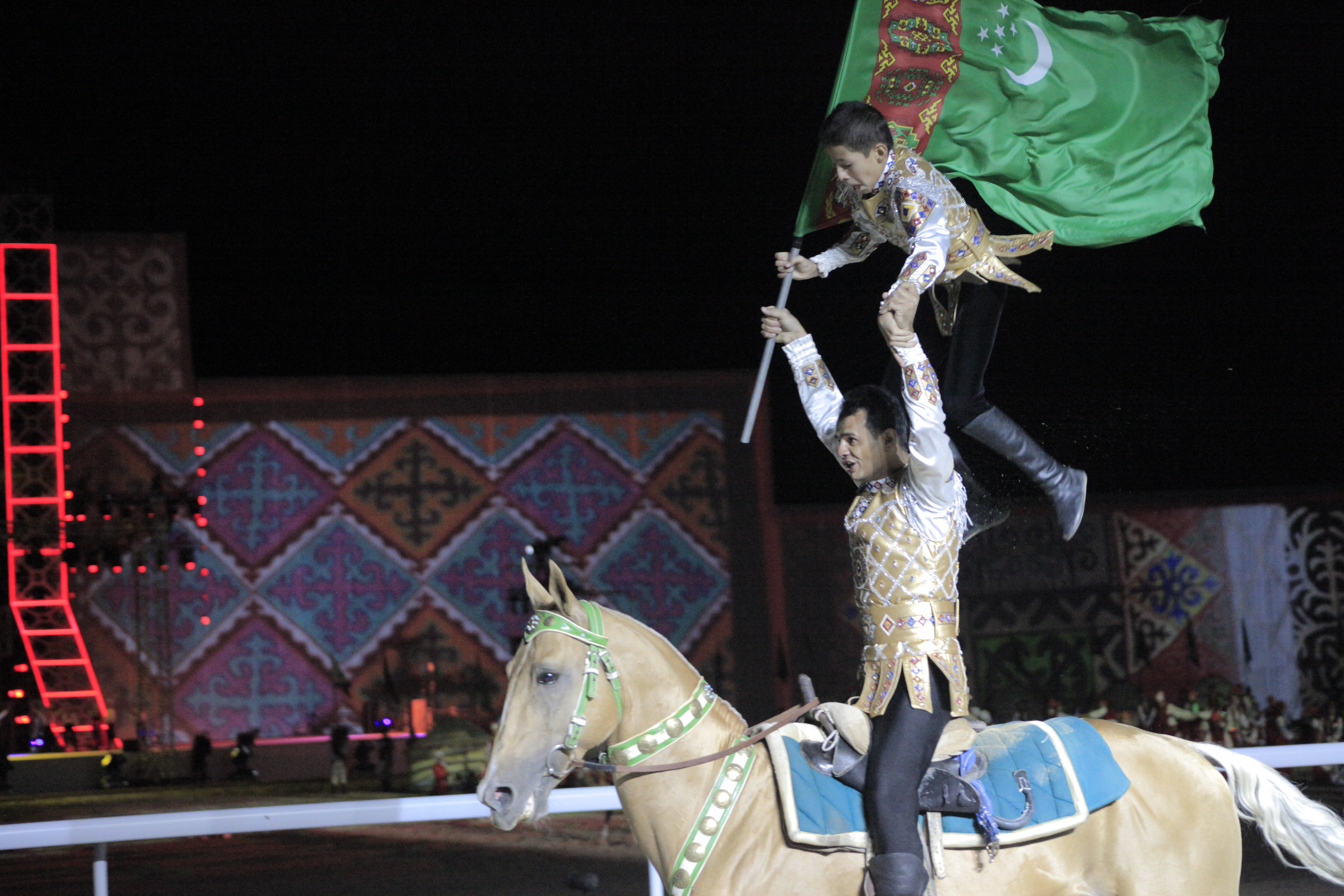
Turkmen man and his son hoist the flag of Turkmenistan while on horseback at the opening ceremony for the 2008 World Nomad Games.

== See also ==
- Akhal-Teke horse
- Yomut carpet
- Turkmen carpet
- Islam in Turkmenistan
- Merv
- Turkmen cuisine
- Turkmen jewelry
- Ertekiler (Turkmen fairy tales)
