= Magtymguly Musical and Drama Theater =

Theatre in Ashgabat, Turkmenistan

Coordinates: 37.93865°N 58.38392°E

National Music and Drama Theater of Turkmenistan named after Magtymguly
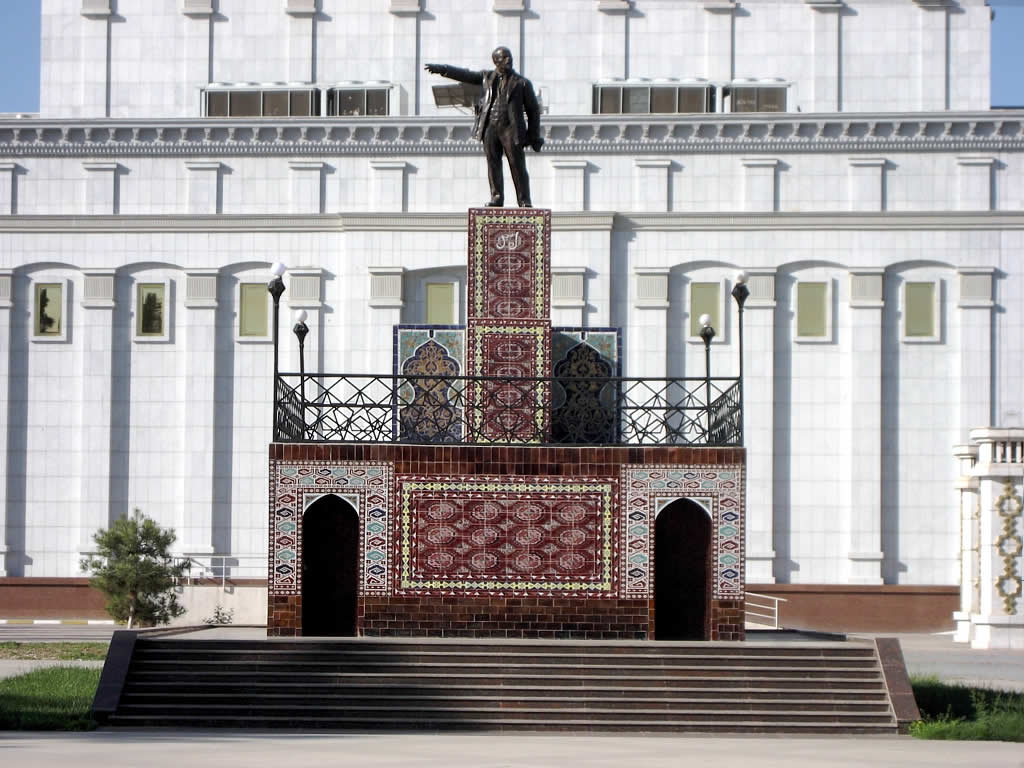
- Interactive map of National Music and Drama Theater of Turkmenistan named after Magtymguly
- Address: Görogly St. Ashgabat; Turkmenistan
- Owner: Ministry of Culture of Turkmenistan
- Capacity: 800
- Type: Drama theatre

Construction
- Opened: 2003
- Architect: Polimeks

Tenant
- Myrat Aradow

The National Music and Drama Theater of Turkmenistan named after Magtymguly (Turkmen: Türkmenistanyň Magtymguly adyndaky milli sazly drama teatry) is located on Görogly Street in Ashgabat.

== History ==
It was created in 2001, on the basis of the Turkmen Opera and Ballet Theater.

The new theater was built in 2004 near Turkmen National Conservatory.

== Building ==
The theater was built by the Turkish company Polimeks in a classic style, it features a dome and white marble columns on the facade. The project cost US$17 million. The theater hall was designed as a multi-purpose hall with 576 seats, on the ground floor and 224 on the balconies, with a total audience of 800 people.

The stage is on a rotating platform with a diameter of 9 meters on average and an orchestral pit of 55 square meters, which has a lifting organization system. The stage has a total size of 450 square meters and uses a counterweight system with 15 elements to organize theatrical scenery.

== Repertoire ==
The repertoire of the theater includes the plays of classic and contemporary Turkmen playwrights.

In the theater with tours there are foreign guests.
