= Alty Karliev =

- Alty Garlyýew
- Born: January 6, 1909; Babadaýhan, Russian Turkestan, Russian Empire (present-day Turkmenistan)
- Died: December 11, 1973 (aged 64); Ashgabat, Turkmen SSR, Soviet Union
- Occupations: Stage actor; Film actor; Film director; Dramatist

Alty Karliev (Note: Turkmen: Alty Garlyýew; Russian: Алты Карлиев, romanized: Alty Karliyev) (January 6, 1909 – December 11, 1973) was a Soviet and Turkmen stage and film actor, director and dramatist. He studied at the Turkmen Drama Studio and the Baku Theatre College (today the Azerbaijan State University of Culture and Arts), graduating from the latter in 1931. After this, he worked as an actor at the Ashkhabad Drama Theatre (today the Mollanepes Student Theater).

Karliev's first film appearance was as Kelkhan in the 1939 film Soviet Patriots. Other notable film roles included Nury in Dursun (1940) and Aldar Kose in The Magic Crystal (1945). His appearance in The Magic Crystal gained him a following across the Soviet Union.

Karliev did not have any formal training as a director, but learned from Russian and Ukrainian directors. His first directing credit was in 1957, when he worked with Yevgeni Ivanov-Barkov on the first color film produced by Turkmenfilm, Extraordinary Mission. His next film was Ayna (1960). This was followed by The Decisive Step (1965). His portrait was painted by Ivan Cherinko.

== Awards and honors ==
- Two Stalin Prizes, 2nd class (1941, 1949)
- Jubilee Medal "In Commemoration of the 100th Anniversary of the Birth of Vladimir Ilyich Lenin"
- Medal "For Valiant Labour in the Great Patriotic War 1941–1945"
- Order of Lenin
- Order of the Red Banner of Labour
- People's Artist of the USSR (1955)
