= Magtymguly International Prize =

Award

The Magtymguly International Prize is an award given by Turkmenistan to those who help achieve the aim of Magtymguly, an 18th-century poet; the establishment of an independent Turkmenistan. It was established on 19 May (Day of Revival, Unity, and the Poetry of Magtymguly) 1992 in the field of Turkmen language and literature was established. In 2008, in order to increase the authority of the prize, Turkmen President Gurbanguly Berdimuhamedow signed a decree, which approved the new composition of the relevant committee on awarding the prize. It is awarded annually.

== Recipients ==
- Saparmurat Niyazov (26 April 2003)
- Abdullah Gül (3 June 2014)
- Islam Karimov (16 May 2014)
