= Mukamlar =

Mukamlar (singular: mukam) is a term for bodies of musical repertoire for the Turkmen dutar (two-stringed lute) or tüÿdük (an end-blown flute). Mukumlar represents the most important repertoires in the Turkmen classical tradition after the baksy songs. There are several mukamlar for each instrument; instrumentalists may disagree on the number. There are, however, five dutar pieces acknowledged to form the repertoire: Goñurbaş mukamy, Gökdepe mukamy, Erkeklik mukamy, Aÿralyk mukamy and Mukamlarbaşy. The latter two may be compared to that of a level for virtuosos.

The small set of mukamlar that form the repertoire of mukam in its strictest sense "share a similar melodic structure." According to David Fossum, "All of these pieces shift into a distinctive melodic mode in the final section ... includ[ing] a lowered second scale degree and a raised third scale degree."

Within the strict structure of the mukamlar and other Turkmen music, ornamentation and differences in accent keep the music interesting and add to its beauty.

The repertoire gave its name to the 1974 Turkmen film The Secrets of Mukam (Tainy mukama), about a woman who learns to sing the music in the pre-Soviet era. Annaberdi Atdanov, a significant Turkmen artist, performed in the film, which has been described by Tamara Glazunova as "one of the cinematic masterpieces of Turkmenistan."

Despite their similar namings, the similarity when comparing Turkmen mukam and the Arabic classical tradition of maqam, together with Uzbek shashmakom and Azerbaijani mugam, is quite small. There are no intrinsic musical similarities. However, there are certain links, in terms of modality and technique, between the Turkmen and Kazak dutar and dombra repertoire.
