= Shemseddin Mervezi =

Court astrologer (1077 – c.1139)

- Şemseddin Merwezi
- Born: 1077; Merv
- Died: c. 1139

Academic work
- Era: Islamic Golden Age
- Main interests: Astronomy

Shemseddin Mervezi (Turkmen: Şemseddin Merwezi), also known as Shams al-Dīn al-Marwazī (1077 – c. 1139) was the court astronomer for the Seljuq sultan Ahmad Sanjar at Merv. Mervezi's work Ýyldyzlar kitaby (The Book of Stars) was one of the first books to describe the heavens.

Ýyldyzlar kitaby was published in the Turkmen language for the first time in 2006, having been prepared for publication using manuscripts stored in Istanbul and Vienna. The translation from the Arabic by experts from the Miras National Cultural Heritage Centre and the National Institute of Manuscripts of Turkmenistan. An initial run of 5,000 copies was produced.

Mervezi was born in 1077 near Merv, a centre of science and culture of that time, now modern Mary, Turkmenistan. He died aged 62.

Mervezi's Ýyldyzlar kitaby includes his own astronomical observations, as well as information about the night sky produced by his contemporaries. It used accessible language to describe the behaviour of the stars and the planets, was one of first texts about astronomy.
