= Hajji Qushan =

Village in Golestan province, Iran

Hajji Qushan Persian: حاجی‌قوشان
- Village
- Location within Iran
- Coordinates: 37°25′40″N 55°21′41″E
- Country: Iran
- Province: Golestan
- County: Gonbad-e Kavus
- District: Central
- Rural District: Aqabad

Population (2016)
  - Total: 4,546
- Time zone: UTC+3:30 (IRST)

Hajji Qushan (Persian: حاجی‌قوشان) (Note: Also romanized as Hājī Qūshan, Ḩājjī Qūshan, and Hājjī Qūshan; also known as Ḩājī Qūshān Derāz, Ḩājjī Qūsh, and Ḩājjī Qūshāndāz) is a village in Aqabad Rural District of the Central District in Gonbad-e Kavus County, Golestan province, Iran.

== Demographics ==
=== Population ===
At the time of the 2006 National Census, the village's population was 3,717 in 820 households. The following census in 2011 counted 4,010 people in 930 households. The 2016 census measured the population of the village as 4,546 people in 1,107 households.

== Notable people ==
The village is mostly known for being the birthplace of famous Turkmen poet, philosopher and Sufi, Magtymguly Pyragy (Feraghi).
