= Aq Taqeh-ye Qadim =

Aq Taqeh-ye Qadim اق تقه قديم
- Village
- Location within Iran
- Coordinates: 37°55′43″N 55°40′11″E
- Country: Iran
- Province: Golestan
- County: Maraveh Tappeh
- Bakhsh: Central
- Rural District: Maraveh Tappeh

Population (2006)
  - Total: 27
- Time zone: UTC+3:30 (IRST)
  - Summer (DST): UTC+4:30 (IRDT)

Aq Taqeh-ye Qadim (Persian: آق تقه قديم), also romanized as Âq Taqeh-ye Qadim and Āq Toqeh-ye Qadīm, is a village in Maraveh Tappeh Rural District, in the Central District of Maraveh Tappeh County, Golestan Province, Iran. At the 2006 census, its population was 27, in 7 families.

At Old Aq Toqeh is a modern mausoleum for the Turkmen poet Makhtumqoli Faraghi which was inaugurated in 1999 in the presence of Turkmenistan president Saparmyrat Nyýazow and Iranian minister of culture Ata'ollah Mohajerani.
