= Berdi Kerbabayev =

Soviet and Turkmen writer

- Berdi Kerbabaýew; Берды Кербабаев; Berdy Kerbabayev
- Kerbabayev in 1969
- Born: Berdi Muradovich Kerbabayev; 3 March 1894; The village Kowki-Zeren, Tejen District, Transcaspia, Russian Empire
- Died: 3 March 1974 (aged 80); Ashkhabad, Turkmen SSR, USSR

Berdi Muradovich Kerbabayev (Turkmen: Berdi Myradowiç Kerbabaýew; Russian: Берды Мурадович Кербабаев, romanized: Berdy Muradovich Kerbabayev; 3 March 1894 – 3 March 1974) was a Soviet and Turkmen writer, the national writer of the Turkmen SSR, an academician of the Academy of Sciences of the Turkmen SSR and a member of the Communist Party of the Soviet Union from 1948 until his death. He is one of the most prominent contributors to Turkmen literature.

== Biography ==
Kerbabayev was born on 3 March 1894, in the family of a farmer. He studied at the village school (mekdep) until 1917, then continued his studies at the Bukhara Madrasa.

He participated in the Basmachi Movement under Eziz-khan Chapyk. In May 1919, he left the movement and joined the Bolsheviks instead. During the Civil War, he worked in the political department of the Transcaspian Front.

From 1919 to 1924, Kerbabayev worked as a district instructor and served as the head of the rural department of national education. He studied at the Leningrad Orientalism Institute from 1927 to 1928.

From 1924 to 1934, Kerbabayev worked as the editor of "Turkmenistan" newspaper and "Tokmak" magazine. He was the head of the science administration of the Turkmen SSR from 1934 to 1936. He presided over the Union of Writers of the Turkmen SSR. He was later elected a deputy of the Supreme Soviet of the Turkmen SSR. He was also the member of the Committee on the Stalin Prize.

== Personal life ==
He had two sons – Bayram and Baky.

- Bayram (April 19, 1944 – August 8, 2020) was the Histology Department Chairman at the Turkmen State Medical University.
- Baky (1921–2009) was the director of the Central Botanical Garden under the Academy of Sciences of the Turkmen SSR. He was married to Eugenia Annakulievna Artykova (1926–1962). They had a daughter, Aylar.
- Aylar is a specialist in literature, and Candidate of Sciences in Philology. She lives in Moscow, Russia.

== Literary works ==
Berdi Kerbabayev started writing in 1923. He published more than 30 literary works of various genres: several plays, librettos, poems, literary scenarios and some prose works. At the same time, he translated the works of Alexander Pushkin, Mikhail Lermontov, Nikolai Gogol, and Count Leo Tolstoy into the Turkmen language.

In the poems "Girls’ World" (1927), "Enslaved" (1928), "To the New Life" (1930), the author described the difficult life of a Turkmen woman in the past. He also supported norms of socialist morals. The poem "Amu-Darya" (1930) is devoted to socialist construction. In the historical novel "The Decisive Step" (vol. 1–2, 1940 – 1947; vol. 3, 1955) the role of agriculture in the socialist revolution and friendly relations of Turkmen farmers with Russians are vividly depicted.

During World War II, Kerbabyev published the play "Hero of the Soviet Union Kurban Durdy" (1942), the poem "Aylar" (1943), the tragedy about the great Turkmen poet and patriot "Magtymguly" (1943), the play "Brothers" (1943), the libretto for the first modern Turkmen opera, "Abadan", the short stories "Who won?", "Aspiration", among others.

In the post-war period, the theme of socialist labour prevails in the author's works. "Aysoltan from the Land of White Gold" (1949), about the daily life of a collective farming village, and the novel "Nebit-Dag" (1957), about petroleum industry workers, were written during that period. The novel "Born by a Miracle" (1965) narrates the story of Turkmen revolutionary Gaygysyz Atabayev.

== Bibliography ==
- Afonnikov G. G. The humanism of B. Kerbabaev – Ashgabat, 1976. – p. 39.
- Ashirov G. The problem of internationalism in the novels of Berdi Kerbabaev – Ashgabat, 1978. – p. 26
