= Mollanepes =

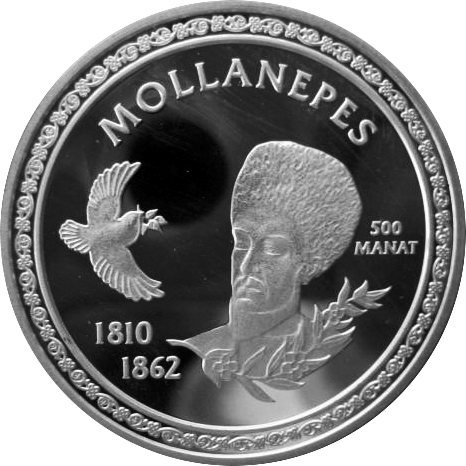
- Commemorative coin of 500 Turkmen Manats
- Native name: ملانفس
- Born: 1810 Near Sarahs or Sarakhs
- Died: 1862 (aged 51–52) Near Mary
- Occupation: Poet, writer
- Language: Turkmen
- Period: 19th century
- Notable works: Zöhre-Tahyr
- Relatives: Kadyrberdi (father)

Mollanepes Kadyrberdi ogly (1810–1862), said Mollanepes or Molla-Nepes, is a Turkmen poet and a national figure in Turkmenistan. He is considered one of the most important Turkmen poets, along with Magtymguly Pyragy.

== Biography ==
Mollanepes was born circa 1810 somewhere around Sarahs, Turkmenistan, according to the Turkmen tradition, or most likely near Sarakhs, Iran.

After studying in Mary, his father sent him to get a Quranic instruction in Bukhara and Khiva. There, he read and learned classical Middle-Eastern literatures; Ahmad Yasawi, Fuzuli, Imadaddin Nasimi along with oral traditions. Although he learned Ottoman Turkish and Arabic, his inspiration comes mostly from classical Persian literature.

His most renowned and most famous work is the epic Zöhre-Tahyr, a tragic story about impossible love between Zöhre, a rich princess, and Tahyr, a commoner from lower society. The story emphasizes loyalty, fate, and spirituality, following the tradition of classical Persian literature.

He died at around 50 years old, near Mary.

== Legacy ==
Most of his works didn't make it to posterity and were lost to time following Soviet repressions.

Nowadays, he is considered one of the greatest and most influential Turkmen poets, along with Magtymguly Pyragy, Döwletmämmet Azady, or Nurmuhammet Andalyp. He is sometimes nicknamed the "Shah of the Land of Love" ("Yşk mülküniň şasy") in reference to his love poems.

After the independence of Turkmenistan, several streets, buildings, and populated places were named after him. Among them is the town of Mollanepes, which is the capital of Wekilbazar District.
