= Döwletmämmet Azady =

Turkmen poet and Sufi scholar

- دولت محمد آزادى
- Born: Döwletmämmet c. 1695–1700; Kara-Kala, Safavid Iran
- Died: c. 1760; Zand Iran
- Resting place: Aktokai Cemetery, Golestan, Iran
- Occupations: Poet, Sufi, scholar
- Spouse: Orazgül (disputed)
- Children: Magtymguly Pyragy, Abdylla, Mämmetsapa, Zübeýda
- Parent(s): Magtymguly Ýonaçy, mother unknown
- Writing career
- Language: Persian, Arabic, Turkmen

Döwletmämmet Azady (Persian: دولت محمد آزادى Doulatmammed Āzādi; Turkmen: Döwletmämmet Azady) was a Turkmen poet and Sufi scholar. He is the father of poet Magtymguly Pyragy, the "father of Turkmen literature".

== Memory ==
The resting place of Azady and his son Magtymguly is located in Aktokai Cemetery, Golestan, Iran and is a place of pilgrimage. Every year, this cemetery becomes a place of pilgrimage for thousands of people.

== Institutions and organizations ==
The Turkmen National Institute of World Languages is named after Azady.
