= Magtymguly Pyragy =

18th-century Turkmen spiritual leader, poet and sufi

- مخدومقلی فراغی
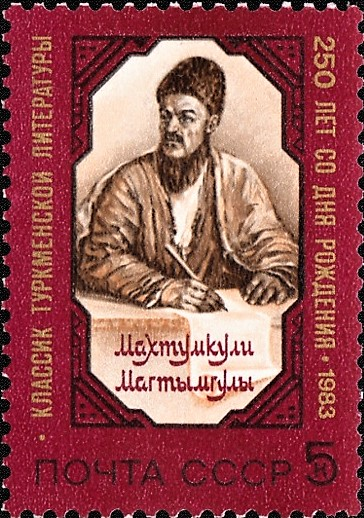
- A Soviet Union stamp with an artistic depiction of Magtymguly Pyragy, 1983
- Born: Magtymguly c. 1724; Hajji Qushan, Astarabad province, Safavid Iran
- Died: c. 1807; Khorasan, Qajar Iran
- Resting place: Aq Taqeh-ye Qadim, Golestan Province, Iran
- Education: Idris Baba Madrassah, Gögeldaş Madrassah, (Emirate of Bukhara), Şirgazy Madrassah, (Khanate of Khiva)
- Occupations: Spiritual leader, philosophical poet, sufi, traveller
- Spouse: Unknown
- Parent: Döwletmämmet Azady (father)
- Writing career
- Pen name: Pyragy (Feraghi)
- Language: Turkmen, Persian, Arabic
- Period: Golden Age of Turkmen literature
- Genres: Poetry, qoshuk form
- Subjects: Patriotism, social inequality, love
- Notable work: Türkmeniň
- Literary movement: Realism

Magtymguly Pyragy (Persian: مخدوم قلی فراغی Makhdumqoli (Note: Also romanized as Makhdūm Qulī.) Farāghi; Turkmen: Magtymguly Pyragy, IPA: [ˌmɑʁtɯmɢʊˈɫʊ ˌpɯɾɑːˈʁɯ]; c. 1724 – 1807), born Magtymguly, was an Iranian-Turkmen spiritual leader, philosophical poet, Sufi and traveller, who is considered one of the most famous figures in Turkmen literary history.

Magtymguly is credited with the creation of Turkmen written literature, and his literary form became a symbol of the historical and the incipient national consciousness of the Turkmen people. He is part of a unique period in the cultural history of Central Asia, with his personal poetic synthesis being influential to following generations of poets of the region. The poems of the Turkmen poet have been translated into many languages including English, Russian, Kyrgyz, Romanian.

In a wider context, Magtymguly is often placed alongside major figures of the Turkic literary world such as Hoja Ahmad Yasawi, Yunus Emre, Ali-Shir Nava'i and Fizuli.

== Biography ==
=== Early life and education ===
Magtymguly was born in Haji Qushan, a village near the city of Gonbad-e Qabus in the modern-day province of Golestan, Iran, the northern steppes of which are known as Turkmen Sahra (Turkmen steppes). It was part of the extensive Safavid Empire in the first half of the 18th century.

Magtymguly's name, signifying "slave of Magtym," derives from one of the revered lineages within the Turkmen community. In addition to his given name, the poet adopted a distinctive pen name or makhlas, "Feraghi," in his literary works. It comes from Arabic and means "the one separated from" happiness, or union with his beloved.

Magtymguly's father was Döwletmämmet Azady, himself an educated poet. His father was also a local teacher and mullah, and was highly regarded by his people.

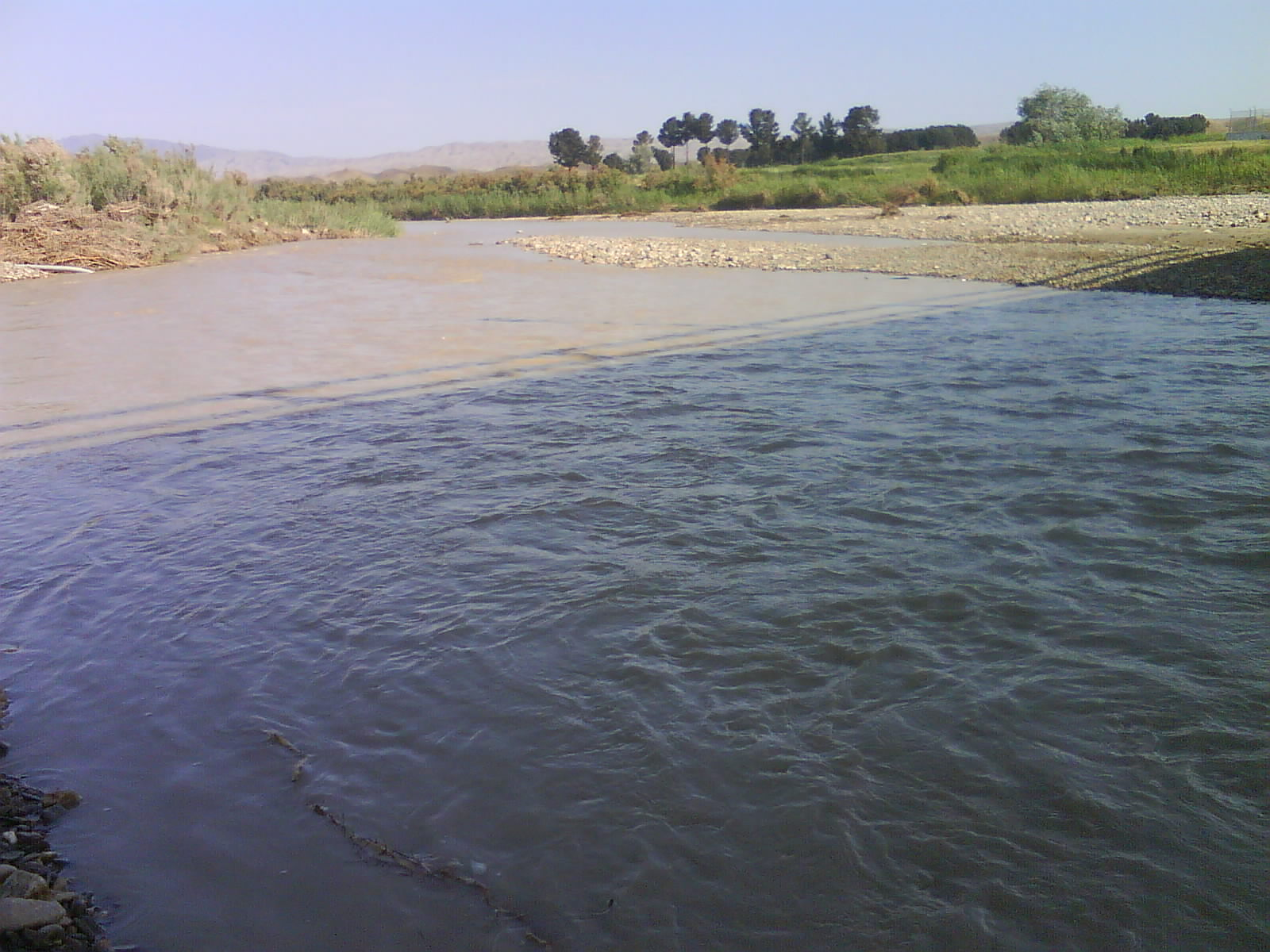
Atrek River, Golestan, the region where Magtymguly was born and lived most of his life

Magtymguly received his early education in the Turkmen, Persian and Arabic languages from his father. He also learned ancestral trades such as felt-making and, according to some sources, jewellery.

Magtymguly continued his studies in various madrassahs (religious school of higher learning), including Idris Baba madrassah in the village of Gyzyl Aýak, Gögeldaş madrassah in Bukhara and Şirgazy madrassah in Khiva.

Magtymguly provided basic information about himself, his family and children in his poetry. In his poem "Äleme belgilidir" (Known in the world), Magtymguly says: "Tell those who enquire about me that I am a Gerkez, I hail from Etrek and my name is Magtymguly", identifying his homeland as the banks of the Etrek River and expressing his identity through his tribe.

=== Later life ===
Magtymguly traveled extensively during his lifetime, mostly to widen his erudition, with the territories of present-day Azerbaijan, India, Iran and Uzbekistan among the countries known to have been visited by him.

Not much is known about Magtymguly's family life. He was unable to marry a woman he loved from his own village, Meňli, whom he dedicated a great deal of his love poems.

The following is the excerpt from Magtymguly's Aýryldym (Separated) poem dedicated to Meňli (in original Turkmen and its English translation):

Aýryldym gunça gülümden.
Syýa saçly sünbülimden,
Hoş owazly bilbilimden,
Şirin güftardan aýryldym.

I am separated from my flower.
From my black-haired beauty,
From my nice-voiced nightingale,
I am separated from my sweet-talking love.

Magtymguly died in 1807. His resting place is in the village of Aq Taqeh-ye Qadim, in Golestan Province, Iran. Nowadays, his tomb is the site of pilgrimages at which prayers and Sufi "dhikrs" are performed by members of different ethnic groups.

== Sufism and mysticism ==
A number of Magtymguly's poems display Sufistic philosophical attitudes that stress certain teachings and practices of the Quran and the sunnah, describing ethical and spiritual goals.

A number of Magtymguly's ghazals, however, when taken out of context, seem to make antinomian statements with regard to religion. Despite this, Magtymguly should not be compared to an Uzbek poet Mashrab, who was an antinomian heterodox Sufi and hanged in 1712, nor should he be compared to an Azerbaijani poet Nesimi, who adopted self-deification stance. Antinomian heterodoxy appears not to be the major trend in Magtymguly's poetry. His conventional stand, in fact, is the Sufi station of khajrat (bewilderment).

The following is an excerpt from Magtymguly's "Ýar senden" poem is an exemplary work containing all of the familiar Sufi elements:

Magtymguly, aşyklaryň mestinde,
Hyra gözi haýran olar dostunda,
Ýedi ýerde, dokuz pelek üstünde
Ýa, reb, habar bilerinmi, ýar, senden!.

Makhtumquli is drunk with love of You
His dazzled eye stares in amazement at his Friend
In the nine spheres above the seven earths,
Oh Lord, will I hear from You

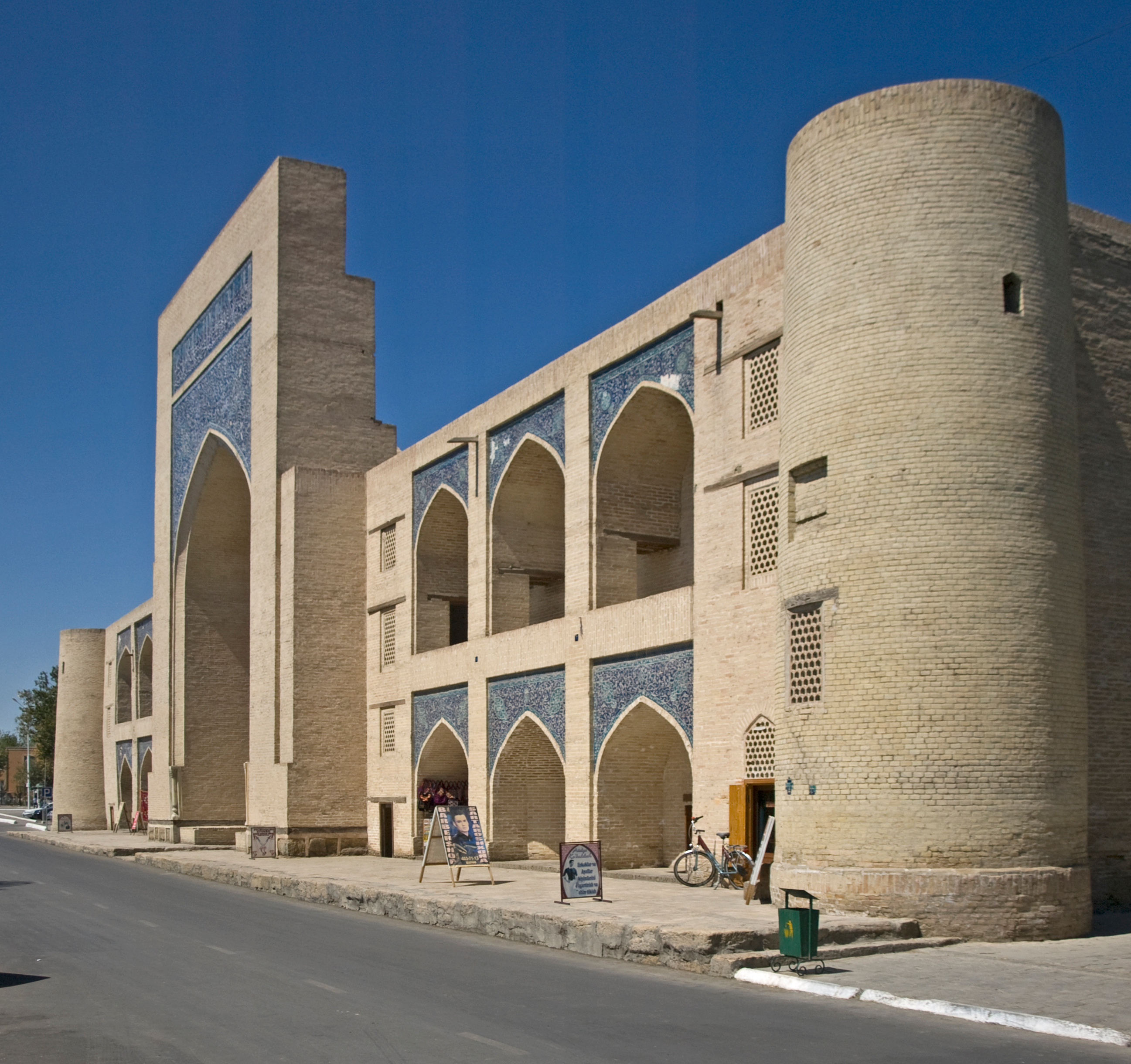
One of the three madrasas (religious school of higher learning) where Magtymguly studied – Kukeldash Madrasa, Bukhara (present-day Uzbekistan)

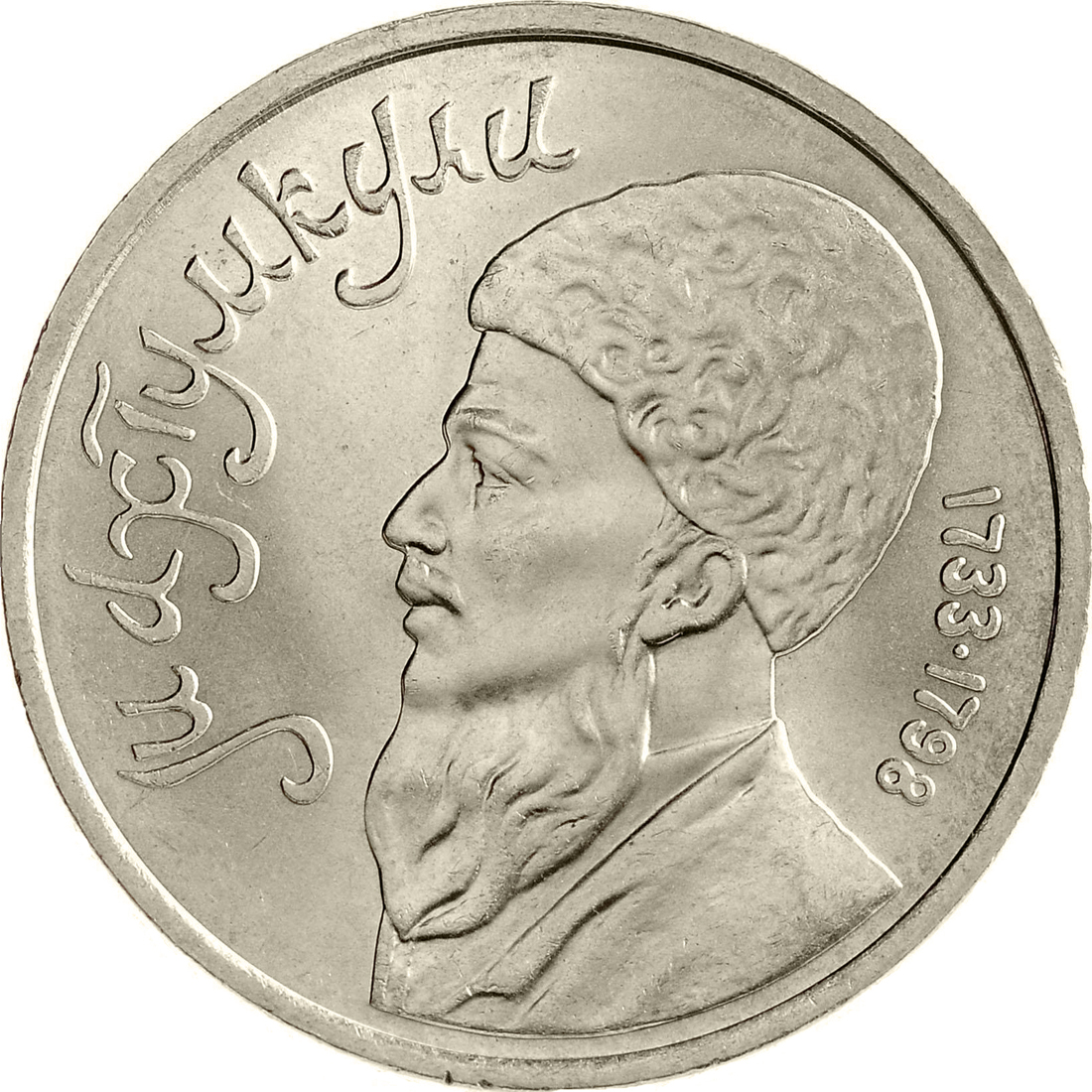
Magtymguly Pyragy on Soviet Ruble, 1991

The following verse is a call to follow the "sunnah", where Magtymguly also uses the laqab of Aşyk Pyrak (Feraghi-in-love). Note: The first four lines is the original (Turkmen) language of the poem written using Arabic alphabet as in one of the earliest manuscripts, while next are in modern Turkmen alphabet; English translation is provided further down.

1
عاشق فراق دير عرضين
روزه نماز ديان فرضين
Aşyk Pyrak diýer arzyn,
Roza, namaz diýen parzyn,
Feraghi-in-love will state his will,
Our sacred duty is to pray and fast,

2
بوينومزدا اوش بو قرضين
جان چقمان بريب كچلی
Boýnumyzda uşbu karzyn,
Jan çykman berip geçeli!
We have this debt on our shoulders,
Let's return it before we leave!

In the poem below, called "Bady-sabany görsem" (I'd Like to Feel the Wind of Dawn), all three people Magtymguly wishes to have seen (known) are considered prominent figures in Sufism, with Bahauddin being the founder of one of the largest Sufi Sunni orders, the Naqshbandi.

Dehistanyň baýrynda,
Bady-sabany görsem.
Bahawetdin Mirkulal,
Zeňňi Babany görsem.

I'd like to feel the wind of dawn,
On the hills of Dehestan,
I'd like to see Zengi Baba,
Bahauddin, Mirkulal.

== Political ideals ==
Magtymguly lived at a time when Turkmen tribes were displaced from their homeland, and plundered as a result of constant clashes with Iran and Khiva. He deeply resented it and expressed his feelings of repentance in his poems. Indeed, Magtymguly express strong social protest in his poems, but his political thought is mostly directed towards the unification of the Turkmen tribes and the establishment of an independent polity for Turkmens.

== Poetry ==
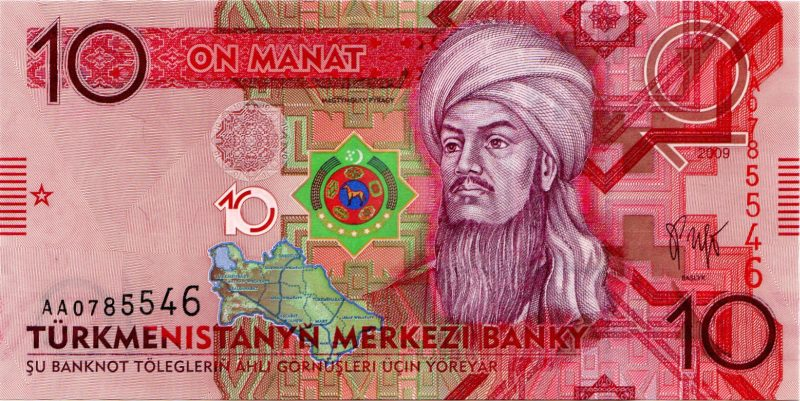
10 manat banknote of Turkmenistan with the image of Magtymguly (2009)

Magtymguly was one of the first Turkmen poets to introduce the use of classical Chagatai, the court language of the Khans of Central Asia, as a literary language, incorporating many Turkmen linguistic features. His poetry exemplifies a trend towards increased use of Turkic languages rather than Persian; he is revered as the founder of Turkmen poetry, literature and language. Magtymguly's poetry also gave start to an era litterateurs depict as the "Golden age" in Turkmen literature. His literary form became a powerful symbol of the historical and the incipient national consciousness of the Turkmen people.

Unlike his father and another prominent Turkmen poet of the era, Andalib, Magtymguly employed strophic form, usually quatrains (qoshuk) for his poems making them syllabic. Vast majority of his poems are in the form of folk Turkmen songs, qoshuk and aydish, with the latter being a form of musical contest usually involving two poets.

== Legacy ==
Magtymguly wrote during a period of cultural change in Central Asia, and his work influenced subsequent generations of poets in the region.

Magtymguly is often placed alongside major figures of the Turkic literary world such as Hoja Ahmad Yasawi, Yunus Emre, Ali-Shir Nava'i and Fizuli.

27 June is celebrated in Turkmenistan as "the Day of Workers of Culture and Arts and the poetry of Magtymguly Fragi".

The International Organization of Turkic Culture declared 2024 the "Year of the Great Poet and Thinker of the Turkic World Magtymguly Pyragy", the anniversary of Magtymguly Pyragy is also included in the list of significant dates celebrated jointly with UNESCO in 2024-2025. In connection with the anniversary, a large-scale plan of festive events was approved in Turkmenistan and other countries, including Uzbekistan.

=== Monuments ===
In May 2024, a monument dedicated to the 300th anniversary of the birth of Turkmen poet and philosopher Magtymguly Pyragy was unveiled in Ashgabat at the foot of the Kopetdag mountain range. The 60-meter sculpture of the poet stands on a 20-meter pedestal, to which a majestic staircase with massive granite bowls leads.

A monument to Magtymguly made of concrete and natural stone was erected in Magtymguly Square on Magtymguly Avenue in the center of Ashgabat in 1971. He is also one of several statues that surround the Independence Monument in Ashgabat. The statues depict people praised in the Ruhnama, a spiritual guide written by Turkmenistan president Saparmurat Niyazov.

Monuments to Magtymguly Pyragy are installed in cities across the former USSR. These include including monument in Astana, Kyiv, Astrakhan (Russia), bas-relief in Tashkent, and Khiva, as well as in Iran and Ankara (Turkey).

A bust of Magtymguly Pyragy was unveiled at Margarita Rudomino All-Russia State Library for Foreign Literature in Moscow, Russia in 2024.

=== Toponyms ===
- Magtymguly is a city in far south-western Turkmenistan in Balkan Province, the administrative center of Magtymguly District.
- Magtymguly is a zone in a gas and oil field in Turkmenistan.

=== Institutions and organizations ===
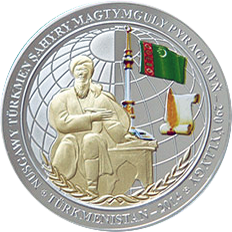
Turkmen commemorative coin depicting Magtymguly

The following are named after Magtymguly:

- Turkmen State University
- Magtymguly National Institute of Language, Literature and Manuscripts
- Magtymguly Musical and Drama Theater in Ashgabat.
- Youth Organization of Turkmenistan
- A library in Kyiv, Ukraine
- Municipal state general education institution School named after Magtymguly Pyragy in the village of Funtovo-1 (Astrakhan Oblast of Russia).
- Secondary school named after Magtymguly Pyragy in the daikhan association "Ergesh Sultanov" of the Dusti district (Khatlon region of Tajikistan).

=== Cinema ===
- Makhtumkuli (1968, producer Alti Karliyev) — the role was played by Hommat Mulluk.
- Fragi – Razluchyonnyy so schastyem (1984, producer Khodzhakuli Narliev) — the role was played by Annaseid Annamuhammedov.

=== Postage ===
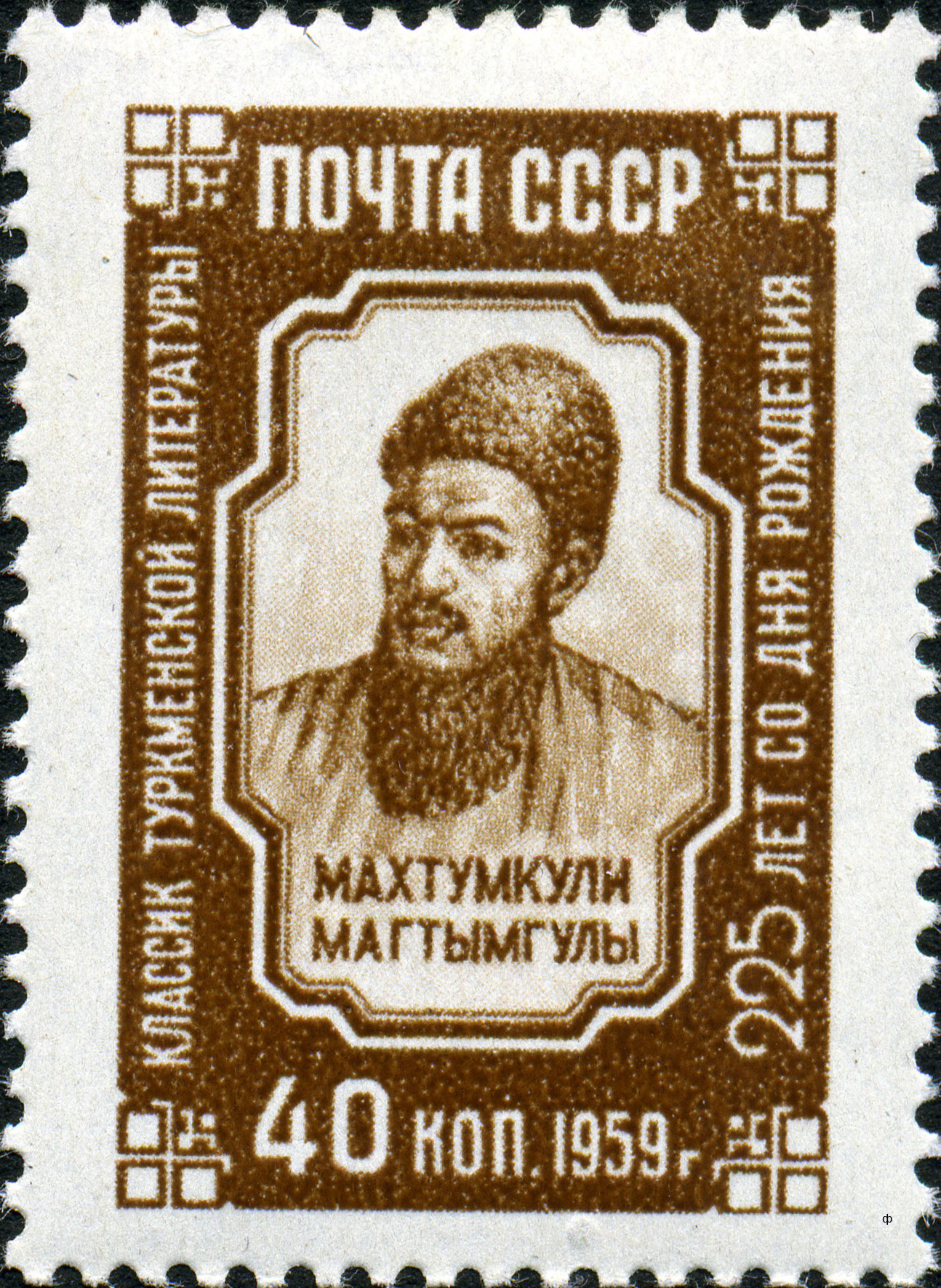
1959 postage stamp of the USSR

In 1959, the USSR issued a postage stamp to mark the 225th anniversary of the birth of Magtymguly. In 1983, the USSR issued another stamp to mark the 250th anniversary of his birth. Turkmenistan issued a 10 manat banknote bearing his likeness in 2009.

=== Other ===
- In 1974, an orchestral composition by Veli Mukhatov was created "In memory of Magtymguly".
- In 1992, the Magtymguly International Prize was established.
- In 2013, the composer Mamed Huseynov wrote an opera called "Monologues of Magtymguly Pyragy".
- From 2002 to 2008, the month of May in Turkmenistan bore the name "Magtymguly".
- In 2014, the Magtymguly Pyragy Medal was established as a reward for great achievements in the study, dissemination and promotion of the creative heritage of Magtymguly.
- A Turkmen dry cargo ship is named "Magtymguly".

== See also ==
- History of Turkmenistan
- Turkmen literature
- Turkmen music
- Bagşy
- Sufism
- Döwletmämmet Azady
- Magtymguly International Prize
