= Mämmetweli Kemine =

Turkmen satirical poet

Mämmetweli Kemine (c. 1770 – c. 1840) is widely known as a Turkmen satirical poet whose works have become a key part of Turkmen literature. Born in Sarahs, he studied at the Islamic madrassah in Bukhara.

Some forty of his poems survive. Many are critical of the clergy and landowners. His pious works, among them a long poem in praise of Fāțima (daughter of Prophet Muḥammad), although appreciated in local religious circles until today, have been suppressed in Soviet times and are still widely ignored as part of the Turkmen and Uzbek cultural heritage.
