= Turkmen language =

Turkic language of the Oghuz sub-branch

Turkmen
- türkmençe, türkmen dili, түркменче, түркмен дили, تۆرکمن ديلی ,تۆرکمنچه
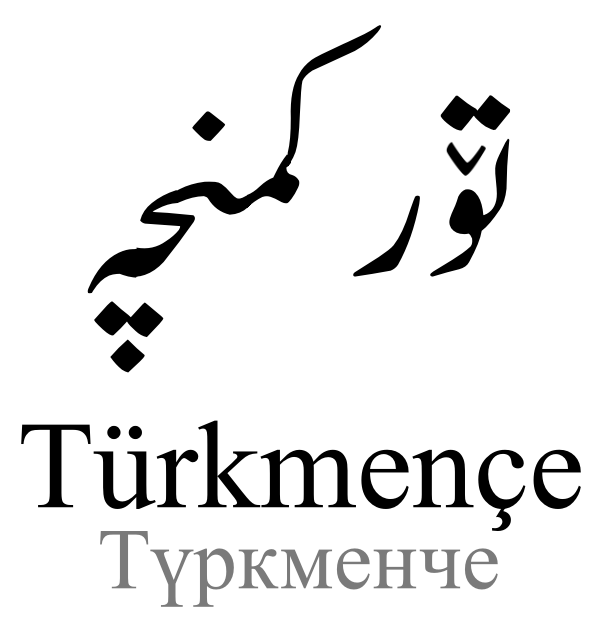
- Türkmençe in the Perso-Arabic, Latin, and Cyrillic alphabets
- Native to: Turkmenistan, Russia, Iran, Uzbekistan, Afghanistan, Tajikistan
- Ethnicity: Turkmens
- Speakers: L1: 6.8 million (2023); L2: 1 million (2021); Total: 7.8 million (2021–2023)
- Language family: Turkic: Common Turkic; Oghuz; Eastern; Turkmen
- Dialects: Teke; Nohurly; Ýomud; Änewli; Hasarly; Gökleň; Saryk; Ärsary; Çowdur; Trukhmen
- Writing system: Latin (Turkmen alphabet, official in Turkmenistan), Perso-Arabic, Cyrillic; Turkmen Braille

Official status
- Official language in: Turkmenistan

Language codes
- ISO 639-1: tk
- ISO 639-2: tuk
- ISO 639-3: tuk
- Glottolog: turk1304
- Linguasphere: Part of 44-AAB-a
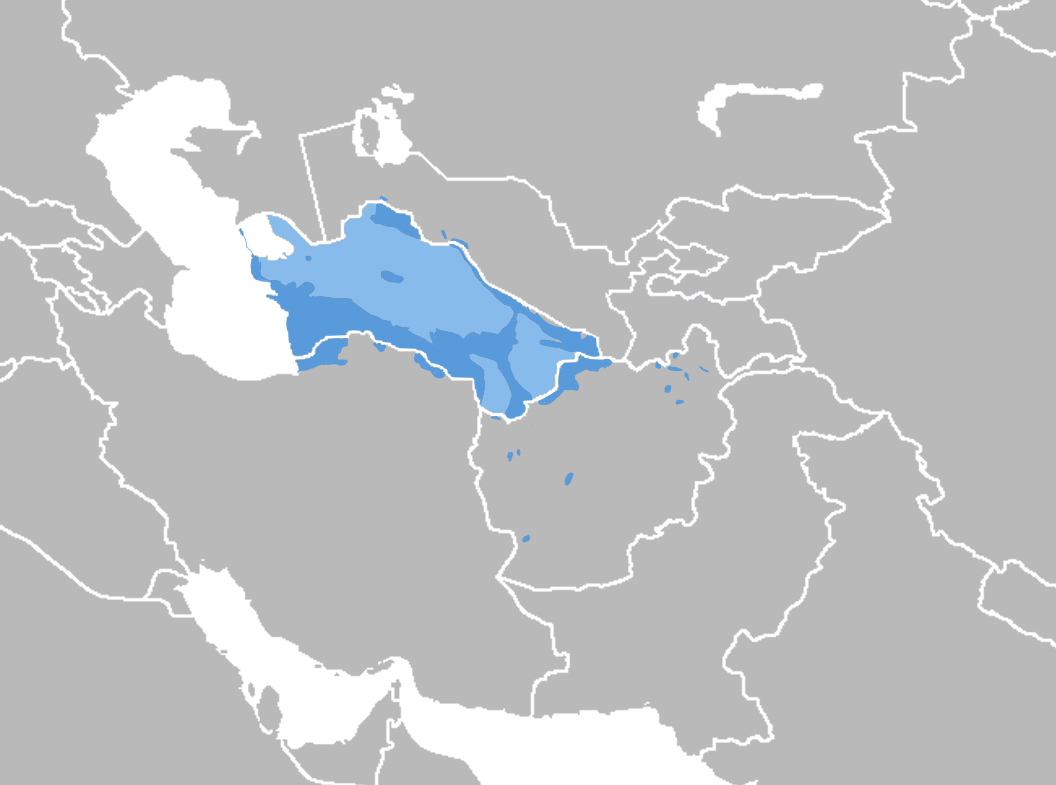
- The distribution of the Turkmen language in Central Asia

Turkmen (türkmençe, түркменче, تۆرکمنچه, [tʏɾkˈmøntʃø] or türkmen dili, түркмен дили, تۆرکمن ديلی, [tʏɾkˈmøn dɪˈlɪ]) is a Turkic language of the Oghuz branch spoken by the Turkmens of Central Asia. It has an estimated 4.7 million native speakers in Turkmenistan (where it is the official language), plus a further 359,000 speakers in northeastern Iran and 1.2 million people in northwestern Afghanistan, where it has no official status. Turkmen is also spoken to lesser varying degrees in Turkmen communities of Uzbekistan and Tajikistan and by diaspora communities, primarily in Turkey and Russia.

Turkmen is a member of the Oghuz branch of the Turkic languages. It is closely related to Azerbaijani, Gagauz, Qashqai, and Turkish, sharing varying degrees of mutual intelligibility with each of those languages. However, the closest relative of Turkmen is considered Khorasani Turkic, spoken in northeastern regions of Iran and with which it shares the eastern subbranch of Oghuz languages, as well as Khorazm, the Oghuz dialect of Uzbek spoken mainly in Khorezm along the Turkmenistan border. Elsewhere in Iran, the Turkmen language comes second after the Azerbaijani language in terms of the number of speakers of Turkic languages of Iran.

The standardized form of Turkmen (spoken in Turkmenistan) is based on the Teke dialect, while Iranian Turkmen use mostly the Yomud dialect, and Afghan Turkmen use the Ersary variety. The Turkmen language, unlike other languages of the Oghuz branch, preserved most of the unique and archaic features of the language spoken by the early Oghuz Turks, including phonemic vowel length.

Iraqi and Syrian Turkmen speak dialects that form a continuum between Turkish and Azerbaijani, in both cases heavily influenced by Arabic and Persian. These varieties are not Turkmen in the sense of this article.

== Classification ==
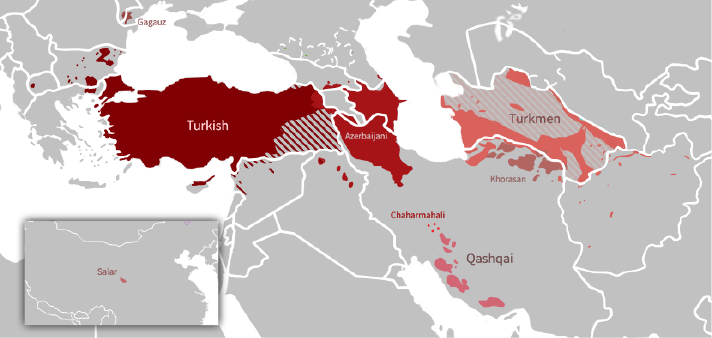
Areas where modern Oghuz languages are spoken

Turkmen is a member of the Oghuz branch of the Turkic family of languages, together with Turkish and Azerbaijani, with which it shares a relatively high degree of mutual intelligibility. However, an arguably closer language to Turkmen is Khorasani Turkic, with which it shares the eastern subbranch of the Oghuz languages, and also Khorazm, spoken mainly in northwestern Uzbekistan.

Turkmen has vowel harmony, is agglutinative and has no grammatical gender. Word order is subject–object–verb.

Written Turkmen today is based on the Teke (Tekke) dialect. The other dialects are Nohurly, Ýomud, Änewli, Hasarly, Nerezim, Gökleň, Salyr, Saryk, Ärsary and Çowdur. The Teke dialect is sometimes (especially in Afghanistan) referred to as "Chagatai", but like all Turkmen dialects it reflects only a limited influence from classical Chagatai.

== Comparison with other Turkic languages ==
Turkmen has dental fricatives /θ/ and /ð/ unlike other Oghuz Turkic languages, where these sounds are pronounced as /s/ and /z/. The only other Turkic language with a similar feature is Bashkir. However, in Bashkir /θ/ and /ð/ are two independent phonemes, distinct from /s/ and /z/, whereas in Turkmen [θ] and [ð] are the two main realizations of the common Turkic /s/ and /z/. In other words, there are no /s/ and /z/ phonemes in Turkmen, unlike Bashkir, which has /s/, /z/, /θ/ and /ð/.

=== Turkmen vs. Azerbaijani ===
The 1st person personal pronoun is "men" in Turkmen, just as "mən" in Azerbaijani, whereas it is "ben" in Turkish. The same is true for demonstrative pronouns "bu", where sound "b" is replaced with sound "m". For example: "bunun>munun//mının, muna//mına, munu//munı, munda//mında, mundan//mından". In Turkmen, "bu" undergoes some changes just as in: "munuñ, munı, muña, munda, mundan".

Here are some words with a different pronunciation in Turkmen and Azerbaijani that mean the same in both languages:

| Turkmen | Azeri | English |
|---|---|---|
| men | mən | I, me |
| sen | sən | you |
| haçan | haçan | when |
| başga | başqa | other |
| it, köpek | it, köpək | dog |
| deri | dəri | skin, leather |
| ýumurtga | yumurta | egg |
| ýürek | ürək | heart |
| eşitmek | eşitmək | to hear |

=== Turkmen vs. Turkish ===
Turkey was first to recognize Turkmenistan's independence on 27 October 1991, following the Dissolution of the Soviet Union and to open its embassy in Ashgabat on 29 February 1992. Sharing a common history, religion, language and culture, the two states have balanced special relations based on mutual respect and the principle of "One Nation, Two States".

Turkmen language is very close to Turkish with regard to linguistic properties. However, there are a couple of differences due to regional and historical reasons. Most morphophonetic rules are common in Turkmen and Turkish languages. For instance, both languages show vowel harmony and consonant mutation rules, and have similar suffixes with very close semantics.

Here are some words from the Swadesh list in Turkmen and Turkish that mean the same in both languages:

| Turkmen | Turkish | English |
|---|---|---|
| men | ben | I, me |
| uzyn | uzun | long |
| agaç | ağaç | tree |
| göz | göz | eye |
| ýürek | yürek | heart |
| ýaşamak | yaşamak | to live |
| suw | su | water |
| asman (Note: (loaned from Persian)) | gök | sky |
| dogry | doğru | correct |

== Phonology ==
Vowels
| | Front | | Back | |
| | Unrounded | Rounded | Unrounded | Rounded |
|---|---|---|---|---|
| Close | ɪ ɪː | ʏ ʏː | ɯ ɯː | ʊ ʊː |
| Mid | ɛ | œ œː | | o oː |
| Open | æː | | ɑ ɑː | |

Consonants
| | | Labial | Alveolar/Dental | Palatal | Velar | Glottal |
|---|---|---|---|---|---|---|
| Nasal | | m | n | | ŋ | |
| Stop/ Affricate | voiceless | p | t | tʃ | k | |
| Stop/ Affricate | voiced | b | d | dʒ | ɡ | |
| Fricative | voiceless | f | θ~s | ʃ | | h |
| Fricative | voiced | β~w | ð~z | ʒ | | |
| Approximant | | β~w | l | j | | |
| Tap/Trill | | | r~ɾ | | | |

== Writing system ==
The Turkmen written language was formed in the 13–14th centuries, with its literary tradition dating back to the 14th century. During this period, the Arabic alphabet was used extensively for writing. By the 18th century, there had been a rich literary tradition in the Turkmen language. At the same time, the literacy of the population in their native language remained at low levels; book publishing was extremely limited, and the first primer in the Turkmen language appeared only in 1913, while the first newspaper ("Transcaspian native newspaper") was printed in 1914.

The Arabic script was not adapted to the phonetic features of the Turkic languages. Thus, it did not have necessary signs to designate specific sounds of the Turkmen language, and at the same time there were many letters to designate Arabic sounds that were not in the Turkmen language.

During the first years after the establishment of the Soviet power, the Arabic alphabet of Turkmen under the USSR was reformed twice, in 1922 and 1925. In the course of the reforms, letters with diacritics were introduced to denote Turkic phonemes; and letters were abolished for sounds that are absent in the Turkmen language.

The Turkmens of Afghanistan and Iran continue to use Arabic script.

In January 1925, on the pages of the republican newspaper Türkmenistan, the question of switching to a new, Latin alphabet was raised. After the first All-Union Turkological Congress in Baku (February–March 1926), the State Academic Council under the People's Commissariat of Education of the Turkmen SSR developed a draft of a new alphabet. On 3 January 1928, the revised new Latin alphabet was approved by the Central Executive Committee of the Turkmen SSR.

At the end of the 1930s, the process of the Cyrillization of writing began throughout the USSR. In January 1939, the newspaper Sowet Türkmenistany published a letter from teachers in Ashgabat and the Ashgabat region with an initiative to replace the Turkmen (Latin) script with Cyrillic. The Presidium of the Supreme Soviet of the Turkmen SSR instructed the Research Institute of Language and Literature to draw up a draft of a new alphabet. The teachers of the Ashgabat Pedagogical Institute and print workers also took part in the development of the new writing system. In April 1940, the draft alphabet was published.

In May 1940, the Council of People's Commissars of the Turkmen SSR adopted a resolution on the transition to a new alphabet of all state and public institutions from 1 July 1940, and on the beginning of teaching the new alphabet in schools from 1 September of the same year.

After the dissolution of the Soviet Union, in January 1993, a meeting was held at the Academy of Sciences of Turkmenistan on the issue of replacing the Cyrillic with the Latin alphabet, at which a commission was formed to develop the alphabet. In February, a new version of the alphabet was published in the press. On 12 April 1993, the Mejlis of Turkmenistan approved a presidential decree on the new alphabet.

== Grammar ==
Turkmen is a highly agglutinative language, in that much of the grammar is expressed by means of suffixes added to nouns and verbs. It is very regular compared with many other languages of non-Turkic group. For example, obalardan "from the villages" can be analysed as oba "village", -lar (plural suffix), -dan (ablative case, meaning "from"); alýaryn "I am taking" as al "take", -ýar (present continuous tense), -yn (1st person singular).

Another characteristic of Turkmen is vowel harmony. Most suffixes have two or four different forms, the choice between which depends on the vowel of the word's root or the preceding suffix: For example, the ablative case of obalar is obalardan "from the villages" but, the ablative case of itler "dogs" is itlerden "from the dogs".

Declension examples (with vowel length)
| Case | Example | Consonant-ending nouns | | | Vowel-ending nouns | | | With consonant voicing | With vowel deletion |
| Case | Example | sygyr | ner | öý | ýara | gije | doly | köpek | ogul |
|---|---|---|---|---|---|---|---|---|---|
| Nominative | Sygyr yzyna geldi. | sygyr | ner | öý | ýara | gije | doly | köpek | ogul |
| Accusative | Men sygyry sagdym. | sygyry | neri | öýi | ýarāny | gijǟni | dolȳny | köpegi | ogly |
| Genitive | Men sygyryň guýrugyny çekdim. | sygyryň | neriň | öýüň | ýarānyň | gijǟniň | dolȳnyň | köpegiň | ogluň |
| Dative | Men sygyra iým berdim. | sygyra | nere | öýe | ýarā | gijǟ | dola | köpege | ogla |
| Locative | Sygyrda näme günä bar? | sygyrda | nerde | öýde | ýarada | gijede | doluda | köpekde | ogulda |
| Ablative | Bu kesel sygyrdan geçdi. Men sygyrdan ýadadym. | sygyrdan | nerden | öýden | ýaradan | gijeden | doludan | köpekden | oguldan |

=== Directives and speech levels ===
Levels of respect or formality are focused on the final suffix of commands, while in normal sentences adding -dyr can increase formality.

| Usage | Suffix | | Example | | Note |
| Usage | Positive | Negative | Positive | Negative | Note |
|---|---|---|---|---|---|
| Neutral | -Ø[iň] | -ma[:ň] | bar[yň] | barma[:ň] | offensive if used with elders without -ň (plural marker). |
| Familiar | -sana | -masana | gelsene | gelmesene | common between friends. |
| Polite | -gyn | -magyn | goýgyn | goýmagyn | respectful but insistent on request. |
| Polite request(suggestive) | -a:ý[yň] | -ma:ý[yň] / -a:ýma[:ň] | gidäý | gitmäý[iň]/gidäýmäň | -ma:ý[yň] simply suggests not doing while -a:ýma[:ň] increases respect to the addressee . |
| Formal Polite | -saňyzla:[ň] | -masaňyzla:[ň] | gaýtsaňyzla:[ň] | gaýtmasaňyzla:[ň] | |
| Respectful request | -i:ber[iň] | -i:bermä[:ň] | aýdyber | aýdybermä[:ň] | more common when the requested action is imminent. |
| Highly polite | -a:wer[i] | -ma:wer[i] / -a:werma[:ň] | edäweri | etmäweri / edäwermäň | used when talking to an elder or a ruler or when praying. |
| Polite command | -saňyz | -masaňyz | alsaňyz | almasaňyz | |
| Highly polite suggestion | -a:ýsyňyz | -ma:ýsyňyz | ýaza:ýsyňyz | ýazma:ýsyňyz | |
| Hortative | -a:ýyn | -ma:ýyn | gidäýin | gitmäýin | e.g. let me go/not go (as a question: shall I go? shall I not go?) |
| Cohortative | -a:ly[:ň] | -ma:ly[:ň] | başla:ly[:ň] | başlama:ly[:ň] | -:ň is used if and only if the addressee is more than two people. |
| 3rd p. directive | -syn[lar] | -masyn[lar] | bolsun[lar] | bolmasyn[lar] | used in wishes or indirect commands. |

== Literature ==
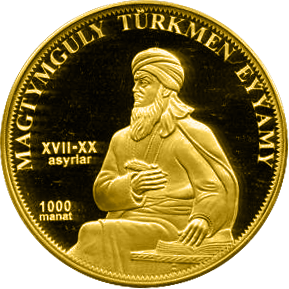
Magtymguly Pyragy on the commemorative coin of Turkmenistan

Turkmen literature comprises oral compositions and written texts in Old Oghuz Turkic and Turkmen languages. Turkmens are direct descendants of the Oghuz Turks, who were a western Turkic people that spoke the Oghuz branch of the Turkic language family.

The earliest development of the Turkmen literature is closely associated with the literature of the Oghuz Turks. Turkmens have joint claims to a great number of literary works written in Old Oghuz and Persian (by Seljuks in 11–12th centuries) languages with other people of the Oghuz Turkic origin, mainly of Azerbaijan and Turkey. These works include, but are not limited to the Book of Dede Korkut, Zöhre Tahyr, Gorogly, Layla and Majnun, Yusuf Zulaikha and others.

There is general consensus, however, that distinctively modern Turkmen literature originated in the 18th century with the poetry of Magtymguly Pyragy, who is considered the father of the Turkmen literature. Other prominent Turkmen poets of that era are Döwletmämmet Azady (Magtymguly's father), Mollanepes, Nurmuhammet Andalyp, Mämmetweli Kemine, Abdylla Şabende, Şeýdaýy, Mahmyt Gaýyby and Gurbanally Magrupy.

== Vocabulary ==
=== Numbers ===
| Number | Turkmen | Number | Turkmen |
|---|---|---|---|
| 0 | nol | 10 | on |
| 1 | bir | 20 | ýigrim |
| 2 | iki | 30 | otuz |
| 3 | üç | 40 | kyrk |
| 4 | dört | 50 | elli |
| 5 | bäş | 60 | altmyş |
| 6 | alty | 70 | ýetmiş |
| 7 | ýedi | 80 | segsen |
| 8 | sekiz | 90 | togsan |
| 9 | dokuz | 100 | ýüz |
| | | 1000 | müň |

Note: Numbers are formed identically to other Turkic languages, such as Turkish. So, eleven (11) is "on bir" (lit. 'ten-one'). Two thousand seventeen (2017) is iki müň on ýedi (two-thousand-ten-seven).

=== Colors ===
| English | Turkmen |
|---|---|
| black | gara |
| blue | gök |
| brown | goňur, mele |
| grey | çal |
| green | ýaşyl |
| orange | narynç, mämişi |
| pink | gülgün |
| purple | benewşe, melewşe |
| red | gyzyl |
| white | ak |
| yellow | sary |

=== Basic expressions ===
| English | Turkmen |
|---|---|
| yes | hawa |
| no | ýok |
| goodbye | sag boluň, hoş galyň |
| good morning | ertiriňiz haýyrly bolsun, ertiriňiz haýyr |
| good evening | agşamyňyz haýyrly bolsun, agşamyňyz haýyr |
| good night | gijäňiz rahat bolsun |
| please | haýyş, -aý/-äý (Note: -aý/-äý are verb suffixes, which can be seen in "Maňa beräý!" (please give it to me).) |
| thank you | sag boluň, sagbol |
| Do you speak English? | Siz iňlisçe gürläp bilýärsiňizmi? |
| I don't speak Turkmen | Men türkmençe gürlemeýärin |
| What does it mean? | Bu nämäni aňladýar?, Ol näme diýmek? |

== Example ==
The following is Magtymguly's Türkmeniň (of the Turkmen) poem with the text transliterated into Turkmen (Latin) letters, whereas the original language is preserved. Second column is the poem's Turkish translation, third one is the Azerbaijani translation, while the last one is the English translation.

Turkmen
Turkish
Azerbaijani
English

Jeýhun bilen bahry-Hazar arasy,
Çöl üstünden öwser ýeli türkmeniň;
Gül-gunçasy – gara gözüm garasy,
Gara dagdan iner sili türkmeniň.

Ceyhun ile Bahr-ı Hazar arası,
Çöl üstünden eser yeli Türkmen'in.
Gül goncası kara gözüm karası,
Kara dağdan iner seli Türkmen'in.

Ceyhun ilə Bəhri-Xəzər arası,
Çöl üstündən əsər yeli türkmənin.
Gül qönçəsi qara gözüm qarası,
Qara dağdan enər seli türkmənin.

Between the Jeyhun and the Khazar sea,
Over the desert blows the breeze of the Turkmen.
Its rose-bud is the pupil of my black eye
From the dark mountain descends the river of the Turkmen.

Hak sylamyş bardyr onuň saýasy,
Çyrpynşar çölünde neri, maýasy,
Reňbe-reň gül açar ýaşyl ýaýlasy,
Gark bolmuş reýhana çöli türkmeniň.

Hak sıylamış vardır onun sayesi,
Çırpınışır çölünde eri, dişisi.
Rengarenk gül açar yeşil yaylası,
Gark olmuş reyhana çölü Türkmen'in.

Haqq saya salmış, vardır onun sayəsi,
Çırpınışar çölündə əri, dişisi.
Rəngbərəng gül açar yaşıl yaylası,
Qərq olmuş reyhana çölü türkmənin.

The Lord has exalted him and placed him under His protection.
His camels, his flocks range over the desert,
Flowers of many hues open on his green summer pastures,
Drenched in the scent of basil the desert of the Turkmen.

Al-ýaşyl bürenip çykar perisi,
Kükeýip bark urar anbaryň ysy,
Beg, töre, aksakal ýurduň eýesi,
Küren tutar gözel ili türkmeniň.

Al yeşil bürünüp çıkar perisi
Kükeyip bark vurup amberin isi,
Bey, töre, aksakal yurdun iyesi,
Küren tutar güzel ili Türkmen'in.

Al-yaşıl bürünüb çıxar pərisi,
Qoxub bərq vurar ənbərin iy(is)i,
Bəy, törə, ağsaqqal yurdun yiyəsi,
Kürən tutar gözəl eli türkmənin.

His fairy-maids go forth clad in red and green,
From them wafts the scent of ambergris,
Bek, prince and the elder are the lords of the country,
Together they uphold the beautiful land of the Turkmen.

Ol merdiň ogludyr, mertdir pederi,
Görogly gardaşy, serhoşdyr seri,
Dagda, düzde kowsa, saýýatlar, diri
Ala bilmez, ýolbars ogly türkmeniň.

O merdin oğludur, merttir pederi,
Köroğlu kardeşi, sarhoştur seri,
Dağda, düzde kovsa avcılar diri
Alamaz arslan oğlu Türkmen'in.

O mərdin oğludur, mərddir pədəri,
Koroğlu qardaşı, sərxoşdur səri,
Dağda, düzdə qovsa səyyadlar (ovçular) diri,
Ala bilməz arslan oğlu türkmənin.

He is the son of a hero – a hero his father,
Göroghli his brother, drunken his head,
Should they pursue him on mountain or plain,
The hunters cannot take him alive, this panther's son is the Turkmen

Köňüller, ýürekler bir bolup başlar,
Tartsa ýygyn, erär topraklar-daşlar,
Bir suprada taýýar kylynsa aşlar,
Göteriler ol ykbaly türkmeniň.

Gönüller, yürekler bir olup başlar,
Tartsa yığın erir topraklar, taşlar,
Bir sofrada hazır kılınsa aşlar,
Götürülür o ikbali Türkmen'in.

Könüllər, ürəklər bir olub başlar,
Dartsa, yığın əriyər topraqlar, daşlar,
Bir süfrədə hazır qılınsa aşlar,
Götürülər o iqbalı türkmənin.

Hearts, breasts and heads are at one,
When he holds a gathering earth and mountains crumble.
When food is prepared at one table,
Exalted is the destiny of the Turkmen

Köňül howalanar ata çykanda,
Daglar lagla döner gyýa bakanda,
Bal getirer, joşup derýa akanda,
Bent tutdurmaz, gelse sili türkmeniň.

Gönül havalanır ata çıkanda,
Dağlar la'le döner dönüp bakanda,
Bal getirir coşup derya akanda,
Bent vurdurmaz, gelse, seli Türkmen'in.

Könül havalanar ata çıxanda,
Dağlar lələ dönər qıyıb baxanda,
Bal gətirər coşub dərya axanda,
Bənd tutdurmaz, gəlsə seli türkmənin.

His heart rejoices as he mounts his horse,
At his glance the mountains turn to rubies,
The sea overflows, bringing him honey
It will not be contained when it comes, the river of the Turkmen.

Gapyl galmaz, döwüş güni har olmaz,
Gargyşa, nazara giriftar olmaz,
Bilbilden aýrylyp, solup, saralmaz,
Daýym anbar saçar güli türkmeniň.

Gafil kalmaz dövüş günü har olmaz,
Kargışa, nazara giriftar olmaz,
Bülbülden ayrılıp, solup sararmaz,
Daim amber saçar, gülü Türkmen'in.

Qafil qalmaz, döyüş günü xar olmaz,
Qarğışa, nəzərə giriftar olmaz,
Bülbüldən ayrılıb, solub saralmaz,
Daim ənbər saçar gülü türkmənin.

On the day of battle he is not caught unaware,
He is captured neither by curse nor evil eye,
It is not deprived of its nightingale, does not wilt or wither,
Always smelling of musk is the rose of the Turkmen.

Tireler gardaşdyr, urug ýarydyr,
Ykballar ters gelmez hakyň nurudyr,
Mertler ata çyksa, söweş sarydyr,
Ýow üstüne ýörär ýoly türkmeniň.

Tireler kardeştir, uruk yaridir,
Ikballer ters gelmez, Hakk'ın nurudur,
Mertler ata çıksa savaş yarıdır,
Yağı üstüne yürür yolu Türkmen'in.

Tirələr qardaşdır, uruq yarıdır,
İqballar tərs gəlməz, Haqqın nurudur,
Mərdlər ata çıxsa, savaşdan sarıdır,
Yağı üstünə yeriyər yolu türkmənin.

The tribes are brothers, clans are good friends,
Fate does not oppose him, he is the God's light
When heroes mount their horses, facing the battle,
Toward the foe goes the road of the Turkmen

Serhoş bolup çykar, jiger daglanmaz,
Daşlary syndyrar, ýoly baglanmaz,
Gözüm gaýra düşmez köňül eglenmez,
Magtymguly – sözlär tili türkmeniň.

Sarhoş olup çıkar ciğer dağlanmaz,
Taşları parçalar, yolu bağlanmaz,
Gözüm gayre düşmez, gönül eğlenmez,
Mahtumkulu söyler dili Türkmen'in.

Sərxoş olub çıxar, ciyər dağlanmaz,
Daşları sındırar, yolu bağlanmaz,
Gözüm qeyrə düşməz, könül əylənməz,
Məxdumqulu söylər dilin türkmənin.

He sets out in high spirits, sorrow feels not,
He smashes through rocks, his way is not blocked
My eyes alight on none else, nor will my heart rejoice elsewhere,
Magtymguly speaks in the tongue of the Turkmen.

== Turkmen in Iran ==
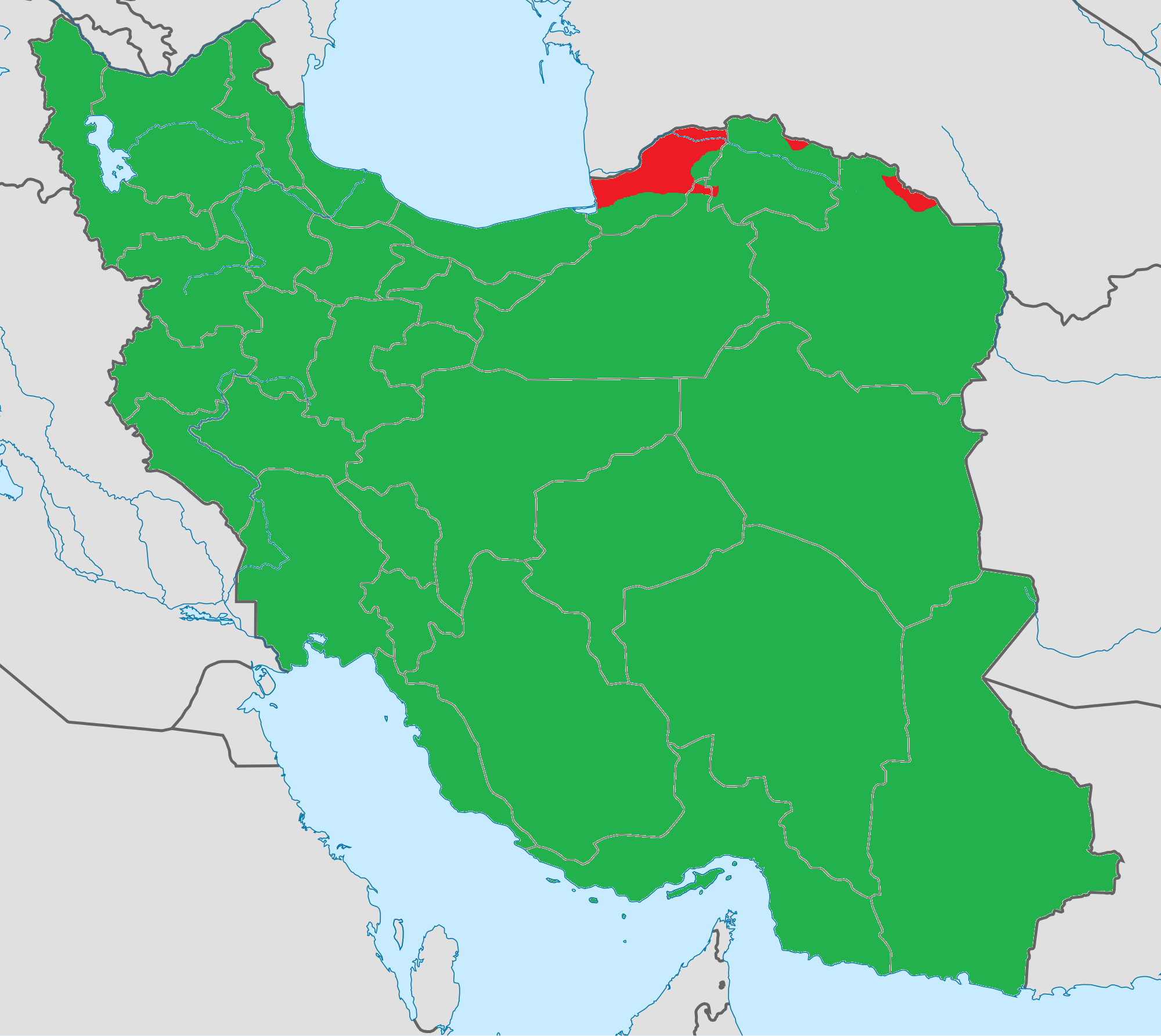
Approximate boundaries of Turkmen Sahra (in red), the rest of Iran (in green)

Irani Turkmens speak a dialect of Turkmen in the province of Golestan. It is mutually intelligible with the Turkmen dialects in Afghanistan, and is written in the Nastaliq script.
