= Turkmens =

Turkic ethnic group

Türkmenler Түркменлер توركمنلر
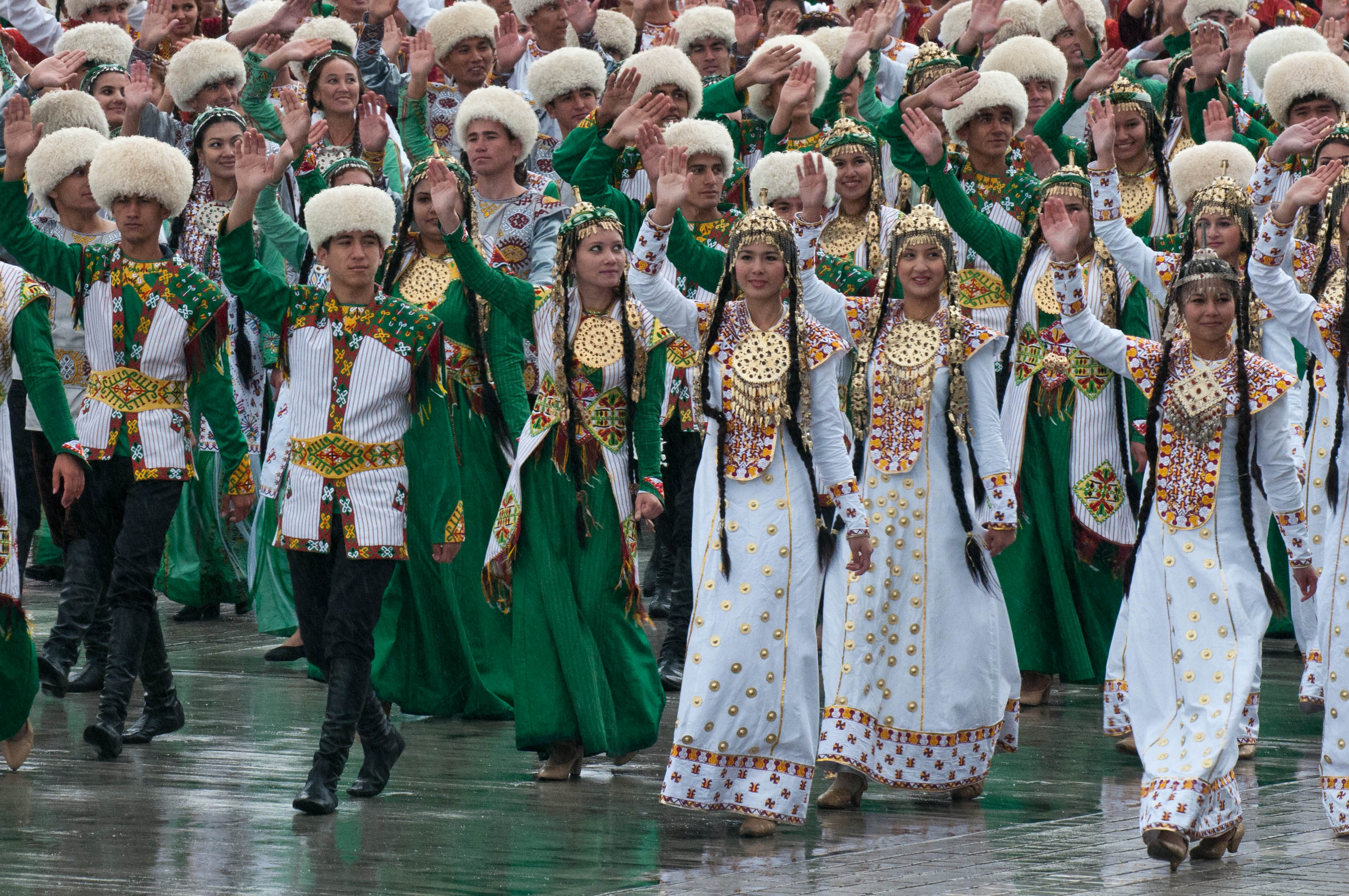
- Turkmens in folk costume at the 20th Independence Day parade, 2011

Total population
- c. 9 million

Regions with significant populations
- Turkmenistan: 5,500,000p (2022 census)
- Iran: c. 1 million
- Afghanistan: c. 1 million
- Uzbekistan: 194,076 (2026)
- Pakistan: 171,000
- Turkey: 113,762 (2024)
- Russia: 41,328 (2021 census)
- Tajikistan: 15,171 (2010 census)
- Belarus: 5,231 (2019 census)

Languages
- Turkmen

Religion
- Predominantly Sunni Islam

Related ethnic groups
- Other Turkic peoples Especially Azerbaijanis, Turkish people, and Khorasani Turks

Turkmens (Turkmen: Türkmenler, Түркменлер, توركمنلر, [tʏɾkmønˈløɾ]) are a Turkic ethnic group native to Central Asia, living mainly in Turkmenistan, northern and northeastern regions of Iran and north-western Afghanistan. Sizeable groups of Turkmens are found also in Uzbekistan, Kazakhstan, and the North Caucasus (Stavropol Krai). They speak the Turkmen language, which is classified as a part of the Eastern Oghuz branch of the Turkic languages.

In the early Middle Ages, Turkmens called themselves Oghuz; in the Middle Ages, they took the ethnonym Turkmen. These early Oghuz Turkmens moved westward from the Altai Mountains through the Siberian steppes, and settled in the region now known as Turkmenistan. Further westward migration of the Turkmen tribes from the territory of modern Turkmenistan and the rest of Central Asia started from the 11th century and continued until the 18th century. These Turkmen tribes played a significant role in the ethnic formation of peoples who would be known today as Anatolian Turks, Turkmens of Iraq, and Syria, as well as the Turkic population of Iran and Azerbaijan. To preserve their independence, those tribes that remained in Turkmenistan were united in military alliances, although remnants of tribal relations remained until the 20th century. Their traditional occupations were farming, cattle breeding, and various crafts. Ancient samples of applied art (primarily carpets and jewelry) indicate a high level of folk art culture.

The Seljuks, Khwarazmians, Qara Qoyunlu, Aq Qoyunlu, Ottomans, and Afsharids are also believed to descend from the Turkmen tribes of Qiniq, Begdili, Yiwa, Bayandur, Kayi, and Afshar respectively.

== Etymology ==
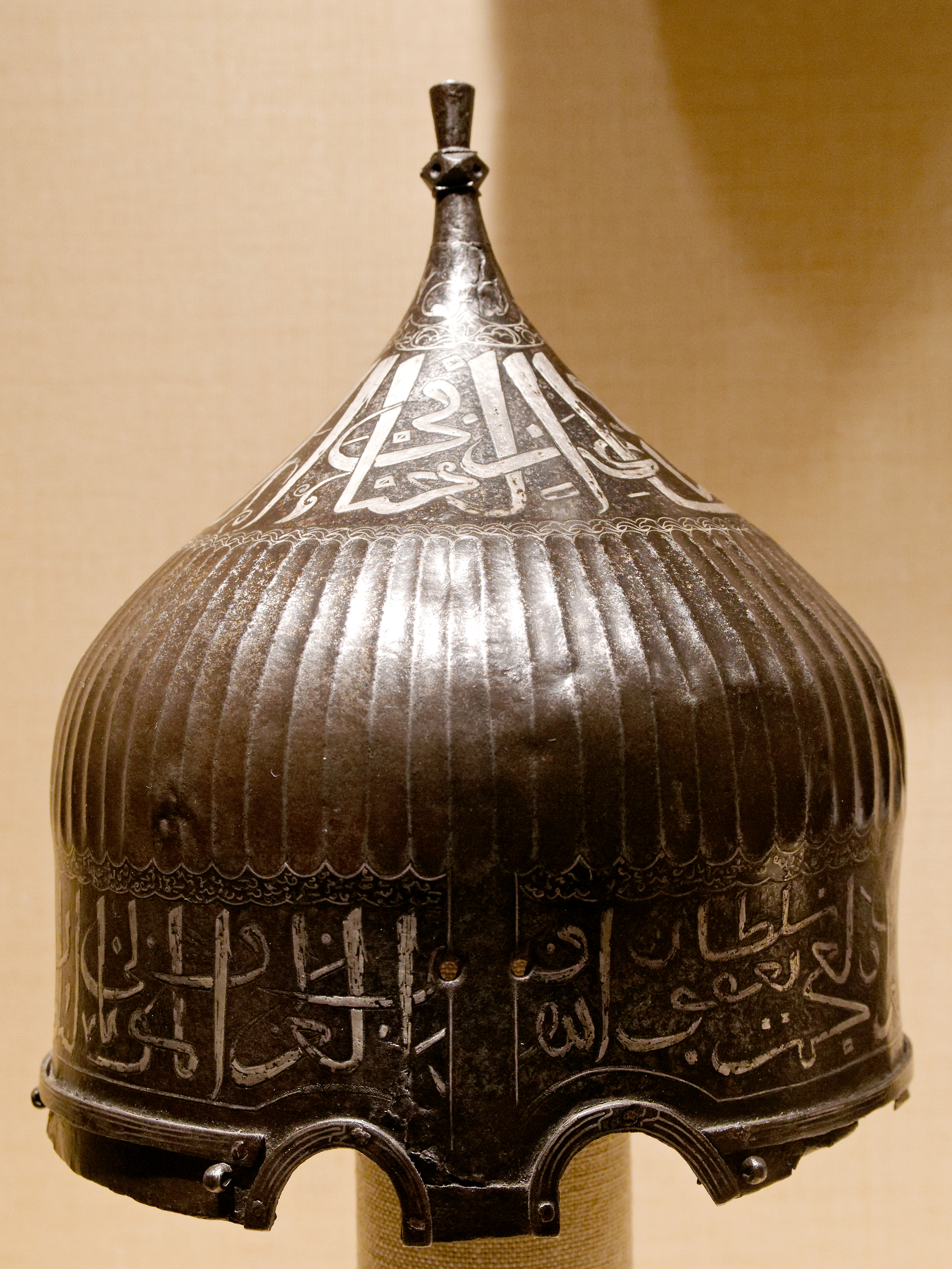
Helmet of Ya'qub Beg, ruler of the Turkoman Aq Qoyunlu state (15th century)

The term Turkmen is generally applied to the Turkic tribes that have been distributed across the Near and Middle East, as well as Central Asia, from the 11th century to modern times. Originally, all Turkic tribes who belonged to the Turkic dynastic mythological system and/or converted to Islam (e.g. Karluks, Oghuz Turks, Khalajs, Kanglys, Kipchaks, etc.) were designated "Turkmens". Only later did this word come to refer to a specific ethnonym. The generally accepted view for the etymology of the name is that it comes from Türk and the Turkic emphasizing suffix -men, meaning "'most Turkish of the Turks' or 'pure-blooded Turks.'" A folk etymology, dating back to the Middle Ages and found in the works of al-Biruni and Mahmud al-Kashghari, instead derives the suffix -men from the Persian suffix -mānand, with the resulting word meaning "like a Turk". While formerly the dominant etymology in modern scholarship, this mixed Turkic-Persian derivation is now typically viewed as incorrect. An alternative etymology was proposed by 16th-century Ottoman historian Mehmed Neşri, who derived it from the Persian phrase Turk-i iman (ترک ایمان), meaning "Turk of the faith" (i.e. Islam). This theory was rejected as incorrect by turkologist Ármin Vámbéry, who argued that it relied upon an incorrect understanding of Persian grammar:

[It] does not do [one] well to accept the pious Muhammadan etymology of Neshri, who, in spite of being one of the earliest Ottoman writers, has but very little notion of the true spirit of the Turkish language. For, even in his day, the word Turk was analogous to raw, uncultured, just as the word Oguz, from which came oguzane (boorish, thick-headed), and oguzluk (coarseness). Neshri's etymology is entirely based upon Muhammadan devotional feeling, and is quite a linguistic impossibility. Turk [and] iman are two separate nouns, which cannot be composed by an ezafet. We can say, for example, din-i-ingiliz or iman-i-turk (the faith of the English, or the faith of the Turks), but not ingiliz-i-din or turk-i-iman. Finally, it must not be forgotten that the name the Nomads themselves adopt is Turkmen, and Turkman is applied to them only by the Persians.

Despite various criticisms, it remains a theory advocated by some today, such as linguist and ethnographer Dávid Somfai. Former president of Turkmenistan Saparmurad Niyazov was also among the advocates of this etymology, although he altered the meaning of the words, writing in his Ruhnama that, rather than "Muslim Turk", it meant "made of light":

[The Turkmen people were given] the following general name: Turk Iman. turk means core, iman means light. Therefore, Turk Iman, namely Turkmen, means "made from light, whose essence is light."

Today, the terms Turkmen and Turkoman are usually restricted to two Turkic groups: the Turkmen people of Turkmenistan and adjacent parts of Central Asia and Iran, and the Turkomans of Iraq and Syria.

== Origins ==
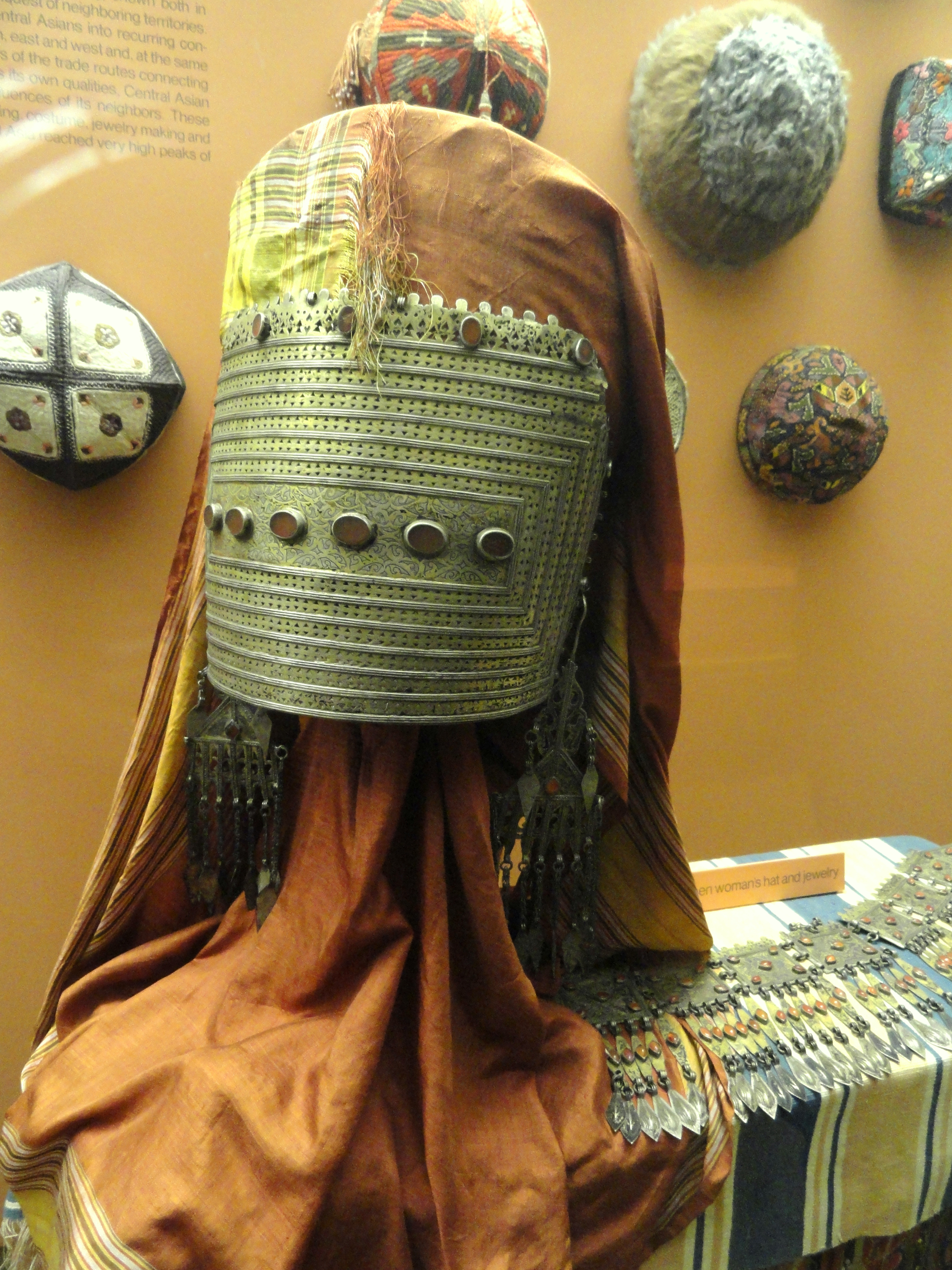
Turkmen women's headwear and jewelry

Türkmens were mentioned near the end of the 10th century A.D in Islamic literature by the Arab geographer al-Muqaddasi in Ahsan Al-Taqasim Fi Ma'rifat Al-Aqalim. In his work, which was completed in 987 A.D, al-Muqaddasi writes about Turkmens twice while depicting the region as the frontier of the Muslim possessions in Central Asia.

Earlier references to Türkmen might be trwkkmˀn (if not trkwmˀn "translator"), mentioned in an 8th-century Sogdian letter and 特拘夢 Tejumeng (< MC ZS *dək̚-kɨo-mɨuŋ^{H}), another name of Sogdia, besides Suyi 粟弋 and Sute 粟特, according to the Chinese encyclopedia Tongdian. However, even if 特拘夢 might have transcribed Türkmen, these "Türkmens" might be Karluks instead of modern Türkmens' Oghuz-speaking ancestors; as Türkmen might be the Karluks' equivalent of the Göktürks' political term Kök Türk. Zuev (1960) links the tribal name 餘沒渾 Yumeihun (< MC *iʷо-muət-хuən) in Tang Huiyao to the name Yomut of a modern Turkmen clan.

Towards the end of the 11th century, in Divânü Lügat'it-Türk (Compendium of the Turkic Dialects), Mahmud Kashgari uses "Türkmen" synonymously with "Oğuz". He describes Oghuz as a Turkic tribe and says that Oghuz and Karluks were both known as Turkmens.

The origins of the Turkic peoples has been a topic of much discussion, but evidence points either to a homeland in South Central Siberia, close to the Altai Mountains and Lake Baikal or farther East in Mongolia. Archaeogenetic, historical and linguistic evidence suggests that the earliest Turkic peoples were "within or close to the Northeast Asian genepool" but made up of multiple heterogeneous groups, with their exact location of their homeland remaining disputed. The genetic and historical evidence suggests that the early Turkic peoples, including the ancestors of the Turkmen people - Oghuz Turks, harbored both West-Eurasian and Northeast Asian ancestry and were located in and around the Altai region and western Mongolia. Later medieval Turkic groups exhibited a wide range of both West-Eurasian and East Asian physical appearances and genetic origins, in part through long-term contact with neighboring Iranian and Mongolic peoples.

Before the formation of the Turkmen ethnicity, the Oghuz Turks inhabited parts of Transoxiana, the western portion of Turkestan, a region that largely corresponds to much of Central Asia as far east as Xinjiang. Famous historian and ruler of Khwarazm of the XVII century Abu al-Ghazi Bahadur links the origin of all Turkmens to 24 Oghuz tribes in his literary work "Genealogy of the Turkmens". In Byzantine, then in the European sources and later in the American tradition, Turkmens were called Turkomans, in the countries of the Near and Middle East - Turkmens, as well as Torkaman, Terekeme; in Kievan Rus - Torkmens; in the Duchy of Moscow - Taurmen; and in the Tsarist Russia - Turkoman and Trukhmen.

In the 7th century AD, Oghuz tribes had moved westward from the Altai Mountains through the Siberian steppes, and settled in this region. They also penetrated as far west as the Volga basin and the Balkans. These early Turkmens are believed to have mixed with native Sogdian peoples and lived as pastoral nomads until being conquered by the Russians in the 19th century.

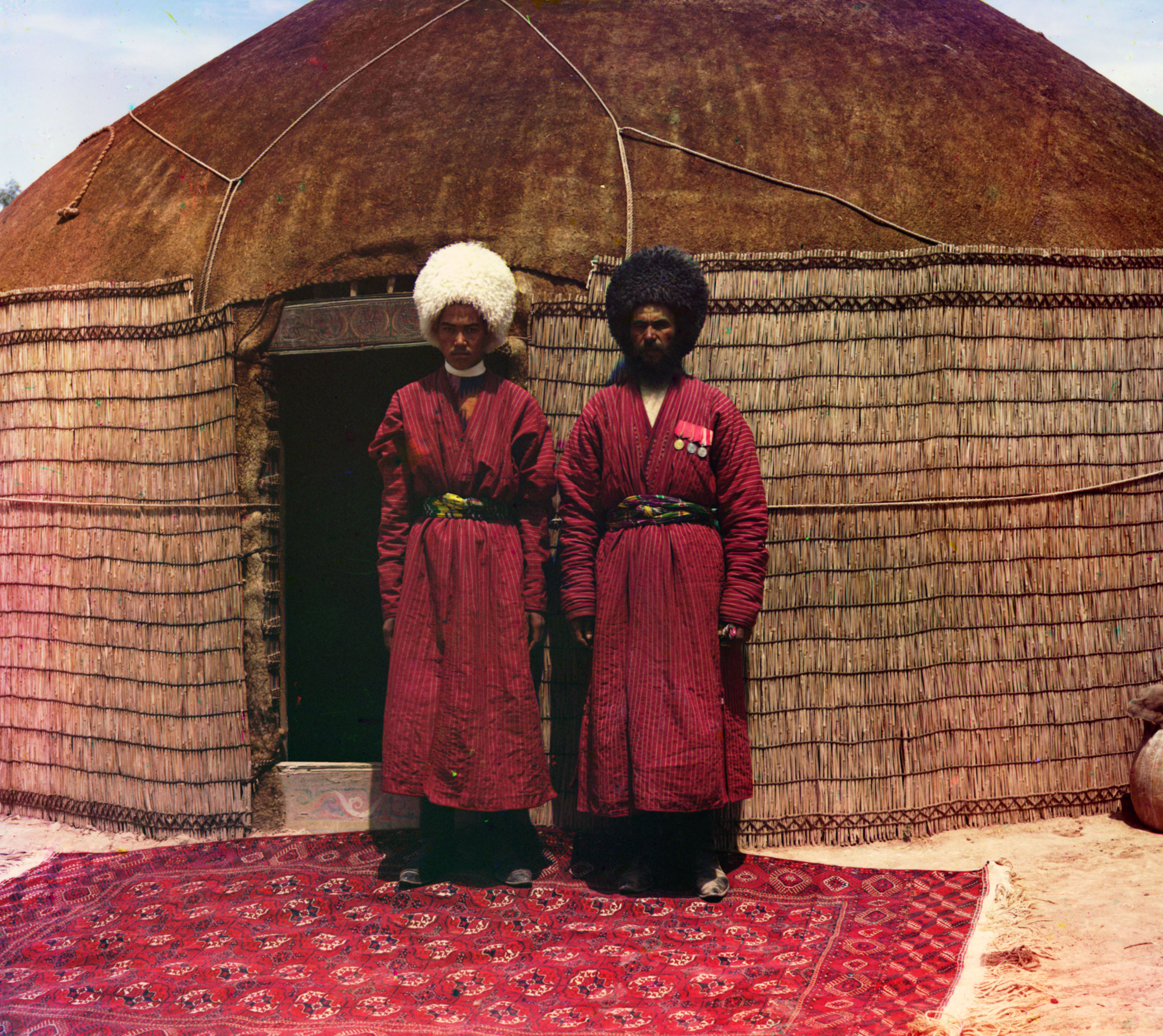
Two Turkmen men standing on a carpet in front of a yurt. Photo by Prokudin-Gorsky between 1905 and 1915

Migration of the Turkmen tribes from the territory of Turkmenistan and the rest of Central Asia in the south-west direction began mainly from the 11th century and continued until the 18th century. These Turkmen tribes played a significant role in the ethnic formation of such peoples as Anatolian Turks, Turkmens of Iraq and Syria, as well as the Turkic population of Iran and Azerbaijan. To preserve their independence, those tribes that remained in Turkmenistan were united in military alliances, although remnants of tribal relations remained until the 20th century. Their traditional occupations were farming, cattle breeding, and various crafts. Ancient samples of applied art (primarily carpets and jewelry) indicate a high level of folk art culture.

== Genetics ==
Haplogroup Q-M242 is commonly found in Siberia, Southeast Asia, Central Asia. This haplogroup forms a large percentage of the paternal lineages of Turkmens.

Grugni et al. (2012) found Q-M242 in 42.6% (29/68) of a sample of Turkmens from Golestan, Iran. Di Cristofaro et al. (2013) found Q-M25 in 31.1% (23/74) and Q-M346 in 2.7% (2/74) for a total of 33.8% (25/74) Q-M242 in a sample of Turkmens from Jawzjan. Karafet et al. (2018) found Q-M25 in 50.0% (22/44) of another sample of Turkmens from Turkmenistan. Haplogroup Q has seen its highest frequencies in the Turkmens from Karakalpakstan (mainly Yomut) at 73%.

Among Turkmens overall, haplogroup R1b has a frequency of 36.7%, haplogroup J 23.8%, and R1a 6.7%.

Haplogroup Q is very rare among Turkmens of Stavropol Krai (tribes Choudor, Igdyr, Suyunadjy), where it reaches only 2%. Suyunadjy tribe makes up 53% of all Stavropol Turkmen; among them the frequency of R1a reaches 82%.

A genetic study on maternal mitochondrial DNA (mtDNA) haplogroups of a Turkmen sample describes a mixture of mostly West Eurasian maternal lineages and a minority of East Eurasian lineages. Turkmens also have two unusual mtDNA markers with polymorphic characteristics, only found in Turkmens and southern Siberians.

== History ==
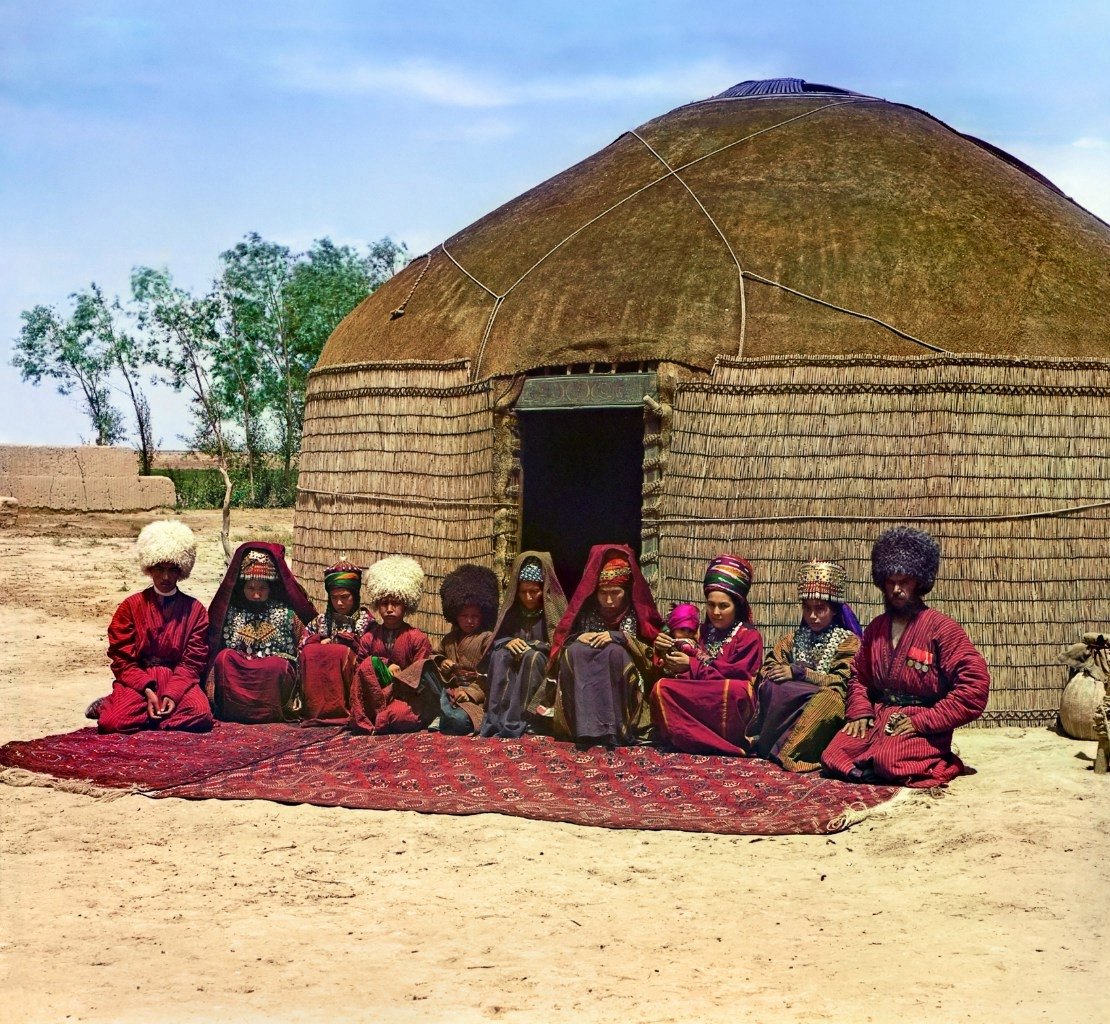
Teke Turkmen family in traditional clothing near Bairam-Ali. Photo taken by Sergey Prokudin-Gorsky between 1903 and 1916

Turkmens belong to the Oghuz tribes, who originated on the periphery of Central Asia and founded gigantic empires beginning from the 3rd millennium BC. Subsequently, Turkmen tribes founded lasting dynasties in Central Asia, Middle East, Persia and Anatolia that had a profound influence on the course of history of those regions. The most prominent of those dynasties were the Ghaznavids, Seljuks, Ottomans, Afsharids and Qajars. Representatives of the Turkmen tribes of Ive and Bayandur were also the founders of the short-lived, but formidable states of Kara Koyunlu and Ak Koyunlu Turkmens respectively.

Turkmens that stayed in Central Asia largely survived unaffected by the Mongol period due to their semi-nomadic lifestyle and became traders along the Caspian, which led to contacts with Eastern Europe. Following the decline of the Mongols, Tamerlane conquered the area and his Timurid Empire would rule, until it too fractured, as the Safavids, Khanate of Bukhara, and Khanate of Khiva all contested the area. The expanding Russian Empire took notice of Turkmenistan's extensive cotton industry, during the reign of Peter the Great, and invaded the area. Following the decisive Battle of Geok Tepe in January 1881, the bulk of Turkmen tribes found themselves under the rule of the Russian Emperor, which was formalized in the Akhal Treaty between Russia and Persia. After the Russian Revolution, Soviet control was established by 1921, and in 1924 Turkmenistan became the Turkmen Soviet Socialist Republic. Turkmenistan gained independence in 1991.

== Culture and society ==
=== Religion ===
Mosque in the city of Mary

The Turkmen of Turkmenistan, like their kin in Uzbekistan, Afghanistan, and Iran are predominantly Muslims. According the U.S. Department of State's International Religious Freedom Report for 2019,

According to U.S. government estimates, the country is 89 percent Muslim (mostly Sunni), 9 percent Eastern Orthodox, and 2 percent other. There are small communities of Jehovah's Witnesses, Shia Muslims, Baha'is, Roman Catholics, the International Society for Krishna Consciousness, and evangelical Christians, including Baptists and Pentecostals. Most ethnic Russians and Armenians identify as Orthodox Christian and generally are members of the Russian Orthodox Church or Armenian Apostolic Church. Some ethnic Russians and Armenians are also members of smaller Protestant groups. There are small pockets of Shia Muslims, consisting largely of ethnic Iranians, Azeris, and Kurds, some located in Ashgabat, with others along the border with Iran and in the western city of Turkmenbashy.

The Turkmen adopted Islam between the 12th and 14th centuries. Sufi orders like the Yasawiya and Kubrawiya greatly contributed to the conversion of the Turkmens to Islam.

The great majority of Turkmen readily identify themselves as Muslims and acknowledge Islam as an integral part of their cultural heritage. The country of Turkmenistan encourages the conceptualization of "Turkmen Islam", or worship that is often mixed with veneration of elders and saints, life-cycle rituals, and Sufi practices.

Since Turkmenistan's independence saw an increase in religious practices and the development of institutions like the Muftiate and the building of mosques, today it is often regulated.

The government leadership of Turkmenistan often uses Islam to legitimize its role in society by sponsoring holiday celebrations such as iftar dinners during Ramadan and presidential pilgrimage to Mecca, Saudi Arabia. This sponsorship has validated the country's two presidents (Nyýazow and Berdimuhamedow) as pious Turkmen, giving them an aura of cultural authority.

The Russian Academy of Sciences has identified many instances of syncretic influence of pre-Islamic Turkic belief systems on practice of Islam among Turkmen, including placing offerings before trees. The Turkmen word taňry, meaning "God", derives from the Turkic Tengri, the name of the supreme god in the pre-Islamic Turkic pantheon. The Turkmen language features a multitude of euphemisms for "wolf", because of a belief that speaking the actual word while tending a flock of sheep will invoke a wolf's appearance. In other examples of syncretism, some infertile Turkmen women, rather than praying, step or jump over a live wolf in order to assist them in getting pregnant, and children born subsequently are typically given names associated with wolves; alternatively the mother may visit shrines of Muslim saints. The future is divined by reading of dried camel dung by special fortune tellers.

=== Language ===
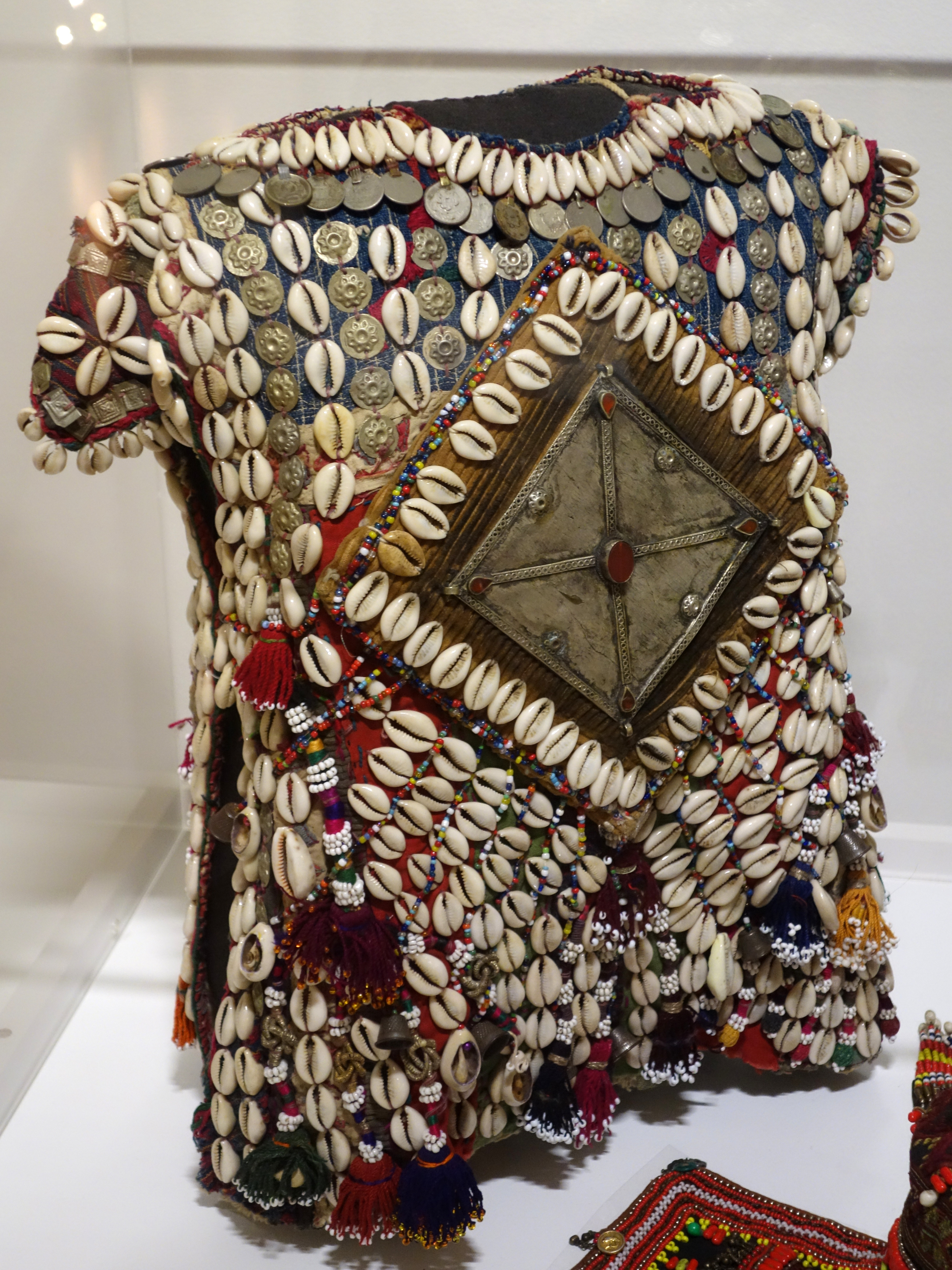
Turkmen child's tunic, early to mid 20th century, Textile Museum of Canada

Turkmen (Turkmen: Türkmençe, Түркменче, تۆرکمنچه) is a Turkic language spoken by the Turkmens of Central Asia, mainly of Turkmenistan, Iran, and Afghanistan. It has an estimated five million native speakers in Turkmenistan, a further 719,000 speakers in Northeastern Iran and 1.5 million people in Northwestern Afghanistan.

The Turkmen language is closely related to Azerbaijani, Turkish, Gagauz, Qashqai, and Crimean Tatar, sharing common linguistic features with each of those languages. There is a high degree of mutual intelligibility between these languages. However, the closest language of Turkmen is considered Khorasani Turkic, spoken in northeastern regions of Iran and with which it shares the eastern subbranch of Oghuz languages, as well as Khorezm, the Oghuz dialect of Uzbek language spoken mainly along the Turkmenistan border.

The standardized form of Turkmen (spoken in Turkmenistan) is based on the Teke dialect, while Iranian Turkmen uses mostly the Yomud dialect, and Afghan Turkmen use the Ersary dialect.

In Iran, the Turkmen language comes second after the Azerbaijani language in terms of the number of speakers of Turkic languages of Iran.

=== Literature ===
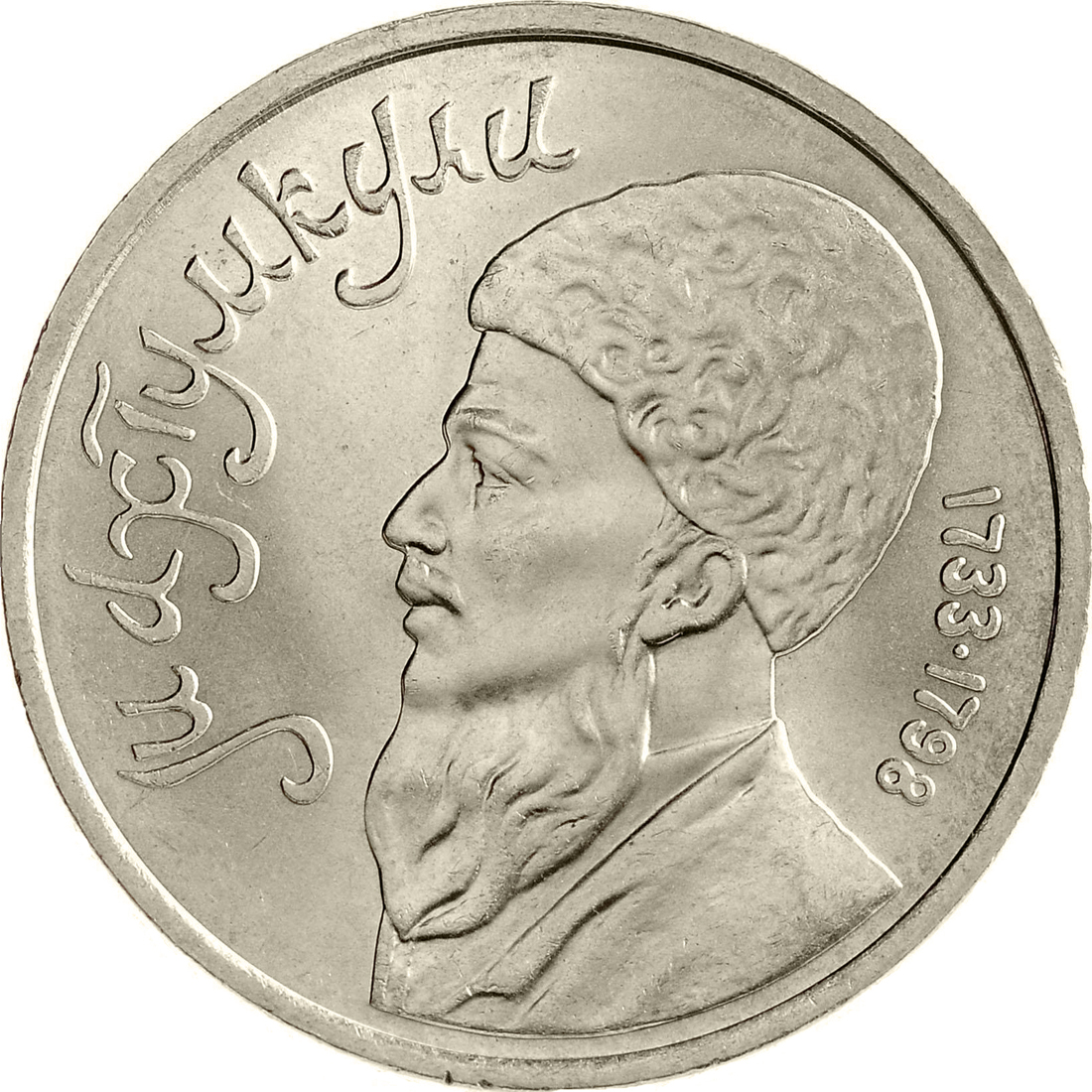
Magtymguly Pyragy on a Soviet rouble, 1991

Turkmen literature comprises oral compositions and written texts in old Oghuz Turkic and Turkmen languages. Turkmens have joint claims to a great number of literary works written in Old Oghuz Turkic and Persian (by Seljuks in 11-12th centuries) languages with other people of the Oghuz Turkic origin, mainly of Azerbaijan and Turkey. This works include, but are not limited to the Book of Dede Korkut, Gorogly and others. The medieval Turkmen literature was heavily influenced by Arabic and Persian, and used mostly Arabic alphabet.

There is general consensus, however, that distinctively Turkmen literature originated in 18th century with the poetry of Magtymguly Pyragy, who is considered the father of the Turkmen literature. Other prominent Turkmen poets of that era are Döwletmämmet Azady (Magtymguly's father), Nurmuhammet Andalyp, Abdylla Şabende, Şeýdaýy, Mahmyt Gaýyby and Gurbanally Magrupy.

In the 20th century, Turkmenistan's most prominent Turkmen-language writer was Berdi Kerbabayev, whose novel Decisive Step, later made into a motion picture directed by Alty Garlyyev, is considered the apotheosis of modern Turkmen fiction. It earned him the USSR State Prize for Literature in 1948.

=== Music ===
The musical art of the Turkmens is an integral part of the musical art of the Turkic peoples. The music of the Turkmen people is closely related to the Kyrgyz and Kazakh folk forms. Important musical traditions include traveling singers called bakshy, who sing with instruments such as the two-stringed lute called dutar.

Other important musical instruments are gopuz, tüydük, dombura, and gyjak. The most famous Turkmen bakshys are those who lived in the 19th century: Amangeldi Gönübek, Gulgeldi ussa, Garadali Gokleng, Yegen Oraz bakshy, Hajygolak, Nobatnyyaz bakshy, Oglan bakshy, Durdy bakshy, Shukur bakshy, Chowdur bakshy and others. Usually they narrated the woeful and gloomy events of the Turkmen history through their music. The names and music of these bakshys have become legendary among the Turkmen people, and passed orally from generation to generation.

The Central Asian classical music tradition muqam is also present in Turkmenistan. In the 20th century, Danatar Ovezov began composing classical music using Turkmen themes, and that classical expression of Turkmen motifs and melodies reached its apotheosis in the compositions of Nury Halmammedov.

=== Folk crafts ===
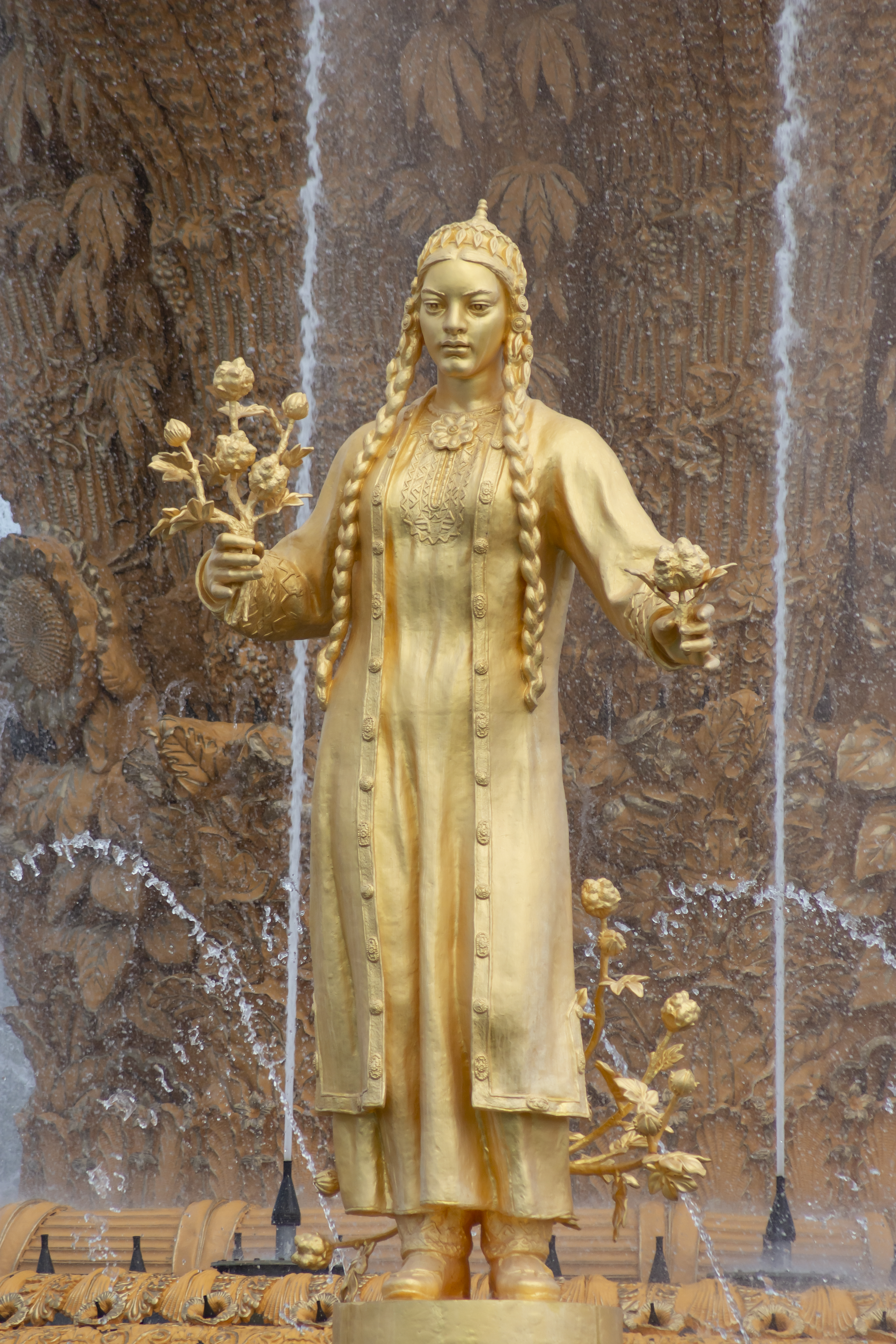
Sculpture of a girl in traditional Turkmen dress in All-Russia Exhibition Centre in Moscow, Russia

Embroidery

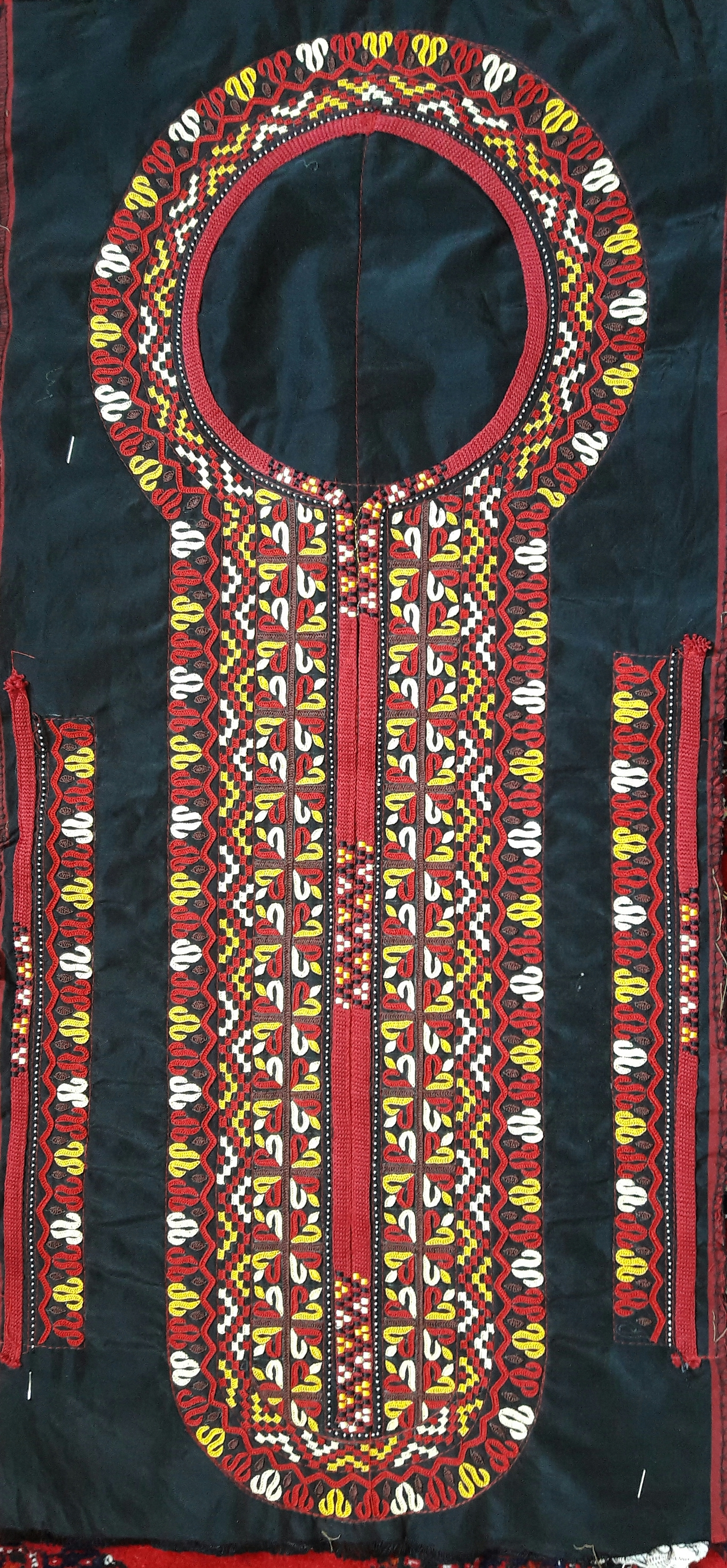
Traditional Turkmen embroidery for women's dress

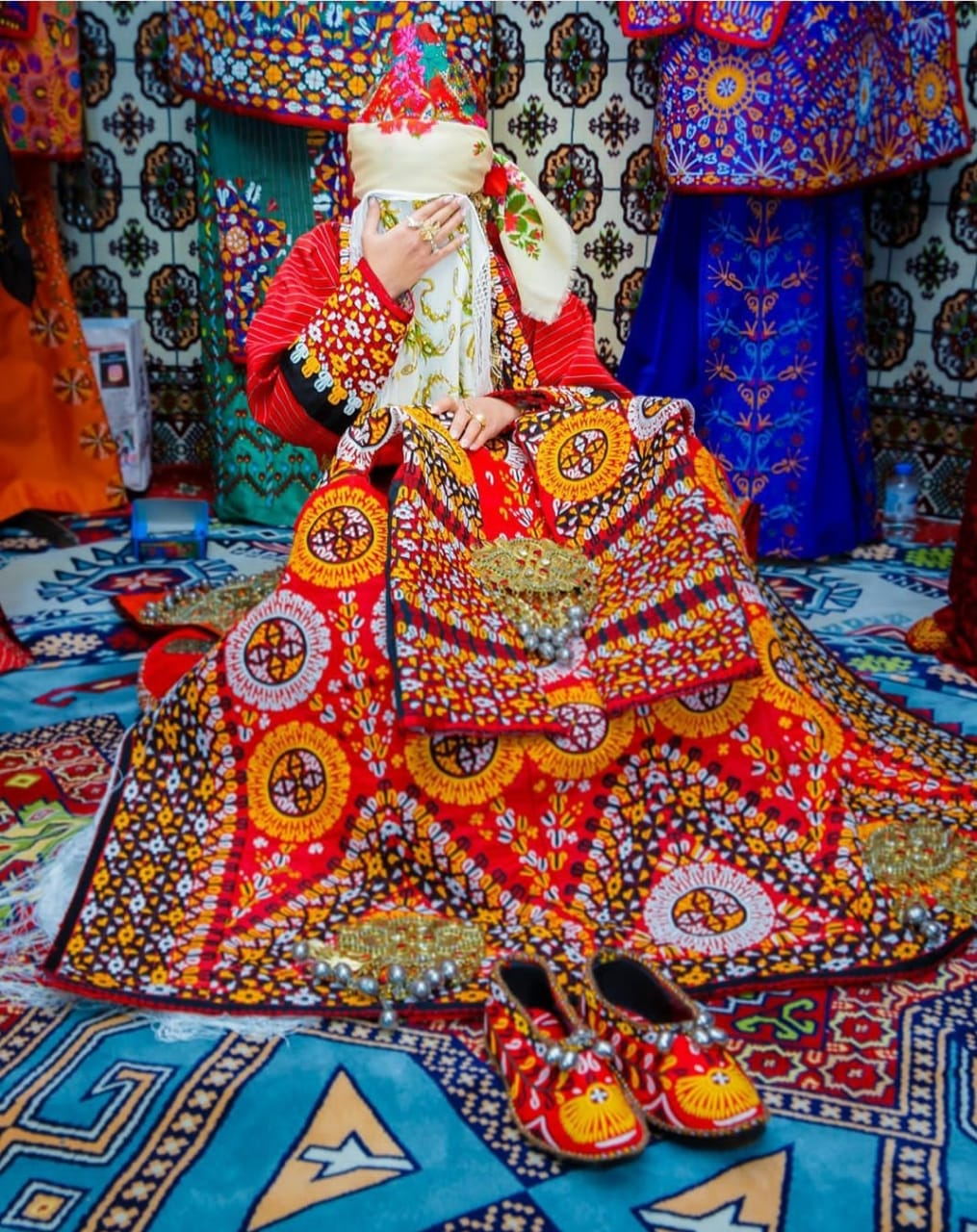
Turkmen woman in traditional bride's dress. Bride's face is covered during a certain ceremony

Turkmen pictorial embroidery became widespread in the Scythian period and reached great perfection in other periods. It is known that for a long time the Turkmens were engaged in the production of silk as the main material for embroidery, and Turkmen women and girls embroidered their dresses with colored silks. All these deeds are clearly expressed in the songs of Turkmen women and in the oral Turkmen literature.

The main materials for Turkmen embroidery are thread and fabric. There are several types of threads: natural threads such as silk and cotton threads; synthetic and acrylic threads. As for the types of fabrics, silk and woolen fabrics are usually used for embroidery.

It is customary for the Turkmens to embroider with colored silks girls' and men's skullcaps (tahya), collars and sleeves of women's dresses (and in more distant times, men's shirts), the lower part of pants protruding from under the dress, various small bags for storing small things.

Weaving

Weaving is one of the types of home craft that has its roots in the deep past. During excavations of many ancient and early medieval settlements on the territory of Turkmenistan, archaeologists discovered fragments of cotton and woolen fabrics, the analysis of which does not exclude local production: the warp and wefts (transverse threads) have the same thickness, the yarn is single, the weave is simple.

The techniques of weaving craft of Turkmen women are similar to homespun production of other peoples. First, there were three stages of preparation of different types of threads. To obtain cotton thread: 1) cleaning cotton from seeds using a small machine, loosening the resulting fiber with rods, rolling into small bunches; 2) spinning the fiber with a spinning wheel, twisting it into a thread and winding the threads into skeins; 3) winding the threads on the hook and bobbin. For woolen thread: 1) washing and drying wool, scuttling with twigs until a fluffy mass is obtained; 2) combing, loosening, yarn and twisting into a thread with a spindle, winding into skeins; 3) dyeing skeins. For silk thread: 1) cleaning and unwinding (sarmak) cocoons (goza) with a spinning wheel (parh), steaming in a boiler with boiling water; 2) fixing the threads on the spindle using a rotating spinning wheel, twisting the threads into one thread, rewinding them from the spindle into a ball, then into skeins; 3) dyeing skeins, drying in the sun.

Home weaving was extremely widespread throughout the territory of Turkmenistan. In almost every family, weaving skills were instilled in girls from an early age. They began to learn the art of making yarn, weaving and sewing from the age of 8–10. Fabrics, depending on the purpose, were divided into various types: for sewing women's and men's clothing, thin fabric for camel wool dressing gowns, for cotton tablecloths was highly valued. Bags for storing grain and flour were made of fabric of thick twisted yarn, narrow strong strips of fabric (5–12 cm) were used to fasten the poles to the yurt lattice. Using a simple technique of weaving, the craftswomen achieved a great effect in the manufacture of peculiar national fabrics, which cannot be reproduced in mechanical production: a loom consisting of 3-4 columns dug into the ground, a transverse roller, a heald. Tools made of wood in the form of a saber were used to seal the weft threads.

=== Cuisine ===
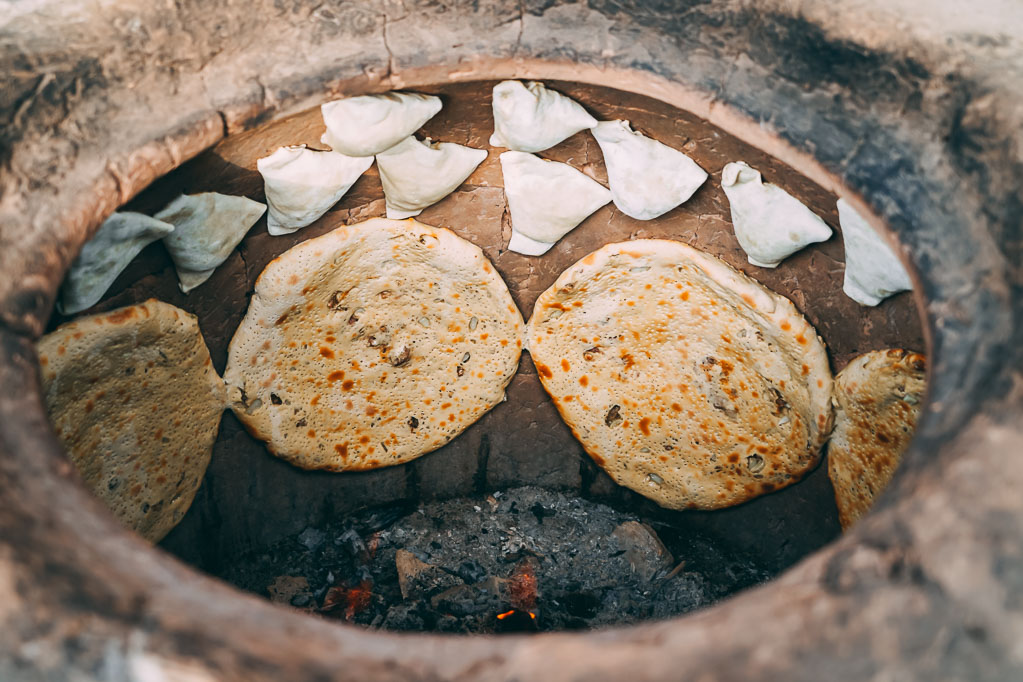
Baking çörek and somsa in the Turkmen tamdyr

Characteristics of traditional Turkmen cuisine are rooted in the largely nomadic nature of day-to-day life prior to the Soviet period coupled with a long local tradition, dating back millennia before the arrival of the Turkmen in the region, of white wheat production. Baked goods, especially flat bread (Turkmen: çörek) typically baked in a tandoor, make up a large proportion of the daily diet, along with cracked wheat porridge (Turkmen: ýarma), wheat puffs (Turkmen: pişme), and dumplings (Turkmen: börek). Since sheep-, goat-, and camel husbandry are traditional mainstays of nomadic Turkmen, mutton, goat meat, and camel meat were most commonly eaten, variously ground and stuffed in dumplings, boiled in soup, or grilled on spits in chunks (Turkmen: şaşlyk) or as fingers of ground, spiced meat (Turkmen: kebap). Rice for plov was reserved for festive occasions. Due to lack of refrigeration in nomad camps, dairy products from sheep-, goat-, and camel milk were fermented to keep them from spoiling quickly. Fish consumption was largely limited to tribes inhabiting the Caspian Sea shoreline. Fruits and vegetables were scarce, and in nomad camps limited mainly to carrots, squash, pumpkin, and onions. Inhabitants of oases enjoyed more varied diets, with access to pomegranate-, fig-, and stone fruit orchards; vineyards; and of course melons. Areas with cotton production could use cottonseed oil and sheep herders used fat from the fat-tailed sheep. The major traditional imported product was tea.

The Royal Geographical Society reported in 1882,

The food of the Tekkes [sic] consists of well-prepared pillaus and of game; also of fermented camels' milk, melons, and water-melons. They use their fingers in conveying food to their mouths, but guests are provided with spoons.

In sharp contrast to other Central Asian and Turkic ethnic groups, Turkmen do not eat horse meat, and in fact eating of horse meat is prohibited by law in Turkmenistan.

Conquest by the Russian Empire in the 1880s introduced new foods, including such meats as beef, pork, and chicken, as well as potatoes, tomatoes, cabbage, and cucumbers, though they did not find widespread use in most Turkmen households until the Soviet period. While now consumed widely, they are, strictly speaking, not considered "traditional".

=== Nomadic heritage ===
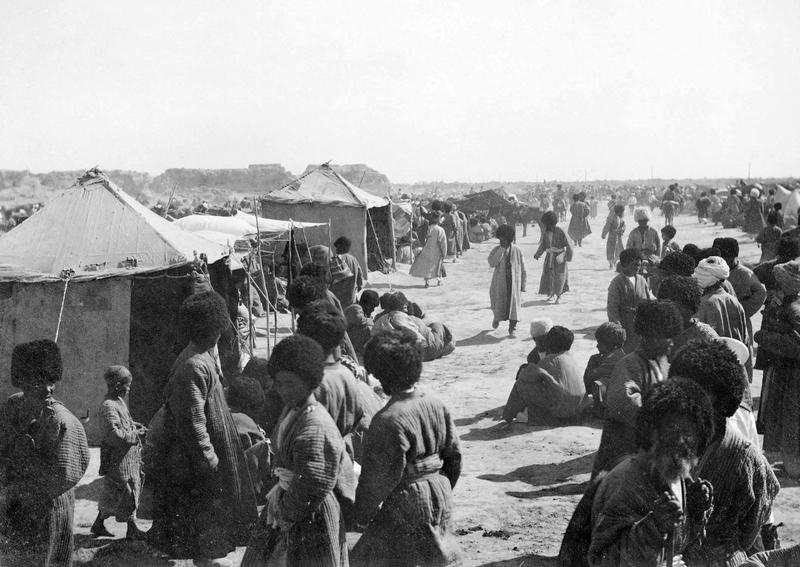
Turkmens in Merv in 1890

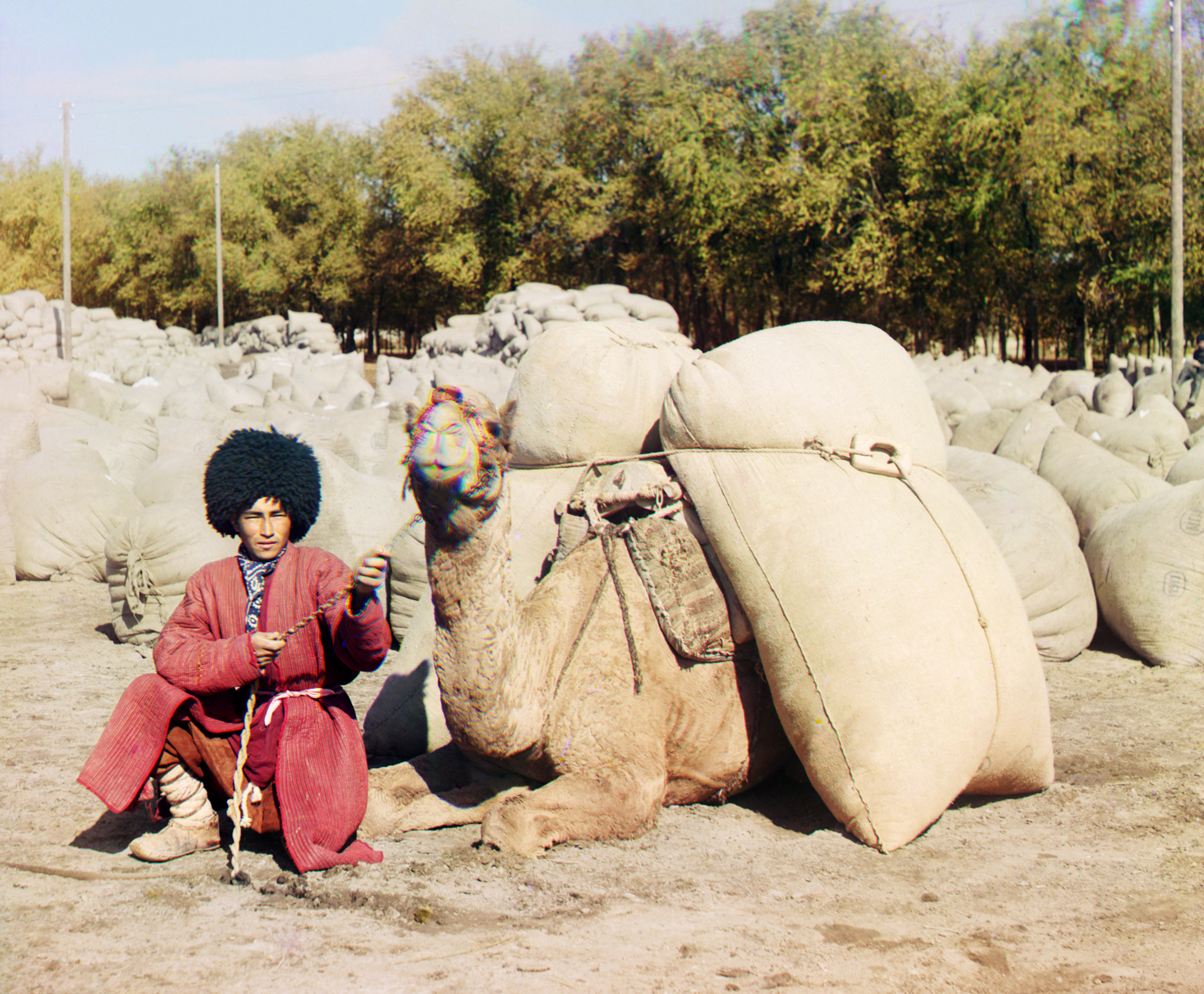
A Turkmen man of Central Asia in traditional clothes. Photo by Prokudin-Gorsky between 1905 and 1915

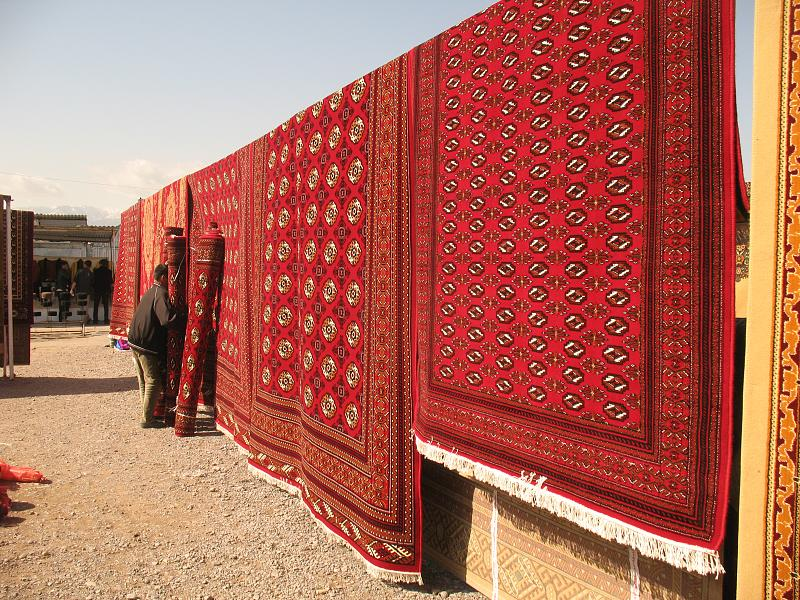
Turkmen carpets at the local bazaar, Ashgabat

Before the establishment of Soviet power in Central Asia, it was difficult to identify distinct ethnic groups in the region. Sub-ethnic and supra-ethnic loyalties were more important to people than ethnicity. When asked to identify themselves, most Central Asians would name their kin group, neighborhood, village, religion or the state in which they lived; the idea that a state should exist to serve an ethnic group was unknown. That said, most Turkmen could identify the tribe to which they belonged, though they might not identify themselves as Turkmen.

Most Turkmen were nomads until the 19th century when they began to settle the area south of the Amu Darya. Many Turkmen became semi-nomadic, herding sheep and camels during spring, summer, and fall, but planting crops, wintering in oasis camps, and harvesting the crops in the summer and autumn. As a rule they did not settle in cities and towns until the advent of the Soviet government. This mobile lifestyle precluded identification with anyone outside one's kin group and led to frequent conflicts between different Turkmen tribes, particularly regarding access to water.

In collaboration with the local nationalists, the Soviet government sought to transform the Turkmen and other similar ethnic groups in the USSR into modern socialist nations that based their identity on a fixed territory and a common language. Prior to the Battle of Geok Tepe in January 1881 and subsequent conquest of Merv in 1884, the Turkmen "retained the condition of predatory, horse-riding nomads, who were greatly feared by their neighbours as 'man-stealing Turks.' Until subjugated by the Russians, the Turkmens were a warlike people, who conquered their neighbours and regularly captured ethnic Persians for sale as slaves in Khiva. It was their boast that not one Persian had crossed their frontier except with a rope round his neck."

The Soviet-led standardization of the Turkmen language, education, and projects to promote ethnic Turkmen in industry, government and higher education led growing numbers of Turkmen to identify with a larger national Turkmen culture rather than with sub-national, pre-modern forms of identity. After gaining independence from the Soviet Union, Turkmen historians went to great lengths to prove that the Turkmen had inhabited their current territory since time immemorial; some historians even tried to deny the nomadic heritage of the Turkmen.

Turkmen lifestyle was heavily invested in horsemanship and as a prominent horse culture, Turkmen horse-breeding was an ages old tradition. Before the Soviet era, a proverb stated that the Turkmen's home was where his horse happened to stand. In spite of changes prompted during the Soviet period, the Ahal Teke tribe in southern Turkmenistan has remained very well known for its horses, the Akhal-Teke desert horse – and the horse breeding tradition has returned to its previous prominence in recent years.

Many tribal customs still survive among modern Turkmen. Unique to Turkmen culture is kalim which is a groom's "dowry", that can be quite expensive and often results in the widely practiced tradition of bridal kidnapping. In something of a modern parallel, in 2001, President Saparmurat Niyazov had introduced a state enforced "kalim", which required all foreigners who wanted to marry a Turkmen woman to pay a sum of no less than $50,000. The law was repealed in March 2005.

Other customs include the consultation of tribal elders, whose advice is often eagerly sought and respected. Many Turkmen still live in extended families where various generations can be found under the same roof, especially in rural areas.

The music of the nomadic and rural Turkmen people reflects rich oral traditions, where epics such as Koroglu are usually sung by itinerant bards. These itinerant singers are called bakshy and sing either a cappella or with instruments such as the dutar, a two-stringed lute.

=== Society today ===
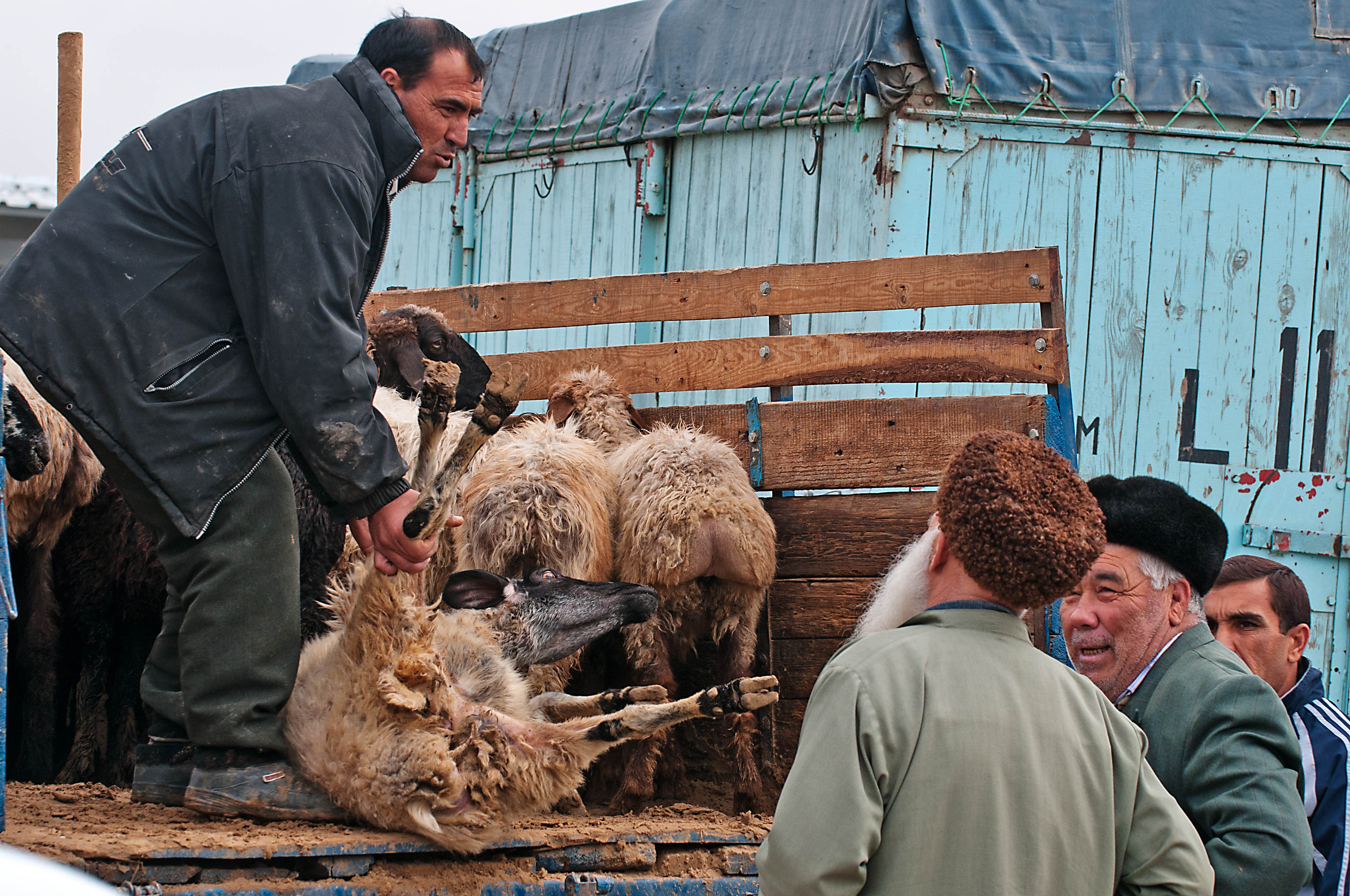
Turkmens in Ashgabat, Turkmenistan

Since Turkmenistan's independence in 1991, a cultural revival has taken place with the return of a moderate form of Islam and celebration of Novruz, the Persian New Year marking the onset of spring.

Turkmen can be divided into various social classes including the urban intelligentsia and workers whose role in society is different from that of the rural peasantry. Secularism and atheism remain prominent for many Turkmen intellectuals who favor moderate social changes and often view extreme religiosity and cultural revival with some measure of distrust.

The five traditional carpet rosettes, or gul, called göl in Turkmen, that form motifs in the country's state emblem and flag, represent the five major Turkmen tribes.

=== Sport ===
Sports have historically been an important part of Turkmen life. Such sports as horseback riding and Goresh have been praised in Turkmen literature. During the Soviet era, Turkmen athletes competed in numerous competitions, including Olympic Games as part of the Soviet Union team and, in 1992, as part of the Unified Team. After Turkmenistan gained her independence, new ways of establishing physical and sports movements in the country began to emerge. To implement a new sports policy, new multi-purpose stadiums, physical education and health complexes, sports schools and facilities were built in all regions of the country. Turkmenistan also has a modern Olympic village which hosted 2017 Asian Indoor and Martial Arts Games, and is unparalleled in Central Asia.

Turkmenistan supports the country's sports movements and encourages sports on a state level. While football remains the most popular sport, such sports as Turkmen goresh, horseback riding and lately ice hockey are also very popular among Turkmens.

== Demographics and population distribution ==
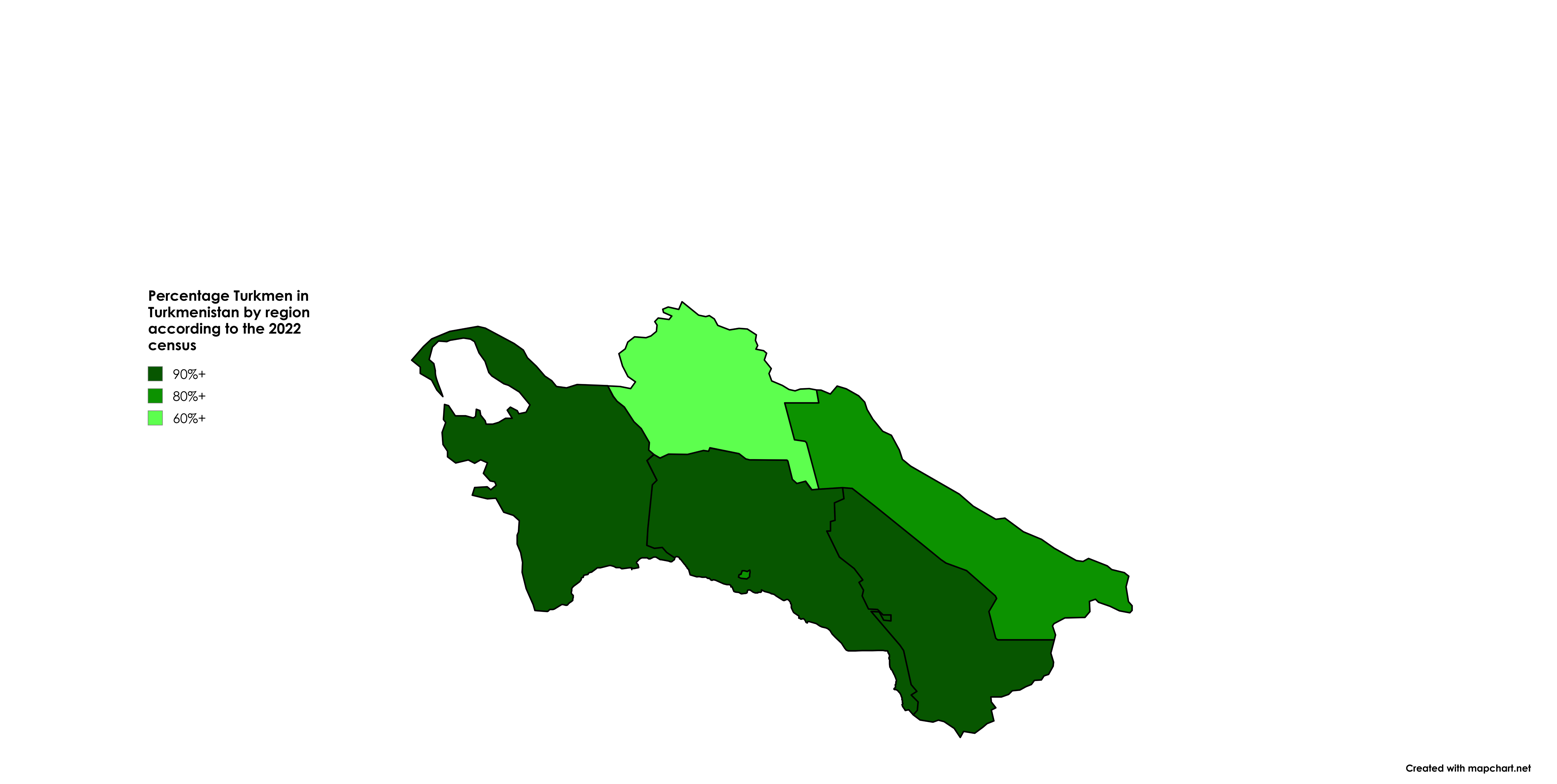
Percentage of Turkmens in Turkmenistan by region

In 1911, the population of Turkmens in the Russian Empire was estimated to be 290,170, and it was "conjectured that their total number [in all countries] does not exceed 350,000". In 1995, Turkmen academics estimated

...there are 125,000 Turkmen living in Uzbekistan, 40,000 in Russia and 22,000 in Tajikistan. The largest group of Turkmens is in Iran (850,000), Afghanistan (700,000), Iraq (235,000), Turkey (150,000), Syria (60,000), and China (85,000). In total, the number of Turkmens living abroad is about 2.2 million.

Today the Turkmen people of Central Asia and near neighbors live in:

- Turkmenistan, where some 85% of the population of 5,042,920 people (July 2006 est.) are ethnic Turkmen. In addition, an estimated 1,200 Turkmen refugees from northern Afghanistan currently reside in Turkmenistan due to the ravages of the Soviet–Afghan War and factional fighting in Afghanistan which saw the rise and fall of the Taliban.
- Afghanistan, where as of 2006, 200,000 ethnic Turkmen are concentrated primarily along the Turkmen-Afghan border in the provinces of Faryab, Jowzjan, Samangan and Baghlan. There are also communities in Balkh and Kunduz Provinces.
- Iran, where about 719,000 Turkmen are primarily concentrated in the provinces of Golestān and North Khorasan.

=== Turkmens in Iran ===
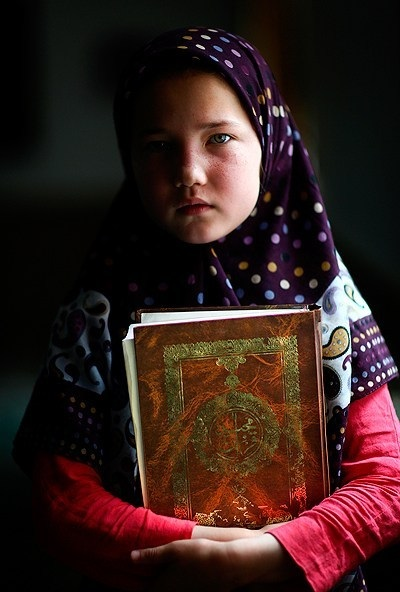
A Turkmen girl from Iran

Iranian Turkmens are a branch of Turkmen people who live mainly in northern and northeastern regions of Iran. Their region is called Turkmen Sahra and includes substantial parts of Golestan province. Representatives of such contemporary Turkmen tribes as Yomut, Goklen, Īgdīr, Saryk, Salar and Teke have lived in Iran since the 16th century, though ethnic history of Turkmens in Iran starts with the Seljuk conquest of the region in the 11th century.

=== Turkmens in Afghanistan ===
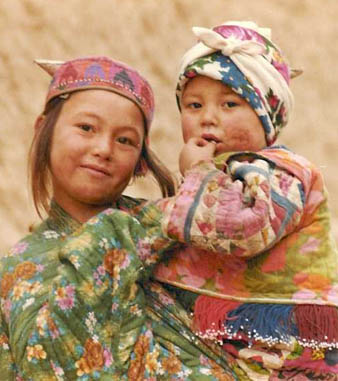
Turkmen girl and baby from Afghanistan

The Afghan Turkmen population in the 1990s was estimated at 200,000. The original Turkmen groups came from east of the Caspian Sea into northwestern Afghanistan at various periods, particularly after the end of the 19th century when the Russians moved into their territory. They established settlements from Balkh Province to Herat Province, where they are now concentrated; smaller groups settled in Kunduz Province. Others came in considerable numbers as a result of the failure of the Basmachi revolts against the Bolsheviks in the 1920s. Turkmen tribes, of which there are twelve major groups in Afghanistan, base their structure on genealogies traced through the male line. Senior members wield considerable authority. Formerly a nomadic and warlike people feared for their lightning raids on caravans, Turkmen in Afghanistan are farmer-herdsmen and important contributors to the economy. They brought karakul sheep to Afghanistan and are also renowned makers of carpets, which, with karakul pelts, are major hard currency export commodities. Turkmen jewelry is also highly prized.

=== Turkmens of Stavropol Krai of Russia ===
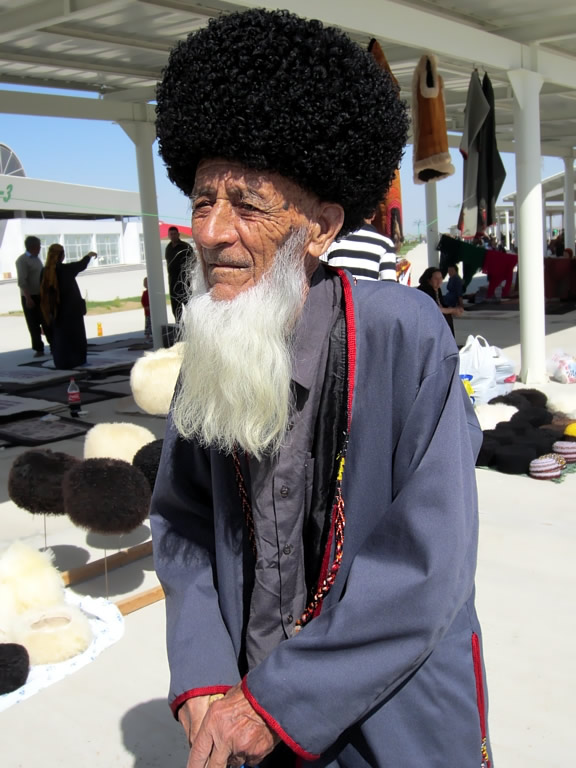
A Turkmen elder or aksakal

A long established Turkmen colony resides in Stavropol Krai of southern Russia. The local ethnic Russian population often refers to them as Trukhmen, and these Turkmen sometimes use the self-designation Turkpen. According to the 2010 Census of Russia, they numbered 15,048, and accounted for 0.5% of the total population of Stavropol Krai.

The Turkmens are said to have migrated into the Caucasus in the 17th century, mostly from the Mangyshlak region. These migrants belonged mainly to the Chowdur (in Russian "Chaudorov" or "Chavodur"), Sonchadj and Ikdir tribes. The early settlers were nomadic but over time became sedentary. In their cultural life the Trukhmens of today differ very little from their neighbours and are now settled farmers and stockbreeders.

Although the Turkmen language belongs to the Oghuz group of Turkic languages, in Stavropol it has been strongly influenced by the Nogai language, which belongs to the Kipchak group. The phonetic system, grammatical structure and to some extent also the vocabulary have been somewhat influenced.

== Notable people of Turkmen descent ==
=== Cinema ===
- Alty Karliev
- İlyas Salman
- Jackie Shroff
- Tiger Shroff

=== Literature ===
- Berdi Kerbabayev
- Döwletmämmet Azady
- Magtymguly Pyragy
- Mämmetweli Kemine
- Solton Achilova

=== Military figures ===
- Ahmad Sanjar
- Begench Gundogdyev
- Tughril
- Yaylym Berdiyev

=== Rulers ===
- Quli Qutb Shah and his descendants
- Bharama Mulki
- Muhammad Quli Qutb Shah

=== Music ===
- Annagul Annakuliyeva
- Eypio
- Mähri Pirgulyýewa
- Maya Kuliyeva
- Medeniyet Shahberdiyeva
- Donald Swann
- Nury Halmammedov

=== Politicians ===
- Akja Nurberdiýewa
- Akmyrat Rejepow
- Çarymyrat Amanow
- Güýçmyrat Annagulyýew
- Gülşat Mämmedowa
- Gurbangeldi Batyrow
- Gurbanguly Berdimuhamedow
- Han Ahmedow
- Kaikhaziz Atabayev
- Muhammetnazar Gapurov
- Öwezgeldi Ataýew
- Ramin Nourqolipour
- Raşit Meredow
- Rejepbay Arazov
- Saparmurat Niyazov
- Serdar Berdimuhamedow
- Zafar Babajanow

=== Science ===
- Omid Kokabee

=== Sports ===
- Ahmet Ataýew
- Altymyrat Annadurdyýew
- Amangylyç Koçumow
- Arslanmyrat Amanow
- Bahtiýar Hojaahmedow
- Batyr Babaýew
- Baýram Durdyýew
- Begençmuhammet Kulyýew
- Begençmyrat Myradow
- Berdi Şamyradow
- Berdimyrat Nurmyradow
- Çaryýar Muhadow
- Didargylyç Urazow
- Ezzatollah Pourghaz
- Farhad Ghaemi
- Furkat Tursunow
- Gurbangeldi Durdyýew
- Guwançmuhammet Öwekow
- Kurban Berdyev
- Mayya Gurbanberdieva
- Mämmedaly Garadanow
- Mekan Saparow
- Myrat Annaýew
- Omar Berdiýew
- Rahman Myratberdiýew
- Rahym Kurbanmämmedow
- Rasul Çaryýew
- Rejepmyrat Agabaýew
- Röwşen Muhadow
- Saber Kazemi
- Said Seýidow
- Sardar Azmoun
- Serdar Annaorazow
- Şöhrat Söýünow
- Täçmyrat Agamyradow
- Ýazguly Hojageldyýew

== See also ==
- Iranian Turkmens
- Afghan Turkmens
- Turkmens in Pakistan

== Sources ==
- Barthold, V., ed. (1962). The book of my grandfather Korkut. Moscow and Leningrad: USSR Academy of Sciences.
- Damgaard, P. B.; et al. (9 May 2018). "137 ancient human genomes from across the Eurasian steppes". Nature. 557 (7705). Nature Research: 369–373. Bibcode:2018Natur.557..369D. doi:10.1038/s41586-018-0094-2. hdl:1887/3202709. PMID 29743675. S2CID 13670282.
- Lee, Joo-Yup; Kuang, Shuntu (18 October 2017). "A Comparative Analysis of Chinese Historical Sources and Y-DNA Studies with Regard to the Early and Medieval Turkic Peoples". Inner Asia. 19 (2). Brill: 197–239. doi:10.1163/22105018-12340089. ISSN 2210-5018.
- Li, Tao; et al. (June 2020). "Millet agriculture dispersed from Northeast China to the Russian Far East: Integrating archaeology, genetics, and linguistics". Archaeological Research in Asia. 22 100177. Elsevier. doi:10.1016/j.ara.2020.100177. hdl:21.11116/0000-0005-D82B-8.
- Nelson, Sarah; et al. (14 February 2020). "Tracing population movements in ancient East Asia through the linguistics and archaeology of textile production". Evolutionary Human Sciences. 2 (e5). Cambridge University Press: e5. doi:10.1017/ehs.2020.4. PMC 10427276. PMID 37588355.
- Robbeets, Martine (1 January 2017). "Austronesian influence and Transeurasian ancestry in Japanese". Language Dynamics and Change. 8 (2). Brill: 210–251. doi:10.1163/22105832-00702005. hdl:11858/00-001M-0000-002E-8635-7. ISSN 2210-5832.
- Robbeets, Martine (2020). "The Transeurasian homeland: where, what and when?". In Robbeets, Martine; Savelyev, Alexander (eds.). The Oxford Guide to the Transeurasian Languages. Oxford University Press. ISBN 978-0-19-880462-8.
- Uchiyama, Junzo; et al. (21 May 2020). "Populations dynamics in Northern Eurasian forests: a long-term perspective from Northeast Asia". Evolutionary Human Sciences. 2 e16. Cambridge University Press. doi:10.1017/ehs.2020.11. PMC 10427466. PMID 37588381. Text was copied from this source, which is available under a Creative Commons Attribution 4.0 International License.
- Bacon, Elizabeth E. Central Asians Under Russian Rule: A Study in Culture Change, Cornell University Press (1980). ISBN 0-8014-9211-4.
- Turkmenistan Pages by Ekahau
- Did the engsi hang inside or outside the yurt?
