= Aýterek Günterek =

Aýterek Günterek may refer to:

- Aýterek Günterek (game)
- "Aýterek Günterek", a song by Mähri Pirgulyýewa
