= Nury Halmammedov =

Turkmen composer (1938–1983)

Nurmammet Halmammedov
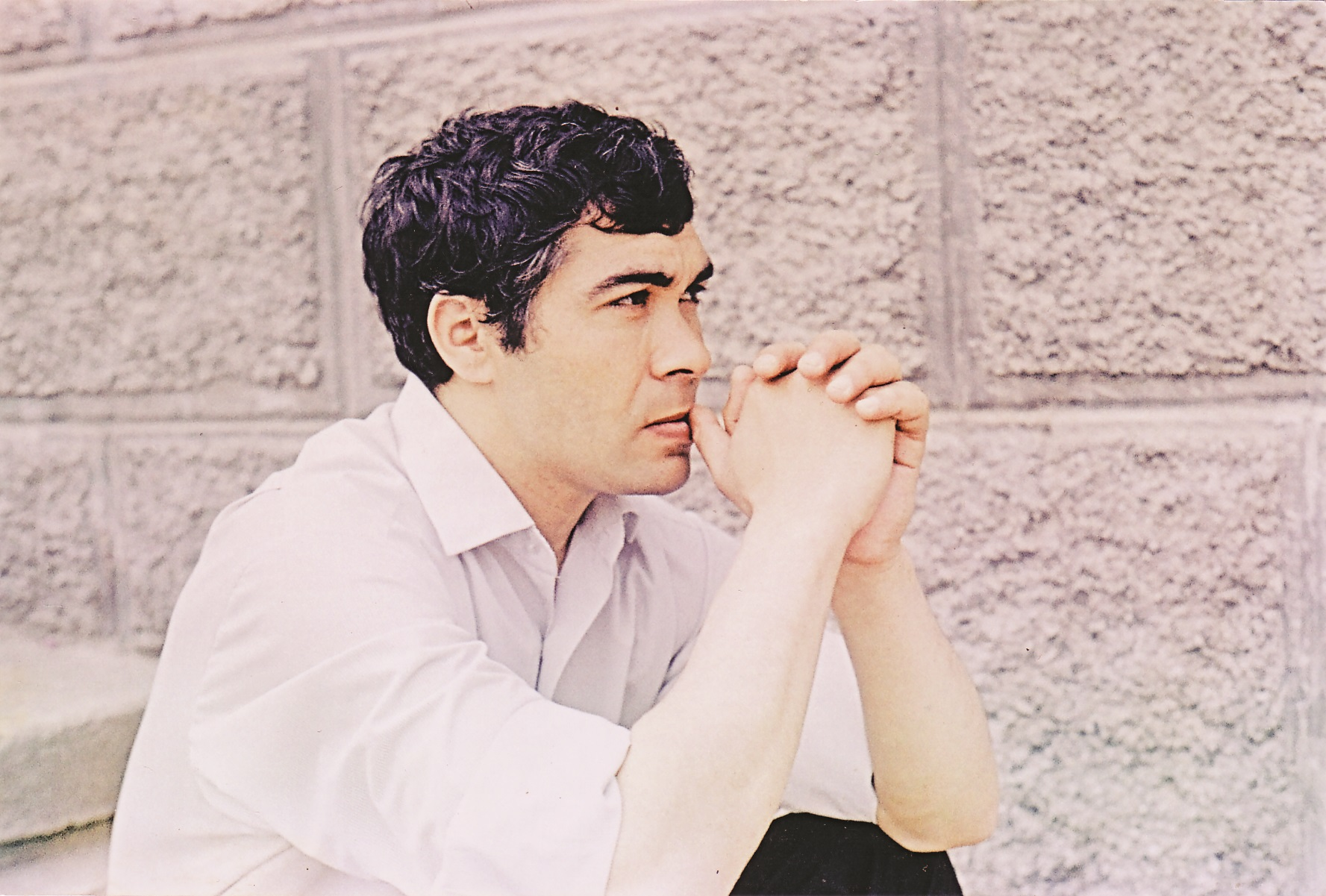
- Halmammedov.

Background information
- Also known as: Nury Halmammedov; Nury Halmammet
- Born: Nurmammet Halmammedovich Halmammedov; 20 June 1938; Dayna village, Kara-Kalinsk district, Turkmen SSR, USSR (now Turkmenistan)
- Died: 4 August 1983 (aged 45) Ashkhabad, Turkmen SSR, USSR (now Ashgabat, Turkmenistan)
- Genres: Classical
- Occupation: Composer
- Instrument: Pianoforte
- Years active: 1956–1983

Bust of Nury Halmammedov in Dayna village. Photo courtesy of Infoabad, used with permission.

Nurmammet Halmammedovich Halmammedov (Turkmen: Nurmämmet Halmämmedowiç Halmämmedow; Russian: Нурмаммед Халмамметович Халмамметов, romanized: Nurmammed Khalmammetovich Khalmammetov; 20 June 1938 – 4 August 1983), also known as Nury Halmammedov (Turkmen: Nury Halmämmedow; Russian: Нуры Халмамметов, romanized: Nury Khalmammetov) or Nury Halmammet (Turkmen: Nury Halmämmet; Russian: Нуры Халмаммед, romanized: Nury Khalmammed), was a prominent Turkmen composer described as one of Turkmenistan's "Greatest Sons". His legacy has been commemorated with anniversary events in Turkmenistan and Russia.

== Early childhood and education ==
Halmammedov was born on 20 June 1938 in Daýna village near Bäherden, Turkmenistan, to Halmammet Bayliyev and Hangul-Eje Mammedaliyeva. He had a cat, which died protecting Nury from a snake when he was an infant. Nury never forgot about him. Nury had a very difficult childhood. According to Jemile Gurbanova's biography of Halmammedov, his mother died in 1944, and his father moved to Iran with two of the family's four sons, Begmammet and Ashyrberdi, abandoning Nury, his 17-year-old brother, Bayly, and older sister, Artyk. Nury's memories of this time were grim. He recounted at one point.

Since in my childhood I drank cloudy water from an irrigation ditch and lived off the grasses growing along its banks, by age 4 or 5 my belly swelled up and was elastic, like a ball. Because of my round stomach I couldn't see my own feet.

Bayly committed Nury to the Garrygala orphanage. In 1947 Nury was transferred to the Bäherden boarding school. In 1948 little Nury ran away from the boarding school, boarded a train with three rubles in hand intending to go to Moscow, but ended up in Ashgabat. When discovered by authorities, since he had no papers and could not identify his parents, he was sent to the Baýramaly orphanage. Here he encountered a piano teacher, Olga Krivchenko, and began studying piano.

In 1954, Halmammedov was transferred to Turkmen State Music School in Ashgabat, where he studied under Viktor Khiruntsev and Elena Kulesh. At this school he was introduced to composition by Ashyr Guliyev, and wrote his first piece, "Dance", for piano. Other compositions during this period include "March", "Play", and "Reminisces", as well as pieces for cello and violin with piano.

In 1958 he entered Moscow State P. I. Tchaikovsky Conservatory, graduating in 1963. His major adviser was Anatoly Alexandrov, who described Halmammedov as "...devilishly talented..." and "a gifted rarity". While at the conservatory Halmammedov wrote about 30 songs, romances, and choral works, including romances based on the works of Magtymguly Pyragy and Mollanepes. During this period, Halmammedov composed chamber music, as well as many works for piano, violin, cello, viola, and trumpet. These include Sonata for Violin and Piano (1963), Song Poem for Cello and Piano (1962), and Lullaby Fantasy for Viola and Piano (1963). While studying at the Conservatory, he wrote more than nineteen compositions for piano, on top of the larger Variety Theme (1962), Scherzo (1958), Sanya (1961), Prelude in C-sharp Minor (1960), and Five-Part Turkmen Polyphonic Suite (1963). Halmammedov wrote a major piano work during this period, Sounds of the Dutar, published in 1962 and dedicated to the prominent Turkmen dutarist Mylly Tachmyradov. In this composition, Halmammedov sought not only to reproduce the sounds of a dutar on piano, but also to capture Tachmyradov's virtuosity as well.

Halmammedov's graduation project was the symphonic portrait "Turkmenia", which premiered at his graduation examination in 1963, performed by the All-Union Radio and Television Great Symphony Orchestra. It was his first symphonic composition. The Soviet record label Melodiya published a phonograph of this work in 1967.

== Career ==
Halmammedov published at least 175 works between 1956 and his death in 1983, including over 40 works for pianoforte. These included musical scores for 30 motion pictures, including 9 animated films, 18 art films, and 3 documentaries. The first of these scores was for Bulat Mansurov's 1963 film, Contest. The score for Alty Garliyev's Decisive Step followed in 1965; Garliyev said Halmammedov's contribution made him a "full co-author" of the film. Halmammedov additionally put verse to music, including poetry by Gurbannazar Ezizov, as well as Sergei Yesenin and Heinrich Heine. In particular, Halmammedov was noted for putting to music Yesenin's lyric poetry in Persian Motifs (1969–1971), blending Turkmen- and Persian tonalities in six parts: My Old Wounds are Healed, Blue and Joyful Country, Interview, Shagan, My Shagan, My Beloved's Hands are a Pair of Swans, and Countless Sounds of Sparrows. He composed the music for the 1974 opera Görogly. String Quartet (1976) was dedicated to mothers and children who suffered in Nazi concentration camps. He wrote the libretto and score for the 1983 ballet version of Decisive Step, which was performed at the Magtymguly Theater in Ashgabat.

Halmammedov died in Ashgabat of cirrhosis of the liver and complications of diabetes. He is buried at the Vatutin Cemetery there.

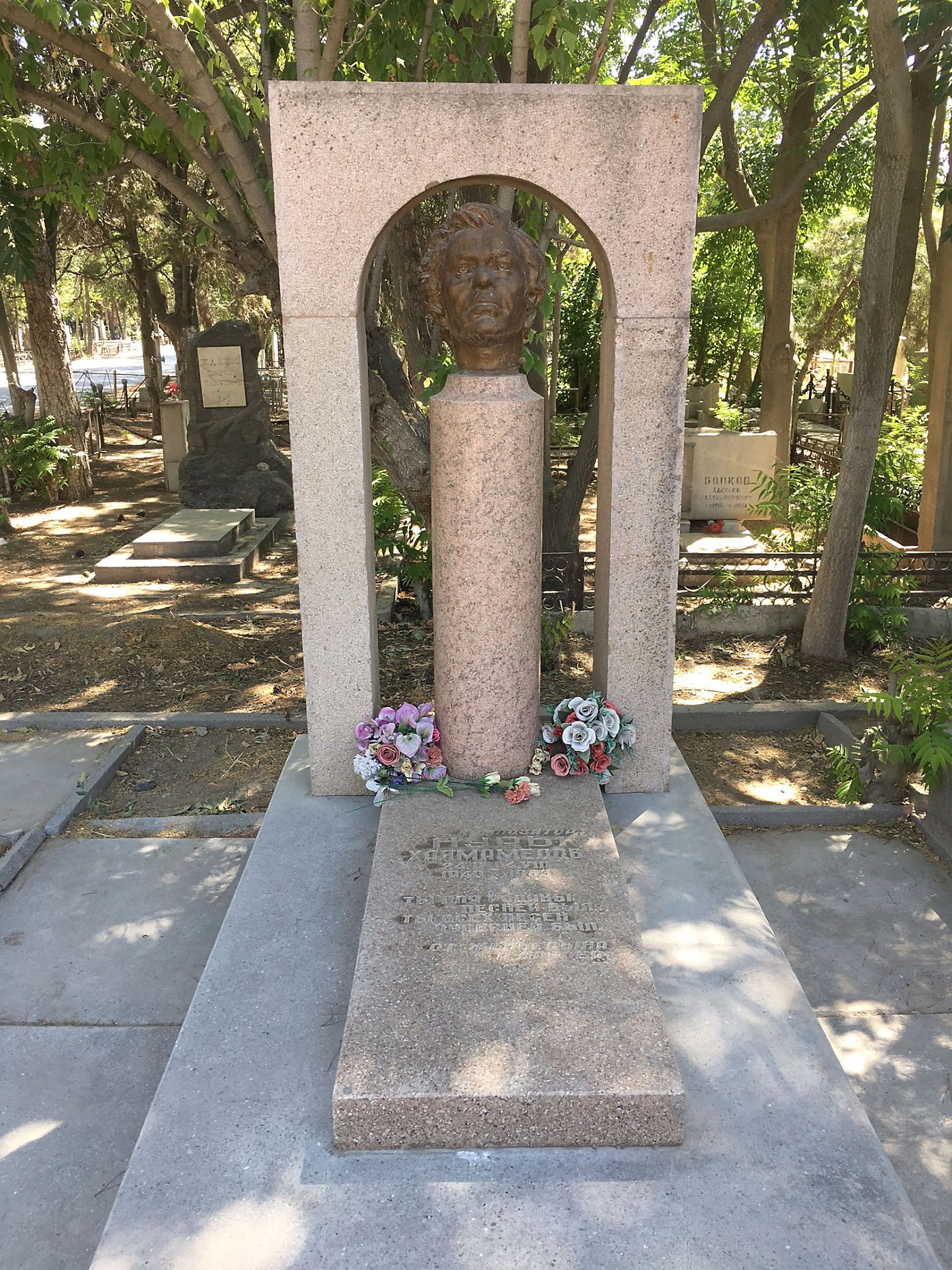
Grave marker of Turkmen composer Nury Halmammedov, located at Vatutin Cemetery, Ashgabat, Turkmenistan

== Legacy ==
A street in Ashgabat is named in Halmammedov's honor, and a statue of him stands at the western end of that street. A bust of Halmammedov also stands in his home village, Daýna. An annual music festival in Moscow is held in Halmammedov's honor.

The program brochure for the III Moscow International Nury Halmammedov Festival noted, "His music is so naturally and durably woven into the everyday life of the Turkmen people that mothers sing Lullaby from Decisive Step to their children, not even suspecting that this music isn't a folk song. Or another example: when someone dies, he is accompanied on his final journey by Halmammedov's mournful melody from the film Bitter Fate".

== Musical style ==
Aleksandrov told Halmammedov when handing him his diploma upon graduation from the conservatory that he should continue to study Turkmen folk music but also should listen as often as possible to other music. In Cherkezova's words, Halmammedov took this advice and learned he could "find points of contact" between two completely different genres and "harmonically merging two miracles, he created a third."

Halmammedov's work was noted for incorporating elements from both the Turkmen folk musical heritage and the broader classical tradition as taught at the Moscow conservatory. Turkmen singer Medeniyet Shahberdiyeva, who performed many of his works, remarked, "The rhythms of Nury's works are Turkmen, but the harmony belongs to world musical culture."

Vasiliy Larionov noted that Halmammedov's Persian Motifs applied a plot progression characteristic of Turkmen folk dessans: "The action is interpreted in a generalized emotional manner, action is shaped less by the progression of events than by their internal psychological interaction."

Musicologist Jemile Gurbanova noted the influences of early Franz Schubert on Halmammedov's vocal works, of Nikolai Rimsky-Korsakov and Aram Khachaturian on his symphonic works, of Robert Schumann on piano pieces, and of Franz Liszt and Sergei Rachmaninoff on romantic works. She noted as well, however, that national folklore remained his "primary inspiration." Cherkezova cites film producer Yevgeny Mikhelson's description of Halmammedov's score for one of his animated features, "...the national tone...which ran like a red thread through his entire composition." Soprano and musicologist Darya Rubanova wrote,

One of the principles seen in Halmammedov's musical compositions is singular intonational development, a characteristic feature of professional folk instrumentalism. National peculiarities are most clearly reflected in the melody, which performs an important emotional and semantic function. In [his] works...are organically intertwined song and dance, vocal, and instrumental principles. A peculiar refraction is found in various polyrhythmic forms, borrowed from the practice of folk instrumental performance.

== Personal life ==
Halmammedov was married twice. He had three children by his first wife, sons Rovshen and Sapar, and daughter Leyli. His second wife and widow was Gulsoltan Gylyjovna Khalmamedova (Turkmen: Gülsoltan Gylyjowna Halmämmedowa; Russian: Гульсолтан Клычевна Халмамедова, romanized: Gul'soltan Klychevna Khalmamedova) née Yagmyrova (Turkmen: Ýagmyrowa; Russian: Ягмурова, romanized: Yagmurova), who for many years headed Turkmenfilm. They had a son, Ashirberdy. Gulsoltan Halmamedova died in August 2019.

== Awards ==
- 1979 Meritorious Arts Activist of Turkmenistan
- 1983 Turkmenistan State Magtymguly Prize (posthumously)
- 1984 USSR State Prize (posthumously)
- 1991 People's Artist of Turkmenistan (posthumously)

== Discography ==
- Turkmenia Suite (сюита "Туркмения"), Melodiya, 1967
- Turkmenia Suite (сюита "Туркмения"), Sovetskiy kompozitor, 1968
- Tuýduk (Туйдук), 1981, C30-16287
- Symphony in E-minor (Симфония: ми-минор), 1983, M10 46181 008
- Interrupted Songs of Children of Hiroshima and Nagasaki (Недослушанные песни детей Хиросимы и Нагасаки), 1983, C 10 21689 003
- Quartet for Two Violins, Viola, and Cello (Квартет для 2-х скрипок, альта, виолончели), 1985, C 10 23097 001
- Plays for Pianoforte (Пьесы для фортепиано), undated, C 10 23403 007
- To You (К тебе), 1984, C 1022353 009
- Songs of Nury Halmammedov (Песни Нуры Халмаммедова), 1980–1985, C 60 28203 008
- Ashgabat (Ашгабат), undated, 60-13215
- Spring (Бахар), undated, D 00023193
- Two Trees (Два дерева), 1975–1986, C 60 27897002
- Enchantment (Очарование, Хайрана галар), 1984, C 60 23017 004
- Artyk's Song from the Motion Picture 'Decisive Step' (Песня Артыка из кинофильма "Решающий шаг"), undated, D 23151
- Saňa garaşýan, undated, M 61 36368
- Heart of the Poet (Сердце поэта, Şahyr ýüregi, 1980-1985, C 60 2803 008
- Song About Lenin (Lenin hakynda aýdym), undated, C 30 09001
- Ballad of Fate (Keçpelek, Баллада о судьбе), 1980, C 60-14789-90

== Motion picture soundtracks ==
=== Animated films ===
1. Öýsüz goňurja
2. Dostlar
3. Başagaýlyk
4. Üç dogan we ýaşyl aždarha
5. Tilki dost, halyň niçik?
6. Körpe we çörek
7. Tomzak we garynja
8. Pil hakda jedel
9. Düýe name üçin ýandak iýýär?

=== Feature films ===
1. Şükür bagşy
2. Çöl
3. Aýgytly ädim
4. Magtymguly
5. Ofiser walsy
6. Japbaklar
7. Mukamyň syry
8. Geçigaplaň
9. Kärizgenler
10. Tejene baryp ýetmek
11. Kakam gaýdyp geler
12. Dik aýak
13. Keçpelek
14. Atabaýew
15. Serdar
16. Ýürek sowgat üçin
17. Guşgy galasy
18. Gorkak batyr

=== Documentaries ===
1. Men we meniň doganlarym
2. Sahawatly deňiz
3. Güneşiň astyndaky duşuşyk

== External links to music ==
- Nury Halmamedov (YouTube)
- Нуры Халмамедов музыка из к/ф "Шукур Бахши" (Nury Halmammedov, music from Shukur Bakhshi, performed by Mamed Guseynov) (YouTube)
- The Interrupted songs of children of Hiroshima and Nagasaki (performed by Mamed Guseynov) (YouTube)
