= Turkestan =

Historical region in Central Asia

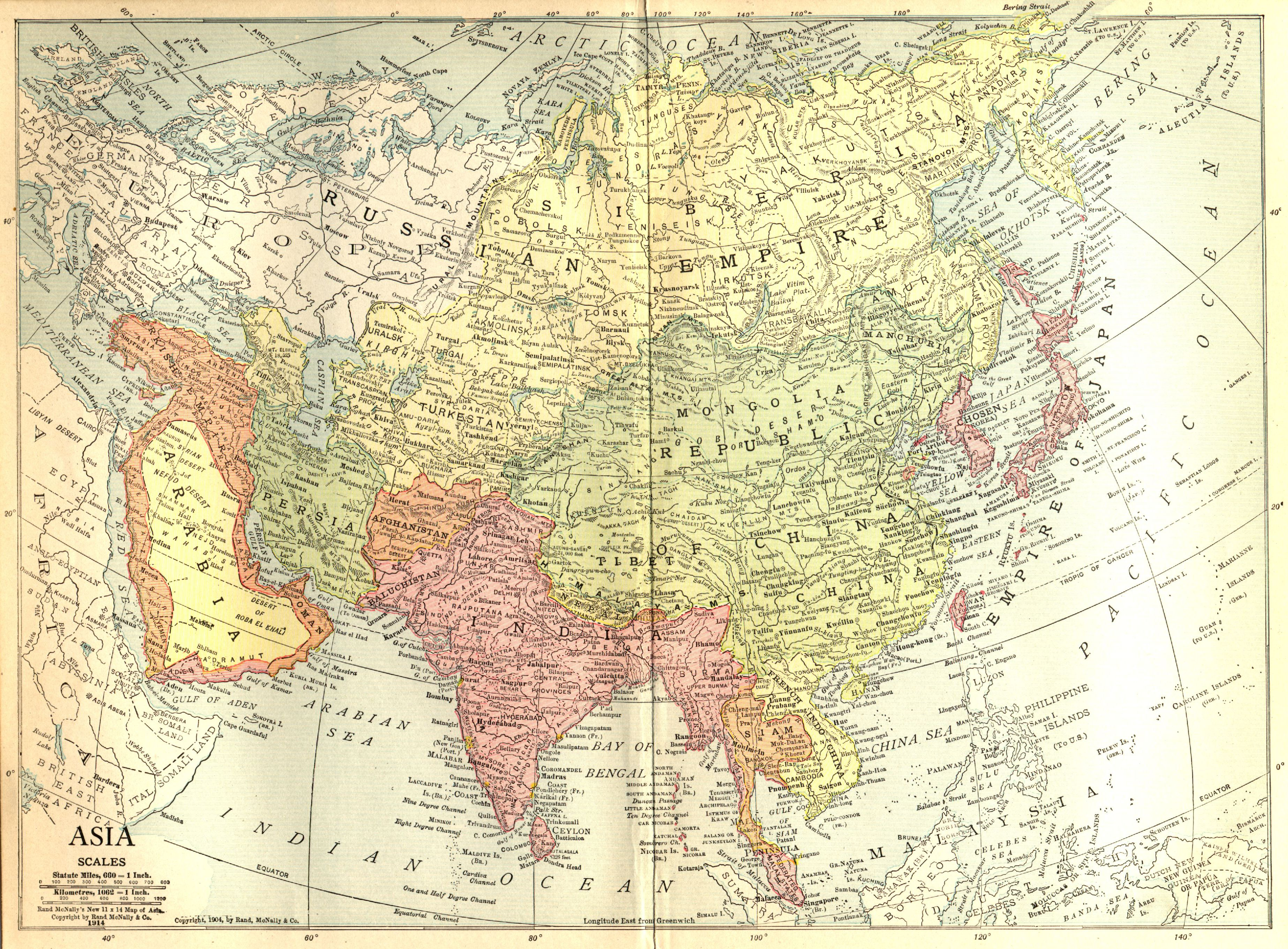
The West Turkestan region is noted on this 1914 map as simply "Turkestan"

Turkestan, (Note: /ˈtɜːrkɪˌstæn, -ə-, -ˌstɑːn/; Known in most Western academic sources (e.g., English, French, German, Spanish, etc.) as "Turkestan".; From Modern Iranian Persian: تركستان, romanized: Torkestân, lit. 'Land of the Turks', Iranian Persian pronunciation: [t̪oɹ.kʲes.t̪ɒːn]) also spelled Turkistan, (Note: Turkish: Türkistan [tyɾci̥sˈtan]; Azerbaijani: Türküstan [tʏɾcysˈtɑ(ː)n]; Turkmen: Түркүстан Türküstan [tʏɾkʏ̥θˈθɑːn]; Kyrgyz: Түркстан Türkstan [tʏɾkʏ̆stɑ́n]; Kazakh: Түркістан Türkıstan [tʉrkɘ̆stɑ́n]; Uzbek: Туркистон Turkiston [tʊrkɪ̥sˈtɒn]; Uyghur: تۈركىستان Türkistan [tʏɾkɪ̆stɑ́n]; Hindi: तुर्किस्तान and Urdu: ترکستان Turkistān [t̪ʊɾ.kɪs.t̪ɑːn], [t̪ʊɾ.kɪs.t̪ä̃ːn]; Chinese: 突厥斯坦; pinyin: Tūjuésītǎn [tʰút͡ɕɥø̌sɹ̩́tʰàn]; Tajik: Туркистон Turkiston [t̪uɾ.kis.t̪ɔn]; Pashto: ترکستان Turkistan; From Early New, Classical and Modern Dari/Afghan Persian ترکستان Turkistān [t̪uɾ.kis.ˈt̪aːn]) is a historical name for the region of Asia lying between the Caspian Sea to the west, Siberia to the north, the Gobi Desert in Mongolia to the east, and Iran, Afghanistan, the Indian subcontinent (Pakistan), and Tibet to the south. Turkestan is primarily inhabited by Turkic peoples, as well as Russian and Tajik minorities. It is subdivided into West Turkestan, which historically belonged to the Russian Empire and the Soviet Union, and East Turkestan (identified either with the Tarim Basin/Southern Xinjiang or with Xinjiang as a whole), which forms a part of China.

Throughout history, the region has been exposed to the invasion of several different groups and kingdoms, including the Huns, Hepthalites, Bactrians, Imperial China, Arab Caliphate, Macedonian Empire, Mauryan Empire, Achaemenid Empire, as well as various Turkic states and the Mongol Empire. The Qara Khitai also briefly controlled a significant bulk of Turkestan.

== Overview ==
Known as Turan to the Persians, Ma wara'u'n-nahr to its Arab conquerors, and Transoxiana by Western travelers. The latter two names refer to its position beyond the River Oxus when approached from the south, emphasizing Turkestan's long-standing relationship with Iran, the Persian Empires, and the Umayyad and Abbasid Caliphates.

Oghuz Turks (also known as Turkmens), Kyrgyzs, Uzbeks, Kazakhs, Khazars, Uyghurs, and Hazaras are some of the Turkic inhabitants of the region who, as history progressed, have spread further into Eurasia forming such Turkic nations as Turkey, and subnational regions like Tatarstan in Russia and Crimea in Ukraine. Tajiks and Russians form sizable non-Turkic minorities.

It is subdivided into Afghan Turkestan and historical Russian Turkestan (the latter of which extended in the south to Persia, in the west to the Aral and Caspian Seas and in the northeast to Lake Balkhash and Lake Zaysan) in the west, and Chinese Turkestan or East Turkestan in the east.

== Etymology ==
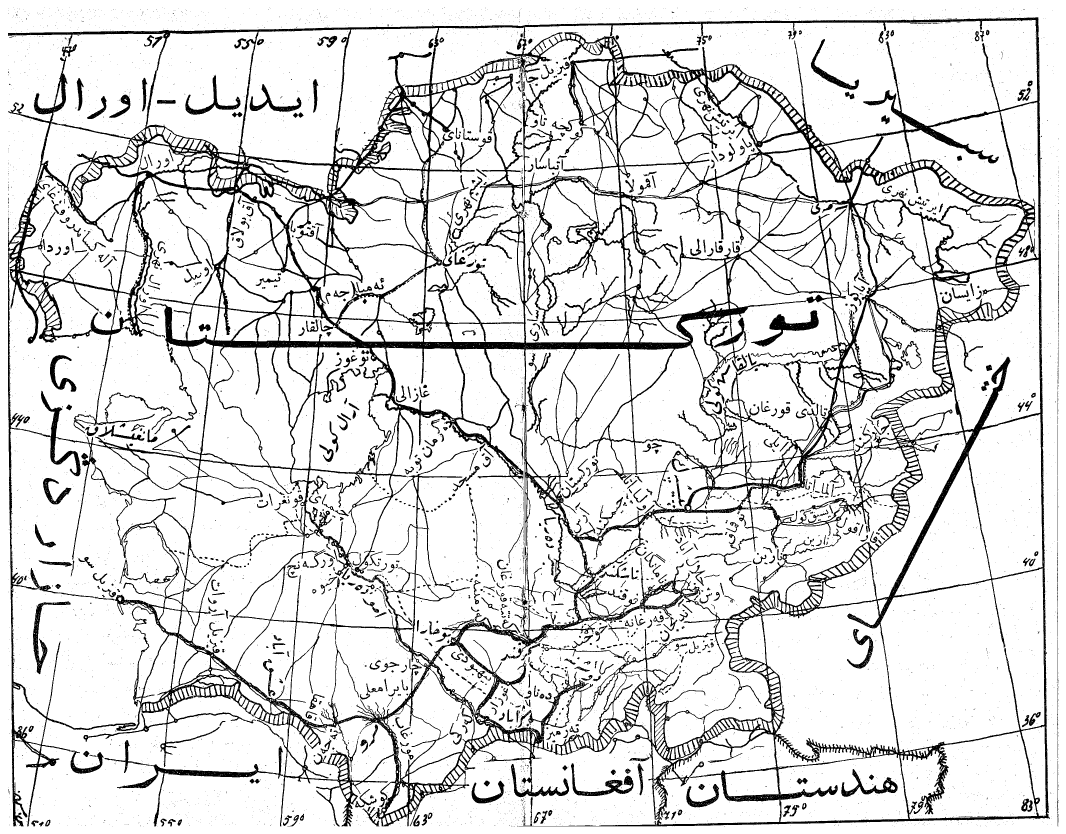
Chagatai language map depicting Turkestan (تورکستان), from the November 1931 issue of the Berlin-based Yash Turkistan magazine

Of Persian origin (see -stan), the term "Turkestan" (ترکستان) had historically never referred to a single nation state. Persian geographers first used the word to describe the place where Turkic peoples lived. According to ethnographer Dávid Somfai Kara, prior to the Russian conquest, Turkestan historically referred only to the western portion of Central Asia:

The Eastern part of Central Asia (inhabited by nomads of the Tien Shan Mountains and settled peoples of the Tarim Basin) was called Moghulistan (“Mongol land”). The Western part (inhabited by nomads of Syr-darya and settled peoples of Khwarazm) was called Turkestan (Turk land), although both were both inhabited by linguistically Turkic ethnic groups. Beginning in the nineteenth century, the term Turkestan was also applied to Ferghana and Mawara-an-nahr by the Russians.

The Russian Empire officially adopted the name for its southern Central Asian provinces in the 19th century. According to various authors, on their way southward during the conquest of Central Asia, the Russians under Nikolai Aleksandrovich Veryovkin took the city of Turkistan (in present-day Kazakhstan) in 1864. Mistaking its name for the entire region, they adopted the designation of "Turkestan" (Russian: Туркестан) for their new lands. However, this story may be apocryphal. According to Annette M.B. Meakin, Gibbon used this name for the area around a century earlier than the events in question supposedly took place. Furthermore, there is substantial historical evidence that this term was used in Persian to denote a similar territory prior to the Russian annexation of the region.

In 1969, a Turfanian document from 639 CE was found in the Astana district of Turpan, which recorded Sogdian sale contract of a female slave from the period of the Gaochang kingdom under the rule of Qu clan and mentioned the Sogdian word "twrkstn", which may have referred to the lands to the east and north of Syr Darya in the realm of the First Turkic Khaganate.

In 2024, Turkish Ministry of Education changed the term 'Central Asia' (Turkish: Orta Asya) to 'Turkestan' (Turkish: Türkistan) in history textbooks.

== History ==
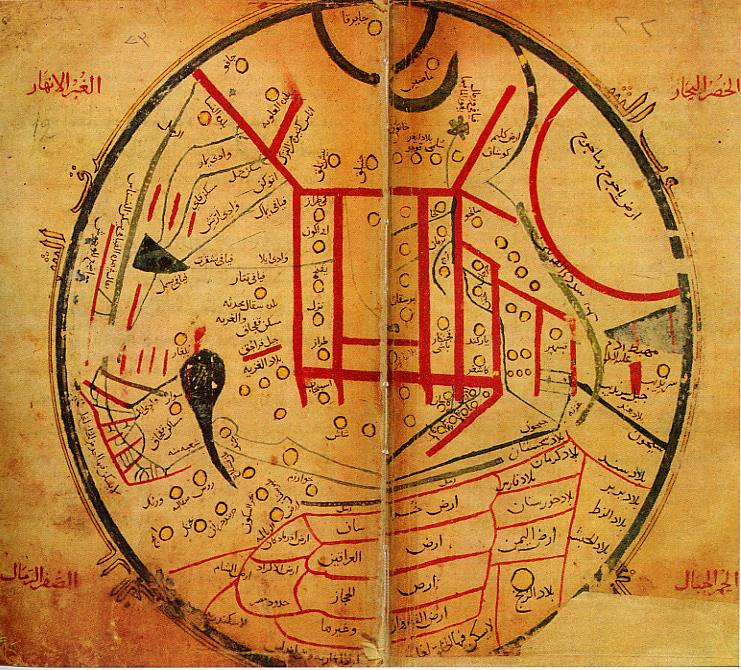
Map from Mahmud al-Kashgari's Dīwān Lughat al-Turk, showing the 11th century distribution of Turkic tribes

The history of the Central Asian region that was later called Turkestan dates back to at least the third millennium BC. Many artifacts were produced in that period, with much trade being conducted. The region was a focal point for cultural diffusion, as the Silk Road traversed it.

Turkic sagas, such as the "Ergenekon" legend, and written sources, such as the Orkhon Inscriptions, in the 8th century AD, state that Turkic peoples originated in the nearby Altai Mountains, and, through nomadic settlement, started their long journey westwards. Much earlier than the Gokturks or their Orkhon Inscriptions, other groups such as the Huns conquered the area after they conquered Kashgaria in the early 2nd century BC. With the dissolution of the Huns' Empire, Chinese rulers took over Eastern Central Asia, which was centuries later also called Turkestan. Arab forces captured it in the 8th century. The Persian Samanid dynasty subsequently conquered it and the area experienced economic success.

The Northern Yuan dynasty and Turco-Mongol residual states and domains by the 15th century

The entire territory was held at various times by Turkic forces, such as the Göktürks, until the conquest by Genghis Khan and the Mongols in 1220. Genghis Khan gave the territory to his son Chagatai and the area became the Chagatai Khanate. Timur took over the western portion of Turkestan in 1369, and the area became part of the Timurid Empire. The eastern portion of Turkestan was also called Moghulistan and continued to be ruled by descendants of Genghis Khan.

=== Chinese influence ===
In Chinese historiography, the Qara Khitai is most commonly called the "Western Liao" (西遼) and is considered to be a legitimate Chinese dynasty, as is the case for the Liao dynasty. The history of the Qara Khitai was included in the History of Liao (one of the Twenty-Four Histories), which was compiled officially during the Yuan dynasty by Toqto'a et al.

After the fall of the Tang dynasty, various dynasties of non-Han ethnic origins gained prestige by portraying themselves as the legitimate dynasty of China. Qara Khitai monarchs used the title of "Chinese emperor", and were also called the "Khan of Chīn". The Qara Khitai used the "image of China" to legitimize their rule to the Central Asians. The Chinese emperor, together with the rulers of the Turks, Arabs, India and the Byzantine Romans, were known to Islamic writers as the world's "five great kings". Qara Khitai kept the trappings of a Chinese state, such as Chinese coins, Chinese imperial titles, the Chinese writing system, tablets, seals, and used Chinese products like porcelain, mirrors, jade and other Chinese customs. The adherence to Liao Chinese traditions has been suggested as a reason why the Qara Khitai did not convert to Islam. Despite the Chinese trappings, there were comparatively few Han Chinese among the population of the Qara Khitai. These Han Chinese had lived in Kedun during the Liao dynasty, and in 1124 migrated with the Khitans under Yelü Dashi along with other people of Kedun, such as the Bohai, Jurchen, and Mongol tribes, as well as other Khitans in addition to the Xiao consort clan.

Qara Khitai's rule over the Muslim-majority Central Asia has the effect of reinforcing the view among some Muslim writers that Central Asia was linked to China even though the Tang dynasty had lost control of the region a few hundred years ago. Marwazī wrote that Transoxiana was a former part of China, while Fakhr al-Dīn Mubārak Shāh defined China as part of "Turkestan", and the cities of Balāsāghūn and Kashghar were considered part of China.

The association of Khitai with China meant that the most enduring trace of the Khitan's power is names that are derived from it, such as Cathay, which is the medieval Latin appellation for China. Names derived from Khitai are still current in modern usage, such as the Russian, Bulgarian, Uzbek and Mongolian names for China. However, the use of the name Khitai to mean "China" or "Chinese" by Turkic speakers within China, such as the Uyghurs, is considered pejorative by the Chinese authorities, who tried to ban it.

=== Chiggisid Period ===
The Turkestan region is now known among historians to have been famous for its oases and beautiful cities since 4th Century BC. It was taken by conquest by Alexander of Macedonia because he desired its wealth on his journey to the Hindu Kush. As such, in the 13th Century AD, the Mongols of Eastern Asia invaded and conquered Turkestan under their leader, Genghis Khan. Later on in the following century Timur Lenk, more commonly known as Tamerlane, established his Mongol Empire capital in Samarkand.

Poverty would soon begin to engulf the Mongol Empire, but not the city-states of Turkestan which remained up to the 19th century AD. Eastern Turkestan came to be part of the territory of the Chinese Qing dynasty via conquest of the Oirats in 1762. It was formally made a province of the dynasty in 1884. The Russians annexed the majority of Turkestan territories in the 1860s following numerous treaties with Manchu China.

=== Modern history ===
Until 1924, Turkestan was part of the Soviet Union as an autonomous republic. During WWII, according to the Polish National Council, Polish Jewish refugees had been sent to Turkestan. It was split up according to ethnicity to form five new nations, which included Kazakhstan, Kyrgyzstan, Tajikistan, Turkmenistan, and Uzbekistan. In 1991, these became independent nations following the dissolution of the USSR.

== Geography ==
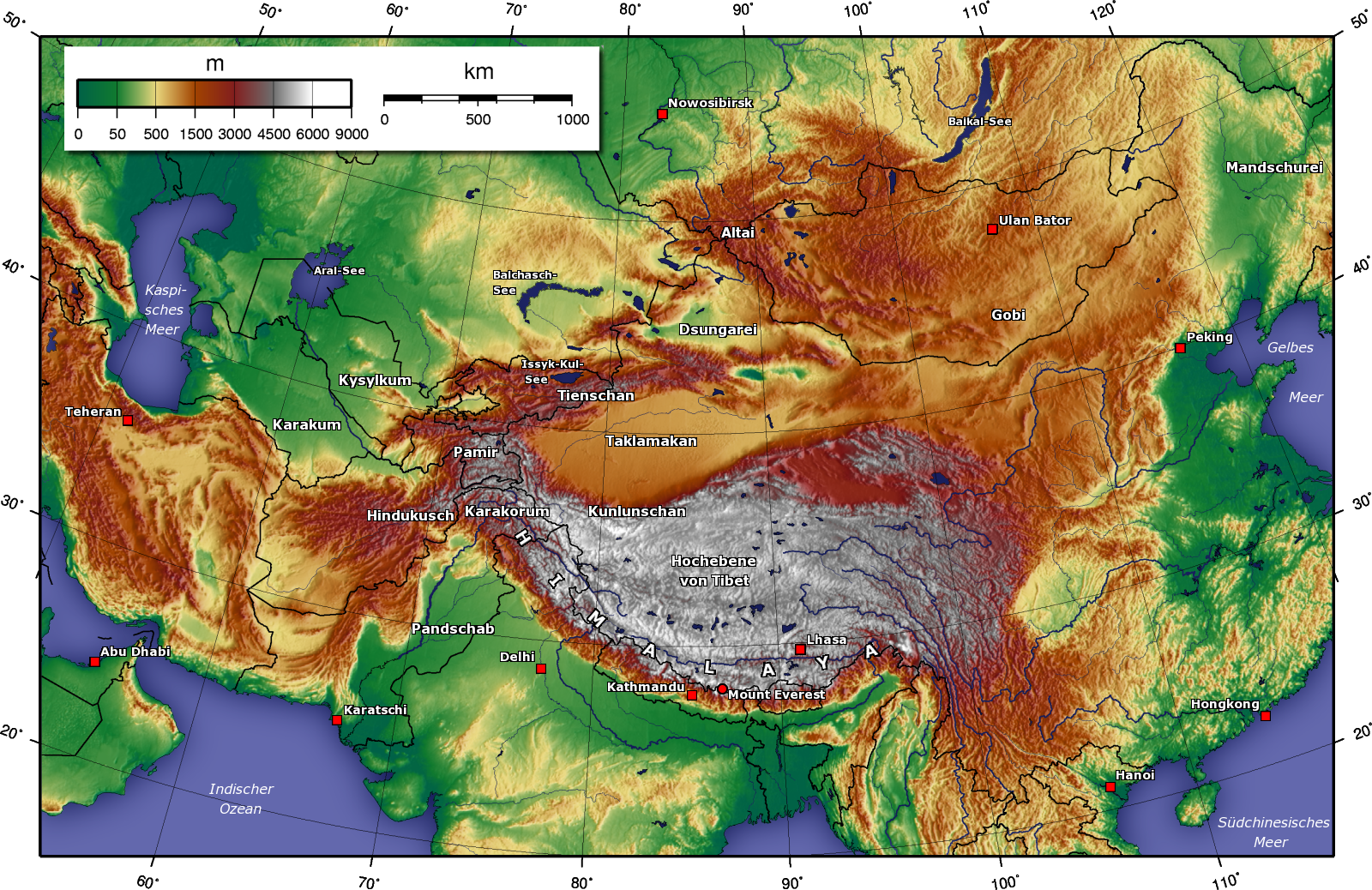
Topographic map of Central Asia

From the Gobi, the large desert region of central China from which it forms a continuous belt, Turkestan extends all the way to the Caspian Sea, some two thousand miles (3,200 kilometers) distant. The region covers several states, such as China and Afghanistan. The borders of the region were not distinctly demarcated; however, the territories covered by modern-day Turkestan exceed an area of over a million square miles (2.5 million square kilometers).

The deserts in Turkestan, including Karakum and Kyzylkum, cover huge areas, as do its mountain ranges. The Pamirs and Tian-Shan, located in the south-eastern part of the country, rank among the tallest in the world. From the towering heights of these extensive mountain ranges, one can see tableland areas, which start at 10,000 feet and higher above sea level. Outside the mountain ranges, rainfall does not exceed 12 inches. Mountain snowfall forms rivers, which create deep valleys in the plateaus. Irrigated valleys become very fertile oasis regions. Inland-flowing rivers like the Syr-Darya and Amu-Darya are rare and mostly small and shallow.

The ethnolinguistic patchwork of Central Asia in 1992

== See also ==
- East Turkestan
- Greater Central Asia
- Pan-Turkism
- Russian conquest of Central Asia
- Persecution of Uyghurs in China

== Sources ==
- Biran, Michal (2005). The Empire of the Qara Khitai in Eurasian History: between China and the Islamic World. Cambridge: Cambridge University Press. ISBN 9780521842266.
- Rezakhani, Khodadad (2017). "East Iran in Late Antiquity". ReOrienting the Sasanians: East Iran in Late Antiquity. Edinburgh University Press. pp. 1–256. ISBN 9781474400305. JSTOR 10.3366/j.ctt1g04zr8. (registration required)
