= Aýterek Günterek (game) =

Central Asian children's game

Aýterek Günterek ("The Moon Tree and the Sun Tree"), alternatively Ak Terek Gök Terek ("The White Tree and the Blue Tree"), is a Central Asian children's game.

== Etymology ==
The English name, Ayterek Gunterek, is Turkmen for "The Moon Tree and the Sun Tree". Various other names exist in other Central Asian languages.

== Gameplay ==
The game is set up with two teams facing each other. Each team stands in a line respectively, linking arms. The first team chants "Who do you need?", with the second team responding with the name of a person from the first team. The named person subsequently begins to hurl themself at the second team and makes an attempt to break one of the links and force themself through the line. If they succeed, they take one person from the second team back to the first team and vice versa. The game is analogous to red rover, a similar children's game played in English countries.

== In popular culture ==
Myahri, a singer from Turkmenistan, sang a namesake song based on the game itself.
