= Delacău, Anenii Noi =

Delacău
- Commune
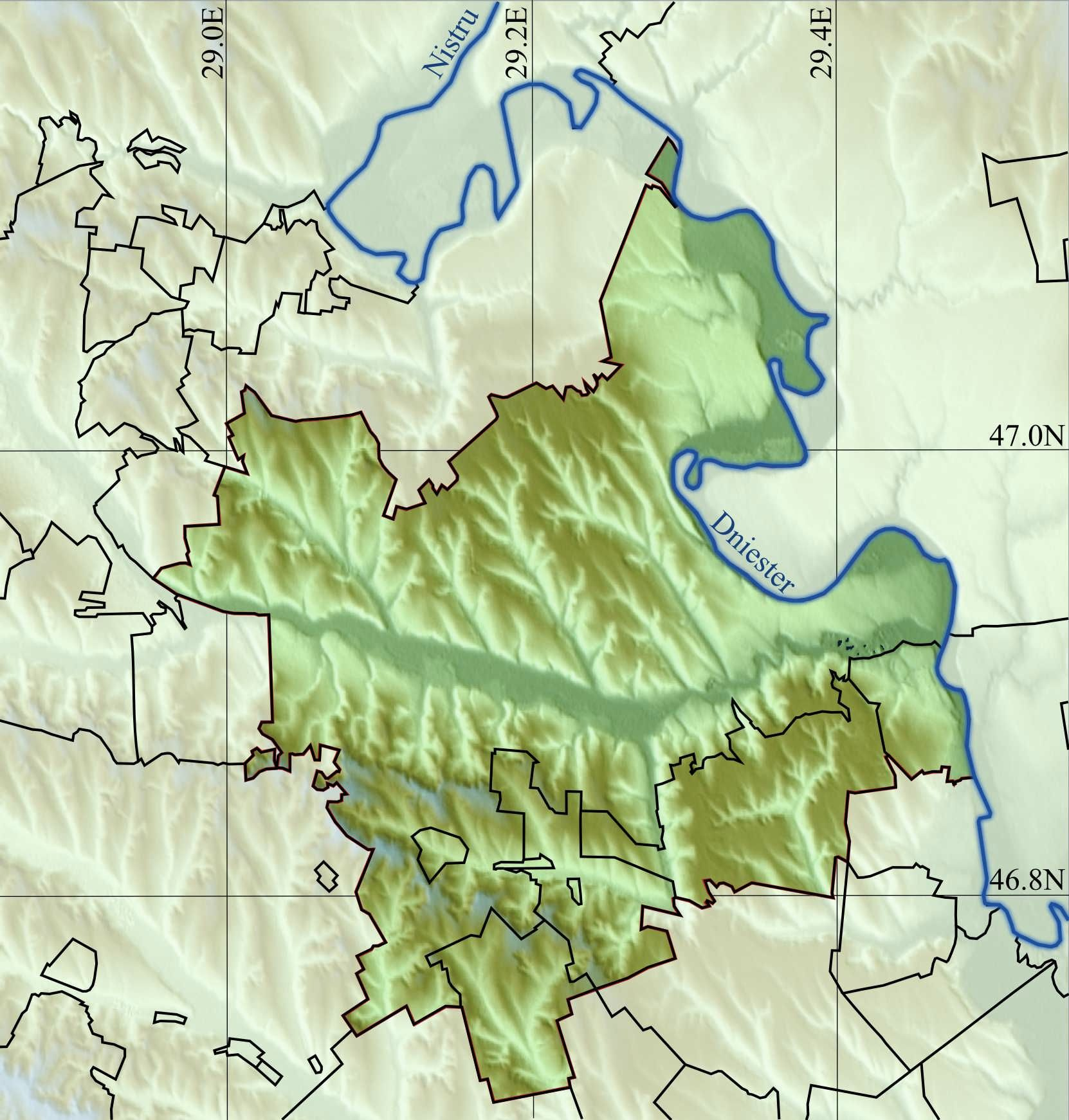
- Location within Anenii Noi District Location within Moldova
- Coordinates: 47°5′N 29°18′E
- Country: Moldova
- District: Ștefan Vodă District

Population (2014 census)
  - Total: 1,988
- Time zone: UTC+2 (EET)
  - Summer (DST): UTC+3 (EEST)
- Postal code: MD-6520
- Area code: +373 265

Delacău is a commune and village in the Anenii Noi District of Moldova.

== Notable people ==
- Veaceslav Negruță
