= Medeniyet Shahberdiyeva =

Turkmen opera singer (1930–2018)

Medeniyet Shahberdiyeva Medeniýet Şahberdiýewa
- Born: February 23, 1930; Kerki, Turkmen SSR, USSR (now Turkmenistan)
- Died: January 3, 2018 (aged 87) Ashgabat, Turkmenistan
- Genres: Opera
- Occupation: Opera singer

Medeniyet "Maya" Shahberdiyeva (Turkmen: Medeniýet "Maýa" Şahberdiýewa; 23 February 1930 – 3 January 2018) was a Turkmen opera singer of the Soviet era, known as the "Golden Voice of the Motherland" and the "Turkmen Nightingale".

Shahberdiyeva was born in Kerki, Lebap Province. She was orphaned at age 7, was raised in the orphanage in Mary, and in childhood was harassed by schoolboys who threw rocks at her due to her status as an orphan.

Upon admission to the Turkmen Music Boarding School, she began to study violin. In her youth she had learned to play the gyjak. However, upon admission to the Pedagogical Institute, she was denied admission to the violin program and told to matriculate in the Mathematics Department of Turkmen State University. Shahberdiyeva demonstrated her vocal talent to the instructors, and was admitted to the Music Department as a student of voice. After one year, she was transferred to Moscow to study at the Moscow State Tchaikovsky Conservatory. A coloratura soprano, she graduated from the conservatory in 1956, and beginning in 1962 she received further vocal lessons in Kiev. Later in life, she recalled, "It [music] completely changed my life.”

She was a featured soloist on the roster of the Turkmen Opera and Ballet Theater from 1956. Her repertoire included the title role in The Snow Maiden by Nikolai Rimsky-Korsakov; Marfa in The Tsar's Bride, also by Rimsky-Korsakov; Rosina in Il barbiere di Siviglia by Gioacchino Rossini; Violetta in La traviata by Giuseppe Verdi; the title role in Lakmé by Léo Delibes; Aylar in The End of the Bloody Watershed by Veli Mukhatov; Aknabat in Night of Alarm by Aman Agadzhikov; and Shasenem in Shasenem and Gharib by Adrian Shaposhnikov. She also performed in concert. During her career Shahberdiyeva traveled abroad as well as performing domestically. She was also named a deputy to the sixth and seventh convocations of the Supreme Soviet of the Turkmen SSR. She became an instructor at the Ashgabat Institute of Arts in 1975, the same year in which she was named a People's Artist of the USSR; she was also honored as a People's Artist of the Turkmen SSR for her work.

After Turkmenistan became independent in 1991, Shahberdiyeva continued to receive recognition from the government of Turkmenistan only following the death of Turkmenistan's first president, Saparmurat Niyazov, who banned opera and ballet as non-Turkmen, and closed the opera theater. During that period, until Niyazov's death in 2006, she taught voice to a small circle of students but performed only in private gatherings. She was the subject of a documentary which was shown in Ashgabat in 2008. In 2010, on occasion of her 80th birthday, she received the Golden Age Award, 3rd Degree, from the government.
