= Dávid Somfai Kara =

PhD Dávid Somfai Kara
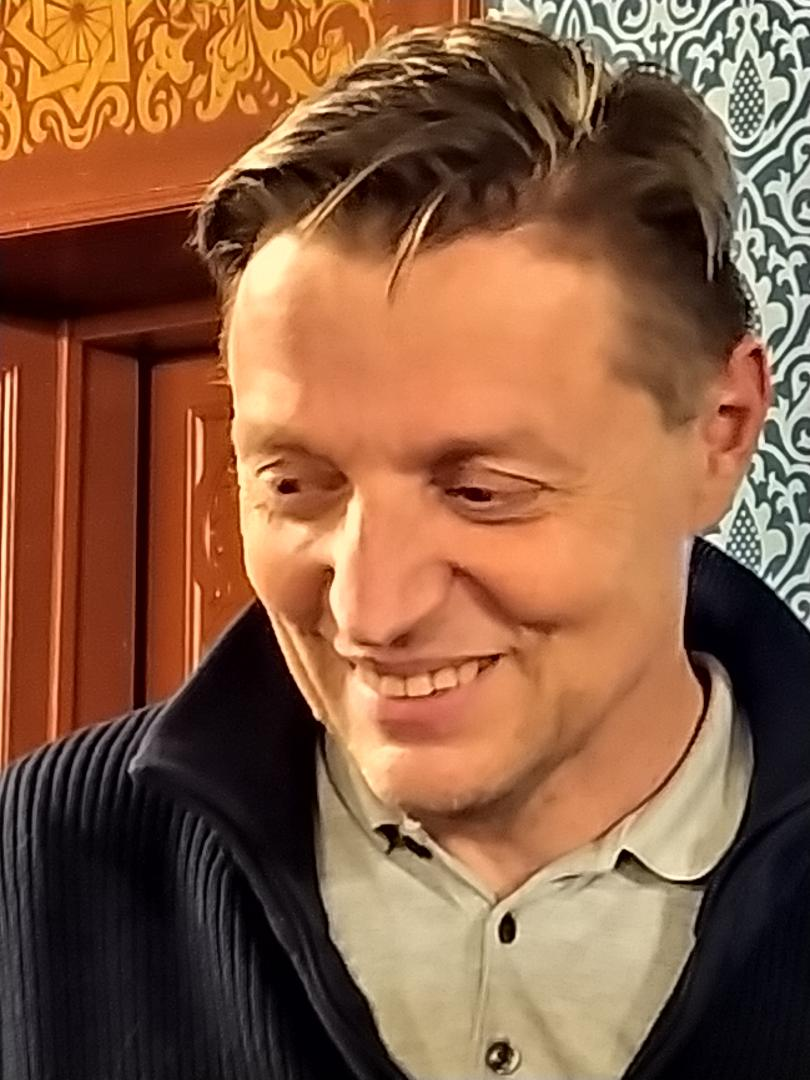
- Dávid Somfai Kara in 2023
- Born: 21 April 1969 (age 57); Budapest, Hungary
- Awards: Eötvös Scholarship in 2001; HAESF Senior Leaders and Scholars Fellowship in 2010

Academic background
- Education: Mongolian Orientalist performers
- Alma mater: Eötvös Loránd University

Academic work
- Discipline: Central Asian Linguistics and Ethnography
- Institutions: Nazarbayev University]

Dávid Somfai Kara (born 21 April 1969, Budapest, Hungary) is a Hungarian academic of linguistics and ethnography currently working in the Hungarian Academy of Sciences. He holds a Doctor of Philosophy degree, and his academic discipline focuses on the cultures and languages of the Central Asian people such as Turkic and Mongolic people. Apart from Central Asian Turkic (Kyrgyz, Kazakh etc.) and Mongolian languages, he has a knowledge of English and Russian languages. He also researched on and published several works regarding the folklore, tradition, mythology, and religion of those people.
