= Mähri Pirgulyýewa =

Turkmen singer (born 1988)

- Born: Mahri Pirguliyeva; 11 March 1988 (age 38); Ashkhabad, Turkmen SSR, USSR (now Ashgabat, Turkmenistan)
- Other names: Mahri; Myahri
- Occupations: Singer; songwriter
- Years active: 2007–present
- Children: 1
- Awards: Ýylyň parlak ýyldyzy 2018
- Musical career
- Genres: Pop; Turkmen traditional music; dance-pop
- Instrument: Vocals

Mährişka Pirgulyýewa (Turkmen Cyrillic: Мәхри Пиргулыева, IPA: [mæːxˈɾɪ pɪɾʁʊɫɯˈjɛβɑ]; Russian: Махри Пиркулиева, romanized: Makhri Pirkuliyeva; born 11 March 1988), known by her stage name Myahri (Russian: Мяхри, romanized: Myakhri), is a Turkmen pop singer.

== Biography ==
In 2018, she won the Grand Prix of the popular youth music contest "Ýylyň parlak ýyldyzy" ("The Brightest Star of the Year") in Turkmenistan, where she performed a song she composed herself, "Alaja".

In January 2020, she released a new music album, "Ýyldyz" ("The Star").

== Discography ==
Year	Album
2020	Ýyldyz
