= Ethnicities in Iran =

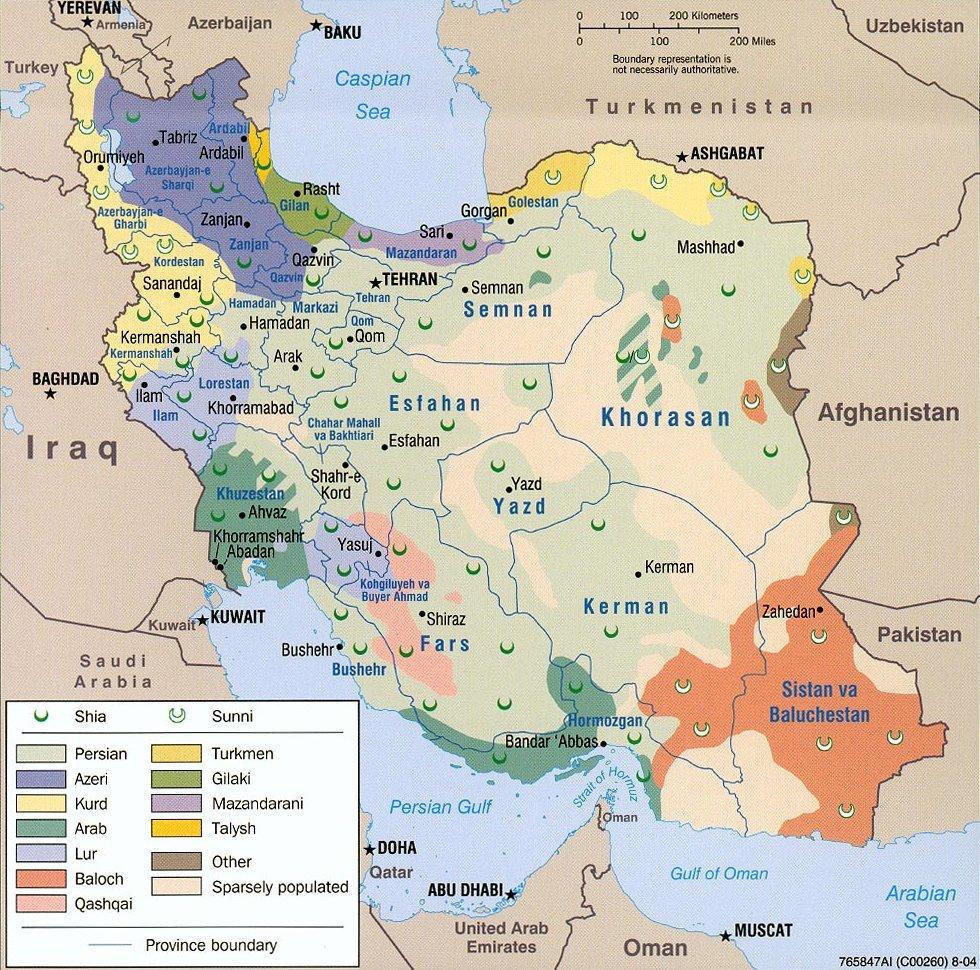
Ethnoreligious distribution of the people of Iran.

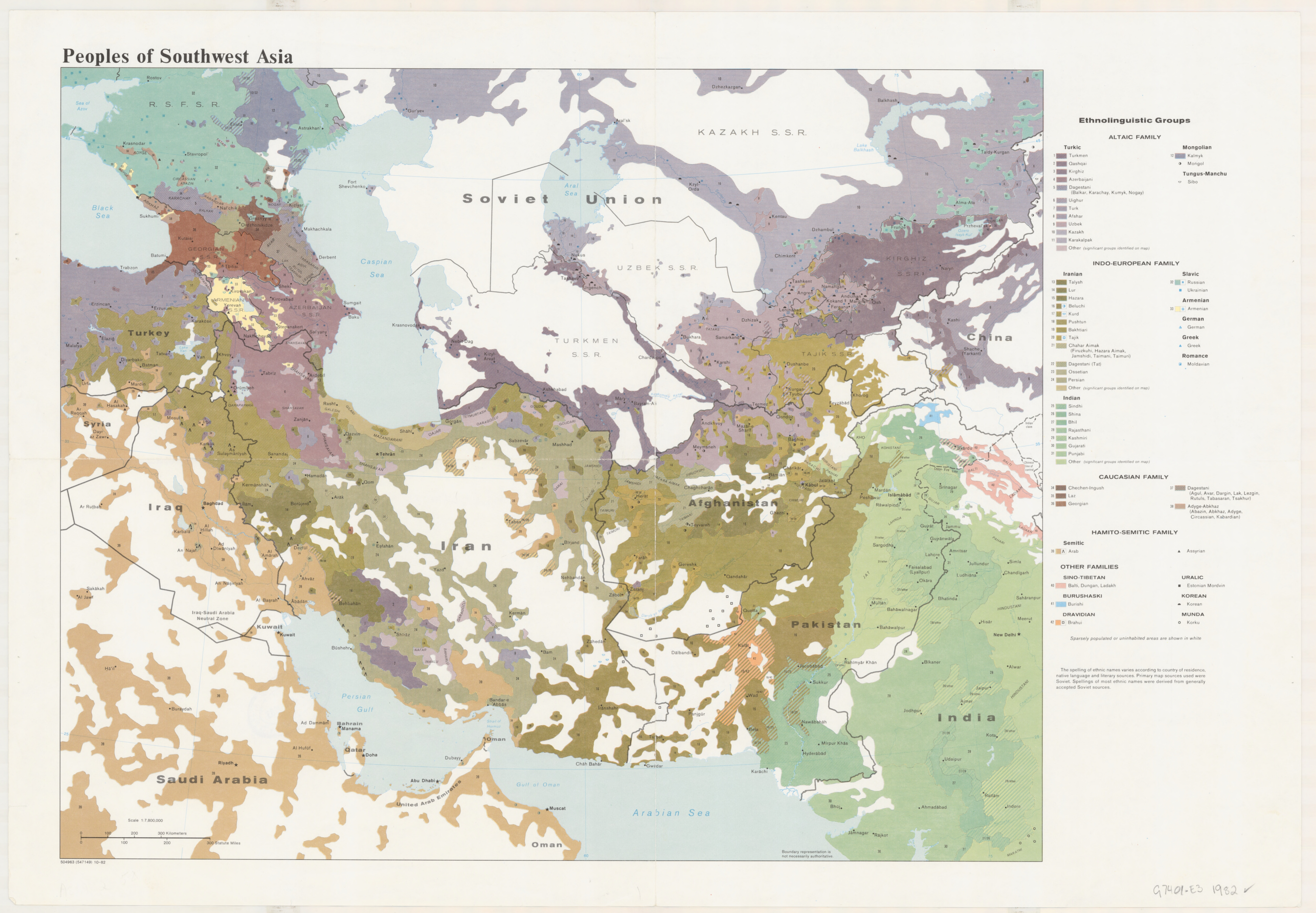
Ethnolinguistic distribution in Central and Southwest Asia of the Altaic, Caucasian, Afroasiatic and Indo-European families.

Iran hosts a variety of different ethnicities and languages. In Iranian society, there is a prevalent sense of social cohesion in which the various ethnic groups of the country, including Persians, and Lurs, Mazandaranis, Kurds, Azerbaijanis, Balochs, Gilaks, Arabs, Semnanis, Talysh etc, are not considered minorities, but are instead regarded as integral parts of the majority of the Iranian population and identity, with the lingua franca in the country among groups being Persian. Non-Persians account for near half of Iran's population, many of whom maintain distinct ethnic, linguistic, and cultural identities that distinguish them from the Persian population.

The majority of the population of Iran, approximately 80%, consists of Iranian peoples. The largest groups in this category include Persians, mostly referred to as Fars (who form 61% of the Iranian population) and Kurds (who form 17% of the Iranian population), with other communities including Semnanis, Larestanis, Gilakis, Laks, Mazandaranis, Lurs, Tats, Talysh and Baloch.

Turkic peoples constitute a substantial minority of around 16%, with the largest group being the Azerbaijanis. They are the third largest ethnicity in Iran. Other Turkic groups include the Turkmen, Afshar, Qashqai, Khorasani Turks, Shahsevan, Khalaj and Kazakhs peoples.

Iranian Arabs account for about 4% of the Iranian population. The remainder, amounting to about 1–1.5% of the Iranian population, consists of a variety of minor groups, mainly comprising Iranian Iraqis, Iranian Assyrians, Iranian Jews, Iranian Armenians, Iranian Georgians, Circassians, Afro-Iranians, and Mandaeans.

Iranian society is not uniform in terms of religion, and some ethnic groups are both Shia and Sunni. The largest number of Shia Muslims come from the Gilaki, Mazandarani, Fars, and Lor ethnic groups, followed by the Azerbaijanis. The largest number of Sunni Muslims is from the Turkmen and Baloch ethnic groups. The Kurds and Larestanis show a more balanced distribution between the two sects, with approximately half of each being Shia and the other half Sunni. A number of Iranians also follow the Zoroastrian faith, and Christianity is represented by Assyrians, Armenians and Iranian and Turkic converts.

At the beginning of the 20th century, Iran had a population of just below 10 million, with an approximate ethnic composition of: 6 million Persians (47%), 2.5 million Azerbaijanis (25%), 1.2 million Kurds and Baluchs each (12% each).

Many of the traditional tribal groups have become urbanized and culturally assimilated in the 19th and 20th centuries, so that ethnic identity in many cases is less than clear-cut. There has also been considerable intermarriage rates between certain groups. Nearly all groups are fluent in Persian, in many cases marginalizing their traditional native tongue. Some groups may identify with their status as "ethnic minority" only secondarily, or cite multiple ethnic affiliations.

== Iranian peoples ==
=== Semnani people ===
The Semnani people are a Caspian people part of the greater Iranian peoples who primarily live in northern Iran and speak the Semnani language. They inhabit the province of Semnan, east of Tehran. Today, the majority of Semnanis speak Persian as secondary language.

=== Persians ===
A CIA World Factbook estimate from 2007 and Library of Congress estimate from 2008 put Persians, most commonly known as Fars, at 61% of the population of the country.

=== Achums ===
The Achums, also known as Larestani people are Iranian peoples who inhabit Southern Iran (primarily Irahistan, Larestan region, and Bastak), with some migrations that occurred to Shiraz and the Arab States of the Persian Gulf. The Larestani (Achomi) homeland is located in the southern halves of both Fars and Bushehr provinces, as well as the western half of Hormozgan and southwestern part of Kerman provinces. The Achomi area includes the cities of Lar, Lamerd, Evaz, Gerash, Khonj, Mohr, Juyom, Zarrindasht and Darab in Fars province, and Asaluyeh, Jam and Dayyer in Bushehr province as well as Parsian, Bastak, Bandar Lengeh, Khamir, Rudan, Minab, Bandar Sirik and parts of Bandar Abbas, Bashagard and Jask in Hormozgan province.

=== Kurds ===
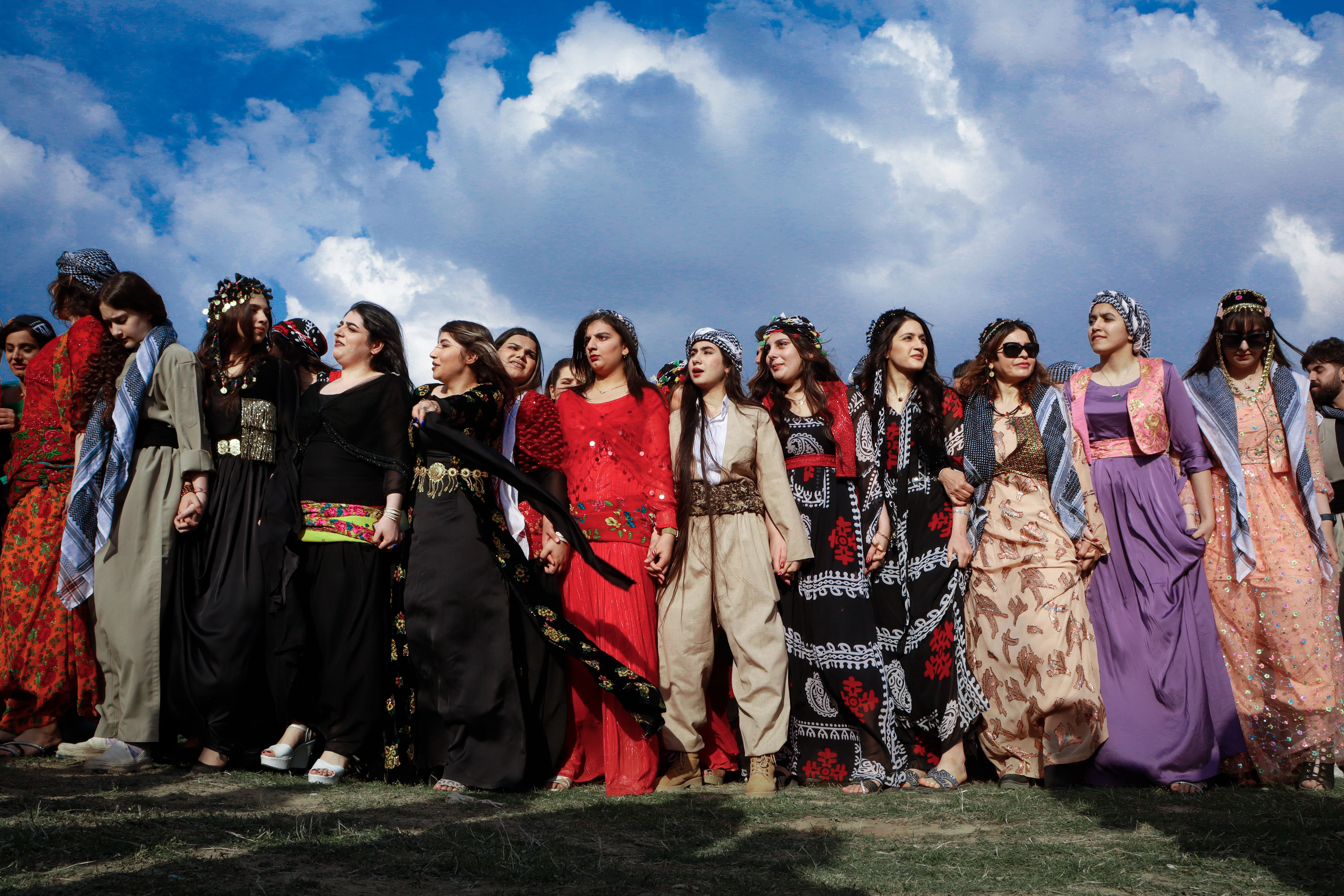
Kurdish women celebrating Nowruz in Iranian Kurdistan

The Kurds are Iranian people, who make up the majority of the population of Kurdistan, Ilam, Kermanshah provinces and along with the Azerbaijanis, they are one of the two main ethnic groups in West Azerbaijan province. The northern part of Lorestan province is inhabited by Kurdish Lak people. Kurdish people also make up the plurality of the North Khorasan province and a minority in Razavi Khorasan and are scattered throughout many other provinces of Iran. It is estimated that up to 1 million Kurmanj Kurds live in Razavi Khorasan. Moreover, the previously Kurdish-speaking Modanloo and Pazuki tribes in Mazandaran and Tehran provinces became Persianized and are Persian-speaking now. Kurds make up around 17-18% of Iran's population.

=== Laks ===
The Laks inhabit a large part of Lorestan province where they constitute over 65% of the population and most of the eastern regions of the neighboring province of Kermanshah, and some parts of western Ilam (Poshte-Kuhi Laks). The area to the east of Mount Kabir is known as Pishe-Kuh, and west of the mountain is known as Poshte-Kuh.

=== Lurs ===
The Lurs speak the Luri language and inhabit parts of west – south western Iran. Most Lur are Shi’a. They are the fourth largest ethnic group in Iran after the Persians, Azerbaijani, and Kurds. They occupy Lorestan, Chaharmahal and Bakhtiari, Khuzestan, Hamadan, Markazi, Ilam, Isfahan, Fars, Bushehr and Kuh-Gilu-Boir Ahmed provinces. The authority of tribal elders remains a strong influence among the nomadic population. It is not as dominant among the settled urban population. As is true in Bakhtiari and Kurdish societies, Lur women have much greater freedom than women in other groups within the region.

The Luri language is Indo-European. The Sharafnama of Sharaf Khan Bidlisi "mentioned two Lur dynasties among the five Kurdish dynasties that had in the past enjoyed royalty or the highest form of sovereignty or independence." In the Mu'jam Al-Buldan of Yaqut al-Hamawi mention is made of the Lurs as a Kurdish tribe living in the mountains between Khuzestan and Isfahan. The term Kurd according to Richard Frye was used for all Iranian nomads (including the population of Luristan as well as tribes in Kuhistan and Baluchis in Kerman) for all nomads, whether they were linguistically connected to the Kurds or not.

=== Mazanderanis ===
The Mazanderanis or Tabari people are an Iranian people whose homeland is the North of Iran (Tabaristan). Like the closely related Gilaks, the Mazanderanis are a Caspian people who inhabit the south coast of the Caspian Sea, part of the historical region that used to be called Tabaristan and are currently one of the main ethnic groups residing in the northern parts of Iran. They speak the Mazandarani language, a language native to around 4 million people, but all of them can speak Persian. The Alborz mountains mark the southern boundary of Mazanderani settlement.

The Mazanderani peoples number differs between three million and four million (2006 estimate) and many of them are farmers and fishermen. Mazanderanis form also the majority in the eastern parts of Tehran province, in Firuzkuh, Damavand and parts of Shemiranat (Rudbar-e Qasran). Also the cities of Bandar-e Gaz and Kordkuy in Golestan province and the city of Shahmirzad in Semnan province are inhabited by Mazanderanis. The city of Gurgan was previously Mazandarani-speaking but is now a Farsi-speaking city.

=== Gilaks ===
The Gilaks are an Iranian people native to the northern Iran province of Gilan and are one of the main ethnic groups residing in the northern part of Iran. Gilaks, along with the closely related Mazandarani people, comprise part of the Caspian people, who inhabit the southern and southwestern coastal regions of the Caspian Sea. They speak the Gilaki language and their population is estimated to be between three and four million (4% of the population). Gilaki people live both alongside the Alborz mountains, and in the surrounding plains. Consequentially, those living along the northern side of the Alborz mountains tend to raise livestock, while those living in the plains farm. Gilaks play an important role in provincial and national economy, supplying a large portion of the region's agricultural staples, such as rice, grains, tobacco and tea. Other major industries include fishing and caviar exports, and the production of silk. Gilaki people also inhabit the western parts of Mazandaran province, namely the cities of Ramsar and Tonekabon.

=== Talysh ===
The Talysh are an Iranian people. The Talysh of Iran number at about 430,000 and live mostly in the province of Gilan in north of Iran. They are indigenous to a region shared between Republic of Azerbaijan and Iran which spans the South Caucasus and the southwestern shore of the Caspian Sea. Another significant amount of Talysh live therefore also in the Republic of Azerbaijan. The Iranian cities of Hashtpar, Rezvanshahr, Fuman and Masuleh and parts of Astara are Talysh-speaking.

=== Tats ===
The Tats are an Iranian people. The Tats of Iran are centralised near the Alborz Mountains, especially in the south of Qazvin province. They speak the Tati language, consisting of a group of northwestern Iranian dialects closely related to the Talysh language. Persian and Azerbaijani are also spoken. Tats of Iran are mainly Shia Muslims and about 300,000 population. (Note: it is also spoken in some villages like Vafs and Chehreghan in the central areas of Iran like Gholamhossein Mosahab's The Persian Encyclopedia) A large part of Qazvin province and the majority of Takestan county is inhabited by Tat people.

=== Baloch ===
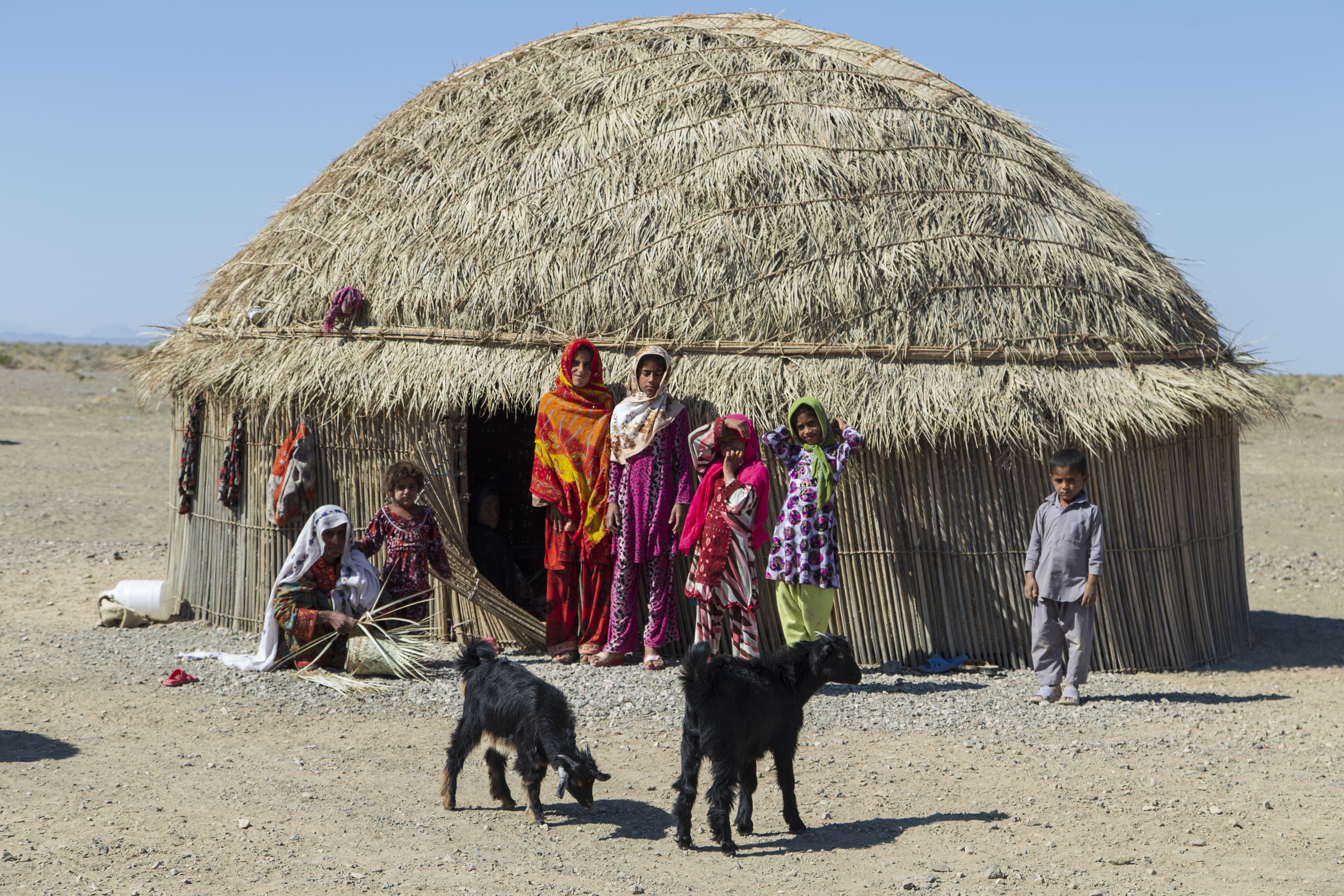
Baloch people in Iran

The Balochs are an Iranian people. The Balochis of Iran live in southern and central parts of Sistan and Baluchestan province, one of the most remote and isolated areas of Iran, especially from the majority of the people. The northern part of the province is called Sistan and 63% of the population are ethnic Baloch while the rest are Persian Sistani. The Baloch are Sunni Muslims with a minority who are Shia, in contrast to the Sistani Persians who are adherents of Shia Islam. The capital of Sistan and Baluchestan is Zahedan and is inhabited by Baloch people, the next largest city of the province is Zabol in Sistan and is inhabited predominantly by Sistani Persians. The town of Jask in neighbouring Hormozgan province is also inhabited by Baloch people. Baloch people also make up a minority in the eastern parts of Kerman, Razavi Khorasan and South Khorasan (Khorasani Baloch). Balochs also make up about 30% of the populations of both Mazandaran and Golestan provinces.

== Turkic peoples ==
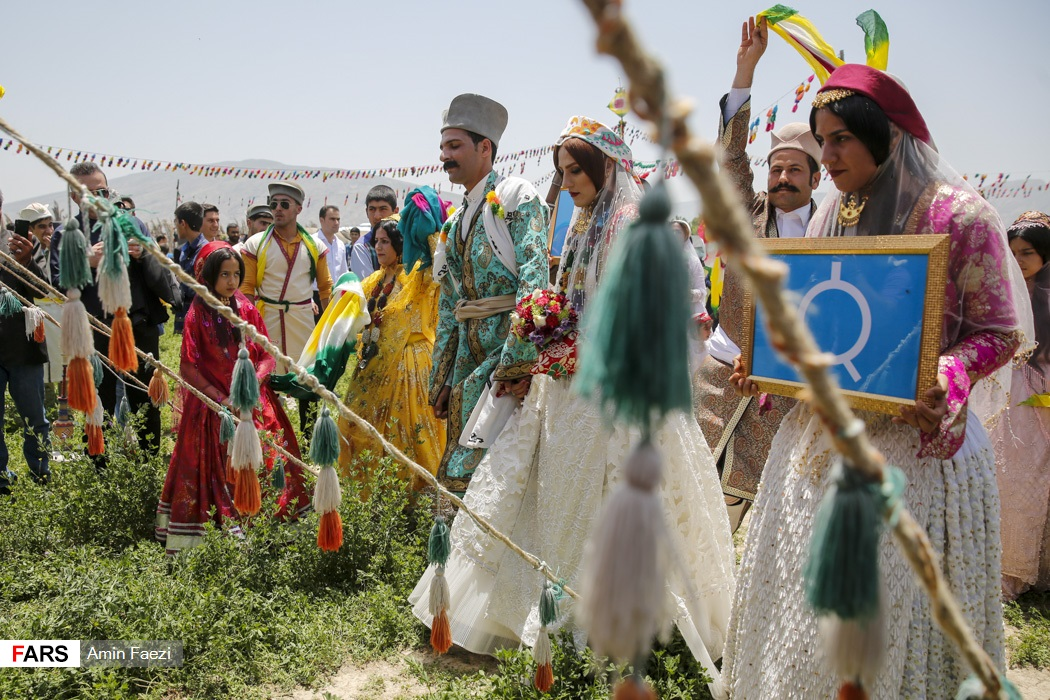
A traditional Qashqai wedding ceremony

The largest Turkic-speaking group in Iran are the Iranian Azerbaijanis, forming the second largest ethnicity in the nation after the Persians. Smaller Turkic groups account for about 2% of Iranian population between them, about half of this number is accounted for by the Iranian Turkmen, the other half comprises various tribal confederacies such as the Qashqai or the Khorasani Turks. According to an estimation presented by the anthropologist Sekandar Amanolahi in peer-reviewed journal Iran and the Caucasus, the number of Iranian Turkophones "does not exceed 9 millions". According to Victoria Arakelova, Turkic peoples in Iran can be differentiated between "proper Turkic groups (the Turkmens par excellence) and the Turkic-speaking ethnic Iranians, predominantly the Azeris".

=== Azerbaijanis ===
Many sources assert that Iranian Azerbaijanis are a Turkic-speaking people of Iranian origin. Estimated numbers or percentages vary significantly and many estimates cited appear to be politically motivated. They are often considered the second largest ethnic group in Iran and the largest ethnic minority with approximately 16% of the population.

In the historic Azerbaijan region, the population consists mainly of Azerbaijanis. Azerbaijanis form the largest ethnic group in Iranian Azerbaijan, while Kurds are the second largest group and a majority in many cities of West Azerbaijan province. Iranian Azerbaijan is one of the most densely populated regions of Iran. Many of these various linguistic, religious, and tribal minority groups, and Azerbaijanis themselves have settled widely outside the region. The majority of Azerbaijanis are followers of Shi'a Islam.

Iranian Azerbaijanis mainly reside in the northwest provinces, including the Iranian Azerbaijan provinces (East Azerbaijan, West Azerbaijan, Ardabil, and Zanjan), as well as regions of the North to Hamadan County and Shara District in the East Hamadan province, and some regions of Qazvin province. Some Azerbaijani minorities also live in Markazi, Kordestan, Gilan and Kermanshah provinces.^{h}

Azerbaijanis also make up significant minorities in parts of central Iran, especially Tehran, (Note: Some estimates have suggested that one-third of the population of Tehran is Azerbaijani, the Iranologist Victoria Arakelova however notes in peer-reviewed journal Iran and the Caucasus that the wide-spread "cliché" among residents of Tehran on the number of Azerbaijanis in the city ("half of Tehran consists of Azerbaijanis"), cannot be taken "seriously into consideration". Arakelova adds that the number of Tehran's inhabitants who have migrated from northwestern areas of Iran, who are currently Persian-speakers "for the most part", is not more than "several hundred thousands", with the maximum being one million.) Azerbaijanis have also emigrated and resettled in large numbers in Khorasan and Qom. Immigrant Azerbaijani communities have been represented by people prominent not only among urban and industrial working classes but also in commercial, administrative, political, religious, and intellectual circles.

=== Turkmen ===
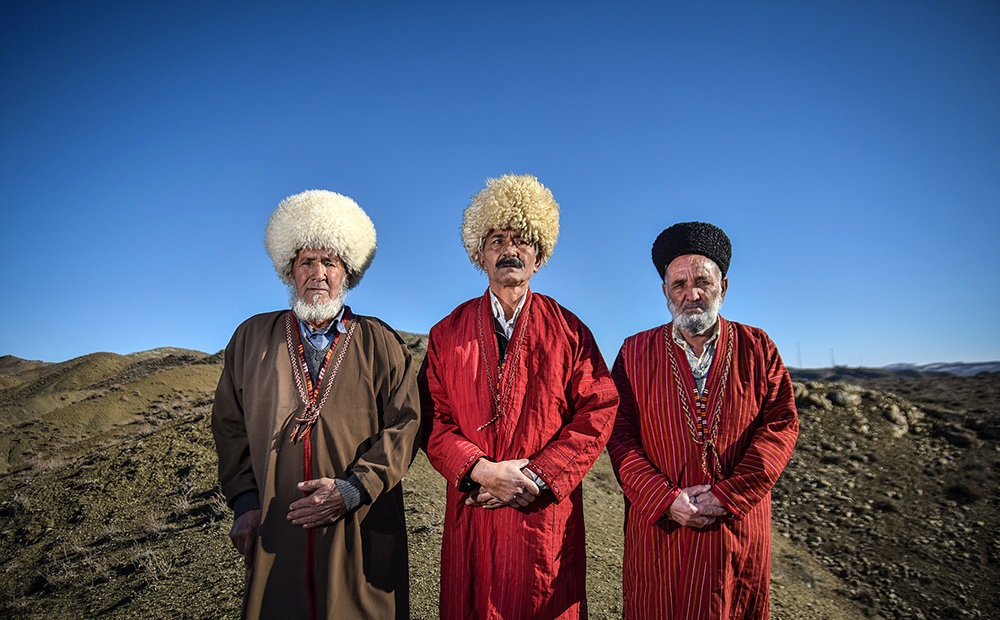
Turkmen men in North Khorasan

Iranian Turkmens are primarily concentrated in the provinces of Golestān and North Khorasan. The largest Turkmen city in Iran is Gonbad-e Kavoos, followed by Bandar Torkaman. Iranian Turkmens are mostly Sunni Muslims with some Shia.

=== Qashqai ===
The Qashqai people mainly live in the provinces of Fars, Khuzestan and southern Isfahan, especially around the city of Shiraz in Fars. They speak the Qashqai language which is a member of the Turkic family of languages. The Qashqai were originally nomadic pastoralists and some remain so today. The traditional nomadic Qashqai travelled with their flocks each year from the summer highland pastures north of Shiraz roughly 480 km or 300 mi south to the winter pastures on lower (and warmer) lands near the Persian Gulf, to the southwest of Shiraz. The majority have now become partially or wholly sedentary. The trend towards settlement has been increasing markedly since the 1960s. The largest Qashqai city in Iran is Firuzabad. In Chaharmahal, the cities of Boldaji, Sefiddasht, Ben and Sudjan are inhabited by Qashqai people.

=== Khorasani Turks ===
The Khorasani Turks are Turkic-speaking people inhabiting parts of north-eastern Iran, and in the neighbouring regions of Turkmenistan up to beyond the Amu Darya River. They speak the Khorasani Turkic and live in North Khorasan, Razavi Khorasan, and Golestan provinces alongside Turkmens.

=== Khalaj ===
Khalaj people are a Turkic ethnic group who mainly reside in small parts of Markazi and Qom provinces. The largest cities inhabited by Khalaj people are Komijan, Khondab and Dastjerd (known as Khalajestan).

== Arabs ==
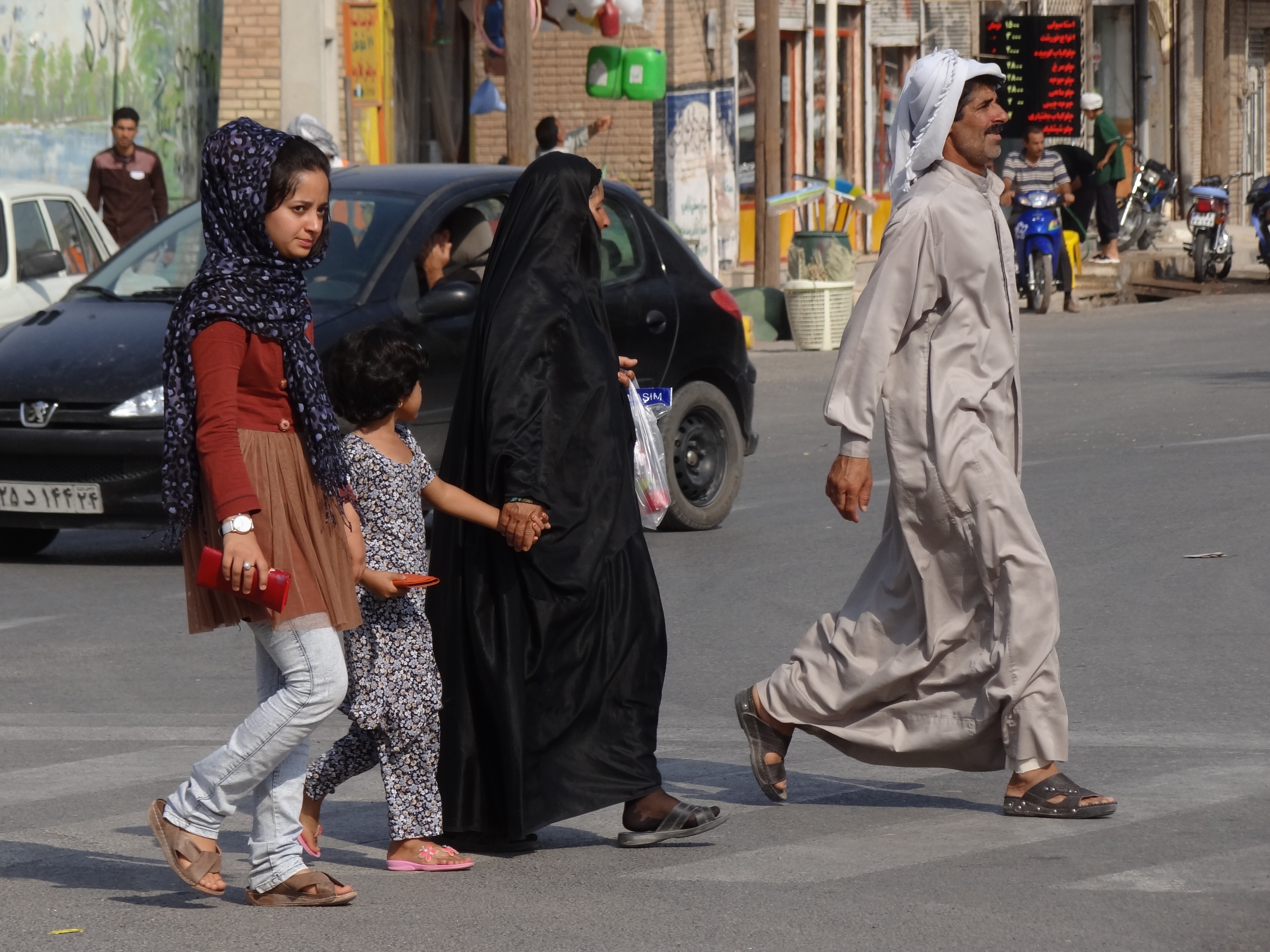
Iranian Arabs in Khuzestan

Roughly 4% of Iran's citizens are Arabs. A 1998 report by UNCHR reported 4 million of them live in cities of Khuzestan province, most of whom are Shia Muslims. Along with the Persians, Arabs are one of the two main ethnic groups in Ahvaz. Khuzestan province is inhabited by Arab, Lur, and Bakhtiari ethnic groups. There are smaller communities in Qom where there are a significant number of Arabs being of Lebanese descent, as well as Razavi Khorasan and Fars provinces. Iranian Arab communities are also found in Bahrain, Iraq, Lebanon, Kuwait, United Arab Emirates, and Qatar.

== Assyrians ==
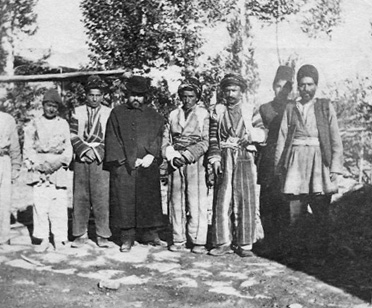
Assyrians in Urmia, Iran.

The Assyrian people of Iran are an ancient Semitic-speaking people who speak modern Assyrian, a neo-Aramaic language, and are Eastern Rite Christians belonging mostly to the Assyrian Church of the East and, to a lesser extent, to the Chaldean Catholic Church, Syriac Orthodox Church and Ancient Church of the East. They descend from the ancient peoples of Mesopotamia. They share a common identity, rooted in shared linguistic and religious traditions, with Assyrians in Iraq and elsewhere in the Middle East such as Syria and Turkey, as well as with the Assyrian diaspora.

Assyrian connections to Iran go back to the Iron Age when the Neo-Assyrian Empire (935–609 BC) ruled over the Persians, Medes and Elamites. The Assyrian community in Iran was significant prior to the Assyrian Genocide committed by the Ottomans in World War I, and still numbered approximately 250,000 prior to the Iranian Revolution of 1979. After the revolution many Assyrians left the country, primarily for the United States, and the 1996 census counted only 32,000 Assyrians.

Current estimates of the Assyrian population in Iran range from 32,000 (as of 2005) to 50,000 (as of 2007). The Iranian capital, Tehran, is home to the majority of Iranian Assyrians; however, approximately 15,000 Assyrians reside in northern Iran, in Urmia and various Assyrian villages in the surrounding area. The city of Nushin in Urumia county is inhabited by Assyrian people.

== Jews ==
Judaism is one of the oldest religions practiced in Iran and dates back to late biblical times. The biblical books of Isaiah, Daniel, Ezra, Nehemiah, Chronicles, and Esther contain references to the life and experiences of Jews in Iran.

By various estimates, 10,800 Jews remain in Iran, mostly in Tehran, Isfahan, and Shiraz. Historically, Jews maintained a presence in many more Iranian cities. Iran contains the largest Jewish population of any Muslim majority country except Turkey.

A number of groups of Jews of Iran have split off since ancient times. They are now recognized as separate communities, such as the Bukharan Jews and Mountain Jews. In addition, there are several thousand in Iran who are, or who are the direct descendants of, Jews who have converted to Islam and the Bahá'í Faith.

== Mandaeans ==
Iranian Mandaeans live mainly in the Khuzestan province in southern Iran, and like the Assyrians with whom they share close genetic and linguistic ties, are of ancient Mesopotamian heritage. Mandeans are a Mandaic-speaking ethno-religious group who follow their own distinctive Gnostic, monotheistic religion called Mandaeism, sometimes also known as Sabianism (after the mysterious Sabians mentioned in the Quran, a name historically claimed by several religious groups). They venerate John the Baptist (Yaḥyā ibn Zakarīyā) as their greatest prophet. They number approximately 10,000 people in Iran, though Al Arabiya has put their number as high as 60,000 in 2011.

== Caucasus-derived groups ==
=== Armenians ===
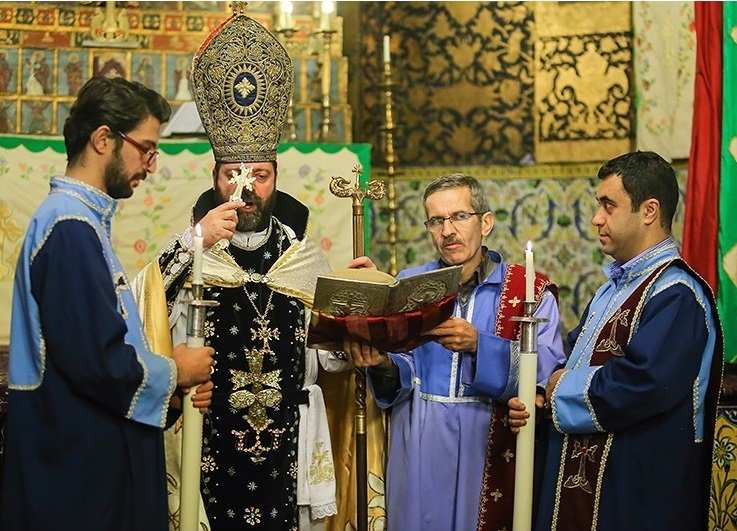
New Year's Eve celebrations at the Armenian Apostolic Vank Cathedral in Isfahan, 2018

Armenian settlements in Iran dates back millennia. Ever since antiquity, Armenians and Iranians have always had significant interactions with each other. These interactions include cultural, linguistic, economic, and more.

Armenians used to inhabit a large portion of modern-day northern Iran, most significantly on the western shores of Lake Urmia.

Armenians and Iranians shared many cultural and religious characteristics. Before the 3rd century AD, no other country had as much influence over Armenia as Parthia. Intermarriage between the Parthian and Armenian nobility was very common, and for a large portion of Armenian history, much of Armenia was ruled by the modern-day Iranians.

The newly formed Armenian community in Isfahan played a considerable role in Iran's economic and cultural development. Shah Abbas I granted the Armenians monopoly over silk and gave them many other trade incentives. Thus, the Armenian community quickly became very wealthy. The Armenians were given these trade incentives due to the immense trade routes they covered around the globe. Armenians were also known for their honesty regarding trade. The policies of Shah Abbas proved to be very successful for the Iranian economy, where after a brief period of time, the Iranian economy was booming.

After the success of the Armenian community in New Julfa, the Armenians of New Julfa migrated to other major countries. They formed other settlements connecting many of these newly formed Armenian settlements to Isfahan, Iran. These settlements were in the Philippines, India, Venice, France, Spain, the Netherlands, and Russia. Thus, all these led to creating a new age for Iran where Iranian goods traveled the world and were consumed by Europeans and Indians.

The current Iranian-Armenian population is approximately 500,000. They mostly live in Tehran and Jolfa district. After the Iranian revolution, many Armenians immigrated to Armenian diasporic communities in North America and western Europe. Today the Armenians are Iran's largest Christian religious minority, followed by Assyrians.

=== Georgians ===
Iranian Georgians are Twelver Shia Muslims, whereas the vast majority of Georgians elsewhere in the world are Christian.

The Georgian language is the only Caucasian language fully functioning in Iran and it's spoken only by those that live in Fereydan and Fereydunshahr, and in smaller pockets all over Iran. Almost all other communities of Iranian Georgians in Iran have already lost their language, but retain a clear Georgian identity.

Once a very large minority in Iran mainly due to mass deportations by the various early modern age and modern age Iranian empires (Safavids, Afsharids, and Qajars), of their Georgian subjects, nowadays, due to intermarrying and assimilating the number of Georgians in Iran is estimated to be over 100,000.

The Georgian language is still used by many of the Georgians in Iran. The centre of Georgians in Iran is Fereydunshahr, a small city 150 km to the west of Isfahan. The western part of Isfahan province is historically called Fereydan. In this area there are 10 Georgian towns and villages around Fereydunshahr. In this region the old Georgian identity is retained the best compared to other places in Iran. In many major Iranian cities, such as Tehran, Isfahan, Karaj and Shiraz, and Rasht live Georgians too.

In many other places such as Najafabad, Rahmatabad, Yazdanshahr and Amir Abad (near Isfahan) there are also Georgian pockets and villages. In Mazandaran province in northern Iran, there are ethnic Georgians too. They live in the town of Behshahr, and also in Behshahr county, in Farah Abad, and many other places, which are usually called "Gorji Mahale" (Georgian Neighbourhood). Most of these Georgians no longer speak the Georgian language, but retain aspects of Georgian culture and a Georgian identity. Some argue that Iranian Georgians retain remnants of Christian traditions, but there is no evidence for this.

=== Circassians ===
Like with the Georgians, once a very large minority in Iran all the way from the Safavid to the Qajar era, the vast majority of the Circassians have been assimilated into the population nowadays. However, significant numbers remain present, and they are the second-largest Caucasian ethnic group in the nation after the Georgians.

From Sir John Chardin's "Travels in Persia, 1673–1677":

There is scarce a Gentleman in Persia, whose Mother is not a Georgian, or a Circassian Woman; to begin with the King, who commonly is a Georgian, or a Circassian by the Mother's side.

Circassians alongside the Georgians were imported en masse by the Shahs to fulfil roles in the civil administration, the military, and the royal Harem, but also as craftsmen, farmers, amongst other professions. Circassian women were both in Ottoman Turkey and Persia desired for their beauty, while the men were known as fearsome warriors. Notable Iranians of Circassian descent of the past include Teresia Sampsonia, Shah Abbas II, Shah Suleiman I, Pari Khan Khanum (daughter of Shah Tahmasp, involved in many court intrigues), Shamkhal Sultan, Jamshid Beg (the assassinator of Shah Ismail II), and Anna Khanum.

Traces of Circassian settlements have lasted into the 20th century, and small pockets still exist scattered over the country, even after centuries of absorbing and assimilating, such as in Fars, Rasht, Aspas, Gilan, Mazandaran, and the capital Tehran (due to contemporary internal migration). Their total number nowadays is unknown due to heavy assimilation and lack of censuses based on ethnicity, but are known to be significant. Due to the same assimilation however, no sizeable number speaks the Circassian language anymore.

== Current policy ==
The Constitution of Iran guarantees freedom of cultural expression and linguistic diversity. Many Iranian provinces have radio and television stations in local language or dialect. School education is in Persian, the official language, but use of regional languages is allowed under the constitution of the Islamic Republic, and Azerbaijani language and culture is studied at universities and other institutions of higher education. Article 15 of the constitution states:

The Official Language and script of Iran, the lingua franca of its people, is Persian. Official documents, correspondence, and texts, as well as text-books, must be in this language and script. However, the use of regional and tribal languages in the press and mass media, as well as for teaching of their literature in schools, is allowed in addition to Persian

Further, Article 19 of the Iranian constitution adds:

All people of Iran, whatever the ethnic group or tribe to which they belong, enjoy equal rights; color, race, language, and the like, do not bestow any privilege.

There is in fact, a considerable publication (book, newspaper, etc.) taking place in the two largest minority languages in the Azerbaijani language and Kurdish, and in the academic year 2004–05 B.A. programmes in the Azerbaijani language and literature (in Tabriz) and in the Kurdish language and literature (in Sanandaj) are offered in Iran for the very first time. In addition, Payame Noor University, which has 229 campuses and nearly 190,000 students throughout the country, in 2008 declared that Arabic will be the "second language" of the university, and that all its services will be offered in Arabic, concurrent with Persian.

Regional and local radio programmes are broadcast in Arabic, Armenian, Assyrian, Azerbaijani, Baluchi, Bandari, Georgian, Persian, Kurdish, Mazandarani, Turkoman, and Turkish.

However, some human rights groups have accused the Iranian government of violating the constitutional guarantees of equality, and the UN General Assembly has voiced its concern over "increasing discrimination and other human rights violations against ethnic and religious minorities." In a related report, Amnesty International says:

Despite constitutional guarantees of equality, individuals belonging to minorities in Iran, who are believed to number about half of the population of about 70 millions, are subject to an array of discriminatory laws and practices. These include land and property confiscations, denial of state and para-statal employment under the gozinesh criteria and restrictions on social, cultural, linguistic and religious freedoms which often result in other human rights violations such as the imprisonment of prisoners of conscience, grossly unfair trials of political prisoners before Revolutionary Courts, corporal punishment and use of the death penalty, as well as restrictions on movement and denial of other civil rights.

Some Western journalists and commentators have expressed similar views. John Bradley is of the opinion that:

Iran’s ethnic minorities share a widespread sense of discrimination and deprivation toward the central Tehran government. Tehran’s highly centralized development strategy has resulted in a wide socioeconomic gap between the center and the peripheries, where there is also an uneven distribution of power, socioeconomic resources, and sociocultural status. Fueled by these long-standing economic and cultural grievances against Tehran, unrest among the country’s large groups of ethnic minorities is increasing.' The violence in remote regions such as Khuzestan and Baluchistan clearly has ethnic components, but the far greater causes of the poverty and unemployment that vexes members of those ethnic groups are government corruption, inefficiency, and a general sense of lawlessness, which all Iranians, including Persians, must confront.

Separatist tendencies, led by some groups such as the Kurdish Democratic Party of Iran and Komalah in Iranian Kurdistan, for example, had led to frequent unrest and occasional military crackdown throughout the 1990s and even to the present. In Iran, Kurds have twice had their own autonomous regions independent of central government control: The Republic of Mahabad in Iran which was the second independent Kurdish state of the 20th century, after the Republic of Ararat in modern Turkey; and the second time after the Iranian revolution in 1979.

Jalal Talabani leader of the Iraqi Patriotic Union of Kurdistan (PUK), in a 1998 interview, contrasted the situation in Iran with that of Turkey, with respect to Kurds:

Iran never tried to obliterate the Kurd's identity. There is a province in Iran called Kordestan province. The Iranian name their planes after the province in Iran [including Kordestan]".

== Foreign involvement ==
One of the major internal policy challenges during the centuries up until now for most or all Iranian governments has been to find the appropriate and balanced approach to the difficulties and opportunities caused by this diversity, particularly as this ethnic or sectarian divisions have often been readily utilized by foreign powers, notably during the Iran–Iraq War. According to Professor Richard Frye:

Although many languages and dialects are spoken in the country, and different forms of social life, the dominant influence of the Persian language and culture has created a solidarity complex of great strength. This was revealed in the Iran–Iraq War when Arabs of Khuzestan did not join the invaders, and earlier when Azerbaijanis did not rally to their northern cousins after World War II, when Soviet forces occupied Azerbaijan. Likewise the Baluch, Turkmen, Armenians and Kurds, although with bonds to their kinsmen on the other side of borders, are conscious of the power and richness of Persian culture and willing to participate in it.

Foreign governments, both before and after the Islamic Revolution have often been accused of attempting to de-stabilize Iran through exploiting ethnic tensions.

In 2006, U.S. Marine Corps Intelligence commissioned two research projects into Iraqi and Iranian ethnic groups.

Ahwazi Arabs dissidents in Iran have been persecuted by the Iranian authorities, with a number of activists reporting being arrested, imprisoned, tortured, and forced to give false confessions.

Some Iranians accuse Britain of "trying to topple the regime by supporting insurgents and separatists". Other states however are also believed to be involved in the politics of ethnicity in southern Iran. Professor Efraim Karsh traces out the origins of Saddam Hussein's wish to annex Khuzestan using the ethnic card:

Nor did Saddam's territorial plans go beyond the Shatt al-Arab and a small portion of the southern region of Khuzestan, where he hoped, the substantial Arab minority would rise against their Iranian oppressors. This did not happen. The underground Arab organization in Khuzestan proved to be a far cry from the mass movement anticipated by the Iraqis, and Arab masses remained conspicuously indifferent to their would-be liberators

During Iran's 1979 revolution, after sending thousands of Iraqi Shi'ites into exile in Iran and the quick and brutal suppression of Kurdish dissent,

Saddam Hussein saw an opportunity to take advantage of Iran 's instability during its political transition and the weakness of its military (which had been decimated through regular purges of military officers once loyal to the former regime) in order to seize Iran 's oil-rich, primarily Arab-populated Khuzestan province. Hussein had wrongly expected the Iranian Arabs to join the Arab Iraqi forces and win a quick victory for Iraq.

During the Cold War, the Soviet Union's "tentacles extended into Iranian Kurdistan". As the main supporter of ethnic communist enclaves such as the Republic of Mahabad, and (later on) as the main arms supplier of Saddam Hussein, both the Soviet Union and its predecessor the Russian Empire, made many attempts to divide Iran along ethnic lines. Moscow's policies were specifically devised "in order to sponsor regional powerbases, if not to annex territory". For example, in a cable sent on 6 July 1945 by the Central Committee of the Communist Party of the Soviet Union, the Secretary of the Communist Party of Soviet Azerbaijan was instructed to "Organize a Separatist Movement in Southern Azerbaijan and Other Provinces in Northern Iran."

The Republic of Azerbaijan is also accused of encouraging ethnic divisions in the Iranian region of Azerbaijan.

== See also ==
- Demographics of Iran
- Human rights in Iran
- Languages and ethnicities in Iran
- Religious minorities in Iran

Identities:

- Armenian-Iranians
- Azarbaijan (Iran)
- Georgians in Iran
- Iranian Georgians
- Iranian Circassians
- Russians in Iran
- Assyrians in Iran
- Iranian Arabs
- Iranian Kurds
- Iranian Azerbaijanis
- Iranian Kurdistan
- Iranian Kuwaitis
- Koreans in Iran
