= Larak, Chaharmahal and Bakhtiari =

Village in Chaharmahal and Bakhtiari province, Iran

Larak Persian: لارك
- Village
- Location within Iran
- Coordinates: 32°34′31″N 50°41′30″E
- Country: Iran
- Province: Chaharmahal and Bakhtiari
- County: Ben
- District: Central
- Rural District: Howmeh

Population (2016)
  - Total: 511
- Time zone: UTC+3:30 (IRST)

Larak (Persian: لارك) (Note: Also romanized as Lārak; also known as Lāţān and Latūn) is a village in Howmeh Rural District of the Central District in Ben County, Chaharmahal and Bakhtiari province, Iran.

== Demographics ==
=== Ethnicity ===
The village is populated by Turkic people.

=== Population ===
At the time of the 2006 National Census, the village's population was 583 in 157 households, when it was in Vardanjan Rural District (Note: Formerly Ben Rural District) of the former Ben District in Shahrekord County. The following census in 2011 counted 600 people in 184 households. The 2016 census measured the population of the village as 511 people in 177 households, by which time the district had been separated from the county in the establishment of Ben County. The rural district was transferred to the new Central District, and Larak was transferred to Howmeh Rural District created in the district. It was the most populous village in its rural district.
