= Sheykh Shaban =

Village in Chaharmahal and Bakhtiari province, Iran

Sheykh Shaban Persian: شيخ شبان
- Village
- Location within Iran
- Coordinates: 32°35′21″N 50°36′21″E
- Country: Iran
- Province: Chaharmahal and Bakhtiari
- County: Ben
- District: Central
- Rural District: Howmeh

Population (2016)
  - Total: 2,683
- Time zone: UTC+3:30 (IRST)

Sheykh Shaban (Persian: شيخ شبان) (Note: Also romanized as Sheykh Shabān) is a village in, and the capital of, Howmeh Rural District in the Central District of Ben County, Chaharmahal and Bakhtiari province, Iran.

== Demographics ==
=== Ethnicity ===
The village is populated by Persians.

=== Population ===
At the time of the 2006 National Census, the village's population was 2,689 in 666 households, when it was in Vardanjan Rural District (Note: Formerly Ben Rural District) of the former Ben District in Shahrekord County. The following census in 2011 counted 2,586 people in 732 households. The 2016 census measured the population of the village as 2,683 people in 842 households, by which time the district had been separated from the county in the establishment of Ben County. The rural district was transferred to the new Central District, and Sheykh Shaban was transferred to Howmeh Rural District created in the district. It was the most populous village in its rural district.
