= Pahna =

Village in Chaharmahal and Bakhtiari province, Iran

Pahna Persian: پهنا
- Village
- Location within Iran
- Coordinates: 32°41′45″N 50°32′03″E
- Country: Iran
- Province: Chaharmahal and Bakhtiari
- County: Ben
- District: Sheyda
- Rural District: Zayandeh Rud-e Jonubi

Population (2016)
  - Total: 303
- Time zone: UTC+3:30 (IRST)

Pahna (Persian: پهنا) (Note: Also romanized as Pahnā) is a village in Zayandeh Rud-e Jonubi Rural District of Sheyda District in Ben County, Chaharmahal and Bakhtiari province, Iran.

== Demographics ==
=== Ethnicity ===
The village is populated by Turkic people.

=== Population ===
At the time of the 2006 National Census, the village's population was 324 in 80 households, when it was in the former Ben District of Shahrekord County. The following census in 2011 counted 312 people in 89 households. The 2016 census measured the population of the village as 303 people in 84 households, by which time the district had been separated from the county with the establishment of Ben County. The rural district was transferred to the new Sheyda District.
