= Sangchin =

Sangchin or Sang Chin (Persian: سنگچين or سنگ چين) may refer to:

- Sangchin, Chaharmahal and Bakhtiari
- Sangchin, Kermanshah
- Sang Chin, Mazandaran
- Sangchin, North Khorasan
