= Jamalvi-ye Jadid =

Village in Chaharmahal and Bakhtiari province, Iran

Jamalvi-ye Jadid Persian: جمالوی جدید
- Village
- Location within Iran
- Coordinates: 32°39′45″N 50°32′06″E
- Country: Iran
- Province: Chaharmahal and Bakhtiari
- County: Ben
- District: Sheyda
- Rural District: Zayandeh Rud-e Jonubi

Population (2016)
  - Total: 69
- Time zone: UTC+3:30 (IRST)

Jamalvi-ye Jadid (Persian: جمالوی جدید) (Note: Also romanized as Jamālvī-ye Jadīd) is a village in Zayandeh Rud-e Jonubi Rural District of Sheyda District in Ben County, Chaharmahal and Bakhtiari province, Iran.

== Demographics ==
=== Ethnicity ===
The village is populated by Turkic people.

=== Population ===
At the time of the 2006 National Census, the village's population was 57 in 13 households, when it was in the former Ben District of Shahrekord County. The following census in 2011 counted 44 people in 12 households. The 2016 census measured the population of the village as 69 people in 17 households, by which time the district had been separated from the county in the establishment of Ben County. The rural district was transferred to the new Sheyda District.
