= Tumanak =

Village in Chaharmahal and Bakhtiari province, Iran

Tumanak Persian: تومانك
- Village
- Location within Iran
- Coordinates: 32°30′11″N 50°40′21″E
- Country: Iran
- Province: Chaharmahal and Bakhtiari
- County: Ben
- District: Central
- Rural District: Vardanjan

Population (2016)
  - Total: 642
- Time zone: UTC+3:30 (IRST)

Tumanak (Persian: تومانك) (Note: Also romanized as Tūmānak) is a village in Vardanjan Rural District (Note: Formerly Ben Rural District) of the Central District in Ben County, Chaharmahal and Bakhtiari province, Iran.

== Demographics ==
=== Ethnicity ===
The village is populated by Persians and Turkic people.

=== Population ===
At the time of the 2006 National Census, the village's population was 693 in 158 households, when it was in the former Ben District of Shahrekord County. The following census in 2011 counted 709 people in 200 households. The 2016 census measured the population of the village as 642 people in 201 households, by which time the district had been separated from the county in the establishment of Ben County. The rural district was transferred to the new Central District.
