= Heydari, Chaharmahal and Bakhtiari =

Village in Chaharmahal and Bakhtiari province, Iran

Heydari Persian: حیدری
- Village
- Location within Iran
- Coordinates: 32°39′49″N 50°34′46″E
- Country: Iran
- Province: Chaharmahal and Bakhtiari
- County: Ben
- District: Sheyda
- Rural District: Sheyda

Population (2016)
  - Total: 1,339
- Time zone: UTC+3:30 (IRST)

Heydari (Persian: حیدری) (Note: Also romanized as Ḩeydarī) is a village in, and the capital of, Sheyda Rural District in Sheyda District of Ben County, Chaharmahal and Bakhtiari province, Iran. It served as the capital of Zayandeh Rud-e Jonubi Rural District until its capital was transferred to the village of Azadegan.

== Demographics ==
=== Ethnicity ===
The village is populated by Turkic people.

=== Population ===
At the time of the 2006 National Census, the village's population was 1,650 in 418 households, when it was in Zayandeh Rud-e Jonubi Rural District of the former Ben District in Shahrekord County. The following census in 2011 counted 1,538 people in 452 households. The 2016 census measured the population of the village as 1,339 people in 430 households, by which time the district had been separated from the county in the establishment of Ben County. The rural district was transferred to the new Sheyda District, and Heydari was transferred to Sheyda Rural District created in the district.
