= Bardeh, Chaharmahal and Bakhtiari =

Village in Chaharmahal and Bakhtiari province, Iran

Bardeh Persian: بارده
- Village
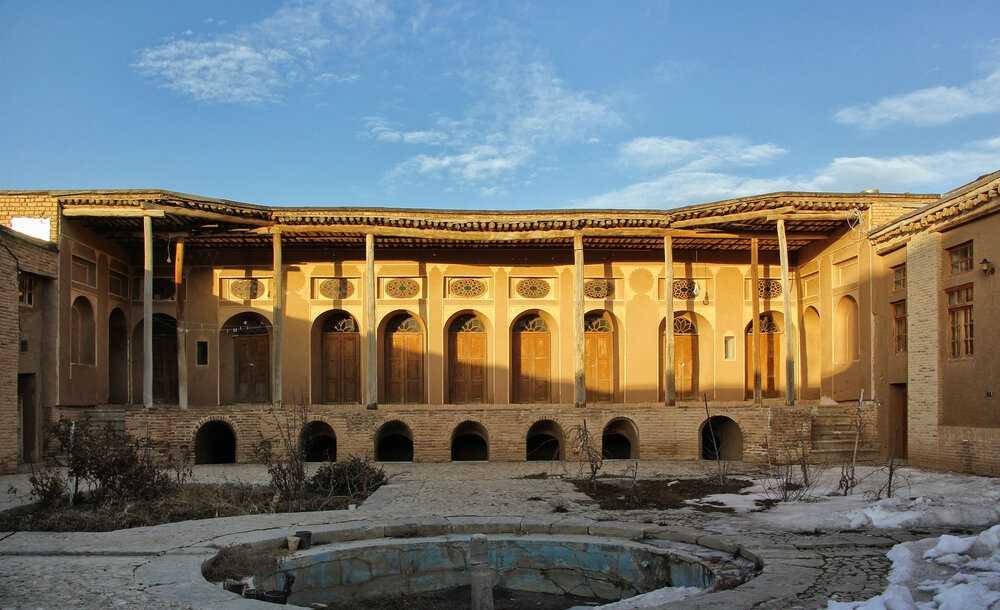
- Darab Khan and Mohammad Hasan Khan Bardeh Castle is a historical castle located in the village of Bardeh, Ben County.

- Location within Iran
- Coordinates: 32°34′10″N 50°31′32″E
- Country: Iran
- Province: Chaharmahal and Bakhtiari
- County: Ben
- District: Central
- Rural District: Vardanjan

Population (2016)
  - Total: 2,356
- Time zone: UTC+3:30 (IRST)

Bardeh (Persian: بارده) (Note: Also romanized as Bārdeh) is a village in, and the capital of, Vardanjan Rural District (Note: Formerly Ben Rural District) in the Central District of Ben County, Chaharmahal and Bakhtiari province, Iran. The previous capital of the rural district was the village of Vardanjan, now a city.

== Demographics ==
=== Ethnicity ===
The village is populated by Turkic people with a Luri minority.

=== Population ===
At the time of the 2006 National Census, the village's population was 2,781 in 662 households, when it was in the former Ben District of Shahrekord County. The following census in 2011 counted 2,534 people in 688 households. The 2016 census measured the population of the village as 2,356 people in 728 households, by which time the district had been separated from the county in the establishment of Ben County. The rural district was transferred to the new Central District.

== Climate ==
Climate data for Bardeh (elevation: 2394m, 2000-2012 precipitation normals)
Month	Jan	Feb	Mar	Apr	May	Jun	Jul	Aug	Sep	Oct	Nov	Dec	Year
Average precipitation mm (inches)	49.8 (1.96)	42.3 (1.67)	46.7 (1.84)	54.8 (2.16)	6.4 (0.25)	0.8 (0.03)	0.1 (0.00)	0.0 (0.0)	0.5 (0.02)	6.2 (0.24)	49.9 (1.96)	59.8 (2.35)	317.3 (12.48)
Source: Chaharmahalmet
