= Azadegan, Chaharmahal and Bakhtiari =

Village in Chaharmahal and Bakhtiari province, Iran

Azadegan Persian: ازادگان
- Village
- Location within Iran
- Coordinates: 32°40′52″N 50°28′53″E
- Country: Iran
- Province: Chaharmahal and Bakhtiari
- County: Ben
- District: Sheyda
- Rural District: Zayandeh Rud-e Jonubi

Population (2016)
  - Total: 789
- Time zone: UTC+3:30 (IRST)

Azadegan (Persian: ازادگان) (Note: Also romanized as Āzādegān) is a village in, and the capital of, Zayandeh Rud-e Jonubi Rural District in Sheyda District of Ben County, Chaharmahal and Bakhtiari province, Iran. The previous capital of the rural district was the village of Heydari.

== Demographics ==
=== Ethnicity ===
The village is populated by Turkic people.

=== Population ===
At the time of the 2006 National Census, the village's population was 743 in 172 households, when it was in the former Ben District of Shahrekord County. The following census in 2011 counted 709 people in 207 households. The 2016 census measured the population of the village as 789 people in 240 households, by which time the district had been separated from the county in the establishment of Ben County. The rural district was transferred to the new Sheyda District. Azadegan was the most populous village in its rural district.
