= Shahrak-e Galu Gerd =

Village in Chaharmahal and Bakhtiari province, Iran

Shahrak-e Galu Gerd Persian: شهرك گلوگرد
- Village
- Location within Iran
- Coordinates: 31°54′59″N 50°51′25″E
- Country: Iran
- Province: Chaharmahal and Bakhtiari
- County: Borujen
- District: Boldaji
- Rural District: Emamzadeh Hamzeh Ali

Population (2016)
  - Total: 806
- Time zone: UTC+3:30 (IRST)

Shahrak-e Galu Gerd (Persian: شهرك گلوگرد) (Note: Also romanized as Shahrak-e Galū Gerd; also known as Galū Gerd) is a village in Emamzadeh Hamzeh Ali Rural District of Boldaji District in Borujen County, Chaharmahal and Bakhtiari province, Iran.

== Demographics ==
=== Ethnicity ===
The village is populated by Lurs.

=== Population ===
At the time of the 2006 National Census, the village's population was 1,098 in 222 households, when it was in Chaghakhor Rural District. The following census in 2011 counted 957 people in 266 households, by which time it had been transferred to Emamzadeh Hamzeh Ali Rural District. The 2016 census measured the population of the village as 806 people in 225 households.
