= Yan Cheshmeh =

City in Chaharmahal and Bakhtiari province, Iran

Yan Cheshmeh Persian: يان چشمه
- City
- Location within Iran
- Coordinates: 32°40′09″N 50°43′36″E
- Country: Iran
- Province: Chaharmahal and Bakhtiari
- County: Ben
- District: Sheyda
- Established as a city: 2018

Population (2016)
  - Total: 2,190
- Time zone: UTC+3:30 (IRST)

Yan Cheshmeh (Persian: يان چشمه) (Note: Also romanized as Yān Chashmeh and Yān Cheshmeh; also known as Halīleh and Yātcheshmeh) is a city in, and the capital of, Sheyda District in Ben County, Chaharmahal and Bakhtiari province, Iran.

== Demographics ==
=== Ethnicity ===
The city is populated by Turkic people.

=== Population ===
At the time of the 2006 National Census, Yan Cheshmeh's population was 2,244 in 564 households, when it was a village in Zayandeh Rud-e Jonubi Rural District of the former Ben District in Shahrekord County. The following census in 2011 counted 2,230 people in 671 households. The 2016 census measured the population of the village as 2,190 people in 695 households, by which time the district had been separated from the county in the establishment of Ben County. The rural district was transferred to the new Sheyda District, and the village was transferred to Sheyda Rural District created in the district.

Yan Cheshmeh was converted to a city in 2018.

== Climate ==
Climate data for Yan Cheshmeh (elevation: 2238m, 1956-2012 precipitation normals)
Month	Jan	Feb	Mar	Apr	May	Jun	Jul	Aug	Sep	Oct	Nov	Dec	Year
Average precipitation mm (inches)	56.7 (2.23)	57.2 (2.25)	65.9 (2.59)	43.0 (1.69)	20.4 (0.80)	1.6 (0.06)	1.5 (0.06)	0.4 (0.02)	0.4 (0.02)	8.3 (0.33)	38.8 (1.53)	59.1 (2.33)	353.3 (13.91)
Source: Chaharmahalmet
