= Vardanjan =

Vardanjan may refer to:

== Places ==
- Vardanjan Rural District, in Shahrekord County, Chaharmahal and Bakhtiari Province, Iran
  - Vardanjan, Iran, a village in Shahrekord County, Chaharmahal and Bakhtiari Province, Iran
  - Vardanjan, Farsan, a village in Farsan County, Chaharmahal and Bakhtiari Province, Iran

== People ==
- Gurgen Vardanjan (born 1963), figure skater and figure skating coach
- Tigran Vardanjan (born 1989), figure skater

== See also ==
- Vardanyan
