= Matui =

Matui (Persian: مطويي or متويي) may refer to:

- Matui, Chaharmahal and Bakhtiari (متويي)
- Matui, Khuzestan (مطويي)
