= Kalbi Bak =

Village in Chaharmahal and Bakhtiari province, Iran

Kalbi Bak Persian: كلبي بك
- Village
- Location within Iran
- Coordinates: 31°55′59″N 50°58′26″E
- Country: Iran
- Province: Chaharmahal and Bakhtiari
- County: Borujen
- District: Boldaji
- Rural District: Emamzadeh Hamzeh Ali

Population (2016)
  - Total: 838
- Time zone: UTC+3:30 (IRST)

Kalbi Bak (Persian: كلبي بك) (Note: Also romanized as Kal Bībak and Kalbī Bak; also known as Kalbībag and Kalbībeyg) is a village in Emamzadeh Hamzeh Ali Rural District of Boldaji District in Borujen County, Chaharmahal and Bakhtiari province, Iran.

== Demographics ==
=== Ethnicity ===
The village is populated by Lurs.

=== Population ===
At the time of the 2006 National Census, the village's population was 874 in 198 households, when it was in Chaghakhor Rural District. The following census in 2011 counted 889 people in 249 households, by which time the village had been transferred to Emamzadeh Hamzeh Ali Rural District. The 2016 census measured the population of the village as 838 people in 252 households. It was the most populous village in its rural district.
