= Sibak =

Sibak (Persian: سيبك) may refer to:

- Sibak, Chaharmahal and Bakhtiari
- Sibak, Isfahan
- Sibak, see Glossary of Wing Chun terms#Family Lineage Titles or Terms
