= Sheyda Rural District =

Rural district in Chaharmahal and Bakhtiari province, Iran

Sheyda Rural District Persian: دهستان شيدا
- Rural District
- Location within Iran
- Coordinates: 32°39′N 50°40′E
- Country: Iran
- Province: Chaharmahal and Bakhtiari
- County: Ben
- District: Sheyda
- Established: 2013
- Capital: Heydari

Population (2016)
  - Total: 3,541
- Time zone: UTC+3:30 (IRST)

Sheyda Rural District (Persian: دهستان شيدا) is in Sheyda District of Ben County, Chaharmahal and Bakhtiari province, Iran. Its capital is the village of Heydari.

== History ==
In 2013, Ben District was separated from Shahrekord County in the establishment of Ben County, and Sheyda Rural District was created in the new Sheyda District.

== Demographics ==
=== Population ===
At the time of the 2016 National Census, the rural district's population was 3,541 in 1,130 households. The most populous of its three villages was Yan Cheshmeh (now a city), with 2,190 people.
