= Khederabad, Chaharmahal and Bakhtiari =

Khederabad خدراباد
- Village
- Location within Iran
- Coordinates: 31°54′27″N 50°52′18″E
- Country: Iran
- Province: Chaharmahal and Bakhtiari
- County: Borujen
- Bakhsh: Boldaji
- Rural District: Chaghakhor

Population (2006)
  - Total: 126
- Time zone: UTC+3:30 (IRST)
  - Summer (DST): UTC+4:30 (IRDT)

Khederabad (Persian: خدراباد, also Romanized as Khederābād; also known as Khadr Ab) is a village in Chaghakhor Rural District, Boldaji District, Borujen County, Chaharmahal and Bakhtiari Province, Iran. At the 2006 census, its population was 126, in 25 families. The village is populated by Lurs.
