= Howmeh Rural District (Ben County) =

Rural district in Chaharmahal and Bakhtiari province, Iran

Howmeh Rural District Persian: دهستان حومه
- Rural district
- Location within Iran
- Coordinates: 32°34′N 50°40′E
- Country: Iran
- Province: Chaharmahal and Bakhtiari
- County: Ben
- District: Central
- Established: 2013
- Capital: Sheykh Shaban

Population (2016)
  - Total: 3,194
- Time zone: UTC+3:30 (IRST)

Howmeh Rural District (Persian: دهستان حومه) is in the Central District of Ben County, Chaharmahal and Bakhtiari province, Iran. Its capital is the village of Sheykh Shaban.

== History ==
In 2013, Ben District was separated from Shahrekord County in the establishment of Ben County, and Howmeh Rural District was created in the new Central District.

== Demographics ==
=== Population ===
At the time of the 2016 National Census, the rural district's population was 3,194 in 1,019 households. The most populous of its two villages was Sheykh Shaban, with 2,683 people.

=== Other villages in the rural district ===
- Larak
