= Khaniabad, Chaharmahal and Bakhtiari =

Khaniabad خاني اباد
- Village
- Location within Iran
- Coordinates: 31°54′00″N 50°53′52″E
- Country: Iran
- Province: Chaharmahal and Bakhtiari
- County: Borujen
- Bakhsh: Boldaji
- Rural District: Chaghakhor

Population (2006)
  - Total: 187
- Time zone: UTC+3:30 (IRST)
  - Summer (DST): UTC+4:30 (IRDT)

Khaniabad (Persian: خاني اباد, also Romanized as Khānīābād; also known as Khani Abad Gandoman) is a village in Chaghakhor Rural District, Boldaji District, Borujen County, Chaharmahal and Bakhtiari Province, Iran. At the 2006 census, its population was 187, in 40 families. The village is populated by Lurs.
