= Partition of Iran =

The scenario of Iran splitting along ethnic lines

The partition of Iran refers to the scenario of splitting Iran into separate entities along ethnic lines. The idea has been discussed during the First World War, Iran–Iraq War and the 2026 Iran war. Many observers imagine the Balkanization of Iran due to its large diverse population of Azerbaijanis, Kurds, Lurs, Arabs, Baloch, and Turkmens.

== Background ==
Persians are the majority in Iran, but other ethnicities such as Azeris, Kurds, Lurs, Arabs, Baloch, and Turkmen populate the country's outer regions. Due to this many observers, imagine the territorial breakup of Iran along ethnic lines.

== History ==
=== World War 1 ===
On 17 June 1914, during a debate in the British House of Commons concerning the British government's involvement in the Anglo-Persian Oil Company, multiple people argued that British and Russian activities were leading towards the partition of Persia.

=== Iran-Iraq War ===
A 1980 CIA assessment titled “Iran: Fragmentation in the future?” examined the possibility that the Iran–Iraq War could lead to the fragmentation of Iran. It noted that Iraq was considering establishing an Arab entity in Khuzestan. The report discussed the political positions of Iran's Kurdish, Azerbaijani, Turkoman, Baluchi, Arab and Qashqai communities. It identified three possible forms of fragmentation: de facto federalization, in which local leaders assumed control of one or more regions without declaring independence, forcing Tehran to accept the situation; de jure federalization, in which local leaders formally established regional autonomy and compelled Tehran to recognize it; and disintegration, in which regional leaders declared independence, with or without foreign backing, or foreign forces entered border areas to prevent local Iranian leaders from consolidating control.

=== 2026 Iran War ===
During the 2026 Iran War, voices in the U.S. and Israeli media suggested the idea of splitting Iran up into ethnic entities, by exploiting existing ethnic tensions in Iran to weaken the Islamic Republic. Some observers warned the scenario carries deep risks, such as new conflicts.
