= Khaniabad =

Khaniabad (Persian: خاني اباد) may refer to:

- Khaniabad, Chaharmahal and Bakhtiari
- Khaniabad, Tehran
