= Matui, Chaharmahal and Bakhtiari =

Matui متويي
- Village
- Location within Iran
- Coordinates: 31°53′27″N 50°54′52″E
- Country: Iran
- Province: Chaharmahal and Bakhtiari
- County: Borujen
- Bakhsh: Boldaji
- Rural District: Chaghakhor

Population (2006)
  - Total: 132
- Time zone: UTC+3:30 (IRST)
  - Summer (DST): UTC+4:30 (IRDT)

Matui (Persian: متويي, also Romanized as Matū’ī) is a village in Chaghakhor Rural District, Boldaji District, Borujen County, Chaharmahal and Bakhtiari Province, Iran. At the 2006 census, its population was 132, in 25 families. The village is populated by Lurs.
