= Khederabad =

Khederabad or Khedrabad (Persian: خدراباد) may refer to:

- Khederabad, Chaharmahal and Bakhtiari
- Khederabad, Kermanshah
- Khederabad, Qom
