= Sangchin, Chaharmahal and Bakhtiari =

Sangchin سنگچين
- Village
- Location within Iran
- Coordinates: 31°55′05″N 50°56′28″E
- Country: Iran
- Province: Chaharmahal and Bakhtiari
- County: Borujen
- Bakhsh: Boldaji
- Rural District: Chaghakhor

Population (2006)
  - Total: 40
- Time zone: UTC+3:30 (IRST)
  - Summer (DST): UTC+4:30 (IRDT)

Sangchin (Persian: سنگچين, also Romanized as Sangchīn) is a village in Chaghakhor Rural District, Boldaji District, Borujen County, Chaharmahal and Bakhtiari Province, Iran. At the 2006 census, its population was 40, in 15 families. The village is populated by Lurs.
