= Avargan, Chaharmahal and Bakhtiari =

Village in Chaharmahal and Bakhtiari province, Iran

Avargan Persian: اورگان
- Village
- Location within Iran
- Coordinates: 31°54′32″N 50°57′24″E
- Country: Iran
- Province: Chaharmahal and Bakhtiari
- County: Borujen
- District: Boldaji
- Rural District: Chaghakhor

Population (2016)
  - Total: 2,041
- Time zone: UTC+3:30 (IRST)

Avargan (Persian: اورگان) (Note: Also romanized as Āvargān and Owregān; also known as Auragūn, Āvardgān, Āverd Kān, and Organ) is a village in, and the capital of, Chaghakhor Rural District in Boldaji District of Borujen County, Chaharmahal and Bakhtiari province, Iran.

== Demographics ==
=== Ethnicity ===
The village is populated by Lurs.

=== Population ===
At the time of the 2006 National Census, the village's population was 2,553 in 535 households. The following census in 2011 counted 2,477 people in 640 households. The 2016 census measured the population of the village as 2,041 people in 636 households. It was the most populous village in its rural district.

== Climate ==
Climate data for Avargan (elevation: 2,410 m (7,910 ft), 1972-2013)
Month	Jan	Feb	Mar	Apr	May	Jun	Jul	Aug	Sep	Oct	Nov	Dec	Year
Record high °C (°F)	18 (64)	22 (72)	21 (70)	28 (82)	30 (86)	33 (91)	37 (99)	35 (95)	32 (90)	27 (81)	25 (77)	21 (70)	37.0 (98.6)
Mean daily maximum °C (°F)	4 (39)	6 (43)	10 (50)	15 (59)	21 (70)	27 (81)	30 (86)	29 (84)	26 (79)	20 (68)	12 (54)	7 (45)	17.2 (63.0)
Daily mean °C (°F)	−2 (28)	0 (32)	4 (39)	9 (48)	14 (57)	19 (66)	21 (70)	20 (68)	17 (63)	12 (54)	6 (43)	2 (36)	10.2 (50.4)
Mean daily minimum °C (°F)	−7 (19)	−5 (23)	−1 (30)	3 (37)	7 (45)	10 (50)	13 (55)	12 (54)	8 (46)	4 (39)	0 (32)	−4 (25)	3.2 (37.8)
Record low °C (°F)	−30 (−22)	−31 (−24)	−19 (−2)	−17 (1)	−6 (21)	1 (34)	5 (41)	4 (39)	−3 (27)	−9 (16)	−12 (10)	−30 (−22)	−31.0 (−23.8)
Average precipitation mm (inches)	80 (3.1)	74 (2.9)	87 (3.4)	70 (2.8)	25 (1.0)	1 (0.0)	6 (0.2)	1 (0.0)	0 (0)	13 (0.5)	64 (2.5)	88 (3.5)	508.7 (20.03)
Average relative humidity (%)	68	65	57	50	44	37	35	35	37	45	56	64	49.4
Mean monthly sunshine hours	190	195	229	229	293	327	316	297	291	268	198	187	3,020
Source: Iran Meteorological Organization
