= Dastgerd, Borujen =

Village in Chaharmahal and Bakhtiari province, Iran

Dastgerd Persian: دستگرد
- Village
- Location within Iran
- Coordinates: 31°54′09″N 50°55′11″E
- Country: Iran
- Province: Chaharmahal and Bakhtiari
- County: Borujen
- District: Boldaji
- Rural District: Chaghakhor

Population (2016)
  - Total: 558
- Time zone: UTC+3:30 (IRST)

Dastgerd (Persian: دستگرد) is a village in Chaghakhor Rural District of Boldaji District in Borujen County, Chaharmahal and Bakhtiari province, Iran.

== Demographics ==
=== Ethnicity ===
The village is populated by Lurs.

=== Population ===
At the time of the 2006 National Census, the village's population was 578 in 139 households. The following census in 2011 counted 642 people in 171 households. The 2016 census measured the population of the village as 558 people in 181 households.
