= Aqbolagh, Borujen =

Village in Chaharmahal and Bakhtiari province, Iran

Aqbolagh Persian: اقبلاغ
- Village
- Location within Iran
- Coordinates: 31°54′11″N 51°07′03″E
- Country: Iran
- Province: Chaharmahal and Bakhtiari
- County: Borujen
- District: Boldaji
- Rural District: Emamzadeh Hamzeh Ali

Population (2016)
  - Total: 696
- Time zone: UTC+3:30 (IRST)

Aqbolagh (Persian: اقبلاغ) (Note: Also romanized as Āqbolāgh; also known as Āq Balāq) is a village in, and the capital of, Emamzadeh Hamzeh Ali Rural District in Boldaji District of Borujen County, Chaharmahal and Bakhtiari province, Iran.

== Demographics ==
=== Ethnicity ===
The village is populated by Turkic people.

=== Population ===
At the time of the 2006 National Census, the village's population was 684 in 169 households. The following census in 2011 counted 703 people in 197 households. The 2016 census measured the population of the village as 696 people in 211 households.
