= Iranian Kazakhs =

Total population
- 5,000 in the city of Gorgan, approx. 10,000 spread through the rest of the Iran

Regions with significant populations

Languages
- Persian, Kazakh

Religion
- Islam (Sunni)

Related ethnic groups
- Azerbaijanis, Hazaras, Turkmens, Uzbeks

Iranian Kazakhs live mainly in the Golestan Province in Northern Iran. In 1982, there were 3,000 Kazakhs living in Iran in the city of Gorgan. The number of Iranian Kazakhs might have been slightly higher, because many of them returned to Kazakhstan after the dissolution of the Soviet Union, from where they had immigrated to Iran after the Bolshevik October Revolution (1917).

Currently, the city of Gorgan contains 5,000 ethnic Kazakhs, who speak Kazakh and Persian on varying levels.

== Origins ==
The first Kazakhs arrived from the territory of Turkmenistan into the northeastern city of Gorgan in 1929. Since then, Kazakh immigration has experienced three distinct waves. The first occurred with the creation of the Kazakh Soviet Socialist Republic. The second wave occurred with the fall of the Soviet Union, which saw the population of Kazakh Iranians swell significantly. Unlike the previous wave of immigration, these individuals were acculturated with the Russian language, rather than Kazakh. The final wave has been ongoing since 2007 and consists of economic migrants arriving from the western provinces of Atyrau and Mangystau to the cities of Gorgan, Bandar Torkaman and Gonbad-e Qabus. Although mostly Sunni, many Kazakhs in Iran converted to Shia Islam after settling among Persian and Turkmen adherents of Shia Islam in Golestan. Shia Kazakhs were indistinguishable from Sunni Kazakhs except by religion.

== See also ==
- Iran–Kazakhstan relations
- Iranian Azerbaijanis
- Iranian Turks
- Kazakhs in Afghanistan
