= Mirza Habib Esfahani =

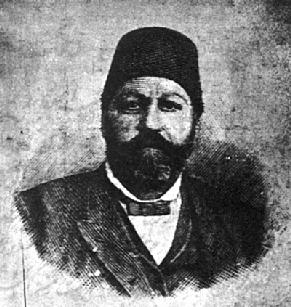
- Picture of Mirza Habib Esfahani
- Born: 1835; Ben, Qajar Iran
- Died: 1893 (aged 57–58); Bursa, Ottoman Empire
- Resting place: Bursa
- Occupations: Poet, grammarian and translator
- Writing career
- Language: Persian; Ottoman Turkish
- Notable works: Dastur-e Sokhan; Khatt va khattatan

Mirza Habib Esfahani (Persian: میرزا حبیب اصفهانی) was an Iranian poet, grammarian and translator, who lived in exile in the Ottoman Empire for much of his life. He is principally known for his Persian translation of the satirical novel The Adventures of Hajji Baba of Ispahan and for composing the first systematic grammar of the Persian language.

== Biography ==
He was born in 1835 in Ben, a small village in the Bakhtiyari area of western Iran. He started his education in Saman, and completed his traditional secular and religious education in Isfahan and Tehran. In 1862, he went to Baghdad to study literature, Arabic, and Islamic studies. In 1866, he returned to Tehran, but soon found himself forced to leave. According to the Danish historian Claus Valling Pedersen, it was because the "contents of some of his writings had led secular and religious authorities, respectively, to accuse him of anti-state and anti-religious activities." However, the Turkish historian Tahsin Yazıcı states it was "apparently on account of a poem in which he satirized Mirza Mohammad Khan Sepahsalar and which earned him accusations of heresy." Mirza Habib fled to Constantinople in the Ottoman Empire, where he at first sought safety in a French monastery. He quickly established connections with influential political and literary personalities such as the grand vizier Mehmed Emin Âli Pasha and Ahmed Vefik Pasha, who translated the writings of the French playwright Molière into Ottoman Turkish.

Mirza Habib was able to work as a Persian and Arabic lecturer at the Maktab-i Sultani school in the Constantinople neighborhood of Galata due to their assistance. Later, he was given the position of superintendent in the Ottoman ministry of education. The Société Asiatique elected him as an honorary member in recognition of his literary accomplishments. Mirza Habib was also close friends with three other Iranian intellectuals in Constantinople, Mirza Aqa Khan Kermani, Sheikh Ahmad Rouhi and Mirza Hasan Khabir al-Molk. Those three figures were eventually apprehended by Ottoman officials, who transported them to Iran, where they were immediately put to death, an act that many historians regard as a turning point in the development of the Constitutional Revolution of Iran (1905–1911). In addition to working together, Mirza Habib, Mirza Aqa Khan, and Ahmad Rouhi also read and copyedited each other's writings. Ahmad Rouhi's handwriting appeared on the first copy of Mirza Habib's translation of The Adventures of Hajji Baba of Ispahan that made it to Iran and India; as a result, people believed it to be his work and his name was mistakenly attached to the book's earliest publications.

Mirza Habib sought medical care in Bursa near the end of his life, where he died in 1893 and was buried.

== Works ==
Mirza Habib was a creative and flexible translator who wrote in both Persian and Turkish. In particular, he is praised for his Dastur-e Sokhan ("The grammar of speech"), the first systematic grammar of the Persian language. It was first released in Istanbul in 1872, and many later works have used it as inspiration.

Mirza Habib's most significant book in Turkish is the Khatt va khattatan that he composed in 1888, which is a biographical compendium of Persian and Turkish calligraphers.

== Sources ==
- Dabashi, Hamid (2015). Persophilia: Persian Culture on the Global Scene. Harvard University Press. ISBN 978-0674504691.
- Dabashi, Hamid (2020). Reversing the Colonial Gaze: Persian Travelers Abroad. Cambridge University Press. ISBN 978-1108488129.
- Pedersen, Claus Valling (2021). "Mīrzā Ḥabīb Iṣfahānī". In Fleet, Kate; Krämer, Gudrun; Matringe, Denis; Nawas, John; Rowson, Everett (eds.). Encyclopaedia of Islam (3rd ed.). Brill Online. ISSN 1873-9830.
- Yazıcı, Tahsin (2002). "Ḥabib Eṣfahāni". Encyclopaedia Iranica.
