= Emamzadeh Hamzeh Ali Rural District =

Rural district in Chaharmahal and Bakhtiari province, Iran

Emamzadeh Hamzeh Ali Rural District Persian: دهستان امامزاده حمزه علي
- Rural District
- Location within Iran
- Coordinates: 31°56′N 50°58′E
- Country: Iran
- Province: Chaharmahal and Bakhtiari
- County: Borujen
- District: Boldaji
- Established: 2001
- Capital: Aqbolagh

Population (2016)
  - Total: 2,569
- Time zone: UTC+3:30 (IRST)

Emamzadeh Hamzeh Ali Rural District (Persian: دهستان امامزاده حمزه علي) is in Boldaji District of Borujen County, Chaharmahal and Bakhtiari province, Iran. Its capital is the village of Aqbolagh.

== Demographics ==
=== Population ===
At the time of the 2006 National Census, the rural district's population was 684 in 169 households. There were 2,821 inhabitants in 789 households at the following census of 2011. The 2016 census measured the population of the rural district as 2,569 in 759 households. The most populous of its eight villages was Kalbi Bak, with 838 people.

=== Other villages in the rural district ===
- Shahrak-e Galu Gerd
