= Shams ol-Moluk Mosahab =

Iranian educator and politician (1913–1997)

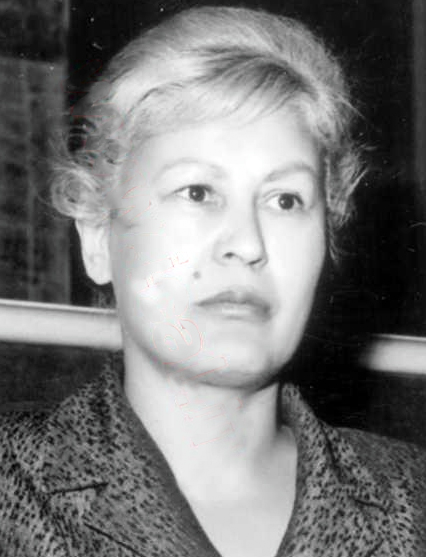

Member of the Senate of Iran
- In office 1963–1980

Personal details
- Born: 1913 Tehran, Qajar Iran
- Died: 1997 (aged 83–84)
- Relatives: Gholamhossein Mosaheb (brother)
- Education: University of Tehran

Shams ol-Moluk Mosahab (Persian: شمس‌الملوک مصاحب, 1913–1997) was an Iranian educator and politician. In 1963 she was one of the first two women appointed to the Senate. She served as Deputy Minister of Education.

== Biography ==
Mosahab was born in Tehran in 1913, the third child of the politician Mohammed Ali Mosahab. Her brother Gholamhossein later became a mathematician.

She attended Namus primary school and then the Higher Teacher Training College. She then became one of the first group of women to be admitted to the University of Tehran, after its inauguration in 1936, becoming the first woman to complete a Ph.D. in Persian Literature in 1945. She subsequently attended Laval University in Canada and the University of Florida and Indiana University in the United States, studying for a second doctorate.

After returning to Iran, she began lecturing at the University of Tehran, later becoming a headteacher at the Parvin, Shahdokht, and Nurbaksh girls high schools, as well as serving as director of the Higher Education and Teacher Training department in the Ministry of Education. She worked for the Ministry of Culture, for the ministry's Office for Rural Culture, and was appointed Deputy Minister of Education, focusing on literacy.

Mosahab was an advocate for women's rights and became member of the Women's Organization of Iran in the 1950s, campaigning women's suffrage and opposing veiling. She supported the Kashf-e hijab (introduced by Reza Shah in 1936) and wrote that many of the problems between men and women where caused by the gender segregation, which had resulted in men and women not actually knowing each other or anything about each others lives:

Our men still talk about their shortcomings, their ordinary life problems and their vocational, artistic, family, and marital issues solely to their male friends and leave their family or wives to have 'feminine' talks with their own friends. The spouse of a lawyer, a minister, an engineer, a university lecturer, a physician, etc., knows little about her husband's life.

She was convinced that the key to solving gender discrimination was for men and women to get to know each other and each others' lives and thus be able to feel understanding and compassion for each other. She campaigned for women's suffrage from within the Women's Organization, giving public lectures and writing on the subject. Women were granted the right to vote in 1963, and following the parliamentary elections that year, Mosahab was one of two women appointed to the Senate. She remained in the Senate until 1980. She oversaw the cultural department of Mohammad Reza Shah’s charitable Pahlavi Foundation.

Mosahab was active as a writer. In 1960, she and co-author Abbas Yamini Sharif wrote a children's book, which saw use in schools. She composed five thousand verses, including "Mother's Gift," "Broken Harp" and "Loving Beloved". She was also active as a translator, notably translating Jane Austen's Pride and Prejudice to Persian.

She died in 1997.
