= Ramin Nourqolipour =

Iranian politician

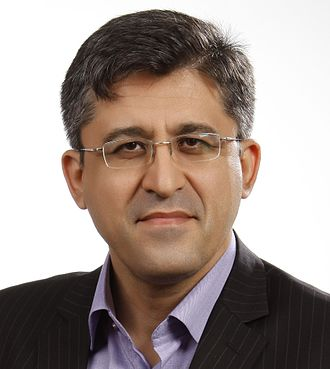

Parliament of Iran
- In office 28 May 2016 – 26 May 2020
- Constituency: Golestan Province(Kordkuy, Bandar Torkaman, Bandargaz, and Gomishan County
- Majority: 69,480 (66.5%)

Personal details
- Born: 16 April 1971 (age 55) Kumushdepe, Golestan Province, Iran
- Party: Iranian Reformists
- Spouse: Saeedeh Javar
- Children: 2 (two sons)
- Education: University of Tehran; Universiti Putra Malaysia
- Committees: Committee on Industries and Mines (2016–May 2020)

Ramin Nourqolipour is an Iranian Türkmen politician. He was a Member of Parliament and a member of reformists' Hope fraction in the Iranian Parliament. He was elected to the parliament to represent a west Golestan Province constituency including four electoral districts: Kordkuy, Turkmen, Bandargaz, and Gomishan. He represented a big part of Türkmen community of Iran in Iranian Parliament for four years between 2016 and 2020.

== Career ==
He received a PhD in GIS and Geomatic Engineering from University Putra Malaysia and a Master's and a bachelor's degree both in Natural Resources Engineering from University of Tehran and Gorgan University of Agricultural Sciences and Natural Resources, respectively.

At the 10th Iranian parliamentary elections in 2016, he was listed in the Pervasive Coalition of Reformists: The Second Step called the List of Hope and then elected to the Parliament with 66.5% of total votes among 14 candidates. In the parliament, he was member of the reformists' Hope fraction in the Iranian Parliament.

== Refusing to nominate for 2020 Iranian legislative election ==
Iranian legislative election was held on 21 February 2020. Due to the unacceptable socioeconomic situation in Iran and the lack of positive impact of parliament in the country's situation, he refused to nominate for 2020 Iranian general election. Through writing a letter at 8 December 2019, he explained the reasons why he decided to refuse nominating himself for the coming legislative election:

I apologize to Iranians for the lack of positive influence of the parliament in improving the economic conditions of the country while in contrast, we have seen the decrease in the economic power and the hardening of living conditions of you in at least during the last four years. I do not have a worthy response to your rightful expectations from the parliament in order to improve your livelihood and living conditions, which is one of the basic demands of anybody from its officials.
