= Sibak, Chaharmahal and Bakhtiari =

Village in Chaharmahal and Bakhtiari province, Iran

Sibak Persian: سيبك
- Village
- Location within Iran
- Coordinates: 31°53′30″N 50°55′52″E
- Country: Iran
- Province: Chaharmahal and Bakhtiari
- County: Borujen
- District: Boldaji
- Rural District: Chaghakhor

Population (2016)
  - Total: 2,024
- Time zone: UTC+3:30 (IRST)

Sibak (Persian: سيبك) (Note: Also romanized as Sībak; also known as Sivak) is a village in Chaghakhor Rural District of Boldaji District in Borujen County, Chaharmahal and Bakhtiari province, Iran.

== Demographics ==
=== Ethnicity ===
The village is populated by Lurs.

=== Population ===
At the time of the 2006 National Census, the village's population was 2,138 in 448 households. The following census in 2011 counted 2,461 people in 602 households. The 2016 census measured the population of the village as 2,024 people in 546 households.
