= Khorasani Turks =

Turkic ethnic group living in Khorasan region of Iran

Total population
- 400,000–854,000

Regions with significant populations
- North Khorasan, Razavi Khorasan, Golestan

Languages
- Khorasani Turkic and Persian

Religion
- Shia Islam

Related ethnic groups
- Turkmens, other Turkic peoples

Khorasani Turks (Persian: ترک‌های خراسان; Khorasani Turkic: خوراسان تؤرکلری) are a Turkic ethnic group inhabiting part of North Khorasan, Razavi Khorasan and Golestan provinces of Iran, as well as in the neighboring regions of Turkmenistan up to beyond the Amu Darya River and speak Khorasani Turkic. Some can also speak Kurdish due to intermarriages with Khorasani Kurds, and they can also speak Persian as it is the lingua franca of Iran.

The Khorasani Turks are not to be confused with other Turkic groups which have arrived in Khorasan more recently, especially Iranian Azerbaijanis, who had a presence in the area, especially in Mashhad, from about the early 20th century.

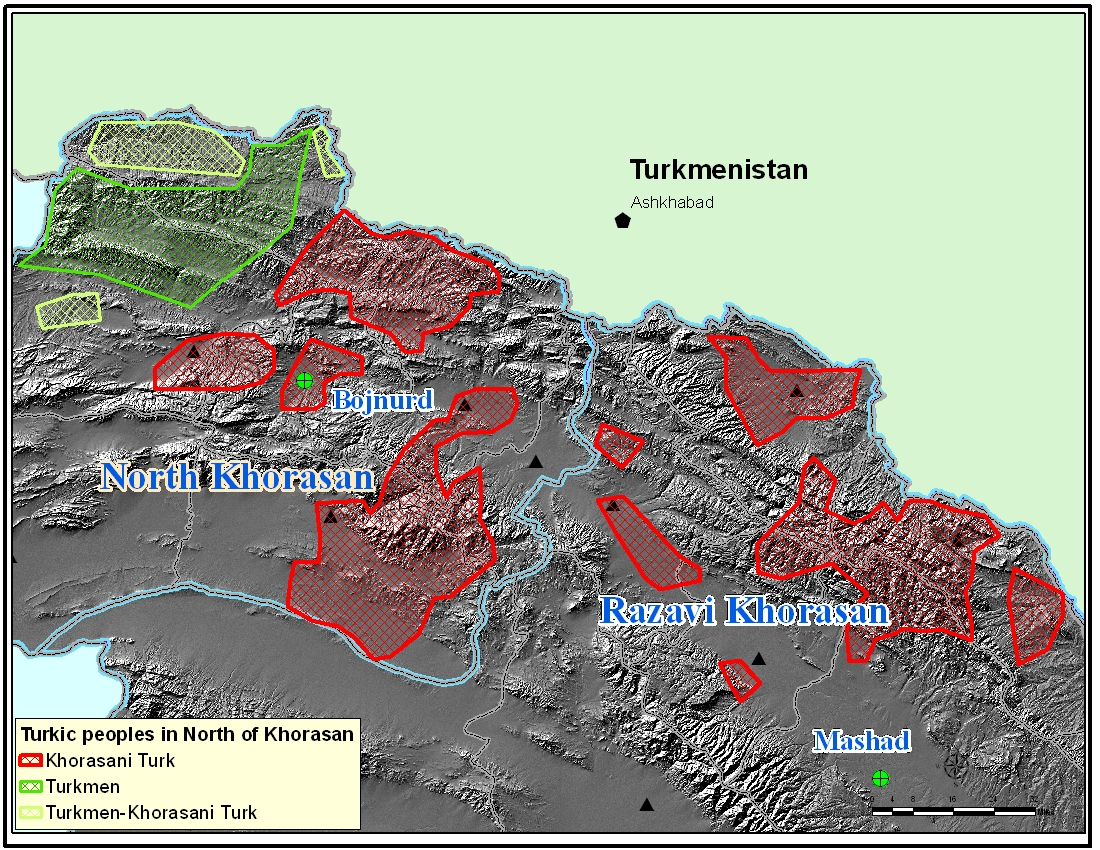
Turks in Khorasan

== Tribes ==
There are many clans and clans in Khorasan due to the arrival of Turks in different dates:

- Za'faranlu live in Shirvan and Quchan.
- Qarachordu lives mainly in Isfarayen.
- Imarli, Bukanli, Cuyanli, Pehlivanli, Boranli and Kilicanli lives mainly in Bojnord. Timurtash and Nardin lives in Gorgan city center.
- Godari lives in Sini.
- Ramiani lives in Ramian, Azadshahr and Gonbad-e Kavous counties of Golestan province.
- Hajilari lives in Minoodasht, Galikesh, Kalaleh, Gonbad-e Kavous counties of Golestan province.
- Qarai lives in Torbat-e Heydarieh.
- Several other tribes include Shamlu, Qaramanlu, and Silsüpür.

== Notable Khorasani Turks ==
- Haj Ghorban Soleimani
- Haji Bektash Veli (disputed)

== See also ==
- Turkic ethnic groups in Iran
- Bayat (tribe)
- Afshar people

== Sources ==
- فصلنامه تحقیقات جغرافیایی، سال سوم شماره ۲، پاییز ۱۳۷۶، دکتر محمد حسین پاپلی یزدی
- The Khorasani Turks of Iran
- Turks of Iran
- kalafat_horasan
