= Gholamhossein Mosahab =

Iranian mathematician; founder of modern encyclopedia writing in Iran

Gholamhossein Mosaheb
- غلام‌حسین مصاحب
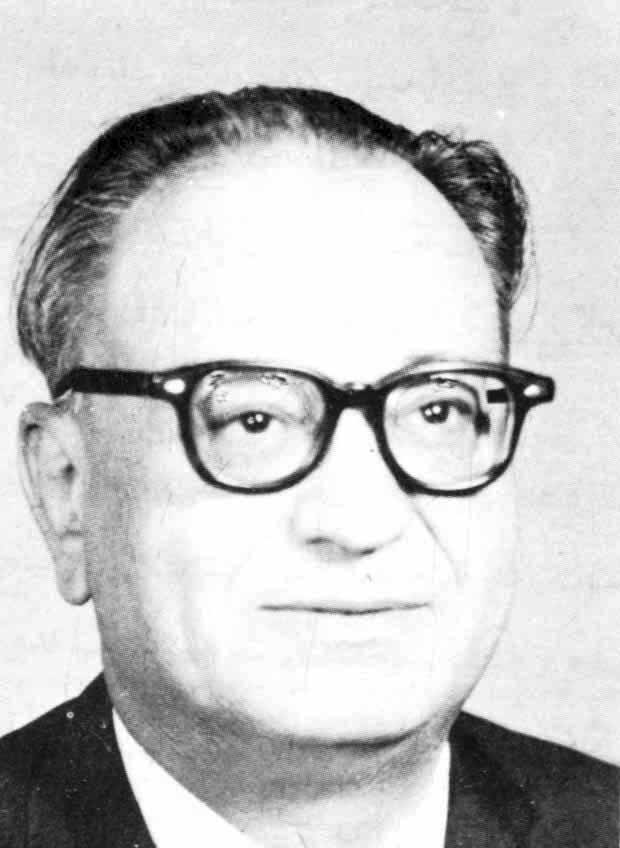
- Born: 13 October 1910
- Died: 1979 (aged 68–69)
- Education: University of Cambridge
- Occupations: Mathematician; logician
- Relatives: Shams ol-Moluk Mosahab (sister)

Gholamhossein Mosahab (Persian: غلام‌حسین مصاحب, 13 October 1910 – 1979) was an Iranian mathematician and logician whose works have been praised by other scholars such as Iraj Afshar and Najaf Daryabandari. Being fluent in Persian, Arabic, French and English, he studied in Iran, France and England; and received his PhD from Cambridge University. He was the founder of Mosahab Institute of Mathematics, Teacher Training University and was the director of the Institute of Mathematics of Kharazmi University from 1972 to 1974.

During the 1950s, when Persian scientific typography was flourishing, Mosahab invented a left slanted right-to-left font style that he named the Iranic font. This term is still commonly used by typographers in Iran, often as a general term for any left slanted font.

In 1955, Mosahab's Madkhale Manteghe Soorat (Introduction to Formal Logic) was the first scholarly writing in mathematical logic to be published in Iran. This work was given a positive review in 1957 by L. A. Zadeh in the Journal of Symbolic Logic. Mosahab's most famous work in non-mathematical society is as the author of The Persian Encyclopedia, written in the Persian language and consisting of 3 volumes. His methods of organizing and categorizing are still in use. The 1996 publication of The Persian Encyclopedia gave credited authorship to himself, Ahmad Aram and Mahmoud Mosahab.

On 28 June 2009, it was announced that the 100th book released from the Society for the Appreciation of Cultural Works and Dignitaries had been allocated to the life, scientific and cultural works of the late Gholamhossien Mosahab. This tribute is written by Pegah Hajjan. In it are many of Mosahab's published works including an article entitled The First Trigonometry Book, as well as appraisals from other scholars.

He is the founder of the Institute of Mathematical Research (IMR) which is still known as one of the most important Iranian mathematical centers. The Institute of Mathematical Research started its work in October 1965 under the direction of Mosahab, as a semi-independent institute affiliated with Tarbiat Moaalem University. His sister Shams ol-Moluk was one of the first two women appointed to the Senate.
