= Iranian Turkmens =

Turkmen diaspora living mainly in northern and northeastern regions of Iran

ایران ترکمنلار Eýranly türkmenler
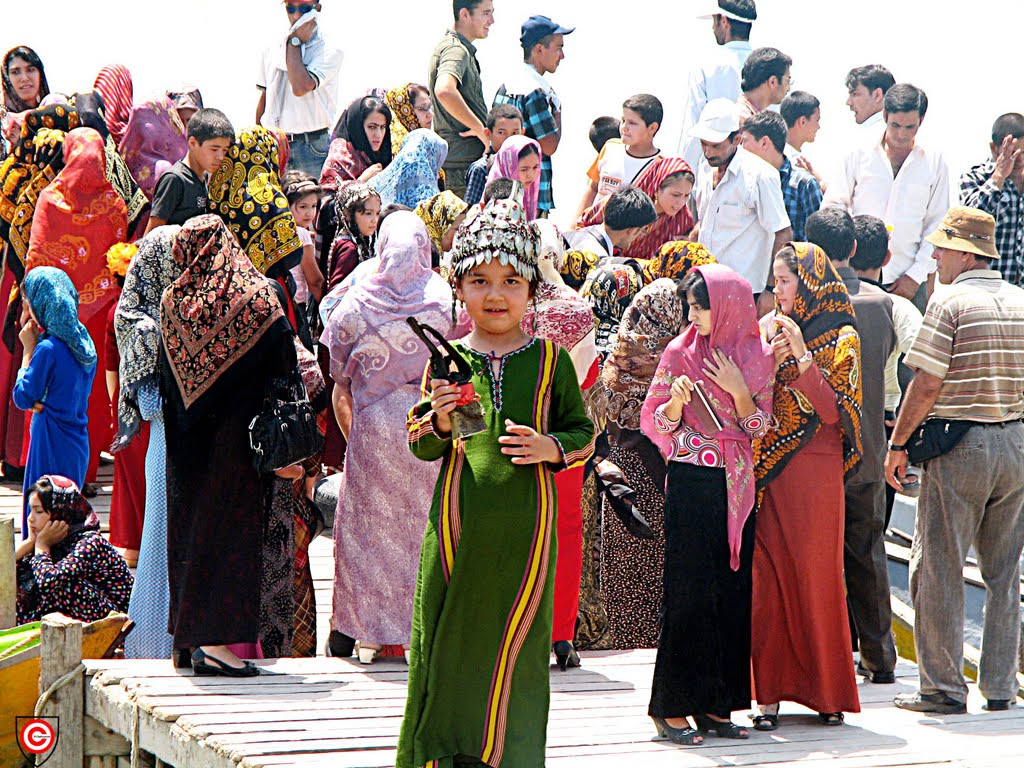
- Turkmens of Bandar-e Torkaman, Iran

Total population
- 500,000–1,000,000; 790,000–1,600,000; 1–2.4 million 1-2% of the total population

Regions with significant populations
- Golestan Province, Razavi Khorasan Province and North Khorasan Province

Languages
- Turkmen, Persian

Religion
- Sunni Islam

Iranian Turkmens (Persian: ترکمن‌های ایران; Turkmen: ایران تۆرکمن‌لری, romanized: Eýranly Türkmenler) are a branch of Turkmen people living mainly in northern and northeastern regions of Iran. Their region is called Turkmen Sahra and includes substantial parts of Golestan Province of Iran. The number of Turkmens in Iran is estimated at 0.5 to 2.4 million people.

== Ethnography ==
Iranian Turkmens have represented a group of semi-nomadic tribes who retained a more traditional way for a long time. The following Turkmen tribes live in Iran: Yomut, Goklen, and Teke.

== Ethnic history ==
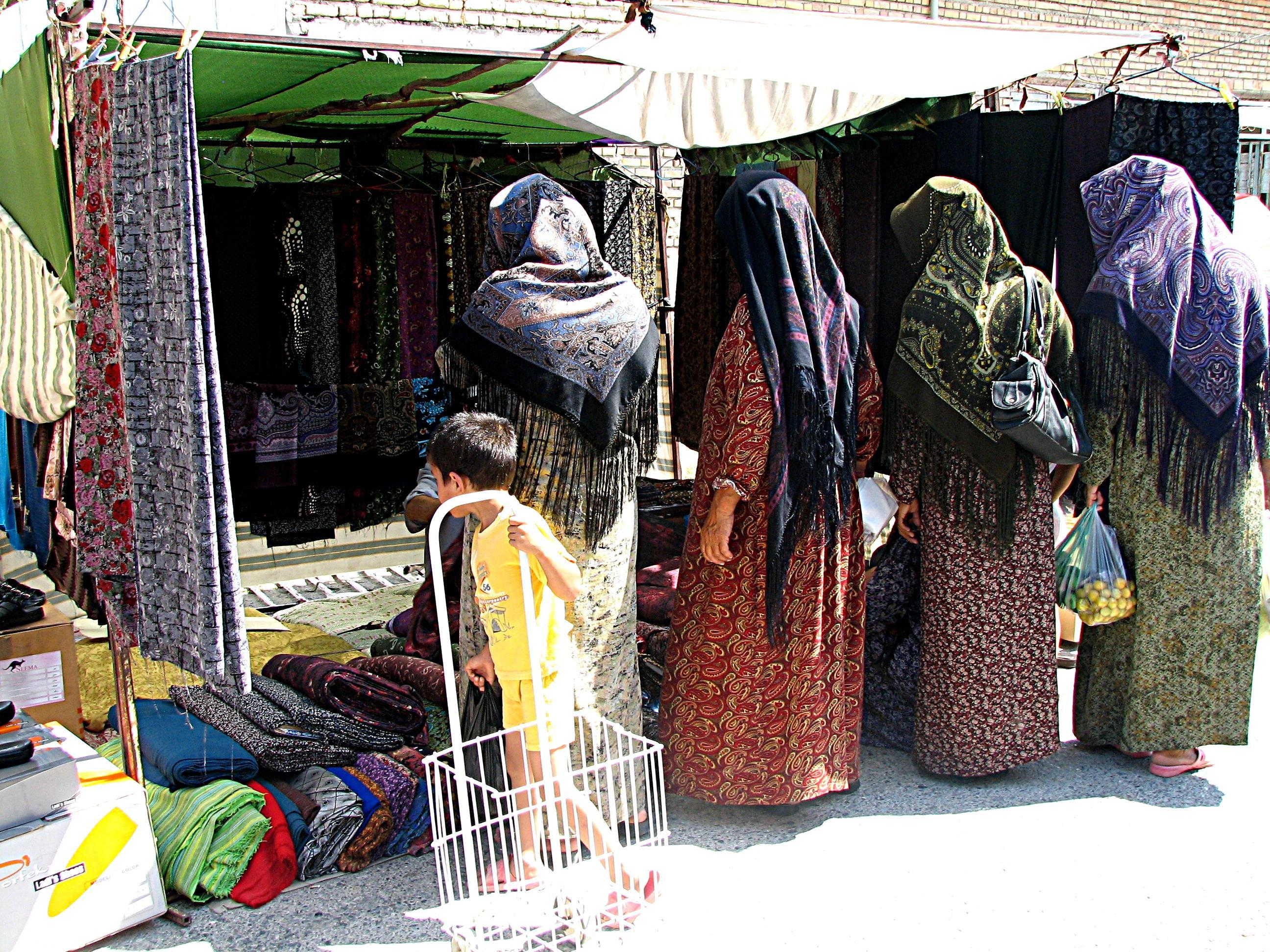
Iranian Turkmens of Ashuradeh island, Iran

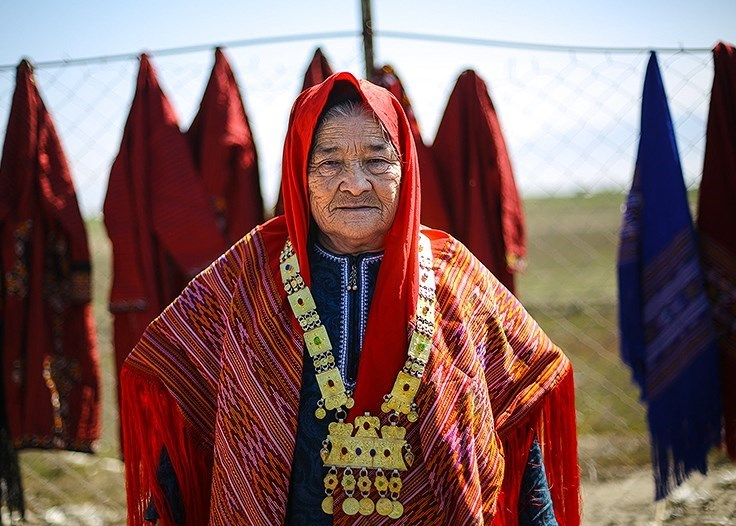
A Turkmen woman of Bandar-e Torkaman, Iran

Representatives of such modern Turkmen tribes as Yomut, Goklen, Īgdīr, Saryk, Salar and Teke have lived in Iran since the 16th century, though ethnic history of Turkmens in Iran starts with the Seljuk conquest of the region in the 11th century.

Throughout the 17th century and the beginning of the 18th century, a process of resettlement of the Turkmen tribes took place in Iran. In the 17th century, it was associated with the intensified exploitation of Turkmens by the Khanate of Khiva and the raids of the Kalmyk feudal lords.

After what Iranian ruler Nader Shah, himself an ethnic Turkmen, defeated Turkmens and Kurds in 1728, he drove part of the Teke and Imreli tribes out and settled them in Khorasan, specifically in the steppe of Astrabad. In the 1740s, Nader Shah conquered the Bukhara and Khiva Khanates. Subsequently, most of the Turkmen Yomuds were forced to move from the Khiva Khanate to the coast of the Caspian Sea and to Astrabad.

Until the Russian conquest of Central Asia, the situation in the areas of residence of Turkmens was turbulent. Under the pretext of jihad, the Khiva Khan repeatedly raided Iranian territory. As an Iranian writer Reza-Qoli Khan wrote, he (the Khiva Khan) "at times led troops against Serakhs and Merv, and sometimes ordered Turkmens to raid the regions of Khorasan". In turn, Iranian troops attacked the Khwarazm, mainly the Turkmen lands, robbing and taking people into captivity.

The movement of the Turkmen tribes was also affected by intertribal contradictions, which quite often turned into serious conflicts. In 1855, Teke Turkmens captured the Merv oasis. The Saryks who lived there were expelled to the Yoloten and Panjdeh oases, and they, in turn, drove the Salurs out of Yoloten. The latter were initially located in the area of present-day Serhetabat, Turkmenistan, and then migrated to Iran, and finally settled 120 km above Serakhs. Later, Iran exploited the struggle between the Saryks and Tekes to organize a campaign to the Merv oasis in 1861. However, it ended in a crushing defeat for the Iranian troops.

== Modern Turkmen tribes in present-day Iran ==
Nearly one million Turkmens can be found living along the northern edges of Iran, just south of the Turkmenistan-Iran border. For centuries, Turkmens had lived as nomadic herdsmen. In more recent years, however, many of them have changed to a "semi-nomadic lifestyle," living in permanent homes as well as in tents. Today, most of them are farmers and cattle breeders. Turkmens still live in extended families where various generations can be found under the same roof, especially in rural areas. Many tribal customs still survive among the modern Turkmens.

== Language ==
Iranian Turkmens speak primarily Southern Turkmen, a variant of the Turkmen language also spoken in Afghanistan. It is currently written in the Perso-Arabic script, though some use the Turkmen Latin script, common in Turkmenistan since its independence in the 1990s.

Southern Turkmen is mutually intelligible with the Turkmen variety spoken in Turkmenistan and Uzbekistan, though it borrows heavily Persian loanwords. There is also a strong Arabic influence in Southern Turkmen.

== Notable Iranian Turkmen ==
- Dowletmammet Azady, Turkmen poet, scholar and Sufi
- Magtymguly Pyragy, Turkmen spiritual leader, philosophical poet and Sufi
- Haj Aghi Alejalil, Iranian philanthropist
- Sardar Azmoun, Iranian footballer who plays for Bayer Leverkusen in the Bundesliga and Iranian National Team.
- Farhad Ghaemi, volleyball player from Iran, who plays as a Spike for the Men's National Team
- Saber Kazemi, volleyball player from Iran, who plays as an opposite spiker for the Men's National Team
- Ezzatollah Pourghaz, Iranian footballer who plays for Esteghlal Khuzestan in the Persian Gulf Pro League
- Omid Kokabee, experimental laser physicist
- Ramin Nourqolipour, Iranian Turkmen politician and scientist who represented a part of Iranian Turkmen community in Iranian Parliament for four years between 2016 and 2020

== See also ==
- Iran–Turkmenistan relations
- Turkmens
- Turkmen tribes
- Turkmen Sahra
- Turkoman horse
- Music of Turkmenistan
- Iranian Turks
- Afghan Turkmens
- Nader Shah
- Afsharid Dynasty
- Afsharid Iran
- Ethnic groups in Iran
