= Vardanjan, Iran =

City in Chaharmahal and Bakhtiari province, Iran

Vardanjan Persian: وردنجان
- City
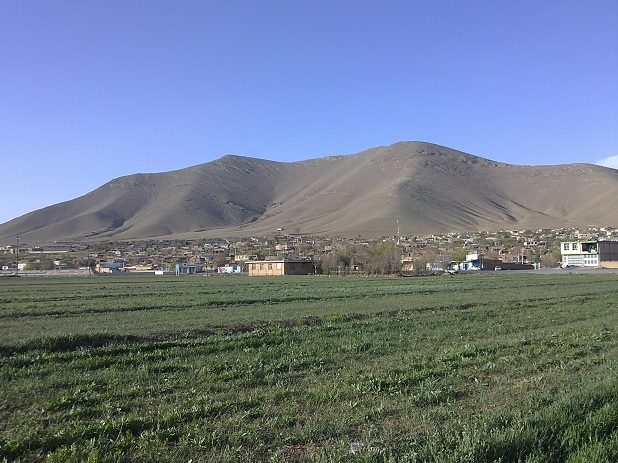
- City of Vardanjan, Iran

- Location within Iran
- Coordinates: 32°28′31″N 50°46′05″E
- Country: Iran
- Province: Chaharmahal and Bakhtiari
- County: Ben
- District: Central
- Established as a city: 2011

Population (2016)
  - Total: 4,456
- Time zone: UTC+3:30 (IRST)

Vardanjan (Persian: وردنجان) (Note: Also romanized as Vardanjān; also known as Vardangūn, Vardaniān, and Wardangun) is a city in the Central District of Ben County, Chaharmahal and Bakhtiari province, Iran. It was the capital of Ben Rural District (Note: Renamed Vardanjan Rural District) until its capital was transferred to the village of Bardeh.

== Demographics ==
=== Ethnicity ===
The city is populated by Persians.

=== Population ===
At the time of the 2006 National Census, the city's population was 4,262 in 1,023 households, when it was a village in Vardanjan Rural District (Note: Formerly Ben Rural District) of the former Ben District in Shahrekord County. The following census in 2011 counted 4,324 people in 1,179 households, by which time the village had been elevated to the status of a city. The 2016 census measured the population of the city as 4,456 people in 1,329 households, when the district had been separated from the county in the establishment of Ben County. Vardanjan and the rural district were transferred to the new Central District.
