= Sangchi =

Sangchi سنگچي
- Village
- Location within Iran
- Coordinates: 36°31′15″N 52°31′39″E
- Country: Iran
- Province: Mazandaran
- County: Babol
- Bakhsh: Lalehabad
- Rural District: Karipey

Population (2006)
  - Total: 250
- Time zone: UTC+3:30 (IRST)
  - Summer (DST): UTC+4:30 (IRDT)

Sangchi (Persian: سنگچي, also Romanized as Sangchī; also known as Sang Chīn) is a village in Karipey Rural District, Lalehabad District, Babol County, Mazandaran Province, Iran. At the 2006 census, its population was 250, in 62 families.
