= Boldaji =

City in Chaharmahal and Bakhtiari province, Iran

Boldaji Persian: بلداجی
- City
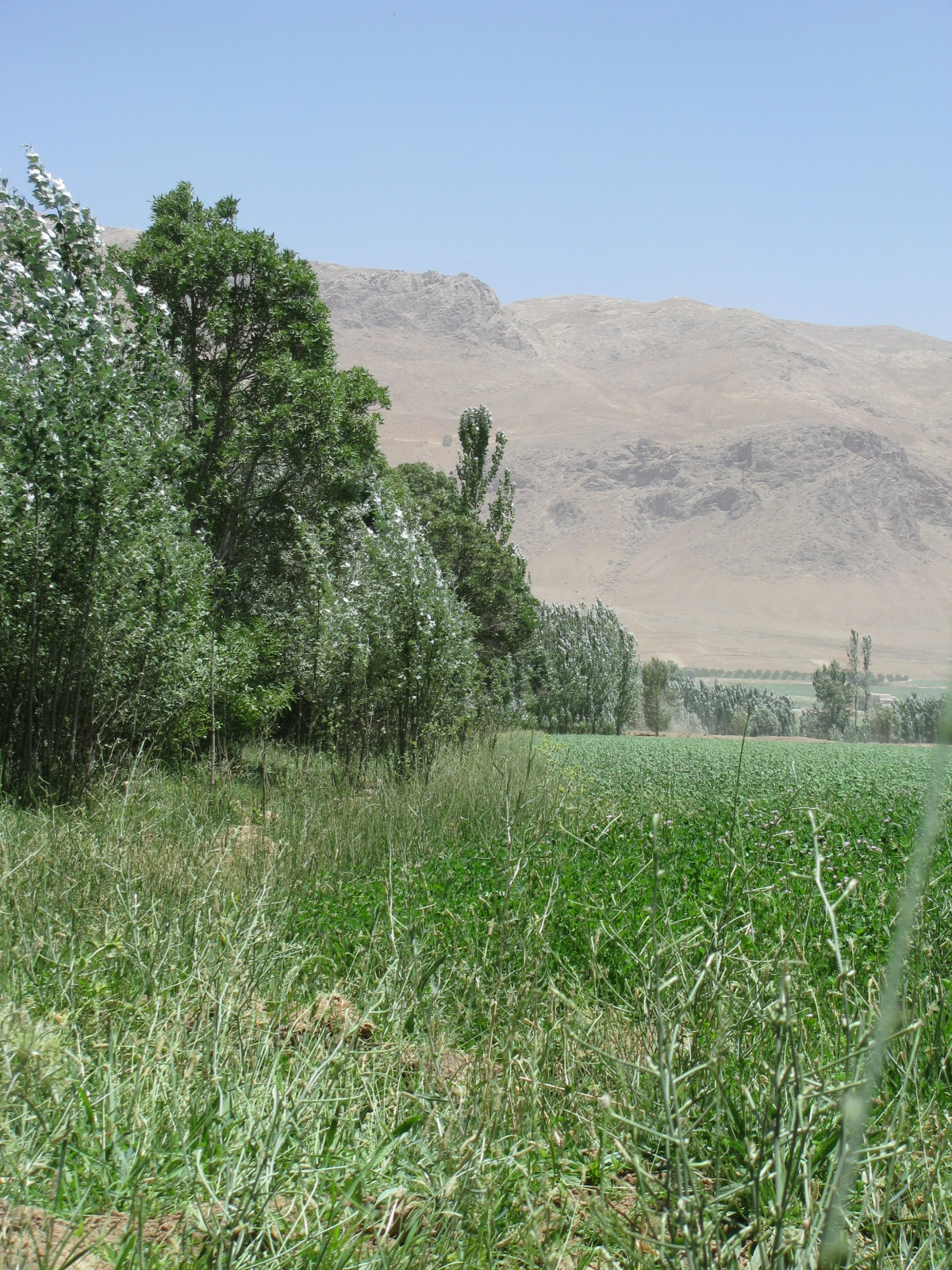
- Landscape in Boldaji

- Location within Iran
- Coordinates: 31°56′08″N 51°03′16″E
- Country: Iran
- Province: Chaharmahal and Bakhtiari
- County: Borujen
- District: Boldaji

Population (2016)
  - Total: 11,980
- Time zone: UTC+3:30 (IRST)

Boldaji (Persian: بلداجی) (Note: Also romanized as Boldājī; also known as Būldāji) is a city in, and the capital of, Boldaji District in Borujen County, Chaharmahal and Bakhtiari province, Iran.

== Demographics ==
=== Ethnicity ===
The city is populated by Turkic people with a small minority of Lurs and Persians.

=== Population ===
At the time of the 2006 National Census, the city's population was 10,905 in 2,598 households. The following census in 2011 counted 11,728 people in 3,267 households. The 2016 census measured the population of the city as 11,980 people in 3,546 households.

== Climate ==
Climate data for Boldaji (2000-2013 normals and extremes)
Month	Jan	Feb	Mar	Apr	May	Jun	Jul	Aug	Sep	Oct	Nov	Dec	Year
Record high °C (°F)	15 (59)	16 (61)	23 (73)	26 (79)	30 (86)	35 (95)	37.0 (98.6)	36 (97)	33 (91)	26 (79)	22 (72)	19 (66)	37.0 (98.6)
Mean daily maximum °C (°F)	5 (41)	7 (45)	13 (55)	17 (63)	23 (73)	29 (84)	32 (90)	31 (88)	28 (82)	22 (72)	13 (55)	7 (45)	19 (66)
Daily mean °C (°F)	−2 (28)	1 (34)	6 (43)	10 (50)	14 (57)	19 (66)	22 (72)	21 (70)	18 (64)	12 (54)	6 (43)	1 (34)	11 (51)
Mean daily minimum °C (°F)	−9 (16)	−5 (23)	−2 (28)	3 (37)	5 (41)	8 (46)	12 (54)	11 (52)	7 (45)	2 (36)	−1 (30)	−6 (21)	2 (36)
Record low °C (°F)	−31.6 (−24.9)	−27 (−17)	−14 (7)	−7 (19)	−2 (28)	0 (32)	5 (41)	5 (41)	0 (32)	−6 (21)	−16 (3)	−28 (−18)	−31.6 (−24.9)
Average precipitation mm (inches)	67 (2.6)	59 (2.3)	61 (2.4)	57 (2.2)	9 (0.4)	2 (0.1)	0 (0)	0 (0)	1 (0.0)	5 (0.2)	61 (2.4)	81 (3.2)	403 (15.8)
Average relative humidity (%)	66	61	50	49	40	32	30	29	30	39	55	64	45
Source: Chaharmahalmet
