= The Persian Encyclopedia =

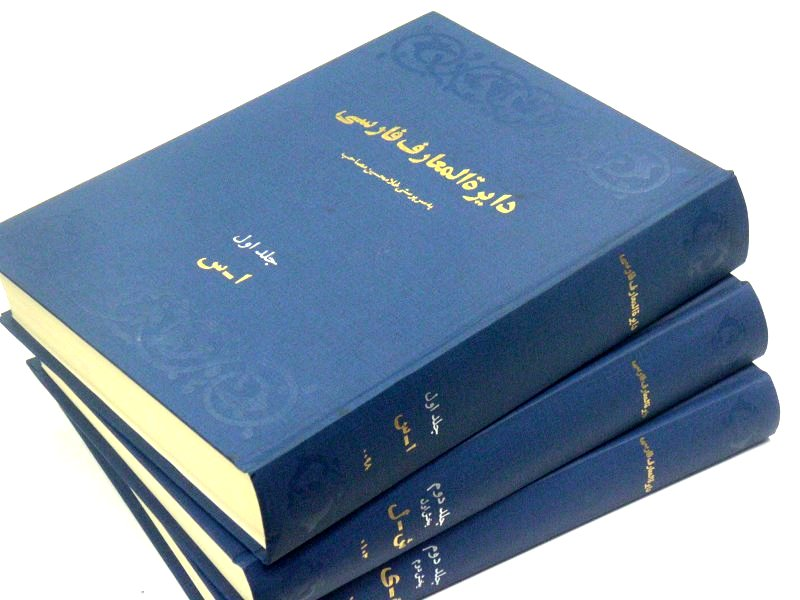
The three volumes of The Persian Encyclopedia

The Persian Encyclopedia (Persian: دایرةالمعارف فارسی; Romanized as Dāyerat-ol-ma'āref-e Fārsi) is one of the most comprehensive and authoritative Encyclopedias written in Persian. It is a two-volume encyclopedia published as three physical volumes.

The encyclopedia was based, in part, on the 1953, 1960, and 1968 editions of The Columbia Viking Desk Encyclopedia. It was initially published under the supervision of Gholamhossein Mosahab. He started the project in 1955 in the Franklin Book Programs office in Tehran. Mosahab left the project after the first volume (words starting with Alef to Seen) was published in 1966.

The second volume was actually published in two "parts", making the encyclopedia three physical volumes. The first part (Sheen to Lām) was published in 1978, ten years after the first volume. It was supervised by Reza Aghsa.

The Iranian revolution in 1979, the death of Mosahab in the same year, and the takeover of the assets of the Franklin office in Tehran by the government delayed further publication.

The second part (Meem to Yeh) was published by Amir Kabir Publishers in 1996, eighteen years after the first part of the volume, but not mentioning a new supervisor's name.

The encyclopedia total is 3385 three-column pages. The encyclopedia contains an introduction that explains in detail the principles and methods of work and how to use the encyclopedia.

This encyclopedia has 43,000 entries, of which 23,000 are foreign entries, 11,000 are related to Iran and Islam, and the rest are reference entries. Foreign entries are generally translations and adaptations, but entries related to Iran are entirely authored.

The three volumes were republished with minor changes by Amir Kabir Publishers in 2002 (ISBN 964-303-044-X).
