= Zayandeh Rud-e Jonubi Rural District =

Rural district in Chaharmahal and Bakhtiari province, Iran

Zayandeh Rud-e Jonubi Rural District Persian: دهستان زاینده‌رود جنوبی
- Rural District
- Location within Iran
- Coordinates: 32°40′N 50°31′E
- Country: Iran
- Province: Chaharmahal and Bakhtiari
- County: Ben
- District: Sheyda
- Established: 1987
- Capital: Azadegan

Population (2016)
  - Total: 1,161
- Time zone: UTC+3:30 (IRST)

Zayandeh Rud-e Jonubi Rural District (Persian: دهستان زاینده‌رود جنوبی) is in Sheyda District of Ben County, Chaharmahal and Bakhtiari province, Iran. Its capital is the village of Azadegan. The previous capital of the rural district was the village of Heydari.

== Demographics ==
=== Population ===
At the time of the 2006 National Census, the rural district's population (as a part of the former Ben District in Shahrekord County) was 5,018 in 1,247 households. There were 4,833 inhabitants in 1,431 households at the following census of 2011. The 2016 census measured the population of the rural district as 1,161 in 240 households, by which time the district had been separated from the county in the establishment of Ben County. The rural district was transferred to the new Sheyda District. The most populous of its three villages was Azadegan, with 789 people.

=== Other villages in the rural district ===
- Jamalvi-ye Jadid
- Pahna
