= Ben, Iran =

City in Chaharmahal and Bakhtiari province, Iran

Ben Persian: بن
- City
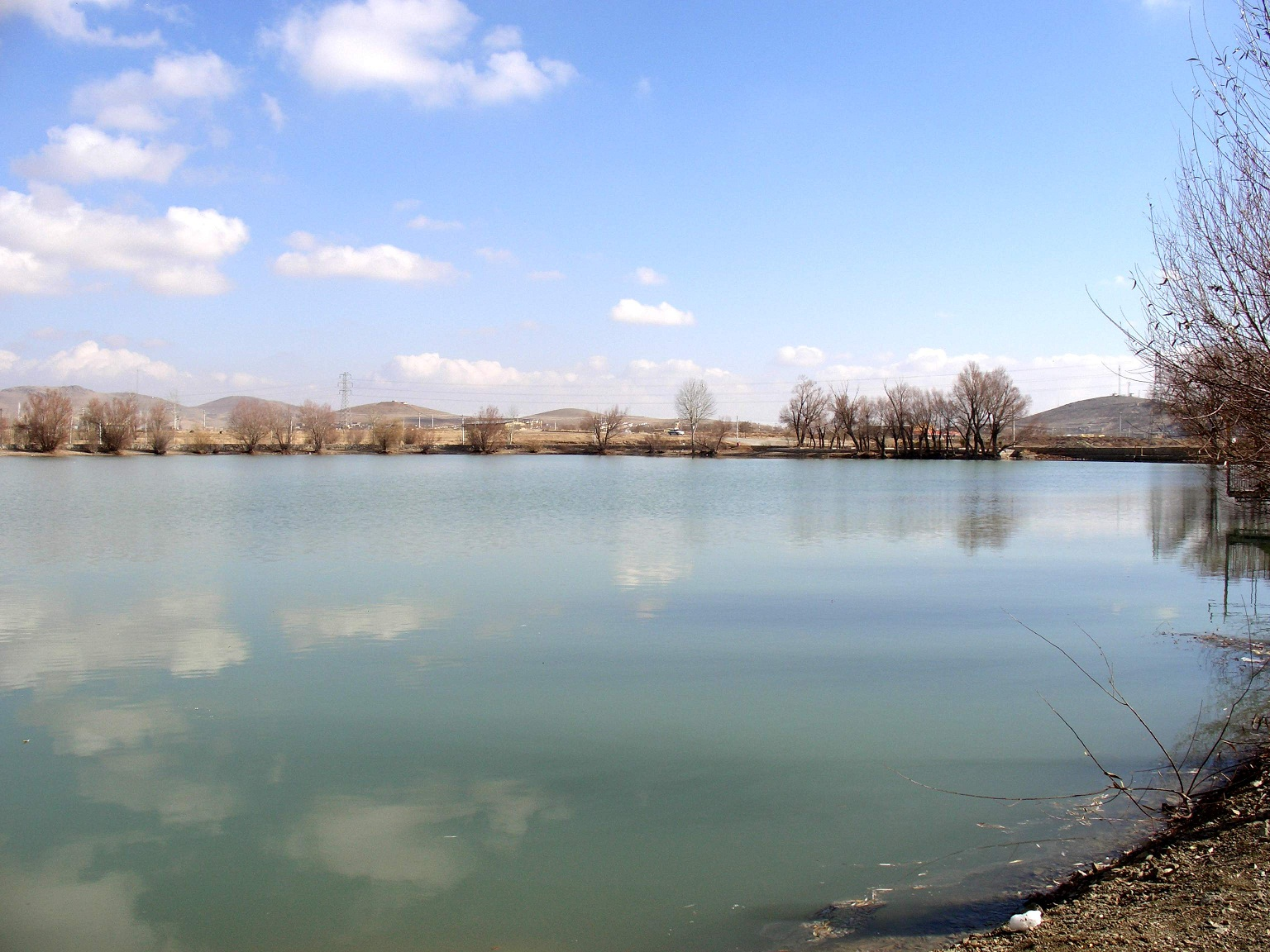
- Ben Whirlpool

- Location within Iran
- Coordinates: 32°32′41″N 50°44′51″E
- Country: Iran
- Province: Chaharmahal and Bakhtiari
- County: Ben
- District: Central

Population (2016)
  - Total: 12,971
- Time zone: UTC+3:30 (IRST)

Ben (Persian: بن) (Note: Also romanized as Bain and Ban) is a city in the Central District of Ben County, Chaharmahal and Bakhtiari province, Iran, serving as capital of both the county and the district.

== Demographics ==
The city is populated by Turkic people with a small Persian minority.

=== Population ===
At the time of the 2006 National Census, the city's population was 11,699 in 3,141 households, when it was in the former Ben District of Shahrekord County. The following census in 2011 counted 11,775 people in 3,534 households. The 2016 census measured the population of the city as 12,971 people in 4,049 households, by which time the district had been separated from the county in the establishment of Ben County. Ben was transferred to the new Central District as the county's capital.

== Climate ==
Climate data for Ben(elevation: 2228m, 1995-2012 precipitation normals)
Month	Jan	Feb	Mar	Apr	May	Jun	Jul	Aug	Sep	Oct	Nov	Dec	Year
Average precipitation mm (inches)	69.7 (2.74)	59.0 (2.32)	51.8 (2.04)	41.4 (1.63)	11.0 (0.43)	3.3 (0.13)	0.3 (0.01)	0.6 (0.02)	0.3 (0.01)	6.0 (0.24)	38.6 (1.52)	65.5 (2.58)	347.5 (13.67)
Source: Chaharmahalmet

== Notable people ==
- Habib Esfahani
