= Sheyda District =

District in Chaharmahal and Bakhtiari province, Iran

Sheyda District Persian: بخش شيدا
- District
- Location within Iran
- Coordinates: 32°40′N 50°38′E
- Country: Iran
- Province: Chaharmahal and Bakhtiari
- County: Ben
- Established: 2013
- Capital: Yan Cheshmeh

Population (2016)
  - Total: 4,702
- Time zone: UTC+3:30 (IRST)

Sheyda District (Persian: بخش شيدا) is in Ben County, Chaharmahal and Bakhtiari province, Iran. Its capital is the city of Yan Cheshmeh.

== History ==
In 2013, Ben District was separated from Shahrekord County in the establishment of Ben County, which was divided into two districts of two rural districts each, with Ben as its capital and only city at the time. The village of Yan Cheshmeh was elevated to the status of a city in 2018.

== Demographics ==
=== Population ===
At the time of the 2016 National Census, the district's population was 4,702 inhabitants living in 1,471 households.

=== Administrative divisions ===
Sheyda District Population
Administrative Divisions	2016
Sheyda RD	3,541
Zayandeh Rud-e Jonubi RD	1,161
Yan Cheshmeh (city) (Note: Became a city after the 2016 census)	
Total	4,702
RD = Rural District
