= Central District (Ben County) =

District in Chaharmahal and Bakhtiari province, Iran

Central District (Ben County) Persian: بخش مرکزی شهرستان بن
- District
- Location within Iran
- Coordinates: 32°33′N 50°37′E
- Country: Iran
- Province: Chaharmahal and Bakhtiari
- County: Ben
- Established: 2013
- Capital: Ben

Population (2016)
  - Total: 23,624
- Time zone: UTC+3:30 (IRST)

The Central District of Ben County (Persian: بخش مرکزی شهرستان بن) is in Chaharmahal and Bakhtiari province, Iran. Its capital is the city of Ben.

== History ==
In 2013, Ben District was separated from Shahrekord County in the establishment of Ben County, which was divided into two districts of two rural districts each, with Ben as its capital and only city at the time.

== Demographics ==
=== Population ===
At the time of the 2016 National Census, the district's population was 23,624 inhabitants living in 7,328 households.

=== Administrative divisions ===
Central District (Ben County) Population
Administrative Divisions	2016
Howmeh RD	3,194
Vardanjan RD (Note: Formerly Ben Rural District)	3,003
Ben (city)	12,971
Vardanjan (city)	4,456
Total	23,624
RD = Rural District
