= Vardanjan Rural District =

Rural district in Chaharmahal and Bakhtiari province, Iran

Vardanjan Rural District Persian: دهستان وردنجان
- Rural District
- Location within Iran
- Coordinates: 32°32′N 50°37′E
- Country: Iran
- Province: Chaharmahal and Bakhtiari
- County: Ben
- District: Central
- Established: 1987
- Capital: Bardeh

Population (2016)
  - Total: 3,003
- Time zone: UTC+3:30 (IRST)

Vardanjan Rural District (Persian: دهستان وردنجان) (Note: Formerly Ben Rural District (دهستان بن)) is in the Central District of Ben County, Chaharmahal and Bakhtiari province, Iran. Its capital is the village of Bardeh. The previous capital of the rural district was the village of Vardanjan, now a city.

== Demographics ==
=== Population ===
At the time of the 2006 National Census, the rural district's population (as a part of the former Ben District in Shahrekord County) was 11,014 in 2,668 households. There were 8,549 inhabitants in 2,365 households at the following census of 2011. The 2016 census measured the population of the rural district as 3,003 in 931 households, by which time the district had been separated from the county in the establishment of Ben County. The rural district was transferred to the new Central District. The most populous of its four villages was Bardeh, with 2,356 people.

=== Other villages in the rural district ===
- Tumanak
