= Chaghakhor Rural District =

Rural district in Chaharmahal and Bakhtiari province, Iran

Chaghakhor Rural District Persian: دهستان چغاخور
- Rural District
- Location within Iran
- Coordinates: 31°51′N 50°56′E
- Country: Iran
- Province: Chaharmahal and Bakhtiari
- County: Borujen
- District: Boldaji
- Established: 1987
- Capital: Avargan

Population (2016)
  - Total: 5,216
- Time zone: UTC+3:30 (IRST)

Chaghakhor Rural District (Persian: دهستان چغاخور) is in Boldaji District of Borujen County, Chaharmahal and Bakhtiari province, Iran. Its capital is the village Avargan.

== Demographics ==
=== Population ===
At the time of the 2006 National Census, the rural district's population was 8,119 in 1,743 households. There were 6,139 inhabitants in 1,550 households at the following census of 2011. The 2016 census measured the population of the rural district as 5,216 in 1,517 households. The most populous of its 10 villages was Avargan, with 2,041 people.

=== Other villages in the rural district ===
- Dastgerd
- Sibak
