= Ben County =

County in Chaharmahal and Bakhtiari province, Iran

Ben County Persian: شهرستان بن
- County
- Location of Ben County in Chaharmahal and Bakhtiari province (top, green)

- Location of Chaharmahal and Bakhtiari province in Iran
- Coordinates: 32°34′N 50°40′E
- Country: Iran
- Province: Chaharmahal and Bakhtiari
- Established: 2013
- Capital: Ben
- Districts: Central, Sheyda

Population (2016)
  - Total: 28,326
- Time zone: UTC+3:30 (IRST)

Ben County (Persian: شهرستان بن) is in Chaharmahal and Bakhtiari province, Iran. Its capital is the city of Ben.

== History ==
In 2013, Ben District was separated from Shahrekord County in the establishment of Ben County, which was divided into two districts of two rural districts each, with Ben as its capital and only city at the time. In 2018, the village of Yan Cheshmeh was elevated to the status of a city.

== Demographics ==
=== Population ===
At the time of the 2016 National Census, the county's population was 28,326, in 8,799 households.

=== Administrative divisions ===
Ben County's population and administrative structure are shown in the following table.

Ben County Population
Administrative Divisions	2016
Central District	23,624
Howmeh RD	3,194
Vardanjan RD (Note: Formerly Ben Rural District)	3,003
Ben (city)	12,971
Vardanjan (city)	4,456
Sheyda District	4,702
Sheyda RD	3,541
Zayandeh Rud-e Jonubi RD	1,161
Yan Cheshmeh (city) (Note: Became a city after the 2016 census)	
Total	28,326
RD = Rural District

== See also ==
Media related to Ben County at Wikimedia Commons
