= Boldaji District =

District in Chaharmahal and Bakhtiari province, Iran

Boldaji District Persian: بخش بلداجی
- District
- Location within Iran
- Coordinates: 31°54′N 50°58′E
- Country: Iran
- Province: Chaharmahal and Bakhtiari
- County: Borujen
- Established: 2001
- Capital: Boldaji

Population (2016)
  - Total: 19,765
- Time zone: UTC+3:30 (IRST)

Boldaji District (Persian: بخش بلداجی) is in Borujen County, Chaharmahal and Bakhtiari province, Iran. Its capital is the city of Boldaji.

== Demographics ==
=== Population ===
At the time of the 2006 National Census, the district's population was 19,708 in 4,510 households. The following census in 2011 counted 20,688 people in 5,606 households. The 2016 census measured the population of the district as 19,765 inhabitants living in 5,824 households.

=== Administrative divisions ===
Boldaji District Population
Administrative Divisions	2006	2011	2016
Chaghakhor RD	8,119	6,139	5,216
Emamzadeh Hamzeh Ali RD	684	2,821	2,569
Boldaji (city)	10,905	11,728	11,980
Total	19,708	20,688	19,765
RD = Rural District
