= Ben District =

Former district in Chaharmahal and Bakhtiari province, Iran

Ben District Persian: بخش بن
- Former District
- Location within Iran
- Coordinates: 32°34′N 50°40′E
- Country: Iran
- Province: Chaharmahal and Bakhtiari
- County: Shahrekord
- Established: 1995
- Capital: Ben

Population (2011)
  - Total: 29,481
- Time zone: UTC+3:30 (IRST)

Ben District (Persian: بخش بن) is a former administrative division of Shahrekord County, Chaharmahal and Bakhtiari province, Iran. Its capital was the city of Ben.

== History ==
In 2013, the district was separated from the county in the establishment of Ben County.

== Demographics ==
=== Population ===
At the time of the 2006 National Census, the district's population was 27,731 in 7,056 households. The following census in 2011 counted 29,481 people in 8,509 households.

=== Administrative divisions ===
Ben District Population
Administrative Divisions	2006	2011
Vardanjan RD (Note: Formerly Ben Rural District)	11,014	8,549
Zayandeh Rud-e Jonubi RD	5,018	4,833
Ben (city)	11,699	11,775
Vardanjan (city)		4,324
Total	27,731	29,481
RD = Rural District
