= Cinema of Turkmenistan =

The cinema of Turkmenistan dates back to the 1920s, when the country was within the Soviet Union. Since independence in 1991, Turkmenistan has had the most limited film production industry of any Central Asian state.

== History ==
=== Early years - 1920s and 30s ===
The first documentary to be produced in Turkmenistan itself was Provozglashenie Turkmenskoi SSR (Proclamation of the Turkmen Soviet Socialist Republic) in 1925, by Sergei Lebedev and Boris Bashem, two Russian cameramen from the Sevzapkino film studio in Leningrad. On 7 February 1926, The Council of People’s Commissars of the Turkmen SSR issued a decree to establish a "film-factory". The Ashgabat Kinofabrica was accordingly founded in Turkmenistan's capital city the following year, and their output consisted exclusively of documentaries, propaganda films and newsreels. (Note: Example include For Elections to the Soviets [K perevyboram sovetov] or Celebrating the Tenth Anniversary of the October Revolution in Ashkhabad [Prazdnovanie 10-i godovshchiny Oktiabr’skoi revoliutsii v Ashkhabade].) Their exhibitions were often accompanied by educational lectures on the themes and Swetlana Slapke, former cultural historian at the Humboldt University deems the productions to have been uniformly characterized by "propaganda and ideological tendentiousness".

The first feature-length documentary to be produced from Kinofabrica was Alexander Vladychuk's Beloe Zeloto (White Gold) in 1929, which focused on collectivization in the cotton industry. The same year, Yevgeni Ivanov-Barkov made a successful film Judas, but left the industry soon. In 1930, the first feature film Zemlya Zhazhdet (The Earth is Thirsty) was produced by Yuli Raizman; it was about five Komsomol enthusiasts fertilizing the desert scapes amidst all adversities and bringing in a communist transformation. This film was made for Vostokkino (Note: Vostokkino, meaning ‘eastern cinema’ or ‘Oriental cinema’, was a film trust launched by Soviet officials and intellectuals from the Scientific Oriental Association in Moscow in 1926. The creation of Vostokkino reflected Bolshevik policy to promote non-Russian nationalities in various spheres of public life and temper their quest for the expression of national identity.) and was originally silent, but had a soundtrack added a few months later for public consumption.

In the 1930s, numerous local director and cameramen - Vladimir Lavrov, Djavanshir Mamedov, Nikolai Mikhailovich Kopysov, Djuma Nepesov and Shadurdy Annaev - joined the studio. The first feature-length sound-film was Alexander Ledashchev's I'll Be Back (1935), which was based on Oraz Tachnazarov’s epic theater-drama Batrak about the trials of a young laborer. Its release was accompanied by festive screenings, involving a military brass band. Slapke notes that the film left a strong impression upon the audience for "it was the first feature film in their lives and about their lives".

=== 1940s ===
In 1939, the Kinofabrica was reorganized as Turkmenfilm Studio.

The first film shot at the new studio was Dursun (1940), directed by Yevgeni Ivanov-Barkov, who returned after about a decade and would go on to become a keystone figure in the initial development of Turkmen national cinema. The film had a complex-layered plot centered around a traditional elite man Nury (played by Alty Karliev) coming to terms with his wife Dursun (played by Nina Alisova) subverting gendered stereotypes, after she joins the Communist Party's Youth League. The film was based on a careful study of Turkmen culture and traditions; Karliev won a Stalin prize and has since considered it to be his best role. Slapke deems the film to be his most impressive work. Apart from Nina, all other actors were of Turkmen descent and had no prior experience in cinema.

In 1941, the Kiev Film Studio was evacuated to Ashgabat as a result of the Second World War. Ukrainian directors of repute partnered with the Turkmenfilm to make newsreels and other films; Ivanov-Barkov produced The Procurator (1941) during these spans. Slapke argues that there was a noticeable improvement in the professional - and especially technical - competence of Turkmen film-makers during this span.

The first film after the War was Ivanov-Barkov's The Distant Bride (1948), a musical comedy which was met with widespread popular reception across the Soviet Union with Karliev winning another Stalin prize; it remains his most popular film though Slapke and others have since taken a poor view of the work. (Note: Slapke notes :- "Although some remarkable actors, including Karliev and Aman Kulmamedov, appeared in the film, it suffered as a whole from being schematic and superficial, concealed beneath a wealth of ethnographic material and oriental colour." Rollberg notes :- "In the post-Stalinist period, the film was blamed for its conflict avoidance and blatant lies about the reality of Turkmenistan.") The Turkmen cinema industry virtually ceased to exist months later, when the Turkmenfilm building was destroyed in the 1948 Ashgabat earthquake; among the casualties were numerous film artists. Nearby studios in Baku and Tashkent (since located in other Central Asian nations) produced very small number of newsreels and documentaries on Turkmen themes during these times.

=== 1950s ===
The Turkmenfilm studio was rebuilt in the 1950s, and it began producing feature films again. The first post-reconstruction films were by Rafail Perelshtein — The Shepherd's Son (1954) and The Cunning of Old Ashir (1955).

The 50s saw the rise of Alty Karliev as a director, whom Slapke describes as the indisputable founder of Turkmen national cinema. Coming from a background of popular theater and having made a name for himself as an actor reflecting national spirits, he co-produced the first colour film Extraordinary Mission in 1957 with Ivanov-Barkov about the exploits of a state-agent during the Russian Civil War. Ayna (1960) was his next directorial venture covering the complex travails of a young female communist during the times of collectivization. Slapke notes both of them to be unpersuasive, in nature. He was the artistic director of Turkmenfilm Studio from 1956 to 1960.

=== 1960s ===
The 1960s was a significant decade for Turkmen filmmaking. In 1961, the Central Committee of the Turkmen Communist Party issued a decree titled “On Major Insufficiencies in the Work of Turkmenfilm” which led to more people joining the cinema industry. Where previously, most of the films produced in the Turkmen studio had involvement from Russian and Ukrainian directors, now, a new generation of Turkmen filmmakers — the first Turkmen graduates of the Gerasimov Institute of Cinematography (Yazgeldy Seidov, Kurban Yazhanov, Murad Kurbanklychev, Khodzhakuli Narliev, Mukhamed Soiunkhanov et al) — emerged, and were subsequently responsible for most of the Turkenfilm productions. Also, Khrushchev Thaw changed the cultural scapes in that artistic freedom increased vastly and Union of Cinematographers of Turkmenistan was set up in 1965.

Thus, Bulat Mansurov's student-diploma work Contest (1963) became the first Turkmen film to gain international attention, and simultaneously birthed poetic cinema. (Note: Slapke describes of the film as "that was purely national in form but profoundly humanistic in content".) Deriving from Nurmurat Sarykhanov's novel Shukur-Bakhshi about a musician who travels to enemy territory to champion peace, Mansurov tackled the perpetual duel between good and evil and the need of state to wield power over subjects. Aman Khandurdyev and Khodjan Ovezgelenov who played the lead roles were amateurs but pulled off highly convincing and impressive performances; Nury Halmammedov's tragic score has since become a classic and Khodzhakuli Narliev (though, of Soviet descent) made his name as a cameraman.

Mansurov went on to produce Quenching the Thirst (1966) based on a novel by Yuri Trifonov covering the friendship between workers who built the Karakum Canal and The Slave Girl (1968) based on a short story by Andrei Platonov covering the emancipation of a girl from slavery; both had Narliev as cameraman. The films generated public interest but were creatively poorer, per Slapke. Peter Rollberg, Professor of Slavic Languages and Film Studies at George Washington University however deems the former to have had introduced a "daring visual style" and notes that critics hold the latter to be his best work. Mansurov's last film (in Turkmenistan) was a WWII parable There Is No Death, Pals (1970) before he emigrated to Kazakshtan and then, Moscow where he continued to direct and produce films.

In 1965, Karliev directed The Decisive Step based on Berdi Kerbabayev's work about a young Turkmen labourer searching for love and justice during the tectonic shifts in historical consciousness happening across the aftermath of October Revolution and Civil War. The film had an accurate representation of Turkmen life, Baba Annanov and Artyk Djallyev were superb in their lead roles, and Nury Halmammedov's score blending Turkmen folk motifs with European symphony was impressive as well. Widely considered to be his magisterial work, it has since gained a cult status. Karliev went on to produce two more biographical films — Magtymguly (1968, starring Khommat Mullyk and Mukhammed Cherkezov) about Magtymguly Pyragy and The Secrets of Maqam (1974) about Karkara — which were met with popular success but were dramaturgically inferior; his last work was The Border is Behind the River (1971).

=== 1970s and 80s ===
The 70s saw the rise of Khodzhakuli Narliev as a director. Narliev's signature style of film-making — low, barren, mono-toned and deceptively simplistic yet richly poetic, capturing the dignified eternal lives of Turkmen women in all its intricate tragic grinds yet compelling the audience to reflect and hope for better — won many critics, who often deemed of him as the Turkmen Fellini. He was to head the film union from 1976 (won unanimously) to 1998, significantly improving the now-renamed Alty Karliev Turkmenfilm Studio and commanded tremendous influence in the film industry.

A student of Boris Volchek and already an acclaimed cameraman, his first directorial venture was Man Overboard (1969) about the moral conflict of a fisherman who failed to save his friend from the seas; Slapke found it to be a sincere and impressive debut. He garnered critical acclaim for his next film Nevestka (Daughter-in-Law) which is widely considered as the zenith of Turkmen cinema. Featuring Maya-Gozel Aimedova (who would feature in each of his film, and be his future-wife) in lead role as a widow who engages in an eternal wait for her (dead) soldier-husband and refuses to remarry in her bid to remain loyal to the idea of love whilst taking care of her father-in-law.

His next film was When a Woman Saddles a Horse (1974, Aimedova wrote the script), a historical drama modeled on one of his relative, a pioneer female revolutionary and which portrayed the difficulties of an oriental woman in bringing structural changes within a society. You Must be Able to Say No (1976) was a pamphlet against the tradition of bride-purchase. Both the films were an antithesis to the atypical traditionalist themes found in his works in that he rejected blind allegiance to traditions; the former was dedicated to Ene Kuliyeva, the head of the first Women’s Section (Zhenotdel) of Soviet Turkmenistan. In 1980, Narliev directed Jamal’s Tree (Aimedova wrote the script) in what Slapke deems as his ode to all Turkmen mothers, it portrayed the sacrifices of a lady in her continued abidance by traditional structures even at times when they were of no particular use and thus being the custodian of life. (Note: The lady's husband returned from a War disabled, only to face rumors about his wife’s infidelity. But the wife, rather than confront and put an end prefers to remain mute and perform her womanly duties.) In '82 he directed Karakum: 45˚ C in the Shade drawing from Mansurov's earlier work. In 1984, Narliev, at the request of the republican leadership, directed a biographical film Fragi, Deprived of Happiness on the event of the 250th birth anniversary of Magtymguly Pyragy. The two-part film covered the early life of the philosopher (esp. his tragic love for a childhood romantic interest) and met popular success as well as critical acclaim.

In 1982, Usman Saparov made his name as a children's film director, debuting with The Masculine Upbringing which had a highly successful run, and won him a USSR State Prize. In 1989, he directed Halima documenting the reality of Turkmen life characterized by corruption and moral decay. Several other films and documentaries (about five full-length features, several animates shorts and about 50 dubs of foreign films, every year) were produced in these two decades which are since considered to be the heyday of Turkmen cinema, with over 900 functioning projectors in the republic. A monthly news almanac (Soviet Turkmenistan) and a satirical almanac (The Spear) were published by Turkenfilm, as well.

=== 1990s-present ===
==== Early 90s ====
Narliev's last film was Mankurt (1990) was a cross-country venture featuring crew from Turkey and Libya and was partially filmed in Syria as well as Turkey. Based on a narrative strand from The Day Lasts More than a Hundred Years (1980) by Chinghiz Aitmatov (who suggested the screenplay), it drew from the Turkic legends of Mankurt, in depicting a non-traditional Turkman who fails to defend his homeland from invasion by Chinese troops. Afterwards, as he is captured, tortured, and brainwashed into serving the invaders, he is so completely turned that he even fails to recognise his mother (portrayed by Aimedova) and murders her, when she attempts to rescue him. Then First Secretary of the Turkmen Communist Party, Saparmurat Niyazov who was increasingly becoming authoritarian took umbrage with the film, and banned its distribution. (Note: Its premiere was finally held at the East-West Festival in Baku in September 2007.)

After Turkmenistan gained independence in 1991, the film movement initially flourished. Seminars and workshops were held for Central Asian cinema artists, the film-studio was set to be expanded in the outskirts of Ashkabad (for reconstructing an aul) with grants from Moscow, and a new generation of directors — Shikhmurat Annamuratov, Sergei Shchugarev, Biulbiul Mamedov, Khalmamed Kakabaev, Kerim Annanov, Murat Aliev, Eduard Redzhepov, Bairam Abdullayev et al — were gradually taking over the legacy of Narliev.

Saparov’s Little Angel, Make Me Happy (1992) narrated the tale of a boy who was left behind in a post-WWII purge of German villagers, and went on to receive the most prestigious award in the children’s category at the 43rd Berlin International Film Festival. Other films of the 90s include Legend of My Youth (1992), Karakum (dir. Saparaov, 1994), The Soul is Burnt Out (1995), Fragrance of Wishes (dir. Shchugarev, 1996), Repentance (dir. Kakabaev, 1996) and Children of the Earthquake (dir. Aliev, 1997).

==== Late 90s and early 2000s ====
However by the late 90s, Saparmurat Niyazov's (now, President) atavistic and totalitarian reign was at its peak, the country was increasingly isolationist, and all forms of art bearing no relationship to traditional folklore were censored. Filmmakers were forced to engage in government propaganda or stand accused of lacking patriotism and face financial difficulties. Many chose to emigrate Moscow-wards (Narliev, Saparaov, Aliev et al) while some (Kakabaev et al) conformed. (Note: Gönul Dönmez-Colin's interview of Kakabaev at the Cottbus Film Festival, 2006 is interesting :- Q: According to Sergei Shugarev, a film-maker from the younger generation, Turkmenistan is a closed system that persecutes people who think differently and dissidence is not allowed. A: Shugarev is not a dissident. He was my assistant. He was given the opportunity to practice his trade in Turkmenistan; he chose to go to Moscow. He can come and work in Turkmenistan whenever he wants. He should not be spreading lies. Q: Why do we not see political films interrogating the recent past or the present changes? A: In Turkmenistan, we have had political stability for nine years. We have not had a single political conflict with any party. Why create an artificial situation?) The Union of Cinematographers was dissolved in 1998; the Turkmenfilm studio was demolished a year or two earlier to construct a highway (or variably, a sports-stadium).

In 1999, Baba Annanov's son Kerim Annanov directed Legend, a 90-minute long parable-cinema, in what was the last film under Niyazov-presidency; Slapke remarked of this to be a fine example of Soviet cinematography. About a father who tries to stop his sons from infighting in order to establish a peaceful life before succumbing to failure, Niyazov sensed parallels with Mankurt and banned distribution. Film production in Turkmenistan virtually ceased thereafter and the very occasional cinematic activity were restricted to consulate-arranged film screenings.

Contemporary cinematic forms failed to develop unlike other Central Asian republics. In 2003 the film studio, having a paper-existence and downgraded to a mere association of film-producers, was merged with Turkmen Television into "Turkmentelekinofilm". In 2006, Kakabaev, a pro-regime director asserted that there were 20 active feature-film makers, but they lacked the possibility of shooting 35-mm films; an Academy of Fine Arts was scheduled to have its first graduates in artistic film making that year.

==== Berdimuhamedow and present ====
Restrictions relaxed after Gurbanguly Berdimuhamedow ascended to the presidency upon Niyazov's death in December, 2006.

Restoration of old classics began and unused cinema halls were refurbished back. In 2007, the film-studio was reinstated and renamed after Oghuz Khagan; an international film festival was held at Ashgabat in 2008. Film production was resumed (circa 2010) with state patronage. Kerim Annanov directed a short film Autumn in 2009. In August 2010, Berdimuhamedow urged Turkmentelekinofilm to establish cooperation with major film companies of the world, and create a new movie about Turkmenistan. A 3D theater was opened in 2011 and another two in 2012; a 3D film was produced, as well. Films of other countries are being screened regularly since around 2010, as are old Turkmen classics; state-owned TV channels broadcast them as well.

In 2012, a film was produced on Golden Age Lake at Berdimuhamedow's request. On the occasion of the eighth Eurasia International Film Festival at Almaty, artistic director Gulnara Abikeyeva noted that she did not receive any film from Turkmenistan and while film-making had recently resumed in Turkmenistan, it was limited to historical themes. In 2013, a feature was produced. In 2015, another feature was produced chronicling a young engineer employed in the construction of Kazakhstan-Turkmenistan-Iran railway.

In 2016, a law was passed that laid down parameters on deeming films as "national" (or not) and accordingly, promote and conserve them on behalf of the state; creative freedom was however guaranteed in all cases. In 2017, a feature film was produced about Turkmen's fondness of breeding horses. In 2020, three feature films were produced on the 25th anniversary of Turkmenistan vouching at the UN to maintain neutrality in all political conflicts; another was made on a book written by Berdimuhamedow.

== See also ==
- List of Turkmenistan films
- Cinema of Central Asia
