= List of Turkmenistan films =

This is a list of films produced in Turkmenistan. For a discussion on the cinema of Turkmenistan, see Cinema of Turkmenistan.

== A ==
- Akpamyk (1996)
- Angelochek sdelay radost (1993)
- Archaly Adam (1995)

== C ==
- Çapar (2022)
- Contest (1964)

== D ==
- Destan moey yunosti (1992)

== H ==
- Ham hyyal (1996)

== K ==
- Karakum (1994)

== M ==
- Mal, da udal (1974)
- Mankurt (1990)
- Muzhskoye vospitaniye (1983)

== N ==
- Neschastnaya indyanka (1992)
- Nevestka (1972)
- Nejep oglan (2019)

== O ==
- Okhlamon (1993)

== P ==
- Prikluchenia Aldar-Kose (1970)

== Q ==
- Quenching the Thirst (1968)

== T ==
- Tree Dzhamal (1981)

== Y ==
- Yandym (1995)
