= Sary-Ozek =

Sary-Ozek or Saryozek may refer to one of the following, related to places in Kazakhstan.

- Sary-Ozek station, a railway station
- Sary-Ozek, Almaty Region, a settlement in Kazakhstan's Almaty Region
- Sary-Ozek, Jambyl Region, a settlement in Kazakhstan's Jambyl Region
- Sary-Ozek military range, witnessed demolition of Soviet ICBMs
- Sary-Ozek. Farewell to Arms, a 1988 documentary about ICBM demolition
- Sary-Ozek or Sarozek, a fictional cosmodrome and desert in Chingiz Aitmatov's novel The Day Lasts More Than a Hundred Years
