= Mankurt (film) =

1990 Soviet film directed by Hojaguly Narliyev

- Russian poster
- Turkmen: Mankurt
- Directed by: Hojaguly Narliyev
- Written by: Mariya Urmadova
- Based on: The Day Lasts More Than a Hundred Years by Chinghiz Aitmatov
- Starring: Tarık Tarcan; Maya-Gozel Aymedova; Yılmaz Duru; Hojadurdy Narliyev; Maysa Almazova
- Cinematography: Nurtay Borbiyev
- Music by: Rejep Rejepov
- Production companies: Turkmenfilm; Tugra Film
- Release date: 1990 (Soviet Union)
- Running time: 86 minutes
- Countries: Soviet Union; Turkey; Libya
- Languages: Turkmen; Russian; Turkish

Mankurt (Russian: Манкурт; Turkish: Gün Uzar Yüzyıl Olur) is a 1990 Soviet film written by Mariya Urmadova and directed by Hojaguly Narliyev. The main cast were the Turkish actors Tarık Tarcan and Yılmaz Duru and the Turkmen actors Maya-Gozel Aymedova and Hojadurdy Narliyev.

== Background ==
The film was partially filmed on location in Syria and in Turkey, representing a Turkish-Soviet cooperation in filmmaking. The film is based on the fictional legend about a mankurt within the novel The Day Lasts More Than a Hundred Years ("И дольше века длится день") by Chinghiz Aitmatov, a philosophical tale about what can happen to people if they forget their motherland, language, and history. The Turkic legend invented by Aitmatov for the novel conceives of a cruel way of turning captives into mankurts so that they will forget everything but basic activities, rendering them servile minions to Zunghar conquerors.

== Synopsis ==
The film is about a Turkmen who defended his homeland from invasion. He is captured, tortured, and brainwashed into serving his homeland's conquerors. He is so completely turned that he does not recognize his mother and kills her when she attempts to return his memories.

== Cast ==
- Maya-Gozel Aimedova
- Nurberdi Allaberdiyev
- Maysa Almazova
- Baba Annanov
- Kerim Annanov
- Yılmaz Duru
- Altyn Hojayeva
- Hommat Myllyk
- Hojadurdy Narliyev
- Salem Hamudov
- Mergen Niyazov
- Maya Nuryagdiyeva
- Sapar Odayev
- Tarık Tarcan

== See also ==
- Mankurt
- Pitchcapping
