= The day lasts for more than a century (2019 play) =

- Original language: Tatar
- Written by: Chingiz Aytmatov
- Music by: Elmir Nizamov

Premiere
- Date: 4 November 2018
- Place: Kamal Theatre
- Directed by: İlgiz Zӓyniev

“The day lasts for more than a century...”, also “Eternal Blizzard” (2018) – one of the significant performances of the Tatar Academic Theater named after. Ğ. Kamal in the Tatar language of the late 2010s. The premiere of the play at the Ğaliӓsğӓr Kamal Theater was timed to coincide with the 90th anniversary of the birth of the classic of Kyrgyz prose Chingiz Aitmatov and took place on November 4, 2018. The performance was performed in Tatar with simultaneous translation into Russian.

On December 9, 2018, the play was presented at the X All-Russian Festival of Young Directors "Hönӓr" (Craft). The performance was among seven that are nominated for the "Performance of the Year" (2019) award as a result of an open online vote by the magazine "Inde".

Last performed May 30, 2021.

== Plot ==
The director and author of the play's staging, Ilgiz Zainiev, shortens some storylines in order to highlight one, according to his idea, the most important: “the history of human destinies in difficult times". The action takes place in the 60–80s of the 20th century in the village of Sary-Ozek, but the plot covers the entire century and even fragments from the history of the peoples who lived in these lands in ancient times. The simultaneous development of action in the present and past - in two time layers - determines the play of some characters by two actors. The action, taking place in the present, is based on the funeral of Kazangap, a friend of the main character of the play, Edigei.

Kazangap's death prompted his relatives and friends to gather. After discussing and resolving some differences, they decide to bury Kazangap in the old cemetery of their ancestors, which is located at a distant distance. On this long journey, everyone is immersed in their own thoughts, including the main character. The chain of memories of Edigei, allusions to the past, are strung together on the main dramatic line: the emergence of friendship between young Kazangap and Edigei, the arrival of teacher Abutalib and his wife Zaripa in the village, a happy and cheerful New Year's Eve, and then the arrest of the teacher on a false denunciation, grief, unrequited love, the end era of repressions and executions. Often the viewer is introduced to legends and parables, which with renewed vigor reveal the theme of the trampled memory of the people. This is the merit of ruthless politics, eternal progress and people's blind pursuit of an easy life. Thus, many memories from centuries ago are experienced by the main character within one day.

== Actors ==
Participated in the play:

- Alsou Gainullina
- Ildar Khairullin
- Aidar Khafizov
- Ruzia Motyygullina
- Askhat Khismatov
- Minvali Gabdullin
- Almaz Sabirzyanov
- Milyausha Shaikhetdinova
- Fanis Safin
- Gulchachak Gaifetdinova
- Airat Arslanov
- Fanis Zihansha
- Ramil Vaziev
- Iltuzar Makhammetgaliev
- Almaz Burkhanov
- Aigul Shakurova
- Ilnur Zakirov
- Emil Talipov
- Laysan Fayzullina
- Almaz Garayev
- Fannur Mukhametzyanova
- Elvir Salimov
- Guzel Gyulverdieva
- Irek Kashapov

== Music ==
The music for the play was written by a modern Tatar composer, member of the Union of Composers of the Russian Federation and the Republic of Tatarstan Elmir Nizamov. The composer uses a chamber composition: national instruments quray (woodwind), qubız and dumbıra (plucked strings); violin, trumpet and piano. The main place in the performance is occupied by stylizations of folk melodies. At times, melodies are given by E. Nizamov without any changes and can be similar to their originals. In other cases, these stylizations are given in the processing of the style of light music or the minimalist style of our time.

== See also ==
- The Day Lasts More Than a Hundred Years (novel)
