= Mankurt =

Term for an unthinking slave

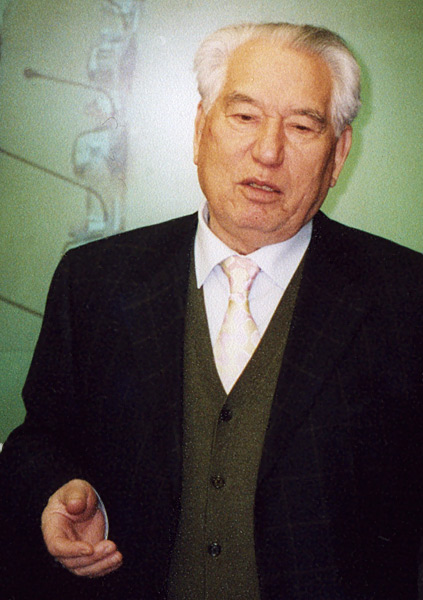
Chinghiz Aitmatov in 2007

Mankurts are unthinking slaves in Chinghiz Aitmatov's novel The Day Lasts More Than a Hundred Years (1980). After the novel was released in the Soviet Union, the word came to refer to people who have lost touch with their ethnic homeland, who have forgotten their kinship. This meaning was retained in Russia and many other post-Soviet states.

== Origin ==
According to Aitmatov's fictional legend, mankurts were prisoners of war who were turned into non-autonomous docile servants by exposing camel skin wrapped around their heads to the heat of the sun. These skins dried tight, causing brain damage and figurative zombification. Mankurts did not recognise their name, family, or tribe—"a mankurt did not recognise himself as a human being".

Aitmatov stated that he did not take the idea from tradition but invented it himself.

== Usage ==
In the later years of the Soviet Union the word mankurt (Russian: манкурт) entered common parlance as a metaphor for a Soviet citizen affected by the historical distortions and omissions propagated by official teachings.

In the figurative sense, the word mankurt refers to people who have lost touch with their ethnic homeland or who have forgotten their kinship ties. The term is now used in journalism across the former Soviet Union, and related neologisms such as mankurtizm ("mankurtism"), mankurtizatsiya ("mankurtization"), and demankurtizatsiya ("de-mankurtization") were later coined in Russian. In some former Soviet republics, the term has come to refer to those non-Russians who have lost their ethnic heritage due to the Soviet political system.

In 1990, the film Mankurt was released in the Soviet Union, based on the legend of the mankurt from Aitmatov's novel.

== See also ==
- Brainwashing – systematic coercive persuasion
- Cultural assimilation – adoption of features of another culture
- Ghilman – slave-soldiers in the Islamic world
- Homo Sovieticus – pejorative Soviet epithet for a conformist
- Malinchism – in Mexico, excessive admiration for the US, Europe and other foreign countries
- Macaulayism – the introduction of English education to British colonies
- Pinkerton syndrome – tendency of some Asians to regard white people as superior or more desirable
- Pitchcapping – form of torture involving injury to the head
- Rootless cosmopolitan – pejorative Soviet epithet, often applied to Jews
- Zombie – undead being from Haitian folklore and horror fiction
