= Jamila (novel) =

Novel by Chingiz Aitmatov

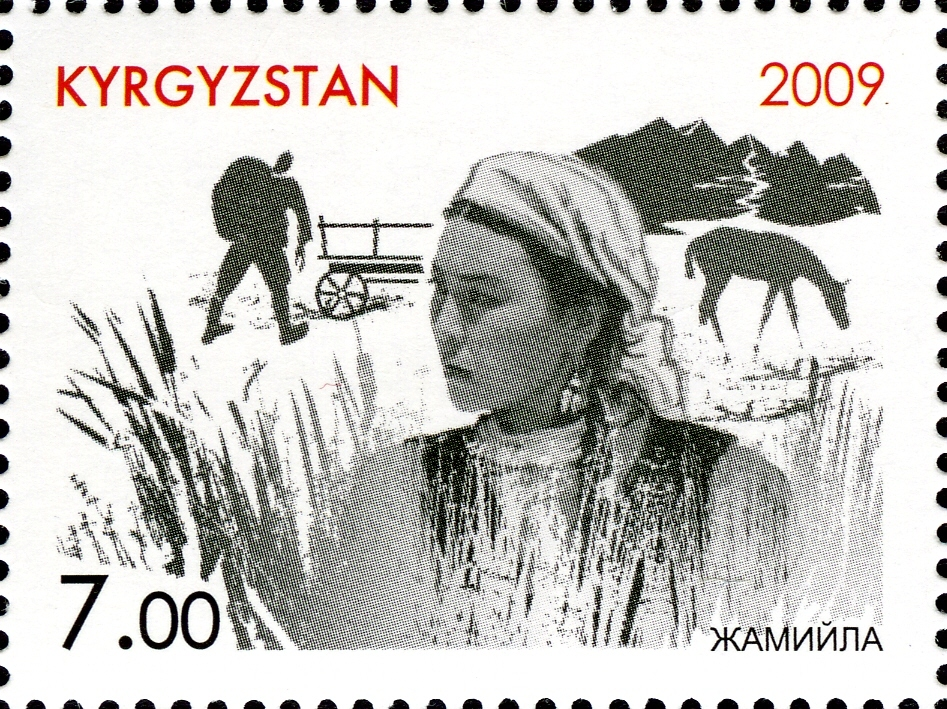
Stamp of Kyrgyzstan depicting Jamila, 2009

Jamila (Note: Russian: Джамиля [dʐəmʲɪˈlʲa]; Kyrgyz: Жамийля [t͡ɕamʲi(ː)lʲá] and sometimes anglicized as Dzhamilia) is the first major novel by Chinghiz Aitmatov, published originally in Russian in 1958. The novelette brought international fame to Aitmatov, when it came to the attention of Louis Aragon, who translated it into French and in a preface lauded it as the "world's most beautiful love story".

== Plot ==
The novel is told from the point of view of a fictional Kyrgyz artist, Seit, who tells the story by looking back on his childhood. The story recounts the love between his new sister-in-law Jamilya and a local crippled young man, Daniyar, while Jamilya's husband, Sadyk, is "away at the front" (as a Soviet soldier during World War II). As a fifteen-year-old male of the family, in a patriarchal setting, it is Seit's duty to monitor his sister-in-law's behaviour in the absence of her husband.

== Analysis ==
Based on clues in the story, it takes place in northwestern Kyrgyzstan, presumably Talas Province. The story is backdropped against the collective farming culture which was early in its peak in that period.

Although Aitmatov presents life in the story's setting as patriarchal, it is not presented as outright oppressive. Seit keeps Jamilia and Daniyar's love secret, viewing it as freedom, a freedom that he as the older first person narrator explains prompted him to choose a career as an artist.

Equally as not repeating the stereotypical patriarchal depiction of pre-Revolutionary Kyrgyzstan, the story similarly does not adopt the Soviet stereotype of women unflinchingly loyal in their husbands's absences, something that was provocative for Soviet literature at the time.

== Publications ==
The story was collected into Aitmatov's Tales of the Mountains and Steppes, alongside others such as The First Teacher and The Camel's Eye, in April 1963, for which Aitmatov was awarded the Lenin Prize.

Russian translations include:

- Айтматов, Чингиз (1982). "Джамиля" [Dzhamilia]. In Shevelev, S. (ed.). Собрание сочинений в трех томах [Collected works in 3 volumes] (in Russian). Vol. 1. Translated by Дмитриевой, А. Moscow: Молодая гвардия. pp. 79–124. OL 13788357M.

English translations in print include:

- Aitmatov, Chingiz (1973). "Dzhamilia". Tales of the Mountains and Steppes. Translated by Glagoleva, Fainna; Shartse, Olga. Moscow: Progress Publishers.
- Jamilia, translated James Riordan, Telegram Books, London, 2007

Versions of the story available online include:

- Jamila — A translation of Jamilia into English by Fainna Glagoleva
- Джамиля — Download of the 1968 movie production of the story
