= Tree Dzhamal =

1981 film

- Film poster
- Directed by: Khodzhakuli Narliyev
- Written by: Maya-Gozel Aimedova; Khodzha Kuli Narliyev
- Starring: Maya-Gozel Aimedova
- Cinematography: Khristofor Trandafilov
- Release date: July 1981
- Running time: 88 minutes
- Country: Soviet Union
- Language: Russian

Tree Dzhamal (Russian: Дерево Джамал, translit. Derevo Dzhamal) is a 1981 Soviet drama film directed by Khodzhakuli Narliyev. It was entered into the 12th Moscow International Film Festival where Maya-Gozel Aimedova won the award for Best Actress.

== Cast ==
- Maya-Gozel Aimedova
- Baba Annanov
- Nikolay Smorchkov
- Khommat Mullyk
- Mukhamed Cherkezov
- Mered Atakhanov
- Khudaiberdy Niyazov
- Khodzha Kuli Narliyev
- Samira Redzhepova
- Gulshat Durdyyeva
- Yelena Zabrovskaya
