= Nurmyrat Saryhanow =

- Born: 1906; Geok-Tepe, Transcaspian Oblast, Russian Empire (now Gökdepe, Ahal Region, Turkmenistan)
- Died: May 4, 1944 (aged 37–38); Delacău, Novoanensky District, Moldavian Soviet Socialist Republic, Soviet Union (now Anenii Noi, Republic of Moldova)
- Occupations: Writer and novelist

Nurmyrat Saryhanow (also transliterated as Sarykhanov: Russian: Нурмура́т Сарыха́нов, Nurmurat Sarykhanov; 1906 – 4 May 1944) was a Soviet Turkmen short story writer and novelist.

== Biography ==
Saryhanow was born to a poor Turkmen family in the village of Geok-Tepe in the Russian Empire's Transcaspian Region (now in Turkmenistan) in 1906.

Educated at Soviet schools after the Russian Revolution, he graduated from the Tashkent branch of the Communist University of the Toilers of the East. He served in the Red Army as a military journalist from 1929 to 1937 and became known his short stories, devoted to life in Soviet Turkmenistan. His well-received novel Şükür bagşy appeared in 1941.

Saryhanow returned to the Red Army to serve in World War II after the German invasion of the Soviet Union, serving in the 958th Order of Bogdan Khmelnitsky Rifle Regiment of the 299th Kharkov Rifle Division. He died in the war in 1944 in Moldova.

His works were translated into the Russian language and were anthologized in both languages during the post-war period. In April 2017 in the Moldavian village of Delacău where he died, his memorial was restored. A month later, it was visited by a Turkmen delegation led by foreign minister Raşit Meredow.
