= Khodzhakuli Narliev =

Turkmen film director, actor, screenwriter, and producer

Hojaguly Narliyev (Turkmen: Hojaguly Narliýew; born 21 January 1937 in Ashkhabad, Turkmen SSR, USSR), also known as Khodzhakuli Narliev, is a Turkmen film director, actor, screenwriter, and producer, and the first secretary of the Film Union of Turkmenistan.

Narliev graduated from Moscow's Gerasimov Institute of Cinematography (VGIK) in 1960. His first film of note was working with director Bulat Mansurov on The Competition in 1963, a notable film in the development of Turkmen national cinema. He garnered critical acclaim for his 1972 film Nevestka (Daughter-in-Law) which is considered to be "the film that put Turkmen film on the map" and the most important film in Turkmen cinema. Narliyev's movies typically deal with issues surrounding women in Soviet society and Sovietization.

As an actor, Narliyev appeared in Kto byl nichem... (1974), Kogda zhenshchina osedlaet konya (1974), Derevo Dzhamal (1981) (also directed and wrote) and Nichevo ne sluchilos' (1989). Derevo Dzhamal was entered into the 12th Moscow International Film Festival. Actress Maya-Gozel Aimedova won the award for Best Actress, and he received a Golden Prize nomination.

== Filmography ==
As director

- The Contest (1963)
- Daughter-in-Law (1972)
- Jamal's tree (1981)
- Karakumy, 45 v teni (1982)
- Fragi - parted with happiness (1984)
- Mankurt (1990)
