= Maya-Gozel Aimedova =

Turkmen actress (born 1941)

- Maýa-Gözel Aýmedowa
- Born: May 28, 1941 (age 85); Ashkhabad, Turkmen SSR, Soviet Union
- Occupation: Actress

Maya-Gozel Aymedova (Note: Turkmen: Maýa-Gözel Aýmedowa, sometimes given as Maya-Gozel Aimedova) (born 28 May 1941) is a Turkmen actress. Her most famous role is in the 1972 film Nevestka (Daughter-in-Law).

== Film career ==
Aimedova was born in Ashkhabad, Turkmen SSR, USSR and graduated from the Lunacharsky State Institute for Theatre Arts in 1964, and joined the Turkmenistan Young Spectator's Theatre in Ashgabat. Her onscreen debut was in Sluchai v Dash-Kale (Incident in Dash-Kala, 1961), in which she played a teacher who fights against outdated marriage practices. In 1972, she starred in Nevestka, for which she was awarded a USSR State Prize.

Nevestka was directed by Khodjakuli Narliev, with whom she worked on a number of films, including Kogda zhenshchina osedlaet konia (When a Woman Saddles a Horse, 1975) and Derevo Dzhamal (Djamal's Tree, 1980). For both of these films, she also co-wrote the screenplay.

Her last film role was in the 1990 film Mankurt. After Turkmenistan gained independence in 1991, the country's film industry was suppressed.

== Personal life ==
Aimedova is married to Khodjakuli Narliev. She joined the Communist Party in 1971.

== Awards and honours ==
- 1972 — USSR State Prize
- 1982 — People's Artist of Turkmen SSR
- 1987 — People's Artist of the USSR

== Filmography ==
- Sluchai v Dash-Kale (Incident in Dash-Kala, 1961)
- Nevestka (Daughter-in-Law, 1972)
- Kogda zhenshchina osedlaet konia (When a Woman Saddles a Horse, 1975)
- Umei skazat' net (You Must Be Able to Say No, 1976)
- Adventures of Ali-Baba and the Forty Thieves (1979)
- Derevo Dzhamal (Djamal's Tree, 1980)
- Karakumy, 45 gradusov v teni (Karakumy, 45 Degrees in the Shade, 1982)
- Fragi — razluchennyi so schast'em (Fragi — Separated from Happiness, 1984)
- Do svidaniia, moi parfinianin (Goodbye, My Parthian, 1987)
- Beshenaia (The Mad Woman, 1988)
- Mankurt (1990)
