= Karakum (film) =

- Directed by: Arend Agthe; Uzmaan Saparov
- Written by: Arend Agthe; Uzmaan Saparov
- Produced by: Ottokar Runze
- Cinematography: Michael Wiesweg
- Edited by: Ursula Höf
- Music by: Martin Cyrus; Matthias Raue
- Release date: 1994 (Turkmenistan)
- Countries: Turkmenistan; Germany
- Language: German

Karakum (1994) is a Turkmen and German adventure film directed by Arend Agthe and Uzmaan Saparov and produced by Ottokar Runze. The story of the film was written by Arend Agthe and Uzmaan Saparov.

== Plot ==
13-year old Robert plans to visit his father, an engineer in the Karakum Desert. After arriving at the airport, he is driven there by truck driver Pjotr, joined by Pjotr's nephew, Murad. During the trip through the desert, Pjotr's truck gets stuck; Pjotr sets off to find water and doesn't return. Robert then gets the idea to build a sand sailing rig from parts on the truck; which he and Murad use to sail through the desert in an attempt to find help.

== Cast ==
- Max Kullmann as Robert
- Murad Orazov as Murad
- Pjotr Olev as Pjotr
- Neithardt Riedel as Jansen
- Aleksandr Potapov as Boris
- Martin Semmelrogge as Brink
- Victor Marosov as Gregor
- Murat Annageldyyev as Narbiger
- Khodzha Durdy Narliyev as Anführer der Banditen
- Mulkoman Orazov as Bandit
- Anabirdijev Birdinasar as Major der Miliz
- Kurban Dshumajev as Milizsoldat
- Altyn Khodzhayeva as Schwägerin
- Dshenet Orasova as Kleine Schwester
- Ata Dovletov as Alter Mann
- Dshenet Allakulijeva as Enkelin
- Berdy Ashirov as Tankwart

== Production ==
Arend Agthe conceived the film's plot. He also developed the storyline of the film along with Uzmaan Saparov. The film was produced by Ottokar Runze. Fred Steinbach and Dietrich Voigtlaender serving as the executive producers. The film's score was composed by Martin Cyrus and Matthias Raue. Michael Wiesweg and Ursula Höf served as the film's cinematographer and editor, respectively.

== Release and reception ==
The film was released in 1994 in Turkmenistan and on 10 April 1997 in Germany and received generally positive reviews from critics. Variety described the film as "an engaging, sometimes exciting juvenile adventure saga set in the vast deserts of former Soviet republic Turkmenistan, German co-production "Karakum" is solid, non-pandering fare for kids (over 8 or so) and adults alike. Theatrical prospects are good in select countries, along with broader tube play".
