= Sary-Ozek, Jambyl Region =

Sary-Ozek Сарыөзек
- Coordinates: 44.59°N 72.16°E

Sary-Ozek (Kazakh: Сары-Озек) is a village in the Moiynkum District of the Jambyl Region of Kazakhstan.

According to the 2021 Kazakh census, the village has a population of 346.
