= Pitchcapping =

Form of torture

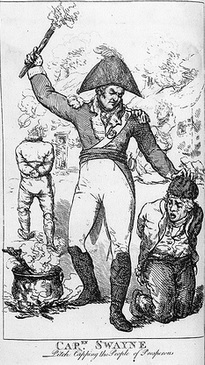
"Captain Swayne pitchcapping the people of Prosperous"

Pitchcapping was a form of torture involving the application of hot pitch or tar to the head, most commonly by forcing a pitch-soaked cloth or cap onto the scalp and allowing it to cool before removal, often causing severe burns and loss of skin. The practice is most strongly associated with the suppression of the Irish Rebellion of 1798, during which it was used by British government forces against suspected rebels.

== Irish Rebellion of 1798 ==
During the Irish Rebellion of 1798 against British rule in Ireland, government forces, in particular the militia and yeomanry, frequently used pitchcapping against suspected Irish rebels.

United Irishman Myles Byrne described pitchcapping as follows:

Flogging, half hanging, picketing, were mild tortures in comparison of the pitch caps that were applied to the heads of those who happened to wear their hair short, called croppies; the head being completely singed, a cap made of strong linen well imbued with boiling pitch was so closely put on that it could not be taken off without bringing off a part of the skin and flesh from the head: in many instances the tortured victim had one of his ears cut off to satisfy the executioner that if he escaped he could readily be discovered, being so well marked.

Another description of the torture involves pitch being "rubbed on the victim’s head, gunpowder added and the mixture set fire to." A prominent victim of pitchcapping as a form of interrogational torture was Anthony Perry, a leader of the Wexford Rebellion.

There are also accounts of the rebels themselves carrying out the torture method. The Protestant Irishwoman Jane Adams describes finding her brother with "his beard an inch long; his hair cut close to his head, one side of which was bleeding, where the rebels had put a pitch plaster, which he had torn off."

== Comparable punishments ==
In classical antiquity hot liquids – including molten metals – were occasionally used as punishment. Mithridates VI of Pontus executed Roman consul Manius Aqullius in 88 BC by pouring molten gold down his throat. A similar act was reportedly performed on Marcus Licinius Crassus following his defeat at Carrhae in 53 BC, though this was done after his death.

== See also ==
- Irish Rebellion of 1798

== Bibliography ==
- Barry, J. M. (1998). Pitchcap and Triangle: The Cork Militia in the Wexford Rising. ISBN 0-9533151-0-X
- Furlong, Nicholas (1991). Fr. John Murphy of Boolavogue. ISBN 0-906602-18-1
- Gahan, Daniel (1995). The People’s Rising: Wexford in 1798. ISBN 0-7171-2323-5
