= Daughter-In-Law =

Nevestka
- Directed by: Khodzha Kuli Narliyev
- Written by: Khodzha Durdy Narliyev; Khodzha Kuli Narliyev
- Starring: Maya-Gozel Aimedova
- Cinematography: Anatoliy Ivanov
- Music by: Redzhep Redzhepov
- Release date: 1972
- Running time: 81 minutes
- Country: Turkmen SSR

Nevestka (English: Daughter-In-Law, Turkmen: Gelin) is a 1972 Soviet-era Turkmenistani film directed by Khodzha Kuli Narliyev, starring Maya-Gozel Aimedova, Aynabat Amanliyeva, and Baba Annanov. The film is about a young woman who loses her husband during the World War II. Despite her family's advice to re-marry, she stays with her lonely father-in-law in the desert, going about the daily work, cherishing her memories and hopes that one day her husband might come home.

The film was shown at the Moscow International Film Festival in 2011 in the "Socialist Avant-garde" film program.

== Cast ==
- Maya-Gozel Aimedova
- Aynabat Amanliyeva
- Baba Annanov
- Ogulkurban Durdyyeva
- Khommat Mullyk
- Arslan Muradov
- Khodzha Durdy Narliyev
- Mergen Niyazov
- Khodzhan Ovezgelenov

== Reception ==
Nevestka has been called "the film that put Turkmen film on the map". Mira Liehm and Antonín J. Liehm note its "strong cinematic feeling for local settings". Michael Rouland calls it a "representation of Turkmen life at the edge of the desert during World War Two", writing that it "engages a rich genre in Soviet film: the tragedy of lives left on the home front while loved ones sacrificed their lives on the battlefront. Bridging the vast territorial and cultural spaces of the Soviet Union, the sacrifice of war and its suffering was a common theme of Soviet film".

Narliyev and Aimedova were both awarded a USSR State Prize for their roles as director and lead actress in the film.
