= Chinghiz Aitmatov =

Soviet and Kyrgyz author (1928-2008)

- Чыңгыз Айтматов
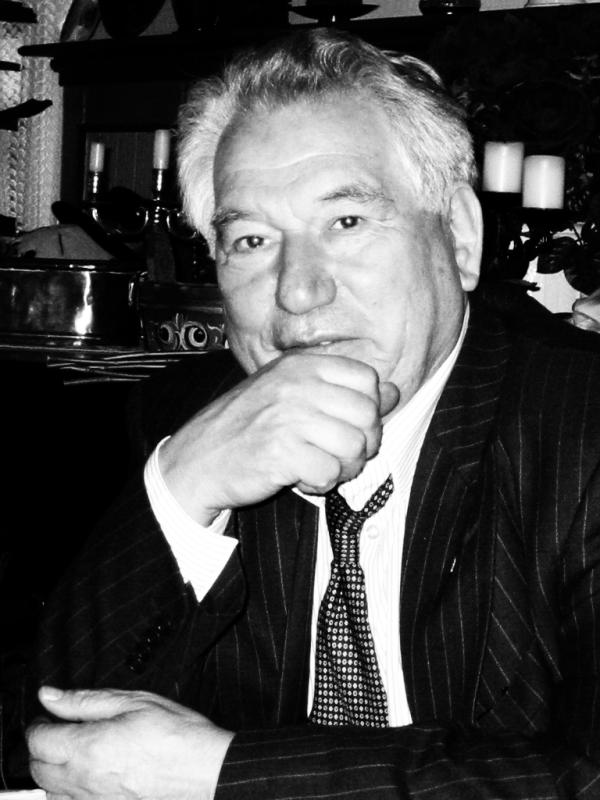
- Aitmatov in 2003
- Born: 12 December 1928; Sheker, Kirghiz ASSR, Soviet Union
- Died: 10 June 2008 (aged 79); Nuremberg, Germany
- Writing career
- Genres: Novels; short stories
- Notable works: Jamila, The Day Lasts More Than a Hundred Years

Ambassador of Kyrgyzstan to the European Union, NATO, UNESCO and the Benelux countries
- In office 1994–2006
- President: Askar Akayev

Ambassador of the Soviet Union and Russia to Luxembourg
- In office 5 October 1990 – 6 January 1994
- President: Mikhail Gorbachev; Boris Yeltsin
- Preceded by: Aleksandr Avdeyev
- Succeeded by: Aleksei Glukhov

People's Deputy of the Soviet Union
- In office 1989–1991

Chinghiz Torekulovich Aitmatov (Note: Russian: Чингиз Торекулович Айтматов; Kyrgyz: Чыңгыз Төрөкул уулу Айтматов, romanized: Chynggyz Törökul uulu Aitmatov, IPA: [t͡ɕʰɯɴʁɯ́s tʰɵɾɵkʰʊ́ɫ‿uːɫʊ́ aɪtmɑ́tʰəɸ]) (12 December 1928 – 10 June 2008) was a Kyrgyz author who wrote mainly in Russian, but also in Kyrgyz. He is one of the best-known figures in Kyrgyz literature.

== Life ==
He was born to a Kyrgyz father and Tatar mother. Aitmatov's parents were civil servants in Sheker. In 1937, his father was charged with "bourgeois nationalism" in Moscow, arrested, and executed in 1938.

Aitmatov lived at a time when Kyrgyzstan was being transformed from one of the most remote lands of the Russian Empire to a republic of the USSR. The future author studied at a Soviet school in Sheker. He also worked from an early age. At fourteen, he was an assistant to the Secretary at the Village Soviet. He later held jobs as a tax collector, a loader, and an engineer's assistant and continued with many other types of work.

In 1946, he began studying at the Animal Husbandry Division of the Kirghiz Agricultural Institute in Frunze, but later switched to literary studies at the Maxim Gorky Literature Institute in Moscow, where he lived from 1956 to 1958. For the next eight years he worked for Pravda. He joined the Soviet Communist Party in 1959, at the time of de-Stalinization, and later was a member of the Supreme Soviet. He endorsed the glasnost policies of Mikhail Gorbachev.

By 1990 he fulfilled a number of board and administrative positions including on the Supreme Soviet's Committee for Culture and National Languages and the Union of Soviet Writers.

He was a member of the jury at the 2nd Moscow International Film Festival, in 1961; at the 7th Moscow International Film Festival, in 1971; and in 2002 was president of the jury at the 24th Moscow International Film Festival. In 1994, he was a member of the jury at the 44th Berlin International Film Festival.

On 16 May 2008, Aitmatov was admitted with kidney failure to a hospital in Nuremberg, Germany, where he died of pneumonia on 10 June 2008 at the age of 79. Aitmatov's remains were flown to Kyrgyzstan, where there were numerous ceremonies before he was buried in the village Koy-Tash, Alamüdün District, Chüy Region, Kyrgyzstan, on the Ata-Beyit cemetery, which he had helped to found and where his father most likely is buried.

His obituary in The New York Times characterized him as "a Communist writer whose novels and plays before the collapse of the Soviet Union gave a voice to the people of the remote Soviet republic of Kyrgyz" and adds that he "later became a diplomat and a friend and adviser to the Soviet leader Mikhail Gorbachev."

== Literary career ==
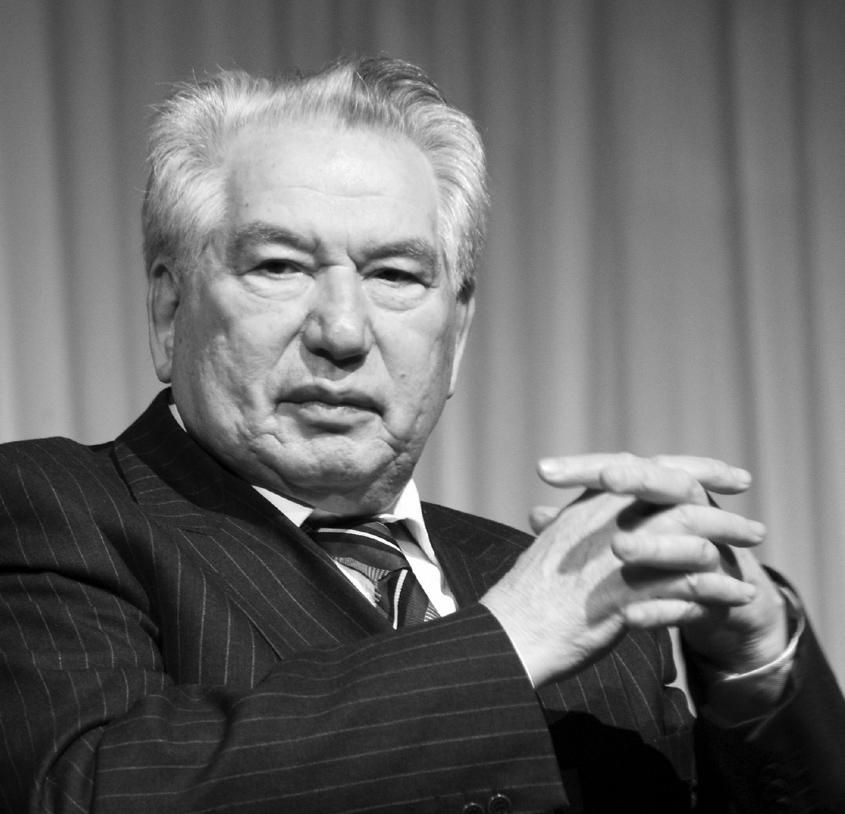
Aitmatov in 2007

Chinghiz Aitmatov belonged to the post-war generation of writers. His output before his well-known work Jamila in 1958 was not significant. Aitmatov's first two publications appeared in 1952 in Russian: "Газетчик Дзюйо" ("The Newspaper Boy Dziuio") and "Ашым" ("Ashim"). His first work published in Kyrgyz was "Ак Жаан" ("White Rain", 1954). Two other short novels from that period are "Трудная переправа" ("A Difficult Passage", 1956) and "Лицом к лицу" ("Face to Face", 1957). But it was Jamila that came to prove the author's work. Seen through the eyes of an adolescent boy, it tells of how Jamila, a village girl, separated from her soldier husband by the war, falls in love with a disabled former soldier staying in their village as they all work to bring in and transport the grain crop.

1980 saw his novel The Day Lasts More Than a Hundred Years; his next significant novel, The Place of the Skull, was published in 1987. The Day Lasts More than a Hundred Years and other writings were translated into several languages.

Aitmatov's art was glorified by admirers. But even critics of Aitmatov mentioned the high quality of his work. Aitmatov's writing has some elements that are unique specifically to his creative process. His work drew on folklore, not in the ancient sense of it; rather, he tried to recreate and synthesize oral tales in the context of contemporary life. This is prevalent in his work; in nearly every story he refers to a myth, a legend, or a folktale. In The Day Lasts More Than a Hundred Years, a poetic legend about a young captive turned into a "mankurt" serves as a tragic allegory and becomes a significant symbolic expression of the philosophy of the novel.

His work also touches on Kyrgyzstan’s transformation from the Russian empire to a republic of the USSR and the lives of its people during the transformation. This is prevalent in Farewell, Gyulsary! Although the short story touches on the idea of friendship and loyalty between a man and his stallion, it also serves a tragic allegory of the political and USSR government. It explores the loss and grief that many Kyrgyz faced through the protagonist character in the short story.

A second aspect of Aitmatov's writing is his ultimate closeness to our "little brothers" the animals, for their and our lives are intimately and inseparably connected. The two central characters of Farewell, Gyulsary! are a man and his stallion. A camel plays a prominent role in The Day Lasts More Than a Hundred Years; one of the key turns of the novel which decides the fate of the main character is narrated through the story of the camel's rut and riot. The Place of the Skull starts off and finishes with the story of a wolf pack and the great wolf-mother Akbara and her cub; human lives enter the narrative but interweave with the lives of the wolves.

In 1963, Aitmatov was honored with the Lenin Prize for the compilation "Повести гор и степей" (the title translates into English "Tales of the Mountains and Steppes") which had been published earlier that same year containing the four novels "Джамиля" (Jamila), "Тополек мой в красной косынке" (To Have and to Lose), "Верблюжий глаз" (Camel's Eye) and "Первый учитель" (Duishen / The First Teacher). This collection in Russian should not be confused with the 1969 collection in English titled as well "Tales of the Mountains and Steppes" which is a different compilation containing the three novels Jamila, Duishen and Farewell, Gyulsary! (besides an introduction by A. Turkov Speak out in Golden Words of Truth). He was later awarded a State prize for Farewell, Gyulsary!.

Some of his stories were filmed, like The First Teacher in 1965, Jamila in 1969, and several times To Have and to Lose.

As with many educated Kyrgyz, Aitmatov was fluent in both Kyrgyz and Russian. As he explained in one of his interviews, Russian was as much of a native language for him as Kyrgyz. Most of his early works he wrote in Kyrgyz; some of these he later translated into Russian himself, while others were translated into Russian by other translators. From 1966, he was writing in Russian. By the mid-1990s, as his reputation in Kyrgyzstan was well established, Russian critics attacked him and his 1995 novel Tavro Kassandry ("The Mark of Cassandra")--unfairly, according to literary critic Keneshbek Asanaliev, who commented that Aitmatov's Kyrgyz detractors simply reprinted an attack piece by Russian critic V. Bondarenko. The latter also claimed that Aitmatov was anti-Russian, a claim that Asanaliev ridicules.

== Diplomatic career ==
In addition to his literary work, Chinghiz Aitmatov was a diplomat who was accredited by 3 countries.

From 1990 to 1993, he was ambassador for the Soviet Union to Luxembourg, but at the collapse of the Union, he was re-accredited by Russia to Luxembourg. Then from 2000 to 2008, he was accredited by Kyrgyzstan to be its ambassador to the European Union, NATO, UNESCO and the Benelux countries, then France.

== Awards ==
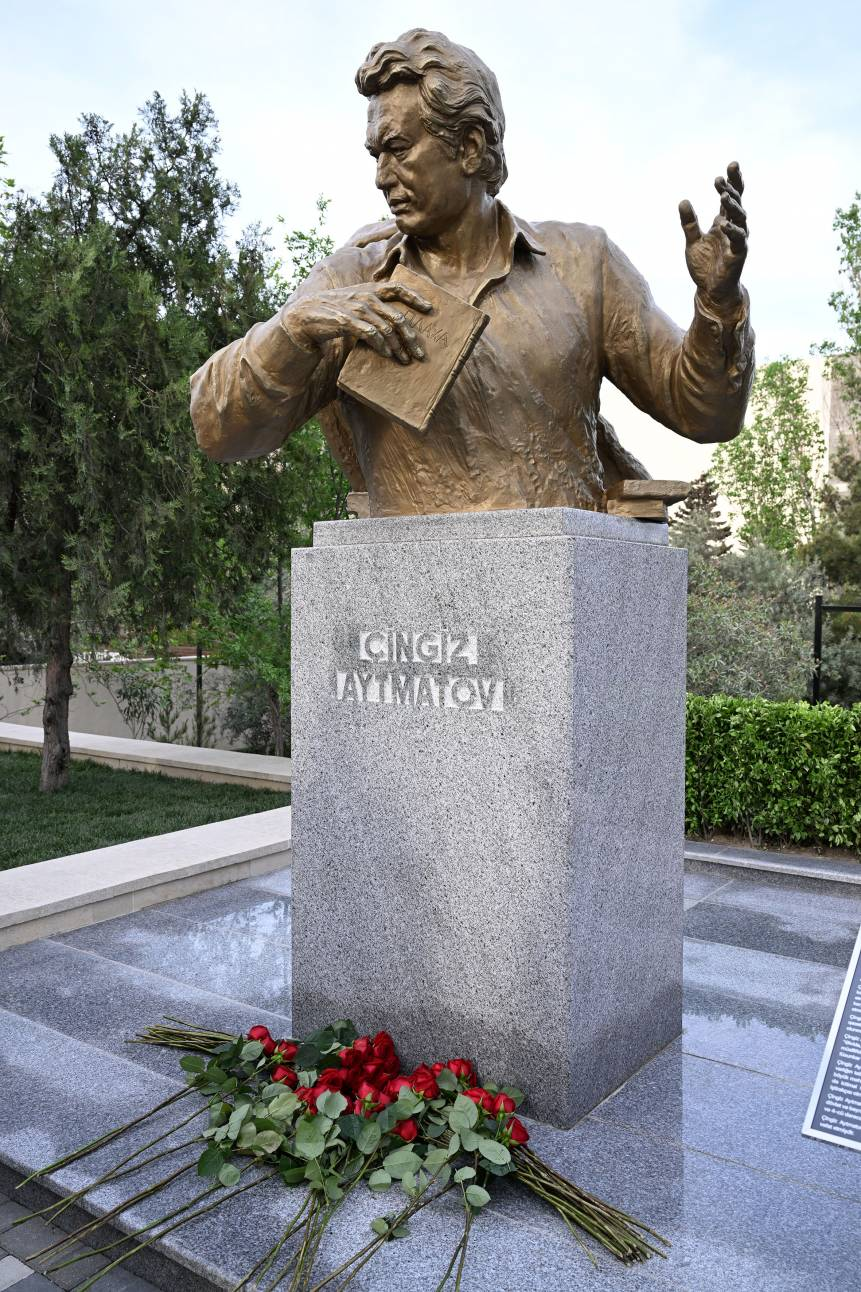
Monument dedicated to Aitmatov in Baku, Azerbaijan

=== Soviet Union ===
- Hero of Socialist Labor (31 July 1978)
- State Prize of the Kyrgyz SSR (1976)
- Lenin Prize (1963)
- USSR State Prize (1968, 1977, 1983)
- Two Order of Lenin (2 July 1971, 31 July 1978)
- Order of the October Revolution (12 December 1988)
- Two Order of the Red Banner of Labor (4 May 1962 and 28 October 1967)
- Medal "For Distinguished Labour" (1 November 1958)

=== Kyrgyzstan ===
- Hero of the Kyrgyz Republic (4 February 1997)
- Commemorative gold order "Manas-1000" and commemorative gold medal (15 August 1995)
- Order of Manas (24 May 1999)

=== Other countries ===
- Russia – Order of Friendship (8 December 1998)
- Uzbekistan – Order of Friendship (30 August 1995)
- Uzbekistan – Order of Outstanding Merit (11 December 1998)
- Kazakhstan – Order of Fatherland (23 January 1999)
- Azerbaijan – Order of Friendship (25 February 2008)
- Poland – Order of the Smile

== Major works in English translation ==
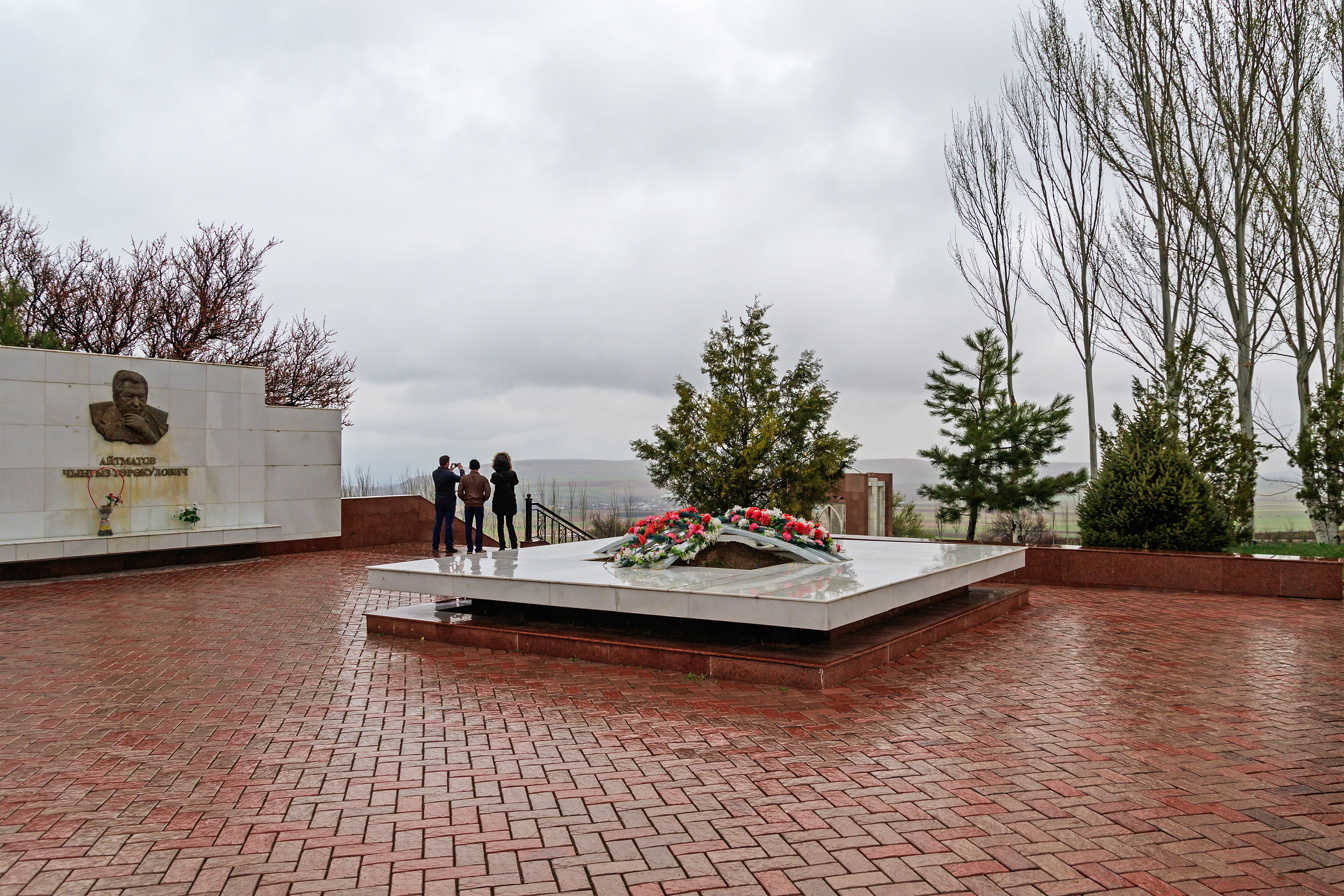
Grave of Aitmatov near Bishkek

- Jamila / Jamilia («Джамиля», 1958)
  - in compilation Tales of the Mountains and Steppes, Progress Publishers (1969). ("Jamila", translated by Fainna Glagoleva)
  - Telegram Books (2007). ISBN 978-1-846-59032-0 ("Jamilia", translated by James Riordan)
- To Have and to Lose («Тополек мой в красной косынке», 1961). in compilation Short Novels, Progress Publishers (1965). (translated by Olga Shartse)
- Camel's Eye / Camel Eye («Верблюжий глаз», 1961)
  - in compilation Anthology of Soviet Short Stories, two volumes, compiled by Nikolai Atarov, Volume 2, pp. 54–86, Progress Publishers (1976). ("Camel's Eye", translated by Olga Shartse)
  - in compilation Mother Earth and Other Stories, Faber (1989). ISBN 978-0-571-15237-7 ("Camel Eye", translated by James Riordan)
- Duishen / The First Teacher («Первый учитель», 1962)
  - in compilation Short Novels, Progress Publishers (1965). ("Duishen", translated by Olga Shartse)
  - in compilation Mother Earth and Other Stories, Faber (1989). ISBN 978-0-571-15237-7 ("The First Teacher", translated by James Riordan)
- Mother Earth («Саманчынын жолу» / «Материнское поле», 1963)
  - in compilation Short Novels, Progress Publishers (1965). (translated by Fainna Solasko)
  - in compilation Mother Earth and Other Stories, Faber (1989). ISBN 978-0-571-15237-7 (translated by James Riordan)
- Farewell, Gyulsary! / Farewell, Gulsary! («Прощай, Гульсары», 1966)
  - in compilation Tales of the Mountains and Steppes, Progress Publishers (1969). ("Farewell, Gyulsary!", translated by Fainna Glagoleva)
  - Hodder & Stoughton Ltd (1970). ISBN 978-0-340-12864-0 ("Farewell, Gulsary!", translated by John French)
- The White Steamship / The White Ship («Белый пароход», 1970)
  - Hodder & Stoughton (1972). ISBN 978-0-340-15996-5 ("The White Steamship", translated by Tatyana & George Feifer)
  - Crown Publishing Group (1972). ISBN 978-0-517-50074-3 ("The White Ship", translated by Mirra Ginsburg)
- The Lament of a Migrating Bird («Плач перелётной птицы», 1972). Felixstowe Premier Press (1973) (translated by John French)
- The Ascent of Mt. Fuji («Восхождение на Фудзияму», written together with Kaltai Mukjamedzhanov, 1973). Farrar, Straus and Giroux (1975). ISBN 978-0-374-10629-4 (translated by Nicholas Bethell)
- Cranes Fly Early («Ранние журавли», 1975). Raduga Publishers (1983). ISBN 978-7080321133 (translated by Eve Manning)
- Piebald Dog Running Along the Shore / Spotted Dog Running Along the Seashore («Деңиз Бойлой Жорткон Ала Дөбөт» / «Пегий пес, бегущий краем моря», 1977)
  - in compilation Piebald Dog Running Along the Shore and Other Stories, Raduga Publishers (1989). ISBN 978-5050024336 ("Piebald Dog Running Along the Shore", translated by Alex Miller)
  - in compilation Mother Earth and Other Stories, Faber (1989). ISBN 978-0-571-15237-7 ("Spotted Dog Running Along the Seashore", translated by James Riordan)
- The Day Lasts More Than a Hundred Years («И дольше века длится день», 1980). Indiana University Press (1983). ISBN 978-0-253-11595-9 (translated by John French)
- The Place of the Skull («Плаха», 1987). Grove Press (1989). ISBN 978-0-8021-1000-8 (translated by Natasha Ward)
- The Time to Speak Out («Час слова», 1988). Library of Russian and Soviet Literary Journalism, Progress Publishers (1988). ISBN 978-5-01-000495-8 (translated by Paula Garb)
- The White Cloud of Genghis Khan («Белое облако Чингисхана», 1990). Independently Published (2023). ISBN 979-8863496108 (translated by Dan Szetela)
- The Plaint Of The Hunter Above The Abyss («Плач охотника над пропастью», written together with Mukhtar Shakhanov, 1993). Atamura Corporation, Almaty, Kazakhstan (1998). ISBN 978-5766747444 (translated by Walter May)

== See also ==
The day lasts for more than a century (2019 play)
